= Havering London Borough Council elections =

Local government elections in London, England

A map showing the wards of Havering from 2002 to 2022

Havering London Borough Council in London, England is elected every four years. Since the last boundary changes in 2022, 55 councillors have been elected from 20 wards.

== Political control ==
The first election to the council was held in 1964, initially operating as a shadow authority ahead of the new system coming into full effect the following year. Political control of the council since 1964 has been held by the following parties:

| Election | Overall Control | Labour | Conservative | Ind./Res. | Lib Dems | BNP | UKIP | Reform |
|---|---|---|---|---|---|---|---|---|
| 1964 | No overall control | 27 | 16 | 12 | - | - | - | - |
| 1968 | Conservative | 7 | 35 | 13 | - | - | - | - |
| 1971 | Labour | 30 | 13 | 12 | - | - | - | - |
| 1974 | No overall control | 26 | 20 | 9 | - | - | - | - |
| 1978 | Conservative | 12 | 38 | 13 | - | - | - | |
| 1982 | Conservative | 12 | 37 | 9 | 5 | - | - | - |
| 1986 | No overall control | 20 | 28 | 10 | 5 | - | - | - |
| 1990 | No overall control | 25 | 19 | 13 | 6 | - | - | - |
| 1994 | No overall control | 31 | 11 | 17 | 4 | - | - | - |
| 1998 | No overall control | 29 | 14 | 17 | 3 | - | - | - |
| 2002 | No overall control | 9 | 26 | 18 | 1 | - | - | - |
| 2006 | Conservative | 2 | 34 | 16 | 1 | 1 | - | - |
| 2010 | Conservative | 5 | 33 | 16 | - | - | - | - |
| 2014 | No overall control | 1 | 22 | 24 | - | - | 7 | - |
| 2018 | No overall control | 5 | 25 | 24 | - | - | - | - |
| 2022 | No overall control | 9 | 23 | 23 | - | - | - | - |
| 2026 | Reform | 2 | - | 14 | - | - | - | 39 |

== General borough elections ==
- 1964 Havering London Borough Council election
- 1968 Havering London Borough Council election (originally scheduled for 1967)
- 1971 Havering London Borough Council election
- 1974 Havering London Borough Council election
- 1978 Havering London Borough Council election (originally scheduled for 1977, boundary changes increased the number of seats by eight)
- 1982 Havering London Borough Council election
- 1986 Havering London Borough Council election
- 1990 Havering London Borough Council election
- 1994 Havering London Borough Council election (boundary changes took place but the number of seats remained the same)
- 1998 Havering London Borough Council election
- 2002 Havering London Borough Council election (boundary changes reduced the number of seats by nine)
- 2006 Havering London Borough Council election
- 2010 Havering London Borough Council election
- 2014 Havering London Borough Council election
- 2018 Havering London Borough Council election
- 2022 Havering London Borough Council election (boundary changes increased the number of seats by one)
- 2026 Havering London Borough Council election

== Borough result maps ==
2002 results map

2006 results map

2010 results map

2014 results map

2018 results map

2022 results map

2026 results map

== Wards ==
Wards were established for Havering when it came into existence on 1 April 1965. The first elections of ward councillors took place in 1964. These boundaries were also used for the 1968, 1971 and 1974 elections. For the 1978 elections the ward boundaries were revised. These boundaries were then also used at the 1982, 1986 and 1990 elections.

For the May 1994 elections there were minor adjustments to London borough boundaries, which affected the area and population of some Havering wards. These boundaries were also used at the 1998 elections. The ward boundaries were revised at the May 2002 elections. These boundaries were also used at the 2006, 2010, 2014 and 2018 elections. The current ward boundaries came into effect at the May 2022 elections.

== By-elections ==
The following by-elections took place between each general borough election (gains from one party to another shown).

=== 1964-1968 ===
There were no by-elections.

=== 1968-1971 ===
- 1968 Bedfords by-election
- 1968 Gidea Park by-election
- 1968 St Andrew's (Havering) by-election
- 1969 Collier Row by-election (Labour gain from Conservative)
- 1969 Hilldene by-election
- 1970 Heath Park by-election

=== 1971-1974 ===
- 1971 Collier Row by-election
- 1971 Gooshays by-election
- 1971 Heaton (Havering) by-election
- 1971 Hilldene by-election
- 1971 Emerson Park by-election
- 1972 Central (Havering) by-election
- 1973 Cranham by-election

=== 1974-1978 ===
- 1975 Hilldene by-election
- 1975 Emerson Park by-election

=== 1978-1982 ===
- 1978 St Andrew's (Havering) by-election
- 1980 Gooshays by-election
- 1980 Heaton (Havering) by-election
- 1980 Rise Park by-election
- 1981 Upminster by-election (Ratepayers gain from Conservative)

=== 1982-1986 ===
- 1983 Rainham by-election
- 1983 Ardleigh Green by-election
- 1983 Heath Park by-election
- 1983 Hylands by-election
- 1983 Mawney by-election
- 1985 Rainham by-election

=== 1986-1990 ===
- 1988 Chase Cross by-election
- 1988 Gidea Park by-election
- 1988 Hacton by-election
- 1989 Rainham by-election

=== 1990-1994 ===
- 1991 Gooshays by-election
- 1992 Hilldene by-election
- 1992 Gidea Park by-election
- 1992 Cranham East by-election

=== 1994-1998 ===
There were no by-elections.

=== 1998-2002 ===
- 2000 Rise Park by-election
- 2001 Heaton (Havering) by-election

=== 2002-2006 ===
- 2003 Rainham and Wennington by-election (Labour gain from Ind. Residents)
- 2004 Rainham and Wennington by-election (Labour gain from Ind. Residents)

=== 2006-2010 ===
- 2007 St Andrew's (Havering) by-election
- 2007 Squirrel's Heath by-election
- 2008 Gooshays by-election
- 2008 South Hornchurch by-election (Independent gain from Residents)
- 2009 St Andrew's (Havering) by-election

=== 2010-2014 ===
- 2013 Gooshays by-election (UKIP gain from Conservative)

=== 2014-2018 ===
- 2016 Heaton (Havering) by-election (Labour gain from UKIP)

=== 2018-2022 ===
- 2019 Cranham by-election

=== 2022-2026 ===
- 2023 Upminster by-election
