= 1964 Havering London Borough Council election =

- 7 May 1964

All 55 Havering London Borough Council seats 28 seats needed for a majority
- Turnout: 40.9%
	First party	Second party	Third party
	LAB	CON	IND
Party	Labour	Conservative	Independent
Seats won	27	16	12
Popular vote	76,616	52,858	34,865
Percentage	43.2%	29.8%	19.6%

The 1964 Havering Council election took place on 7 May 1964 to elect members of Havering London Borough Council in London, England. The whole council was up for election and the council went into no overall control.

== Background ==
These elections were the first to the newly formed borough. Previously elections had taken place in the Municipal Borough of Romford and Hornchurch Urban District. The borough and urban district was joined to form the new London Borough of Havering by the London Government Act 1963.

A total of 146 candidates stood in the election for the 55 seats being contested across 20 wards. These included a full slate from the Labour party, while the Conservative and Liberal parties stood 44 and 19 respectively. Other candidates included 24 Independents and 4 Communists. There were 15 three-seat wards and 5 two-seat wards.

The council was elected in 1964 as a "shadow authority" but did not start operations until 1 April 1965.

== Results ==
=== General election of councillors ===
The results saw no party gain overall control of the new council with Labour winning 27 and the Conservatives winning 16 of the 55 seats. Overall turnout in the election was 40.9%. This turnout included 713 postal votes.

1964 Havering London Borough Council election
Party	Seats	Gains	Losses	Net gain/loss	Seats %	Votes %	Votes	+/−
Labour	27	New	New	New	49.1	43.2	76,616	New
Conservative	16	New	New	New	29.1	29.8	52,858	New
Independent	12	New	New	New	21.8	19.6	34,865	New
Liberal	0	New	New	New	0.0	7.2	12,821	New
Communist	0	New	New	New	0.0	0.2	365	New

=== Aldermanic election ===
In addition to the 55 councillors, there were nine aldermen elected by the council. The four aldermen with the least votes were elected to serve until 1967 (subsequently extended to 1968) and the other five until 1970 (subsequently extended to 1971). (Note: Terms were amended by the London Government Act 1967.)

Aldermen elected in 1964, to retire in 1967:

Party	Alderman
Labour	Lawrence Carroll
Labour	Arthur Latham
Labour	Olive Roberts
Conservative	John Whale

Aldermen elected in 1964, to retire in 1970:

Party	Alderman
Independent	Alan Good
Independent	Kenneth Hay
Conservative	Jack Moultrie
Conservative	Bill Sibley
Labour	Arthur Twigger (Note: Replaced by William Smith in 1970.)

The aldermen divided four to Labour, three to the Conservatives and two Independents.

== Ward results ==
The results for each electoral ward were as follows:

=== Bedfords ===
Bedfords (2)
Party	Candidate	Votes	%	±%
Conservative	Evan Davies	1,600		
Conservative	Stanley Shute	1,587		
Labour	H. Sherlock	765		
Labour	F. Wood	748		
Independent	T. Hunt	299		
Independent	D. Bates	281		
Turnout		2,683	43.3	
Conservative win (new seat)				
Conservative win (new seat)				

=== Central ===
Central (3)
Party	Candidate	Votes	%	±%
Labour	Arthur Hawkesworth	1,827		
Labour	A. Thomas	1,728		
Labour	Reta Coffin	1,721		
Conservative	A. Smith	1,294		
Conservative	M. Course	1,277		
Conservative	V. Eades	1,211		
Independent	F. Daly	382		
Independent	M. Bates	322		
Turnout		3,350	41.7	
Labour win (new seat)				
Labour win (new seat)				
Labour win (new seat)				

=== Collier Row ===
Collier Row (3)
Party	Candidate	Votes	%	±%
Labour	L. Mills	1,907		
Labour	William Cole	1,883		
Labour	I. Barker	1,816		
Conservative	W. Falk	1,262		
Conservative	E. Joslin	1,159		
Conservative	D. Ratcliffe	1,129		
Independent	J. Higgs	446		
Turnout		3,355	40.8	
Labour win (new seat)				
Labour win (new seat)				
Labour win (new seat)				

=== Cranham ===
Cranham (3)
Party	Candidate	Votes	%	±%
Independent	Alan Good	2,586		
Independent	M. Ansell	2,515		
Independent	F. Powell	2,429		
Labour	W. Gillman	1,137		
Conservative	G. Panormo	1,017		
Conservative	D. Walker	1,004		
Labour	V. Walton	994		
Labour	R. Whitworth	979		
Turnout		4,591	45.3	
Independent win (new seat)				
Independent win (new seat)				
Independent win (new seat)				

=== Elm Park ===
Elm Park (3)
Party	Candidate	Votes	%	±%
Labour	Lawrence Carroll	2,355		
Labour	M. Hurley	2,349		
Labour	Stanley Heath-Coleman	2,346		
Liberal	G. Hogan	708		
Liberal	G. Horey	676		
Liberal	L. Blows	626		
Conservative	W. Harris	559		
Turnout		3,477	40.0	
Labour win (new seat)				
Labour win (new seat)				
Labour win (new seat)				

=== Emerson Park ===
Emerson Park (3)
Party	Candidate	Votes	%	±%
Conservative	Jack Moultrie	2,312		
Conservative	E. Foye	2,305		
Conservative	Bill Sibley	2,271		
Labour	S. Mugaseth	1,225		
Labour	P. Rudlin	1,222		
Labour	V. Murphy	1,207		
Liberal	W. West	828		
Liberal	O. Hill	722		
Liberal	A. Watts	712		
Turnout		4,341	46.7	
Conservative win (new seat)				
Conservative win (new seat)				
Conservative win (new seat)				

=== Gidea Park ===
Gidea Park (2)
Party	Candidate	Votes	%	±%
Conservative	G. Johnson	1,596		
Conservative	John Whale	1,582		
Independent	E. Bates	349		
Labour	A. Houghton	347		
Labour	A. Mills	316		
Turnout		2,188	39.1	
Conservative win (new seat)				
Conservative win (new seat)				

=== Gooshays ===
Gooshays (3)
Party	Candidate	Votes	%	±%
Labour	Olive Roberts	1,011		
Labour	A. Day	971		
Labour	F. Smyth	949		
Liberal	C. Brewster	397		
Liberal	E. Ashford	264		
Conservative	R. Mereweather	236		
Conservative	W. Scates	203		
Conservative	B. Tancock	173		
Communist	R. Cohen	108		
Turnout		2,751	32.1	
Labour win (new seat)				
Labour win (new seat)				
Labour win (new seat)				

=== Hacton ===
Hacton (3)
Party	Candidate	Votes	%	±%
Independent	N. Miles	1,608		
Independent	A. Davis	1,584		
Independent	N. Richards	1,563		
Labour	Frank Coffin	1,267		
Labour	H. Reid	1,252		
Labour	M. French	1,211		
Conservative	J. Collins	620		
Conservative	R. Carnaby	552		
Turnout		3,461	42.5	
Independent win (new seat)				
Independent win (new seat)				
Independent win (new seat)				

=== Harold Wood ===
Harold Wood (3)
Party	Candidate	Votes	%	±%
Conservative	E. Gallant	1,717		
Conservative	N. Kemble	1,696		
Conservative	J. Smith	1,680		
Labour	Pat Ridley	1,662		
Labour	Ken Weetch	1,650		
Labour	G. Otter	1,629		
Liberal	L. Harris	895		
Liberal	S. Gale	823		
Liberal	B. Potter	807		
Turnout		4,256	50.8	
Conservative win (new seat)				
Conservative win (new seat)				
Conservative win (new seat)				

=== Heath Park ===
Heath Park (3)
Party	Candidate	Votes	%	±%
Conservative	P. Allam	2,541		
Conservative	L. Hutton	2,516		
Conservative	William Smith	2,480		
Labour	R. Latham	757		
Labour	D. Libman	728		
Labour	M. Riordan	704		
Liberal	H. Barber	691		
Liberal	R. Smith	665		
Liberal	D. Mills	624		
Turnout		3,954	45.7	
Conservative win (new seat)				
Conservative win (new seat)				
Conservative win (new seat)				

=== Heaton ===
Heaton (2)
Party	Candidate	Votes	%	±%
Labour	W. Morley	1,642		
Labour	Michael Ward	1,615		
Conservative	P. Foulger	206		
Conservative	M. Line	176		
Communist	V. Carpenter	62		
Turnout		1,888	29.5	
Labour win (new seat)				
Labour win (new seat)				

=== Hilldene ===
Hilldene (2)
Party	Candidate	Votes	%	±%
Labour	Arthur Latham	1,720		
Labour	W. Russell	1,719		
Conservative	A. Dicks	228		
Conservative	J. Holiday	228		
Communist	W. French	59		
Turnout		1,997	30.4	
Labour win (new seat)				
Labour win (new seat)				

=== Hylands ===
Hylands (3)
Party	Candidate	Votes	%	±%
Labour	Arthur Twigger	1,918		
Labour	W. Hegarty	1,807		
Labour	A. Winch	1,732		
Independent	R. Reid	1,254		
Conservative	P. Wheatstone	879		
Liberal	L. Elliott	828		
Conservative	A. Ayer	790		
Liberal	F. May	686		
Turnout		3,718	44.0	
Labour win (new seat)				
Labour win (new seat)				
Labour win (new seat)				

=== Mawney ===
Mawney (3)
Party	Candidate	Votes	%	±%
Labour	H. Wright	1,722		
Labour	R. Kilbey	1,700		
Labour	L. Eley	1,682		
Conservative	D. Norris	767		
Conservative	B. Fogarty	765		
Conservative	P. Laycock	724		
Independent	J. Hand	328		
Independent	R. Starr	298		
Turnout		2,777	31.9	
Labour win (new seat)				
Labour win (new seat)				
Labour win (new seat)				

=== Oldchurch ===
Oldchurch (2)
Party	Candidate	Votes	%	±%
Labour	R. Baker	1,022		
Labour	H. Packham	1,004		
Conservative	S. Swift	439		
Conservative	E. McBurnie	426		
Turnout		1,494	25.5	
Labour win (new seat)				
Labour win (new seat)				

=== Rainham ===
Rainham (3)
Party	Candidate	Votes	%	±%
Independent	H. Turner	2,551		
Independent	D. Poole	2,516		
Independent	A. Livingstone	2,511		
Labour	R. Cartwright	1,892		
Labour	C. Welch	1,855		
Labour	J. Pittaway	1,765		
Communist	F. Barlow	136		
Turnout		4,551	44.7	
Independent win (new seat)				
Independent win (new seat)				
Independent win (new seat)				

=== St Andrew's ===
St Andrew's (3)
Party	Candidate	Votes	%	±%
Conservative	Sidney Legg	2,008		
Conservative	J. Macy	1,962		
Conservative	Albert James	1,933		
Labour	May Rudlin	1,453		
Labour	A. Winch	1,444		
Labour	H. Moss	1,436		
Liberal	T. Rimmer	643		
Liberal	R. Journet	633		
Liberal	G. Elliott	591		
Turnout				
Conservative win (new seat)				
Conservative win (new seat)				
Conservative win (new seat)				

=== South Hornchurch ===
South Hornchurch (3)
Party	Candidate	Votes	%	±%
Labour	C. Seager	1,959		
Labour	A. Booton	1,932		
Labour	E. Hillman	1,925		
Independent	H. Webb	1,357		
Independent	R. Manning	1,340		
Independent	F. Parr	1,334		
Turnout		3,371	39.9	
Labour win (new seat)				
Labour win (new seat)				
Labour win (new seat)				

=== Upminster ===
Upminster (3)
Party	Candidate	Votes	%	±%
Independent	T. Dix	2,403		
Independent	Kenneth Hay	2,339		
Independent	F. Morley	2,270		
Conservative	C. Ellis	1,305		
Conservative	O. Collins	1,241		
Conservative	P. Dughes	1,202		
Labour	W. Mills	347		
Labour	G. Miles	334		
Labour	S. Moore	328		
Turnout		3,965	46.2	
Independent win (new seat)				
Independent win (new seat)				
Independent win (new seat)				
