= 1971 Havering London Borough Council election =

- 13 May 1971

All 55 Havering London Borough Council seats 28 seats needed for a majority
	First party	Second party	Third party
	LAB	CON	RES
Party	Labour	Conservative	Residents
Seats won	30	13	12 (Note: Includes all candidates elected as (Independent) Residents or Ratepayers)
Seat change	▲23	▼22	▼1

The 1971 Havering Council election took place on 13 May 1971 to elect members of Havering London Borough Council in London, England. The whole council was up for election and the Labour Party gained overall control of the council.

== Electoral arrangements ==
The election used the wards from the 1964 election for a third time. Councillors were elected for a three-year term for the final time, with a four-year term from the next election in 1974 and subsequent elections.

Polling took place on 13 May 1971.

== Results ==
=== General election of councillors ===
The Labour Party regained the twenty seats that had been lost in 1968 and won the Harold Wood ward for the first time, gaining three further seats. This gave 30 seats in total with 28 needed for a majority. All transfers of power were from Conservative to Labour, except for the one seat in Hylands that went back from Independent Residents to Labour (having switched the other way in 1968).

Havering London Borough Council election result, 1971
Party	Seats	Gains	Losses	Net gain/loss	Seats %	Votes %	Votes	+/−
Labour	30	23	0	▲23	54.5	47.1		
Conservative	13	0	22	▼22	23.6	32.5		
Ind. Ratepayers	12	0	1	▼1	21.8			
Liberal	0	0	0	Steady	0	1.4	2,804	
Independent	0	0	0	Steady	0		682	
Communist	0	0	0	Steady	0		524	

=== Aldermanic election ===
In addition to the 55 elected councillors, there were nine aldermen on the council. Four aldermen elected in 1968 continued to serve until 1974 and the other five retired before the 1971 election.

Aldermen elected in 1971, to retire in 1977:

Party	Alderman
Labour	Reta Coffin
Labour	William Cole
Labour	Stanley Heath-Coleman
Labour	Arthur Latham
Labour	Michael Ward

Five aldermen were elected by the council in 1971 to serve until 1977. All five aldermen were for the Labour Party. The aldermen on the council divided five Labour and four Conservative after the 1971 election.

== Ward results ==
=== Bedfords ===
Bedfords (2)
Party	Candidate	Votes	%	±%
Conservative	C. Kemp	1,349		
Conservative	F. Orrin	1,289		
Labour	A. Mills	928		
Labour	Denis O'Flynn	908		
Independent	J. Squire	411		
Turnout				
Conservative hold		Swing		
Conservative hold		Swing		

=== Central ===
Central (3)
Party	Candidate	Votes	%	±%
Labour	F. Carrick	1,867		
Labour	H. Miller	1,863		
Labour	J. Taylor	1,782		
Conservative	N. Symonds	1,310		
Conservative	A. Smith	1,270		
Conservative	W. Whittingham	1,258		
Communist	C. Harper	193		
Turnout				
Labour gain from Conservative		Swing		
Labour gain from Conservative		Swing		
Labour gain from Conservative		Swing		

=== Collier Row ===
Collier Row (3)
Party	Candidate	Votes	%	±%
Labour	Bill Cole	2,522		
Labour	A. Capon	2,421		
Labour	R. Kilbey	2,352		
Conservative	R. Adaire	2,352		
Conservative	E. Joslin	1,247		
Conservative	R. Daniels	1,229		
Communist	H. Reeves	96		
Turnout				
Labour gain from Conservative		Swing		
Labour gain from Conservative		Swing		
Labour gain from Conservative		Swing		

=== Cranham ===
Cranham (3)
Party	Candidate	Votes	%	±%
Ind. Ratepayers	L. Sinclair	2,875		
Ind. Ratepayers	W. Topp	2,856		
Ind. Ratepayers	A. Good	2,835		
Conservative	D. Walker	1,096		
Labour	S. Jack	1,086		
Conservative	R. Baker	1,061		
Labour	I. Barber	1,053		
Conservative	J. Cooke	1,044		
Labour	P. O'Donoghue	1,037		
Turnout				
Ind. Ratepayers hold		Swing		
Ind. Ratepayers hold		Swing		
Ind. Ratepayers hold		Swing		

=== Elm Park ===
Elm Park (3)
Party	Candidate	Votes	%	±%
Labour	D. Burn	2,529		
Labour	J. Hoepelman	2,503		
Labour	G. Saunders	2,488		
Conservative	M. Noyes	926		
Conservative	D. Owen	895		
Conservative	D. Falconer	876		
Ind. Ratepayers	D. Cox	814		
Ind. Ratepayers	E. Cunnew	715		
Ind. Ratepayers	G. Ellis	707		
Turnout				
Labour gain from Conservative		Swing		
Labour gain from Conservative		Swing		
Labour gain from Conservative		Swing		

=== Emerson Park ===
Emerson Park (3)
Party	Candidate	Votes	%	±%
Conservative	Jack Moultrie	2,339		
Conservative	E. Gallant	2,317		
Conservative	William Sibley	2,303		
Labour	J. Gillman	1,135		
Labour	G. Mulhern	1,116		
Labour	D. Ramstead	1,099		
Ind. Ratepayers	J. Bates	382		
Ind. Ratepayers	I. Wilkes	346		
Ind. Ratepayers	G. Morris	340		
Liberal	J. Bastick	287		
Liberal	A. Chudley	279		
Liberal	S. Howard	266		
Turnout				
Conservative hold		Swing		
Conservative hold		Swing		
Conservative hold		Swing		

=== Gidea Park ===
Gidea Park (2)
Party	Candidate	Votes	%	±%
Conservative	J. Johnston	1,730		
Conservative	N. Kemble	1,677		
Labour	P. Ridley	458		
Labour	A. Houghton	451		
Turnout				
Conservative hold		Swing		
Conservative hold		Swing		

=== Gooshays ===
Gooshays (3)
Party	Candidate	Votes	%	±%
Labour	Reta Coffin	3,456		
Labour	Frank Coffin	3,310		
Labour	G. Dodge	3,119		
Liberal	P. Collins	529		
Conservative	C. Mawson	372		
Conservative	H. Everitt	348		
Conservative	H. Nock	347		
Liberal	T. Hurlstone	263		
Liberal	T. Keeper	222		
Turnout				
Labour hold		Swing		
Labour hold		Swing		
Labour hold		Swing		

=== Hacton ===
Hacton (3)
Party	Candidate	Votes	%	±%
Ind. Ratepayers	A. Davis	1,647		
Ind. Ratepayers	N. Miles	1,628		
Ind. Ratepayers	N. Richards	1,567		
Labour	H. Moss	1,455		
Labour	E. Jones	1,452		
Labour	E. Rawlins	1,418		
Conservative	C. Stancombe	880		
Conservative	D. Forster	875		
Conservative	D. Biddlecombe	818		
Turnout				
Ind. Ratepayers hold		Swing		
Ind. Ratepayers hold		Swing		
Ind. Ratepayers hold		Swing		

=== Harold Wood ===
Harold Wood (3)
Party	Candidate	Votes	%	±%
Labour	T. Ward	1,845		
Labour	R. Whitworth	1,815		
Labour	Geoffrey Otter	1,788		
Conservative	A. Finn	1,684		
Conservative	R. Ramsey	1,676		
Conservative	C. Devlin	1,645		
Ind. Ratepayers	V. Mari	798		
Ind. Ratepayers	D. Warren	793		
Ind. Ratepayers	P. Morgan	763		
Turnout				
Labour gain from Conservative		Swing		
Labour gain from Conservative		Swing		
Labour gain from Conservative		Swing		

=== Heath Park ===
Heath Park (3)
Party	Candidate	Votes	%	±%
Conservative	K. Brown	2,673		
Conservative	A. Gladwin	2,645		
Conservative	L. Hutton	2,641		
Labour	A. Mills	952		
Labour	H. Packham	947		
Labour	J. Smith	933		
Turnout				
Conservative hold		Swing		
Conservative hold		Swing		
Conservative hold		Swing		

=== Heaton ===
Heaton (2)
Party	Candidate	Votes	%	±%
Labour	J. Spindler	2,234		
Labour	Michael Ward	2,211		
Conservative	D. Cure	286		
Conservative	E. Souter	279		
Turnout				
Labour hold		Swing		
Labour hold		Swing		

=== Hilldene ===
Hilldene (2)
Party	Candidate	Votes	%	±%
Labour	Stanley Heath-Coleman	2,684		
Labour	R. Whiting	2,668		
Conservative	M. Heagerty	213		
Conservative	M. Orrin	199		
Communist	R. Cohen	137		
Turnout				
Labour hold		Swing		
Labour hold		Swing		

=== Hylands ===
Hylands (3)
Party	Candidate	Votes	%	±%
Labour	V. Birnie	1,992		
Labour	P. Osborne	1,971		
Labour	A. Prescott	1,970		
Conservative	Jean Frost	1,041		
Ind. Ratepayers	R. Reid	1,037		
Conservative	T. Kemp	1,023		
Conservative	G. Panormo	962		
Ind. Ratepayers	K. Roe	850		
Ind. Ratepayers	L. Long	825		
Independent	B. Percy-Davis	271		
Turnout				
Labour gain from Ind. Ratepayers		Swing		
Labour gain from Conservative		Swing		
Labour gain from Conservative		Swing		

=== Mawney ===
Mawney (3)
Party	Candidate	Votes	%	±%
Labour	Ruby Latham	2,125		
Labour	R. Groizard	2,055		
Labour	J. Selby	2,043		
Conservative	I. Harlock	1,391		
Conservative	K. Allen	1,361		
Conservative	V. Bush	1,333		
Turnout				
Labour gain from Conservative		Swing		
Labour gain from Conservative		Swing		
Labour gain from Conservative		Swing		

=== Oldchurch ===
Oldchurch (2)
Party	Candidate	Votes	%	±%
Labour	R. Baker	1,389		
Labour	J. Riley	1,366		
Conservative	S. Swift	837		
Conservative	W. Todd	817		
Turnout				
Labour gain from Conservative		Swing		
Labour gain from Conservative		Swing		

=== Rainham ===
Rainham (3)
Party	Candidate	Votes	%	±%
Ind. Ratepayers	L. Waterman	2,488		
Ind. Ratepayers	H. Turner	2,473		
Ind. Ratepayers	D. Poole	2,411		
Labour	I. Whysall	2,124		
Labour	H. Wright	2,079		
Labour	H. Hull	2,017		
Conservative	A. North	538		
Conservative	I. Lamont	531		
Conservative	V. Manning	531		
Communist	T. Stapleton	98		
Turnout				
Ind. Ratepayers hold		Swing		
Ind. Ratepayers hold		Swing		
Ind. Ratepayers hold		Swing		

=== St Andrew's ===
St Andrew's (3)
Party	Candidate	Votes	%	±%
Conservative	Albert James	1,685		
Conservative	Edward Hoad	1,653		
Conservative	D. Peters	1,622		
Labour	K. Ince	1,566		
Labour	M. Rudlin	1,516		
Labour	B. Carroll	1,501		
Ind. Ratepayers	M. Gay	575		
Ind. Ratepayers	P. Littlechild	545		
Ind. Ratepayers	A. Wright	529		
Liberal	B. Grant	174		
Liberal	T. Rimmer	170		
Liberal	W. Wallace	170		
Turnout				
Conservative hold		Swing		
Conservative hold		Swing		
Conservative hold		Swing		

=== South Hornchurch ===
South Hornchurch (3)
Party	Candidate	Votes	%	±%
Labour	H. Bygate	2,897		
Labour	H. Rivers	2,862		
Labour	J. Whysall	2,753		
Conservative	B. Boakes	931		
Conservative	J. Smith	929		
Conservative	J. Collins	922		
Ind. Ratepayers	G. Reynolds	344		
Ind. Ratepayers	A. Robertson	320		
Turnout				
Labour gain from Conservative		Swing		
Labour gain from Conservative		Swing		
Labour gain from Conservative		Swing		

=== Upminster ===
Upminster (3)
Party	Candidate	Votes	%	±%
Ind. Ratepayers	F. Everett	2,245		
Ind. Ratepayers	F. Morley	2,201		
Ind. Ratepayers	R. Manning	2,196		
Conservative	O. Collins	1,669		
Conservative	Bruce Gordon-Picking	1,635		
Conservative	L. Reilly	1,554		
Labour	S. Miller	433		
Labour	S. Gibson	412		
Labour	M. Hoepelman	394		
Liberal	P. Atkinson	164		
Liberal	A. Rabone	160		
Liberal	D. Kruger	120		
Turnout				
Ind. Ratepayers hold		Swing		
Ind. Ratepayers hold		Swing		
Ind. Ratepayers hold		Swing		

== By-elections ==
The following by-elections took place between the 1971 and 1974 elections:

- 1971 Collier Row by-election
- 1971 Gooshays by-election
- 1971 Heaton (Havering) by-election
- 1971 Hilldene by-election
- 1971 Emerson Park by-election
- 1972 Central (Havering) by-election
- 1973 Cranham by-election
