= 1968 Havering London Borough Council election =

- 9 May 1968

All 55 Havering London Borough Council seats 28 seats needed for a majority
	First party	Second party	Third party
	CON	RES	LAB
Party	Conservative	Ind. Residents	Labour
Seats won	35	13	7
Seat change	▲19	▲1	▼20
Popular vote	98,040	34,586	40,307
Percentage	53.7%	19.0%	22.1%
Swing	▲23.9%	▼0.4%	▼27.0%

The 1968 Havering Council election took place on 9 May 1968 to elect members of Havering London Borough Council in London, England. The whole council was up for election and the Conservative Party gained overall control of the council for the first time.

== Electoral arrangements ==
The election was originally scheduled for 1967, but the term of members due to go out in 1967 was extended for one year to prevent the London borough council elections taking place in the same year as the Greater London Council election. (Note: Borough councillor and alderman terms due to end in 1967 were extended by the London Government Act 1967.) The election used the twenty wards from the previous election for a second time. Councillors were elected for three years with the next election scheduled for 1971.

Polling took place on 9 May 1968.

== Results ==
=== General election of councillors ===
Gaining nineteen seats, the Conservative Party won overall control of the council for the first time. The Labour Party lost twenty seats and was only able to hold on to seven councillors in the Heaton, Hilldene and Gooshays wards covering the Harold Hill estate. Nineteen seats went from Labour to the Conservatives. One of the three seats in Hylands ward went from Labour to the Independent Residents. Holding on to a further twelve seats in Cranham, Hacton, Rainham and Upminster, the Independent Residents became the second largest group on the council.

Havering London Borough Council election result, 1968
Party	Seats	Gains	Losses	Net gain/loss	Seats %	Votes %	Votes	+/−
Conservative	35	19	0	▲19	63.6	53.7	98,040	▲23.9
Ind. Residents	13	1	0	▲1	16.9	19.0	23,586	▼0.4
Labour	7	0	20	▼20	12.7	22.1	40,307	▼27.0
Liberal	0	0	0	Steady	0%	3.7	6,800	▼3.5
Independent	0	0	0	Steady	0.0	0.9	1,594	New
Communist	0	0	0	Steady	0.0	0.6	1,172	▲0.4

=== Aldermanic election ===
In addition to the 55 elected councillors, there were nine aldermen on the council. Five aldermen elected in 1964 continued to serve until 1971 and the other four retired before the 1968 election. Four aldermen were elected by the council in 1968 to serve until 1974. All four aldermen were for the Conservative Party.

Aldermen elected in 1968, to retire in 1974:

Party	Alderman
Conservative	Evan Davies
Conservative	Sydney Legg
Conservative	Stanley Shute (Note: Replaced by Arthur Latham following the death of Stanley Shute in 1970.)
Conservative	John Whale

The aldermen divided six to the Conservatives, two Independent and one to Labour after the aldermanic election.

== Ward results ==
=== Bedfords ===
Bedfords (2)
Party	Candidate	Votes	%	±%
Conservative	Evan Davies	2,013		
Conservative	Stanley Shute	1,998		
Labour	H. Packham	333		
Labour	A. Mills	321		
Turnout				
Conservative hold		Swing		
Conservative hold		Swing		

=== Central ===
Central (3)
Party	Candidate	Votes	%	±%
Conservative	L. Ellis	1,849		
Conservative	W. Falk	1,807		
Conservative	W. Whittingham	1,754		
Labour	A. Thomas	799		
Labour	J. Stevenson	750		
Labour	K. Olsen	721		
Communist	C. Harper	214		
Turnout				
Conservative gain from Labour		Swing		
Conservative gain from Labour		Swing		
Conservative gain from Labour		Swing		

=== Collier Row ===
Collier Row (3)
Party	Candidate	Votes	%	±%
Conservative	J. Higgs	2,146		
Conservative	E. Joslin	2,083		
Conservative	D. Keery	1,977		
Labour	L. Mills	1,265		
Labour	W. Cole	1,258		
Labour	J. Selby	1,200		
Communist	H. Reeves	188		
Turnout				
Conservative gain from Labour		Swing		
Conservative gain from Labour		Swing		
Conservative gain from Labour		Swing		

=== Cranham ===
Cranham (3)
Party	Candidate	Votes	%	±%
Ind. Residents	W. Topp	2,653		
Ind. Residents	J. Squire	2,628		
Ind. Residents	Louisa Sinclair	2,606		
Conservative	R. Baker	1,781		
Conservative	L. Bonner	1,749		
Conservative	D. Cranna	1,749		
Labour	S. Jack	478		
Labour	E. Goggin	474		
Labour	N. Plant	471		
Liberal	W. Wallace	216		
Liberal	P. Atkinson	215		
Turnout				
Ind. Residents gain from Independent		Swing		
Ind. Residents gain from Independent		Swing		
Ind. Residents gain from Independent		Swing		

=== Elm Park ===
Elm Park (3)
Party	Candidate	Votes	%	±%
Conservative	G. Bunch	1,842		
Conservative	B. Casey	1,811		
Conservative	N. Noyes	1,804		
Labour	J. Hoepelman	1,244		
Labour	Stanley Heath-Coleman	1,240		
Labour	G. Rowlands	1,189		
Liberal	I. Draper	322		
Liberal	S. Golledge	300		
Liberal	R. Barwick	290		
Communist	V. Faversham	161		
Turnout				
Conservative gain from Labour		Swing		
Conservative gain from Labour		Swing		
Conservative gain from Labour		Swing		

=== Emerson Park ===
Emerson Park (3)
Party	Candidate	Votes	%	±%
Conservative	R. Carnaby	3,446		
Conservative	E. Gallant	3,392		
Conservative	N. Kemble	3,313		
Liberal	P. Ratchford	643		
Liberal	J. Bastick	614		
Labour	B. Whitworth	465		
Labour	A. Mais	439		
Labour	R. Whitworth	435		
Turnout				
Conservative hold		Swing		
Conservative hold		Swing		
Conservative hold		Swing		

=== Gidea Park ===
Gidea Park (2)
Party	Candidate	Votes	%	±%
Conservative	R. Clark	2,108		
Conservative	J. Johnston	2,069		
Independent	F. Chatfield	213		
Independent	L. Robertson	206		
Labour	A. Houghton	174		
Labour	A. Miles	164		
Turnout				
Conservative hold		Swing		
Conservative hold		Swing		

=== Gooshays ===
Gooshays (3)
Party	Candidate	Votes	%	±%
Labour	Frank Coffin	1,424		
Labour	Reta Coffin	1,367		
Labour	I. Barber	1,251		
Conservative	H. Jefferies	795		
Conservative	C. Mawson	795		
Conservative	T. Rowswell	766		
Communist	W. French	160		
Turnout				
Labour hold		Swing		
Labour hold		Swing		
Labour hold		Swing		

=== Hacton ===
Hacton (3)
Party	Candidate	Votes	%	±%
Ind. Residents	N. Miles	1,621		
Ind. Residents	A. Davis	1,591		
Ind. Residents	N. Richards	1,482		
Conservative	L. Klein	1,376		
Conservative	S. New	1,351		
Conservative	S. Johnson	1,332		
Labour	A. Connor	611		
Labour	C. Connor	608		
Labour	V. Belcher	554		
Turnout				
Ind. Residents gain from Independent		Swing		
Ind. Residents gain from Independent		Swing		
Ind. Residents gain from Independent		Swing		

=== Harold Wood ===
Harold Wood (3)
Party	Candidate	Votes	%	±%
Conservative	J. Smith	2,789		
Conservative	J. Frost	2,715		
Conservative	D. Owen	2,659		
Labour	D. Edwards	1,005		
Labour	G. Otter	939		
Labour	R. Smith	818		
Liberal	A. Stubbs	460		
Liberal	M. Chambers	416		
Turnout				
Conservative hold		Swing		
Conservative hold		Swing		
Conservative hold		Swing		

=== Heath Park ===
Heath Park (3)
Party	Candidate	Votes	%	±%
Conservative	W. Smith	3,441		
Conservative	L. Hutton	3,406		
Conservative	K. Brown	3,394		
Independent	E. Bates	557		
Labour	W. Mills	384		
Labour	J. Holt	355		
Labour	S. Horler	337		
Turnout				
Conservative hold		Swing		
Conservative hold		Swing		
Conservative hold		Swing		

=== Heaton ===
Heaton (2)
Party	Candidate	Votes	%	±%
Labour	Michael Ward	955		
Labour	D. Burn	922		
Conservative	C. Kemp	709		
Conservative	D. Cure	683		
Turnout				
Labour hold		Swing		
Labour hold		Swing		

=== Hilldene ===
Hilldene (2)
Party	Candidate	Votes	%	±%
Labour	Arthur Latham	1,088		
Labour	Reg Whiting	1,049		
Conservative	P. Marsden	572		
Conservative	J. Barrance	519		
Communist	R. Cohen	104		
Turnout				
Labour hold		Swing		
Labour hold		Swing		

=== Hylands ===
Hylands (3)
Party	Candidate	Votes	%	±%
Ind. Residents	R. Reid	1,370		
Conservative	T. Kemp	1,362		
Conservative	G. Panormo	1,335		
Ind. Residents	T. Dix	1,316		
Ind. Residents	D. Worker	1,278		
Conservative	B. Dawson	1,265		
Labour	E. Watson	884		
Labour	W. Hegarty	862		
Labour	K. Ince	818		
Turnout				
Ind. Residents gain from Labour		Swing		
Conservative gain from Labour		Swing		
Conservative gain from Labour		Swing		

=== Mawney ===
Mawney (3)
Party	Candidate	Votes	%	±%
Conservative	J. Lucas	2,199		
Conservative	I. Harlock	2,131		
Conservative	A. Sharp	2,119		
Labour	R. Latham	1,030		
Labour	F. Carrick	935		
Labour	R. Kilby	885		
Communist	C. Bacon	170		
Turnout				
Conservative gain from Labour		Swing		
Conservative gain from Labour		Swing		
Conservative gain from Labour		Swing		

=== Oldchurch ===
Oldchurch (2)
Party	Candidate	Votes	%	±%
Conservative	S. Swift	1,189		
Conservative	W. Todd	1,131		
Labour	R. Baker	558		
Labour	T. Ward	540		
Turnout				
Conservative gain from Labour		Swing		
Conservative gain from Labour		Swing		

=== Rainham ===
Rainham (3)
Party	Candidate	Votes	%	±%
Ind. Residents	H. Turner	2,683		
Ind. Residents	D. Poole	2,643		
Ind. Residents	L. Waterman	2,504		
Conservative	I. Lamont	823		
Labour	H. Bygate	591		
Labour	E. O'Donnell	578		
Labour	A. Bowers	575		
Communist	T. Stapleton	175		
Turnout				
Ind. Residents gain from Independent		Swing		
Ind. Residents gain from Independent		Swing		
Ind. Residents gain from Independent		Swing		

=== St Andrew's ===
St Andrew's (3)
Party	Candidate	Votes	%	±%
Conservative	Sydney Legg	2,716		
Conservative	Edward Hoad	2,685		
Conservative	Albert James	2,609		
Liberal	B. Grant	544		
Liberal	M. Reeve	542		
Liberal	T. Rimmer	531		
Labour	G. Dodge	481		
Labour	G. Saunders	477		
Labour	D. Ramstead	462		
Turnout				
Conservative hold		Swing		
Conservative hold		Swing		
Conservative hold		Swing		

=== South Hornchurch ===
South Hornchurch (3)
Party	Candidate	Votes	%	±%
Conservative	J. Collins	1,095		
Conservative	J. Smith	1,092		
Conservative	C. Sherman	1,090		
Labour	P. Ridley	993		
Labour	May Rudlin	964		
Ind. Residents	G. Reynolds	912		
Labour	A. Lesslie	895		
Ind. Residents	F. Banning	738		
Ind. Residents	R. Vickers	735		
Independent	L. Lowe	323		
Independent	L. Long	295		
Liberal	L. Blows	207		
Liberal	F. Tyson	182		
Liberal	J. South	175		
Turnout				
Conservative gain from Labour		Swing		
Conservative gain from Labour		Swing		
Conservative gain from Labour		Swing		

=== Upminster ===
Upminster (3)
Party	Candidate	Votes	%	±%
Ind. Residents	F. Everett	2,631		
Ind. Residents	R. Manning	2,603		
Ind. Residents	F. Morley	2,592		
Conservative	O. Collins	1,755		
Conservative	P. Ellis	1,728		
Conservative	R. Guest	1,723		
Labour	W. Mansfield	264		
Labour	H. Sparks	216		
Labour	A. Booton	212		
Liberal	A. Rabone	167		
Liberal	B. Thame	162		
Liberal	G. Burnett	153		
Turnout				
Ind. Residents gain from Independent		Swing		
Ind. Residents gain from Independent		Swing		
Ind. Residents gain from Independent		Swing		

== By-elections ==
The following by-elections took place between the 1968 and 1971 elections:

- 1968 Bedfords by-election
- 1968 Gidea Park by-election
- 1968 St Andrew's (Havering) by-election
- 1969 Collier Row by-election (Labour gain from Conservative)
- 1969 Hilldene by-election
- 1970 Heath Park by-election
