= Cranham (ward) =

Coordinates: 51.56761°N 0.26691°E

- Electoral ward for the Havering London Borough Council
- Cranham ward boundaries since 2022
- Borough: Havering
- County: Greater London
- Population: 12,987 (2021) (Note: 2021 Census data reported for 2022 ward boundaries)
- Electorate: 9,840 (2022)
- Major settlements: Cranham and Upminster
- Area: 6.557 square kilometres (2.532 sq mi)

Current electoral ward
- Created: 1965–1978 (first creation); 2002 (second creation)
- Number of members: 3
- Councillors: Gillian Ford; John Tyler; Lesley Tyler
- Created from: Cranham East, Cranham West and Emerson Park in 2002
- ONS code: 00ARGD (2002–2022)
- GSS code: E05000307 (2002–2022); E05013968 (2022–present)

Cranham is an electoral ward in the London Borough of Havering. The ward was originally created in 1965 and abolished in 1978. It was created again in 2002 and was revised in 2022. It returns councillors to Havering London Borough Council. The ward has been dominated by councillors standing as Upminster and Cranham Residents' Association candidates. (Note: Upminster and Cranham Ratepayers' Association in elections before 1978.)

== Havering council elections since 2022 ==
There was a revision of ward boundaries in Havering in 2022. The part of Cranham north of the Southend Arterial Road was transferred to Harold Wood ward.

=== 2026 election ===
The election took place on 7 May 2026.

2026 Havering London Borough Council election: Cranham (3)
Party	Candidate	Votes	%	±%
Havering Residents Association	Gillian Ford	2,844	53.0	−27.5
Havering Residents Association	John Tyler	2,407	44.9	−27.9
Havering Residents Association	Lesley Tyler	2,184	40.7	−27.6
Reform	Terry Clarke	1,914	35.7	N/A
Reform	Jeff Garnett	1,758	32.8	N/A
Reform	Jarod Tse	1,563	29.1	N/A
Conservative	Jack Hurley	476	8.9	−5.0
Green	Sarah Haider	411	7.7	+0.2
Green	Peter Caton	400	7.5	N/A
Conservative	Baishali Chowdhury	345	6.4	−6.5
Green	Ben Hollis	295	5.5	N/A
Conservative	Sujit Sen	275	5.1	−6.2
Labour	Barbara Bramley	270	5.0	−3.8
Labour	Kate Darvill	255	4.6	−7.0
Labour	Amber Tait	213	4.0	−3.9
Liberal Democrats	Catrin Warden	115	2.1	−1.0
Turnout		5,362	54.49	
Havering Residents Association hold		Swing		
Havering Residents Association hold		Swing		
Havering Residents Association hold		Swing		

=== 2022 election ===
The election took place on 5 May 2022.

2022 Havering London Borough Council election: Cranham (3)
Party	Candidate	Votes	%	±%
Residents	Gillian Ford	3,107	80.5	
Residents	John Tyler	2,807	72.8	
Residents	Philip Ruck	2,636	68.3	
Conservative	Tracey McEvoy	535	13.9	
Conservative	Danny Weedon	496	12.9	
Labour	Kate Darvill	449	11.6	
Conservative	Poh Foong	435	11.3	
Labour	David Dawson	338	8.8	
Labour	Jeffery Stafford	306	7.9	
Green	David Hughes	289	7.5	
Liberal Democrats	Susanne Brown	121	3.1	
Liberal Democrats	Philip Sait	55	1.4	
Turnout			40.83	
Majority		2,101	54.4	
Residents win (new boundaries)				
Residents win (new boundaries)				
Residents win (new boundaries)				

== 2002–2022 Havering council elections ==
Cranham ward boundaries from 2002 to 2022

There was a revision of ward boundaries in Havering in 2002. The ward of Cranham was recreated, covering parts of northern Upminster and Cranham with the Dury Falls estate area of Hornchurch.

=== 2019 by-election ===
The by-election took place on 9 May 2019, following the death of Clarence Barrett.

2019 Cranham by-election
Party	Candidate	Votes	%	±%
Residents	Linda Van den Hende	2,421		
Green	Peter Caton	312		
Conservative	Ben Sewell	257		
Labour	Adam Curtis	219		
UKIP	Ben Buckland	208		
Liberal Democrats	Thomas Clarke	120		
Turnout				
Residents hold		Swing		

=== 2018 election ===
The election took place on 3 May 2018.

2018 Havering London Borough Council election: Cranham (3)
Party	Candidate	Votes	%	±%
Residents	Gillian Ford	2,932	68.0	
Residents	Clarence Barrett	2,817	65.3	
Residents	John Tyler	2,502	58.0	
Conservative	Paul Connew	974	22.6	
Conservative	Henry Frost	769	17.8	
Conservative	Poh Foong	593	13.8	
Labour	Kate Darvill	475	11.0	
Labour	John McKernan	415	9.6	
Green	Peter Caton	325	7.5	
Labour	John Millard	287	6.7	
UKIP	Helen Johnson	274	6.4	
Turnout			43.09%	
Majority		1,528		
Residents hold		Swing		
Residents hold		Swing		
Residents hold		Swing		

=== 2014 election ===
2014 Havering London Borough Council election: Cranham (3)
Party	Candidate	Votes	%	±%
Residents	June Alexander	3,243	55.7	+3.6
Residents	Gillian Ford	3,159		
Residents	Clarence Barrett	3,090		
UKIP	Mark O'Neill	1,014	17.4	+11.4
Conservative	Pamela Freer	857	14.7	−13.2
Labour	Lisa Hitchin	1,413	6.2%	−1.8
Labour	Patrick Chalk	353		
Green	Peter Caton	343	5.9	+0.7
Labour	John Mckernan	338		
Turnout				
Residents hold		Swing		
Residents hold		Swing		
Residents hold		Swing		

=== 2010 election ===
The election on 6 May 2010 took place on the same day as the United Kingdom general election.

2010 Havering London Borough Council election: Cranham (3)
Party	Candidate	Votes	%	±%
Residents	Gillian Ford	4,160		
Residents	June Alexander	4,120		
Residents	Clarence Barrett	3,923		
Conservative	Jacqueline Long	2,202		
Conservative	Pamela Freer	2,085		
Conservative	Terence Monk	1,993		
Labour	John Mckernan	635		
Labour	Patrick Chalk	625		
UKIP	Sunita Webb	482		
Labour	Diane Diane	445		
Green	Peter Caton	412		
Independent	Maureen Doman	94		
Turnout				
Residents hold		Swing		
Residents hold		Swing		
Residents hold		Swing		

=== 2006 election ===
The election took place on 4 May 2006.

2006 Havering London Borough Council election: Cranham (3)
Party	Candidate	Votes	%	±%
Residents	June Alexander	3,109	63.9	
Residents	Gillian Ford	3,023		
Residents	Clarence Barrett	3,014		
Conservative	Catherine Bull	1,012	20.8	
Conservative	Terence Monk	913		
Conservative	Marc Hand	838		
Labour	Margaret Lindsay	378	7.8	
Labour	Patrick Chalk	375		
Labour	John McKernan	356		
Green	David Voak	269	5.5	
National Liberal	Graham Littlechild	99	2.0	
National Liberal	Joan Morrison	86		
National Liberal	Edgar Smith	75		
Turnout			48.1	
Residents hold		Swing		
Residents hold		Swing		
Residents hold		Swing		

=== 2002 election ===
The election took place on 2 May 2002. As an experiment, it was a postal voting election, with the option to hand the papers in on election day.

2002 Havering London Borough Council election: Cranham (3)
Party	Candidate	Votes	%	±%
Residents	Gillian Ford	4,060		
Residents	June Alexander	4,042		
Residents	Louisa Sinclair	4,004		
Conservative	David Charles	1,048		
Conservative	Lesley Kelly	900		
Conservative	Marjorie Ramsey	883		
Labour	Peter Campbell	616		
Labour	John McKernan	615		
Labour	Margaret Lindsay	590		
Green	John Robinson	306		
Turnout				
Residents win (new seat)				
Residents win (new seat)				
Residents win (new seat)				

== 1964–1978 Havering council elections ==
External image
- Map showing Cranham ward boundaries from 1965 to 1978

The initial version of the ward included parts of northern Upminster and Cranham with Great Warley and North Ockendon. For elections to the Greater London Council, the ward was part of the Havering electoral division from 1965 and then the Upminster division from 1973.

=== 1974 election ===
The election took place on 2 May 1974.

1974 Havering London Borough Council election: Cranham (3)
Party	Candidate	Votes	%	±%
Ind. Ratepayers	Rowland Knell	2,811		
Ind. Ratepayers	Jean Mitchell	2,723		
Ind. Ratepayers	Louisa Sinclair	2,714		
Conservative	Mary Noyes	1,494		
Conservative	Peter Gardner	1,445		
Conservative	John Smith	1,317		
Labour	Tom Horlock	824		
Labour	M. Rufus	811		
Labour	M. Ajustron	706		
Turnout				
Ind. Ratepayers hold		Swing		
Ind. Ratepayers hold		Swing		
Ind. Ratepayers hold		Swing		

=== 1973 by-election ===
The by-election took place on 24 May 1973.

1973 Cranham by-election
Party	Candidate	Votes	%	±%
Ind. Ratepayers	Rowland Knell	1,708		
Conservative	Mary Noyes	707		
Labour	S. Jack	633		
Liberal	A. Rabone	154		
Turnout			27.8%	
Ind. Ratepayers hold		Swing		

=== 1971 election ===
The election took place on 13 May 1971.

1971 Havering London Borough Council election: Cranham (3)
Party	Candidate	Votes	%	±%
Ind. Ratepayers	Louisa Sinclair	2,875		
Ind. Ratepayers	W. Topp	2,856		
Ind. Ratepayers	A. Good	2,835		
Conservative	D. Walker	1,096		
Labour	S. Jack	1,086		
Conservative	R. Baker	1,061		
Labour	I. Barber	1,053		
Conservative	J. Cooke	1,044		
Labour	P. O'Donoghue	1,037		
Turnout				
Ind. Ratepayers hold		Swing		
Ind. Ratepayers hold		Swing		
Ind. Ratepayers hold		Swing		

=== 1968 election ===
1968 Havering London Borough Council election: Cranham (3)
Party	Candidate	Votes	%	±%
Ind. Residents	W. Topp	2,653		
Ind. Residents	J. Squire	2,628		
Ind. Residents	Louisa Sinclair	2,606		
Conservative	R. Baker	1,781		
Conservative	L. Bonner	1,749		
Conservative	D. Cranna	1,749		
Labour	S. Jack	478		
Labour	E. Goggin	474		
Labour	N. Plant	471		
Liberal	W. Wallace	216		
Liberal	P. Atkinson	215		
Turnout				
Ind. Residents gain from Independent		Swing		
Ind. Residents gain from Independent		Swing		
Ind. Residents gain from Independent		Swing		

=== 1964 election ===
The election took place on 7 May 1964.

1964 Havering London Borough Council election: Cranham (3)
Party	Candidate	Votes	%	±%
Independent	Alan Good	2,586		
Independent	M. Ansell	2,515		
Independent	F. Powell	2,429		
Labour	W. Gillman	1,137		
Conservative	G. Panormo	1,017		
Conservative	D. Walker	1,004		
Labour	V. Walton	994		
Labour	R. Whitworth	979		
Turnout		4,591	45.3	
Independent win (new seat)				
Independent win (new seat)				
Independent win (new seat)				
