= 1974 Havering London Borough Council election =

1974 local election in England

- 2 May 1974

All 55 Havering London Borough Council seats 28 seats needed for a majority
| | First party | Second party | Third party |
|---|---|---|---|
| | LAB | CON | RES |
| Party | Labour | Conservative | Residents |
| Seats won | 26 | 20 | 9 (Note: Includes all candidates elected as (Independent) Residents or Ratepayers) |
| Seat change | ▼4 | ▲7 | ▼3 |

The 1974 Havering Council election took place on 2 May 1974 to elect members of Havering London Borough Council in London, England. The whole council was up for election and the council went in no overall control.

== Electoral arrangements ==
The 1974 election was the last to use the twenty wards established with the borough in 1965, with new boundaries in use for the 1978 election. Councillors were elected for a three-year term to end in 1977, but this was extended for a year to end in 1978. (Note: Terms were extended by the London Councillors Order 1976.) Subsequent elections were for a four-year term. It was the last election to be followed by an aldermanic election, with the role of alderman eliminated in 1978.

Polling took place on 2 May 1974.

== Results ==
=== General election of councillors ===
Seats changed hands in only three wards. In Mawney ward one seat went from Labour to Conservative. The three seats in Harold Wood ward, that were gained by Labour in the 1971 election, went back to the Conservatives. In Upminster ward the three seats held by Independent Ratepayers were gained by the Conservatives. Labour lost their majority on the council which was now in no overall control.

=== Aldermanic election ===
In addition to the 55 elected councillors, there were nine aldermen on the council. Five aldermen elected in 1971 continued to serve until 1977 and the other four retired before the 1974 election. Four aldermen were elected by the council in 1974 to serve until 1977.

Aldermen elected in 1974, to retire in 1977:

| Party | Alderman |
|---|---|
| Conservative | Jean Frost |
| Conservative | Norman Kemble |
| Conservative | Sydney Legg |
| Residents | Frank Morley |

This was the last election of aldermen with all nine having their term extended by one year to go out of office in 1978. The aldermen on the council divided five Labour, three Conservative and one Residents Association after the 1974 election.

== Ward results ==
=== Bedfords ===
Bedfords (2)
| Party | Candidate | Votes | % | ±% |
|---|---|---|---|---|
| Conservative | Evan Davies | 1,441 | | |
| Conservative | C. Kemp | 1,351 | | |
| Liberal | T. Hurlstone | 764 | | |
| Liberal | G. Jacobs | 585 | | |
| Labour | E. Taylor | 466 | | |
| Labour | D. Ainsworth | 449 | | |
| Turnout | | | | |
| Conservative hold | | Swing | | |
| Conservative hold | | Swing | | |

=== Central ===
Central (3)
| Party | Candidate | Votes | % | ±% |
|---|---|---|---|---|
| Labour | G. Cox | 1,255 | | |
| Labour | J. Taylor | 1,174 | | |
| Labour | S. Parish | 1,117 | | |
| Conservative | W. Whittingham | 991 | | |
| Conservative | R. Ramsey | 986 | | |
| Conservative | N. Symonds | 986 | | |
| Liberal | T. Beaver | 480 | | |
| Liberal | E. Bates | 417 | | |
| Liberal | G. Donnelly | 401 | | |
| Communist | C. Harper | 58 | | |
| Turnout | | | | |
| Labour hold | | Swing | | |
| Labour hold | | Swing | | |
| Labour hold | | Swing | | |

=== Collier Row ===
Collier Row (3)
| Party | Candidate | Votes | % | ±% |
|---|---|---|---|---|
| Labour | Robert Kilbey | 1,416 | | |
| Labour | Albert Mills | 1,405 | | |
| Labour | A. Capon | 1,402 | | |
| Conservative | F. Thompson | 1,180 | | |
| Conservative | A. Maskall | 1,171 | | |
| Conservative | G. Wright | 1,135 | | |
| Liberal | E. Freeman | 699 | | |
| Liberal | P. Smith | 618 | | |
| Liberal | D. Rogerson | 596 | | |
| Turnout | | | | |
| Labour hold | | Swing | | |
| Labour hold | | Swing | | |
| Labour hold | | Swing | | |

=== Cranham ===
Cranham (3)
| Party | Candidate | Votes | % | ±% |
|---|---|---|---|---|
| Ind. Ratepayers | Rowland Knell | 2,811 | | |
| Ind. Ratepayers | Jean Mitchell | 2,723 | | |
| Ind. Ratepayers | Louisa Sinclair | 2,714 | | |
| Conservative | Mary Noyes | 1,494 | | |
| Conservative | Peter Gardner | 1,445 | | |
| Conservative | John Smith | 1,317 | | |
| Labour | Tom Horlock | 824 | | |
| Labour | M. Rufus | 811 | | |
| Labour | M. Ajustron | 706 | | |
| Turnout | | | | |
| Ind. Ratepayers hold | | Swing | | |
| Ind. Ratepayers hold | | Swing | | |
| Ind. Ratepayers hold | | Swing | | |

=== Elm Park ===
Elm Park (3)
| Party | Candidate | Votes | % | ±% |
|---|---|---|---|---|
| Labour | G. Saunders | 1,531 | | |
| Labour | J. Hoepelman | 1,511 | | |
| Labour | D. Burn | 1,497 | | |
| Conservative | J. Arthur | 1,060 | | |
| Conservative | K. Barlow | 1,044 | | |
| Conservative | T. Robinson | 975 | | |
| Residents | C. Cox | 827 | | |
| Residents | E. Cunnew | 734 | | |
| Residents | G. Ellis | 718 | | |
| Liberal | E. Blythe | 327 | | |
| Liberal | I. Kendall | 316 | | |
| Liberal | S. Golledge | 277 | | |
| Turnout | | | | |
| Labour hold | | Swing | | |
| Labour hold | | Swing | | |
| Labour hold | | Swing | | |

=== Emerson Park ===
Emerson Park (3)
| Party | Candidate | Votes | % | ±% |
|---|---|---|---|---|
| Conservative | Jack Moultrie | 2,774 | | |
| Conservative | William Sibley | 2,728 | | |
| Conservative | Dennis Peters | 2,718 | | |
| Labour | P. Saunders | 667 | | |
| Labour | M. Hoepelman | 634 | | |
| Labour | G. Harris | 632 | | |
| Liberal | C. Hamilton | 403 | | |
| Ind. Ratepayers | J. Whitton-Williams | 370 | | |
| Liberal | D. de Sarandy | 368 | | |
| Ind. Ratepayers | P. Whitton-Williams | 363 | | |
| Ind. Ratepayers | I. Wilkes | 357 | | |
| Liberal | D. Kruger | 346 | | |
| Turnout | | | | |
| Conservative hold | | Swing | | |
| Conservative hold | | Swing | | |
| Conservative hold | | Swing | | |

=== Gidea Park ===
Gidea Park (2)
| Party | Candidate | Votes | % | ±% |
|---|---|---|---|---|
| Conservative | J. Johnston | 1,661 | | |
| Conservative | A. Smith | 1,636 | | |
| Liberal | J. Gibbons | 360 | | |
| Liberal | S. Gibbons | 330 | | |
| Labour | E. Freeman | 315 | | |
| Labour | J. Smith | 315 | | |
| Turnout | | | | |
| Conservative hold | | Swing | | |
| Conservative hold | | Swing | | |

=== Gooshays ===
Gooshays (3)
| Party | Candidate | Votes | % | ±% |
|---|---|---|---|---|
| Labour | Frank Coffin | 1,907 | | |
| Labour | G. Dodge | 1,834 | | |
| Labour | Wilf Mills | 1,722 | | |
| Conservative | P. Cutcher | 560 | | |
| Conservative | C. Mawson | 499 | | |
| Conservative | P. Marsden | 489 | | |
| Liberal | D. Ingle | 253 | | |
| Liberal | M. Ingle | 236 | | |
| Liberal | J. Wright | 222 | | |
| Turnout | | | | |
| Labour hold | | Swing | | |
| Labour hold | | Swing | | |
| Labour hold | | Swing | | |

=== Hacton ===
Hacton (3)
| Party | Candidate | Votes | % | ±% |
|---|---|---|---|---|
| Ind. Ratepayers | A. Davis | 1,724 | | |
| Ind. Ratepayers | N. Miles | 1,679 | | |
| Ind. Ratepayers | N. Richards | 1,647 | | |
| Labour | E. Rawlins | 929 | | |
| Labour | E. Jones | 928 | | |
| Labour | H. Hull | 911 | | |
| Conservative | K. Humphries | 652 | | |
| Conservative | C. Stancombe | 626 | | |
| Conservative | A. Plain | 609 | | |
| Liberal | G. Burnett | 139 | | |
| Liberal | P. Burnett | 139 | | |
| Liberal | K. Penfold | 126 | | |
| Turnout | | | | |
| Ind. Ratepayers hold | | Swing | | |
| Ind. Ratepayers hold | | Swing | | |
| Ind. Ratepayers hold | | Swing | | |

=== Harold Wood ===
Harold Wood (3)
| Party | Candidate | Votes | % | ±% |
|---|---|---|---|---|
| Turnout | | | | |
| Conservative | D. Forster | 2,147 | | |
| Conservative | R. Neill | 2,130 | | |
| Conservative | P. Marsden | 2,093 | | |
| Labour | B. Whitworth | 1,519 | | |
| Labour | Geoffrey Otter | 1,497 | | |
| Labour | S. Jack | 1,434 | | |
| Liberal | D. Hart | 574 | | |
| Liberal | J. Alton | 559 | | |
| Liberal | P. Hart | 543 | | |
| Turnout | | | | |
| Conservative gain from Labour | | Swing | | |
| Conservative gain from Labour | | Swing | | |
| Conservative gain from Labour | | Swing | | |

=== Heath Park ===
Heath Park (3)
| Party | Candidate | Votes | % | ±% |
|---|---|---|---|---|
| Conservative | A. Gladwin | 2,593 | | |
| Conservative | L. Hutton | 2,540 | | |
| Conservative | W. Smith | 2,471 | | |
| Liberal | K. Brewington | 787 | | |
| Liberal | S. Brewington | 773 | | |
| Liberal | I. Barwin | 722 | | |
| Labour | K. Dutton | 695 | | |
| Labour | J. Laws | 680 | | |
| Labour | D. Dattner | 677 | | |
| Turnout | | | | |
| Conservative hold | | Swing | | |
| Conservative hold | | Swing | | |
| Conservative hold | | Swing | | |

=== Heaton ===
Heaton (2)
| Party | Candidate | Votes | % | ±% |
|---|---|---|---|---|
| Labour | Jocelyn Spindler | 1,301 | | |
| Labour | Denis O'Flynn | 1,278 | | |
| Conservative | D. Cure | 373 | | |
| Conservative | R. Forster | 353 | | |
| Liberal | B. Maynard | 184 | | |
| Liberal | A. Rabone | 152 | | |
| Turnout | | | | |
| Labour hold | | Swing | | |
| Labour hold | | Swing | | |

=== Hilldene ===
Hilldene (2)
| Party | Candidate | Votes | % | ±% |
|---|---|---|---|---|
| Labour | Ron Whitworth | 1,558 | | |
| Labour | May Rudlin | 1,524 | | |
| Conservative | W. Thompson | 341 | | |
| Conservative | R. Brabner | 325 | | |
| Turnout | | | | |
| Labour hold | | Swing | | |
| Labour hold | | Swing | | |

=== Hylands ===
Hylands (3)
| Party | Candidate | Votes | % | ±% |
|---|---|---|---|---|
| Labour | V. Birnie | 1,421 | | |
| Labour | P. Osborne | 1,417 | | |
| Labour | A. Prescott | 1,415 | | |
| Conservative | Jimmy Greaves | 1,387 | | |
| Conservative | Jean Frost | 1,327 | | |
| Conservative | F. Roberts | 1,262 | | |
| Independent | B. Percy-Davis | 964 | | |
| Liberal | B. McCarthy | 543 | | |
| Liberal | A. Kendall | 490 | | |
| Liberal | J. Hewitt | 489 | | |
| Turnout | | | | |
| Labour hold | | Swing | | |
| Labour hold | | Swing | | |
| Labour hold | | Swing | | |

=== Mawney ===
Mawney (3)
| Party | Candidate | Votes | % | ±% |
|---|---|---|---|---|
| Labour | Ruby Latham | 1,279 | | |
| Conservative | V. Bush | 1,243 | | |
| Labour | L. Mills | 1,241 | | |
| Conservative | E. Joslin | 1,228 | | |
| Conservative | S. Brabner | 1,190 | | |
| Labour | H. Moss | 1,183 | | |
| Liberal | P. Burrell | 516 | | |
| Liberal | R. Packer | 427 | | |
| Liberal | B. Skilton | 389 | | |
| Turnout | | | | |
| Labour hold | | Swing | | |
| Conservative gain from Labour | | Swing | | |
| Labour hold | | Swing | | |

=== Oldchurch ===
Oldchurch (2)
| Party | Candidate | Votes | % | ±% |
|---|---|---|---|---|
| Labour | R. Baker | 1,389 | | |
| Labour | J. Riley | 1,366 | | |
| Conservative | S. Swift | 837 | | |
| Conservative | W. Todd | 817 | | |
| Turnout | | | | |
| Labour hold | | Swing | | |
| Labour hold | | Swing | | |

=== Rainham ===
Rainham (3)
| Party | Candidate | Votes | % | ±% |
|---|---|---|---|---|
| Ind. Ratepayers | H. Turner | 2,185 | | |
| Ind. Ratepayers | D. Poole | 2,144 | | |
| Ind. Ratepayers | B. Hammond | 2,065 | | |
| Labour | T. Mitchell | 1,362 | | |
| Labour | H. Miller | 1,343 | | |
| Labour | D. Ramstead | 1,271 | | |
| Conservative | A. North | 509 | | |
| Conservative | M. Reilly | 457 | | |
| Conservative | N. Regnier | 455 | | |
| Liberal | D. Thomson | 306 | | |
| Liberal | J. Green | 293 | | |
| Liberal | S. Garred | 290 | | |
| Turnout | | | | |
| Ind. Ratepayers hold | | Swing | | |
| Ind. Ratepayers hold | | Swing | | |
| Ind. Ratepayers hold | | Swing | | |

=== St Andrew's ===
St Andrew's (3)
| Party | Candidate | Votes | % | ±% |
|---|---|---|---|---|
| Conservative | David Biddlecombe | 1,487 | | |
| Conservative | Albert James | 1,448 | | |
| Conservative | Edward Hoad | 1,445 | | |
| Labour | B. Taylor | 1,136 | | |
| Labour | W. Russell | 1,112 | | |
| Labour | B. Baker | 1,096 | | |
| Residents | J. Woollard | 1,079 | | |
| Residents | G. Lewis | 1,068 | | |
| Residents | H. Stubbles | 1,065 | | |
| Liberal | B. Grant | 242 | | |
| Liberal | T. Rimmer | 231 | | |
| Liberal | T. Wood | 219 | | |
| Turnout | | | | |
| Conservative hold | | Swing | | |
| Conservative hold | | Swing | | |
| Conservative hold | | Swing | | |

=== South Hornchurch ===
South Hornchurch (3)
| Party | Candidate | Votes | % | ±% |
|---|---|---|---|---|
| Labour | H. Rivers | 1,769 | | |
| Labour | J. Whysall | 1,684 | | |
| Labour | S. Clarke | 1,677 | | |
| Ind. Ratepayers | L. Long | 946 | | |
| Ind. Ratepayers | L. Lowe | 929 | | |
| Ind. Ratepayers | J. Oliver | 915 | | |
| Conservative | D. Dryborough | 767 | | |
| Conservative | D. White | 767 | | |
| Conservative | B. Chamberlain | 728 | | |
| Turnout | | | | |
| Turnout | | | | |
| Labour hold | | Swing | | |
| Labour hold | | Swing | | |
| Labour hold | | Swing | | |

=== Upminster ===
Upminster (3)
| Party | Candidate | Votes | % | ±% |
|---|---|---|---|---|
| Conservative | Bruce Gordon-Picking | 2,334 | | |
| Conservative | R. Chamberlain | 2,242 | | |
| Conservative | L. Reilly | 2,080 | | |
| Ind. Ratepayers | F. Everett | 1,906 | | |
| Ind. Ratepayers | R. Manning | 1,752 | | |
| Ind. Ratepayers | Frank Morley | 1,736 | | |
| Labour | C. Murray | 399 | | |
| Labour | J. Scott | 333 | | |
| Labour | L. Thompson | 321 | | |
| Turnout | | | | |
| Conservative gain from Ind. Ratepayers | | Swing | | |
| Conservative gain from Ind. Ratepayers | | Swing | | |
| Conservative gain from Ind. Ratepayers | | Swing | | |

== By-elections ==
The following by-elections took place between the 1974 and 1978 elections:

- 1975 Hilldene by-election
- 1975 Emerson Park by-election
