= Hylands (ward) =

Former electoral ward in the London Borough of Havering, England

- Former electoral ward for the Havering London Borough Council
- Hylands ward boundaries from 2002 to 2022
- Borough: Havering
- County: Greater London
- Population: 12,952 (2011)

Former electoral ward
- Created: 1965
- Abolished: 2022
- Councillors: 3
- Replaced by: Hylands and Harrow Lodge
- ONS code: 00ARGM (2002–2022)
- GSS code: E05000315 (2002–2022)

Hylands was an electoral ward in the London Borough of Havering from 1965 to 2022. The ward was first used in the 1964 elections and last used at the 2018 elections. It returned councillors to Havering London Borough Council. The ward covered the northwest part of Hornchurch that blends into southern Romford. The name came from Hylands Park. The ward was replaced by Hylands and Harrow Lodge in 2022.

== 2002–2022 Havering council elections ==
There was a revision of ward boundaries in Havering in 2002.

=== 2018 election ===
The election took place on 3 May 2018.

2018 Havering London Borough Council election: Hylands (3)
Party	Candidate	Votes	%	±%
Conservative	Christine Smith	2,527	56.6	
Conservative	Maggie Themistocli	2,509	56.2	
Conservative	Ciaran White	2,425	54.3	
Residents	Derek Ganly	1,215	27.2	
Residents	David Malillos-Cabezas	1,138	25.5	
Residents	Jody Ganly	1,121	25.1	
Labour	Neil Brindley	667	14.9	
Labour	Robert Tomlinson	631	14.1	
Labour	Mohammed Hassan	602	13.5	
Green	Amanda Haines	203	4.5	
Liberal Democrats	Susan Brewington	91	2.0	
Turnout			42.34%	
Majority		1,210		
Conservative hold		Swing		
Conservative gain from Residents		Swing		
Conservative hold		Swing		

=== 2014 election ===
The election took place on 22 May 2014.

2014 Havering London Borough Council election: Hylands (3)
Party	Candidate	Votes	%	±%
Conservative	Garry Pain	1,596		
Residents	Jody Ganly	1,553		
Conservative	Carol Smith	1,542		
Conservative	Christine Smith	1,449		
Residents	Jeremy Wilkes	1,356		
UKIP	Neil Hall	1,346		
Residents	Lorraine Moss	1,287		
UKIP	Peter Gardner	1,263		
Labour	Amanda McInerney	440		
Labour	Penelope White	422		
Labour	William Murphy	410		
Labour	Mohammed Hassan	602		
Green	David Voak	285		
Liberal Democrats	James Snell	68		
Turnout			44	
Conservative hold		Swing		
Residents gain from Conservative		Swing		
Conservative hold		Swing		

=== 2010 election ===
The election on 6 May 2010 took place on the same day as the United Kingdom general election.

2010 Havering London Borough Council election: Hylands (3)
Party	Candidate	Votes	%	±%
Conservative	Georgina Galpin	3,102		
Conservative	Peter Gardner	2,815		
Conservative	Damian White	2,661		
Residents	Jeremy Wilkes	2,094		
Residents	Raymond Coomer	1,994		
Residents	Paul Wilson	1,879		
Labour	Sarah Alison	1,326		
Labour	Herbert White	1,141		
Labour	Michael Agunbiade	1,005		
UKIP	Terry Murray	967		
Green	David Voak	437		
Turnout				
Conservative hold		Swing		
Conservative hold		Swing		
Conservative hold		Swing		

=== 2006 election ===
The election took place on 4 May 2006.

2006 Havering London Borough Council election: Hylands (3)
Party	Candidate	Votes	%	±%
Conservative	Georgina Galpin	1,430	37.1	
Conservative	Mark Gadd	1,356		
Conservative	Malcolm Brace	1,325		
Residents	Susan Belcher	998	25.9	
Residents	Jeremy Wilkes	942		
Residents	Valerie Morris	897		
Labour	Raymond Shaw	670	17.4	
Labour	Michael Wood	637		
Labour	Patricia Wood	615		
UKIP	Kenneth Hayes	549	14.2	
UKIP	Terry Murray	538		
UKIP	Alan Scott	505		
National Liberal	Philip Davey	140	3.6	
National Liberal	Patricia Frater	111		
Independent	Paul Randell	72	1.9	
Turnout			39.3	
Conservative hold		Swing		
Conservative hold		Swing		
Conservative hold		Swing		

=== 2002 election ===
The election took place on 2 May 2002. As an experiment, it was a postal voting election, with the option to hand the papers in on election day.

2002 Havering London Borough Council election: Hylands (3)
Party	Candidate	Votes	%	±%
Conservative	Barry Oddy	1,912		
Conservative	Georgina Galpin	1,860		
Conservative	Malcolm Brace	1,765		
Labour	Raymond Shaw	1,315		
Residents	Linda Winter	1,250		
Residents	Victoria Johnston-Messore	1,213		
Labour	Barry Norwin	1,166		
Labour	Victoria Walford	1,115		
Turnout				
Conservative win (new boundaries)				
Conservative win (new boundaries)				
Conservative win (new boundaries)				

== 1978–2002 Havering council elections ==
Hylands ward boundaries from 1978 to 1994

There was a revision of ward boundaries in Havering in 1978. There was a very minor adjustment of the ward boundaries on 1 April 1994.

=== 1998 election ===
The election on 7 May 1998 took place on the same day as the 1998 Greater London Authority referendum.

1998 Havering London Borough Council election: Hylands (3)
Party	Candidate	Votes	%	±%
Labour	Raymond Shaw	1,393		
Labour	May Whitelock	1,371		
Labour	Michael Wood	1,296		
Conservative	Martin Sinclair	1,064		
Conservative	Anthony Fawcett	1,019		
Conservative	John Ross	999		
Liberal Democrats	David Bruck	298		
Liberal Democrats	Reginald Leavens	291		
Liberal Democrats	Albert Rabone	287		
Turnout				
Labour hold		Swing		
Labour hold		Swing		
Labour hold		Swing		

=== 1994 election ===
The election took place on 5 May 1994.

1994 Havering London Borough Council election: Hylands (3)
Party	Candidate	Votes	%	±%
Labour	Raymond Shaw	1,884	39.49	▼4.57
Labour	David Martin	1,878		
Labour	Michael Wood	1,795		
Conservative	Anthony Fawcett	1,056	22.28	▼16.11
Conservative	Janet Levy	1,047		
Conservative	Martin Sinclair	1,032		
Liberal Democrats	David Williams	502	9.96	New
Independent	George Cullen	463	9.87	New
Liberal Democrats	Kevan Wilding	452		
Liberal Democrats	Mark Miller	447		
Independent	Terry Murray	435	9.28	New
Independent	Steven Hudson	428	9.12	New
Registered electors		8,950		▲142
Turnout		3,945	44.08	▼3.14
Rejected ballots		2	0.05	▼0.07
Labour hold		Swing		
Labour hold		Swing		
Labour hold		Swing		

=== 1990 election ===
The election took place on 3 May 1990.

1990 Havering London Borough Council election: Hylands (3)
Party	Candidate	Votes	%	±%
Labour	Graham Carr	1,838	44.06	
Labour	Michael Flynn	1,816		
Labour	Raymond Shaw	1,776		
Conservative	Stephen Evans	1,616	38.39	
Conservative	Olive Baruch	1,588		
Conservative	William Jones	1,528		
SDP	Margery Ford	466	8.45	
SDP	Terence Matthews	466		
Ind. Conservative	Alan Cash	374	9.10	
SDP	Alan Ryan	108		
Registered electors		8,808		
Turnout		4,159	47.22	
Rejected ballots		5	0.12	
Labour gain from Conservative		Swing		
Labour hold		Swing		
Labour gain from Conservative		Swing		

=== 1986 election ===
The election took place on 8 May 1986.

1986 Havering London Borough Council election: Hylands (3)
Party	Candidate	Votes	%	±%
Conservative	Stephen Evans	1,361		
Labour	Dennis Daflon	1,309		
Conservative	Olive Baruch	1,299		
Conservative	Martin Sinclair	1,294		
Labour	Howard Moss	1,211		
Labour	May Whitelock	1,167		
Alliance	Martin Heazell	1,086		
Alliance	David Kendall	1,086		
Alliance	Elizabeth Heazell	1,079		
Green	Helen Smith	103		
Turnout				
Conservative hold		Swing		
Labour gain from Conservative		Swing		
Conservative hold		Swing		

=== 1983 by-election ===
The by-election took place on 10 November 1983, following the resignation of Irene Pearce.

1983 Hylands by-election
Party	Candidate	Votes	%	±%
Conservative	Martin Sinclair	767		
Labour	Anthony Hunt	756		
Alliance	Martin Heazell	502		
Residents	Ronald Whittaker	235		
Ecology	Andrew Moore	38		
Turnout				
Conservative hold		Swing		

=== 1982 election ===
The election took place on 6 May 1982.

1982 Havering London Borough Council election: Hylands (3)
Party	Candidate	Votes	%	±%
Conservative	Gerald Clarke	1,498		
Conservative	Olive Baruch	1,354		
Conservative	Irene Pearce	1,344		
Residents	Alan Prescott	955		
Residents	Colin Scott	927		
Residents	Brian Parker	926		
Labour	Stephen Clarke	880		
Labour	Colin Stickland	871		
Labour	Jess Taylor	871		
Alliance	Norma Kirkman	569		
Alliance	William Halliday	568		
Alliance	Brian Aldridge	560		
Turnout				
Conservative hold		Swing		
Conservative hold		Swing		
Conservative hold		Swing		

=== 1978 election ===
The election took place on 4 May 1978.

1978 Havering London Borough Council election: Hylands (3)
Party	Candidate	Votes	%	±%
Conservative	Jean Frost	1,855		
Conservative	Irene Pearce	1,803		
Conservative	Frederick Roberts	1,779		
Labour	Alan Prescott	1,563		
Labour	Peter Osborne	1,542		
Labour	Stewart Binns	1,484		
Liberal	Henry King	203		
Liberal	John Hewitt	195		
Liberal	Brian McCarthy	193		
Ind. Ratepayers	Pamela Wilkes	155		
Ind. Ratepayers	Kenneth Mainstone	127		
Ind. Ratepayers	Laurence Munroe	123		
Turnout				
Conservative win (new boundaries)				
Conservative win (new boundaries)				
Conservative win (new boundaries)				

== 1964–1978 Havering council elections ==
External image
- Map showing Hylands ward boundaries from 1965 to 1978

=== 1974 election ===
The election took place on 2 May 1974.

1974 Havering London Borough Council election: Hylands (3)
Party	Candidate	Votes	%	±%
Labour	Valentine Birnie	1,421		
Labour	Peter Osborne	1,417		
Labour	Alan Prescott	1,415		
Conservative	Jimmy Greaves	1,387		
Conservative	J. Frost	1,327		
Conservative	F. Roberts	1,262		
Independent	B. Percy-Davis	964		
Liberal	B. McCarthy	543		
Liberal	A. Kendall	490		
Liberal	J. Hewitt	489		
Turnout				
Labour hold		Swing		
Labour hold		Swing		
Labour hold		Swing		

=== 1971 election ===
The election took place on 13 May 1971.

1971 Havering London Borough Council election: Hylands (3)
Party	Candidate	Votes	%	±%
Labour	Valentine Birnie	1,992		
Labour	Peter Osborne	1,971		
Labour	Alan Prescott	1,970		
Conservative	J. Frost	1,041		
Ind. Ratepayers	R. Reid	1,037		
Conservative	T. Kemp	1,023		
Conservative	G. Panormo	962		
Ind. Ratepayers	K. Roe	850		
Ind. Ratepayers	L. Long	825		
Independent	B. Percy-Davis	271		
Turnout				
Labour gain from Ind. Ratepayers		Swing		
Labour gain from Conservative		Swing		
Labour gain from Conservative		Swing		

=== 1968 election ===
The election took place on 9 May 1968.

1968 Havering London Borough Council election: Hylands (3)
Party	Candidate	Votes	%	±%
Ind. Residents	R. Reid	1,370		
Conservative	T. Kemp	1,362		
Conservative	G. Panormo	1,335		
Ind. Residents	T. Dix	1,316		
Ind. Residents	D. Worker	1,278		
Conservative	B. Dawson	1,265		
Labour	E. Watson	884		
Labour	W. Hegarty	862		
Labour	K. Ince	818		
Turnout				
Ind. Residents gain from Labour		Swing		
Conservative gain from Labour		Swing		
Conservative gain from Labour		Swing		

=== 1964 election ===
The election took place on 7 May 1964.

1964 Havering London Borough Council election: Hylands (3)
Party	Candidate	Votes	%	±%
Labour	Arthur Twigger	1,918		
Labour	W. Hegarty	1,807		
Labour	A. Winch	1,732		
Independent	R. Reid	1,254		
Conservative	P. Wheatstone	879		
Liberal	L. Elliott	828		
Conservative	A. Ayer	790		
Liberal	F. May	686		
Turnout		3,718	44.0	
Labour win (new seat)				
Labour win (new seat)				
Labour win (new seat)				
