= Hacton (ward) =

Electoral ward in the London Borough of Havering

- Electoral ward for the Havering London Borough Council
- Hacton ward boundaries since 2022
- Borough: Havering
- County: Greater London
- Population: 8,489 (2021) (Note: 2021 Census data reported for 2022 ward boundaries)
- Electorate: 7,088 (2022)
- Major settlements: Hornchurch
- Area: 1.727 square kilometres (0.667 sq mi)

Current electoral ward
- Created: 1965
- Number of members: 1965–2022: 3; 2022–present: 2
- Councillors: Julie Wilkes; Geoff Burgess
- GSS code: E05013972 (2022–present)

Hacton is an electoral ward in the London Borough of Havering. The ward has existed since the creation of the borough on 1 April 1965 and was first used in the 1964 elections. It returns councillors to Havering London Borough Council. The ward includes the Racecourse Estate in Hornchurch which was built on the former Hacton Farm.

== Havering council elections since 2022 ==
There was a revision of ward boundaries in Havering in 2022.

=== 2026 election ===
The election took place on 7 May 2026.

2026 Havering London Borough Council election: Hacton (2)
| Party | Candidate | Votes | % | ±% |
|---|---|---|---|---|
| Havering Residents Association | Julie Wilkes | 1,574 | 41.5 | −39.0 |
| Reform | Geoff Burgess | 1,533 | 40.4 | N/A |
| Havering Residents Association | Reg Whitney | 1,447 | 38.1 | −35.7 |
| Reform | Mick Slaughter | 1,433 | 37.8 | N/A |
| Conservative | Rony Jacob | 310 | 8.2 | −6.7 |
| Conservative | Moses Andishu | 287 | 7.6 | −4.1 |
| Green | Graham Hayfield | 238 | 6.3 | N/A |
| Labour | Jonathon Bizzel | 210 | 5.5 | −4.1 |
| Green | Ajay Rayaprolu | 201 | 5.3 | N/A |
| Labour | Jeffery Stafford | 176 | 4.6 | −4.9 |
| Liberal Democrats | Colin Savidge | 60 | 1.6 | N/A |
| Turnout | | | 51.23 | |
| Havering Residents Association hold | | Swing | | |
| Reform gain from Havering Residents Association | | Swing | | |

=== 2022 election ===
The election took place on 5 May 2022.

2022 Havering London Borough Council election: Hacton (2)
| Party | Candidate | Votes | % | ±% |
|---|---|---|---|---|
| Residents | Ray Morgon | 2,315 | 80.5 | |
| Residents | Reg Whitney | 2,124 | 73.8 | |
| Conservative | Paul Connew | 430 | 14.9 | |
| Conservative | Patrick Marks | 337 | 11.7 | |
| Labour | Susan Jiggens | 275 | 9.6 | |
| Labour | Sinead Earley | 272 | 9.5 | |
| Turnout | | | 41.2 | |
| Majority | | 1,694 | 58.9 | |
| Residents win (new boundaries) | | | | |
| Residents win (new boundaries) | | | | |

== 2002–2022 Havering council elections ==
Hacton ward boundaries from 2002 to 2022

There was a revision of ward boundaries in Havering in 2002.

=== 2018 election ===
The election took place on 3 May 2018.

2018 Havering London Borough Council election: Hacton (3)
| Party | Candidate | Votes | % | ±% |
|---|---|---|---|---|
| Residents | Ray Morgon | 2,653 | 65.2 | |
| Residents | Louis Dodin | 2,483 | 61.0 | |
| Residents | Reg Whitney | 2,286 | 56.1 | |
| Conservative | Carol Perry | 807 | 19.8 | |
| Conservative | Patricia Clark | 781 | 19.2 | |
| Conservative | Mazim Nwafor | 630 | 15.5 | |
| Labour | Michael Davis | 567 | 13.9 | |
| Labour | Sinead Earley | 533 | 13.1 | |
| Labour | Susan Jiggens | 522 | 12.8 | |
| UKIP | Jeffrey Long | 289 | 7.1 | |
| Green | David Beesley | 200 | 4.9 | |
| Liberal Democrats | Andrew Willmer | 102 | 2.5 | |
| Turnout | | | 40.93% | |
| Majority | | 1,479 | | |
| Residents hold | | Swing | | |
| Residents hold | | Swing | | |
| Residents hold | | Swing | | |

=== 2014 election ===
The election took place on 22 May 2014.

2014 Havering London Borough Council election: Hacton (3)
| Party | Candidate | Votes | % | ±% |
|---|---|---|---|---|
| Residents | Ray Morgon | 2,708 | | |
| Residents | Louis Dodin | 2,590 | | |
| Residents | Barbara Matthews | 2,576 | | |
| UKIP | Jeffrey Garnett | 1,288 | | |
| Conservative | Ruth Edes | 679 | | |
| Conservative | Carol Perry | 616 | | |
| Conservative | Terence Mustoo | 535 | | |
| Labour | Natasha Moreno-Roberts | 424 | | |
| Labour | Sinead Earley | 413 | | |
| Labour | Susan Jiggens | 374 | | |
| Green | David Beesley | 271 | | |
| Liberal Democrats | Susan Brewington | 102 | | |
| Turnout | | | 47 | |
| Residents hold | | Swing | | |
| Residents hold | | Swing | | |
| Residents hold | | Swing | | |

=== 2010 election ===
The election on 6 May 2010 took place on the same day as the United Kingdom general election.

2010 Havering London Borough Council election: Hacton (3)
| Party | Candidate | Votes | % | ±% |
|---|---|---|---|---|
| Residents | Ray Morgon | 3,227 | | |
| Residents | Barbara Matthews | 3,172 | | |
| Residents | Louis Dodin | 3,080 | | |
| Conservative | Patricia Baumber | 2,165 | | |
| Conservative | Christine Mckenzie | 1,985 | | |
| Conservative | Ruth Edes | 1,857 | | |
| Labour | Edward Baglin | 887 | | |
| Labour | Allen Roach | 801 | | |
| Labour | Kathleen Vann | 768 | | |
| UKIP | Anthony Whitenstall | 750 | | |
| Green | David Beesley | 342 | | |
| Independent | Sally Logan | 161 | | |
| Independent | Joan Morrison | 109 | | |
| Independent | Jade Jackson | 98 | | |
| Turnout | | | | |
| Residents hold | | Swing | | |
| Residents hold | | Swing | | |
| Residents hold | | Swing | | |

=== 2006 election ===
The election took place on 4 May 2006.

2006 Havering London Borough Council election: Hacton (3)
| Party | Candidate | Votes | % | ±% |
|---|---|---|---|---|
| Residents | Ray Morgon | 2,341 | 52.3 | |
| Residents | Barbara Reith | 2,322 | | |
| Residents | Stephen Whittaker | 2,035 | | |
| Conservative | Ruth Edes | 1,181 | 26.4 | |
| Labour | Julia Darvill | 524 | 11.7 | |
| Labour | Susan Jiggens | 523 | | |
| Labour | Allen Roach | 500 | | |
| National Liberal | Gary Roberts | 272 | 6.1 | |
| National Liberal | Nakkeeran Arasaratnam | 190 | | |
| Independent | Pramjit Singh Sadra | 162 | 3.6 | |
| Turnout | | | 40.1 | |
| Residents hold | | Swing | | |
| Residents hold | | Swing | | |
| Residents hold | | Swing | | |

=== 2002 election ===
The election took place on 2 May 2002. As an experiment, it was a postal voting election, with the option to hand the papers in on election day.

2002 Havering London Borough Council election: Hacton (3)
| Party | Candidate | Votes | % | ±% |
|---|---|---|---|---|
| Residents | Ivor Cameron | 2,321 | | |
| Residents | Eileen Cameron | 2,285 | | |
| Residents | Barbara Reith | 2,260 | | |
| Conservative | Andrew Everett | 1,322 | | |
| Conservative | Ruth Edes | 1,238 | | |
| Conservative | Nicola Everett | 1,174 | | |
| Labour | David Burn | 1,025 | | |
| Labour | Susan Jiggens | 871 | | |
| Labour | Kathleen Vann | 832 | | |
| Third Way | David Durant | 289 | | |
| Turnout | | | | |
| Residents win (new boundaries) | | | | |
| Residents win (new boundaries) | | | | |
| Residents win (new boundaries) | | | | |

== 1978–2002 Havering council elections ==
Hacton ward boundaries from 1978 to 2002

There was a revision of ward boundaries in Havering in 1978.

=== 1998 election ===
The election on 7 May 1998 took place on the same day as the 1998 Greater London Authority referendum.

1998 Havering London Borough Council election: Hacton (3)
| Party | Candidate | Votes | % | ±% |
|---|---|---|---|---|
| Residents | Barbara Reith | 1,544 | | |
| Residents | Eileen Cameron | 1,522 | | |
| Residents | Ivor Cameron | 1,517 | | |
| Labour | Susan Jiggens | 849 | | |
| Labour | Richard Harradine | 836 | | |
| Labour | Bryan Vincent | 823 | | |
| Conservative | Sidney Ball | 537 | | |
| Conservative | Maureen Carter | 494 | | |
| Conservative | Donald Cawthorne | 490 | | |
| Turnout | | | | |
| Residents hold | | Swing | | |
| Residents hold | | Swing | | |
| Residents hold | | Swing | | |

=== 1994 election ===
The election took place on 5 May 1994.

1994 Havering London Borough Council election: Hacton (3)
| Party | Candidate | Votes | % | ±% |
|---|---|---|---|---|
| Residents | Barbara Reith | 2,080 | 48.22 | ▲6.89 |
| Residents | Ivor Cameron | 2,032 | | |
| Residents | Stephen Whittaker | 1,994 | | |
| Labour | Ken Clark | 1,545 | 35.64 | ▲1.54 |
| Labour | Joan Clark | 1.511 | | |
| Labour | William Howard | 1,457 | | |
| Conservative | Sidney Ball | 665 | 16.14 | ▼8.43 |
| Conservative | Laurence Hagger | 665 | | |
| Conservative | Maureen Carter | 653 | | |
| Registered electors | | 8,557 | | ▼1 |
| Turnout | | 4,438 | 51.86 | ▲0.77 |
| Rejected ballots | | 14 | 0.32 | ▲0.30 |
| Residents hold | | Swing | | |
| Residents hold | | Swing | | |
| Residents hold | | Swing | | |

=== 1990 election ===
The election took place on 3 May 1990.

1990 Havering London Borough Council election: Hacton 3)
| Party | Candidate | Votes | % | ±% |
|---|---|---|---|---|
| Residents | Barbara Reith | 1,755 | 41.33 | |
| Residents | Ivor Cameron | 1,713 | | |
| Residents | Kevin Walland | 1,629 | | |
| Labour | William Howard | 1,419 | 34.10 | |
| Labour | David Burn | 1,413 | | |
| Labour | Ernest Rawlins | 1,375 | | |
| Conservative | Kathleen Jewell | 1,028 | 24.57 | |
| Conservative | Eric Nicholls | 1,026 | | |
| Conservative | Edwin Singleton | 976 | | |
| Registered electors | | 8,558 | | |
| Turnout | | 4,372 | 51.09 | |
| Rejected ballots | | 1 | 0.02 | |
| Residents hold | | Swing | | |
| Residents hold | | Swing | | |
| Residents hold | | Swing | | |

=== 1988 by-election ===
The by-election took place on 14 April 1988, following the death of Norman Richards.

1988 Chase Cross by-election
| Party | Candidate | Votes | % | ±% |
|---|---|---|---|---|
| Residents | Stephen Whittaker | 1,315 | | |
| Conservative | Dennis Bull | 918 | | |
| Labour | William Howard | 665 | | |
| Green | Helen Smith | 41 | | |
| Independent | Michael Griffin | 27 | | |
| Turnout | | | | |
| Residents hold | | | | |

=== 1986 election ===
The election took place on 8 May 1986.

1986 Havering London Borough Council election: Hacton (3)
| Party | Candidate | Votes | % | ±% |
|---|---|---|---|---|
| Residents | Albert Davis | 1,381 | | |
| Residents | Norman Richards | 1,297 | | |
| Residents | Barbara Reith | 1,283 | | |
| Conservative | Dennis Bull | 1,015 | | |
| Conservative | Margaret Ashby | 994 | | |
| Conservative | Valerie Colebourn | 937 | | |
| Labour | David Burn | 897 | | |
| Labour | Christine French | 864 | | |
| Labour | Lee Sorrell | 859 | | |
| Alliance | Roma Penfold | 617 | | |
| Alliance | David Williams | 607 | | |
| Alliance | John Hewitt | 585 | | |
| Turnout | | | | |
| Residents hold | | Swing | | |
| Residents hold | | Swing | | |
| Residents hold | | Swing | | |

=== 1982 election ===
The election took place on 6 May 1982.

1982 Havering London Borough Council election: Hacton (3)
| Party | Candidate | Votes | % | ±% |
|---|---|---|---|---|
| Residents | Albert Davis | 1,593 | | |
| Residents | Norman Miles | 1,462 | | |
| Residents | Norman Richards | 1,412 | | |
| Conservative | Dennis Bull | 1,364 | | |
| Conservative | Margaret Ashby | 1,231 | | |
| Conservative | Martin Smeaton | 1,165 | | |
| Alliance | David Williams | 672 | | |
| Alliance | John Hewitt | 654 | | |
| Alliance | Mark Long | 626 | | |
| Labour | William Howard | 596 | | |
| Labour | Ernest Rawlins | 595 | | |
| Labour | Arthur Eade | 576 | | |
| Turnout | | | | |
| Residents hold | | Swing | | |
| Residents hold | | Swing | | |
| Residents hold | | Swing | | |

=== 1978 election ===
The election took place on 4 May 1978.

1978 Havering London Borough Council election: Hacton (3)
| Party | Candidate | Votes | % | ±% |
|---|---|---|---|---|
| Residents | Albert Davis | 1,515 | | |
| Residents | Norman Miles | 1,469 | | |
| Residents | Norman Richards | 1,376 | | |
| Conservative | Norman Kemble | 1,271 | | |
| Conservative | Frederick Thompson | 1,234 | | |
| Conservative | Wendy Thompson | 1,055 | | |
| Labour | Ernest Rawlins | 962 | | |
| Labour | Gordon Thompson | 921 | | |
| Labour | Cyril Whitelock | 885 | | |
| Turnout | | | | |
| Residents win (new boundaries) | | | | |
| Residents win (new boundaries) | | | | |
| Residents win (new boundaries) | | | | |

== 1964–1978 Havering council elections ==
External image
- Map showing Hacton ward boundaries from 1965 to 1978

=== 1974 election ===
The election took place on 2 May 1974.

1974 Havering London Borough Council election: Hacton (3)
| Party | Candidate | Votes | % | ±% |
|---|---|---|---|---|
| Ind. Ratepayers | Albert Davis | 1,724 | | |
| Ind. Ratepayers | Norman Miles | 1,679 | | |
| Ind. Ratepayers | Norman Richards | 1,647 | | |
| Labour | E. Rawlins | 929 | | |
| Labour | E. Jones | 928 | | |
| Labour | H. Hull | 911 | | |
| Conservative | K. Humphries | 652 | | |
| Conservative | C. Stancombe | 626 | | |
| Conservative | A. Plain | 609 | | |
| Liberal | G. Burnett | 139 | | |
| Liberal | P. Burnett | 139 | | |
| Liberal | K. Penfold | 126 | | |
| Turnout | | | | |
| Ind. Ratepayers hold | | Swing | | |
| Ind. Ratepayers hold | | Swing | | |
| Ind. Ratepayers hold | | Swing | | |

=== 1971 election ===
The election took place on 13 May 1971.

1971 Havering London Borough Council election: Hacton (3)
| Party | Candidate | Votes | % | ±% |
|---|---|---|---|---|
| Ind. Ratepayers | Albert Davis | 1,647 | | |
| Ind. Ratepayers | Norman Miles | 1,628 | | |
| Ind. Ratepayers | Norman Richards | 1,567 | | |
| Labour | H. Moss | 1,455 | | |
| Labour | E. Jones | 1,452 | | |
| Labour | E. Rawlins | 1,418 | | |
| Conservative | C. Stancombe | 880 | | |
| Conservative | D. Forster | 875 | | |
| Conservative | D. Biddlecombe | 818 | | |
| Turnout | | | | |
| Ind. Ratepayers hold | | Swing | | |
| Ind. Ratepayers hold | | Swing | | |
| Ind. Ratepayers hold | | Swing | | |

=== 1968 election ===
The election took place on 9 May 1968.

1968 Havering London Borough Council election: Hacton (3)
| Party | Candidate | Votes | % | ±% |
|---|---|---|---|---|
| Ind. Residents | Norman Miles | 1,621 | | |
| Ind. Residents | Albert Davis | 1,591 | | |
| Ind. Residents | Norman Richards | 1,482 | | |
| Conservative | L. Klein | 1,376 | | |
| Conservative | S. New | 1,351 | | |
| Conservative | S. Johnson | 1,332 | | |
| Labour | A. Connor | 611 | | |
| Labour | C. Connor | 608 | | |
| Labour | V. Belcher | 554 | | |
| Turnout | | | | |
| Ind. Residents gain from Independent | | Swing | | |
| Ind. Residents gain from Independent | | Swing | | |
| Ind. Residents gain from Independent | | Swing | | |

=== 1964 election ===
The election took place on 7 May 1964.

1964 Havering London Borough Council election: Hacton (3)
| Party | Candidate | Votes | % | ±% |
|---|---|---|---|---|
| Independent | Norman Miles | 1,608 | | |
| Independent | Albert Davis | 1,584 | | |
| Independent | Norman Richards | 1,563 | | |
| Labour | Frank Coffin | 1,267 | | |
| Labour | H. Reid | 1,252 | | |
| Labour | M. French | 1,211 | | |
| Conservative | J. Collins | 620 | | |
| Conservative | R. Carnaby | 552 | | |
| Turnout | | 3,461 | 42.5 | |
| Independent win (new seat) | | | | |
| Independent win (new seat) | | | | |
| Independent win (new seat) | | | | |
