= 2002 Havering London Borough Council election =

2002 local election in England

← 1998	2 May 2002	2006 →

All 54 Havering London Borough Council seats 27 seats needed for a majority
- Map of the results of the 2002 Havering council election. Conservatives in blue, Havering Residents Association in dark green, Labour in red, Liberal Democrats in yellow and Rainham & Wennington Independent Residents Group in grey.

The 2002 Havering Council election took place on 2 May 2002 to elect members of Havering London Borough Council in London, England. The whole council was up for election and the council stayed in no overall control. New ward boundaries were in use for the first time and the number of councillors reduced from the previous election. As an experiment, it was a postal voting election, with the option to hand the papers in on polling day.

== Electoral arrangements ==
New ward boundaries were used for the first time. Prior to the 2002 election the council had 63 councillors. From the 2002 election, 54 councillors were elected from 18 wards. Each ward returned three councillors.

Six of the wards were new, including a recreated Cranham ward which had been abolished in 1978. The remaining wards shared the names of previously used wards but with new boundaries. Councillors were elected for a four-year term with the next election scheduled for 2006.

As an experiment, it was a postal voting election, with the option to hand the papers in on the 2 May 2002 polling day.

== Results ==
Havering Council election result 2002
Party	Seats	Gains	Losses	Net gain/loss	Seats %	Votes %	Votes	+/−
Conservative	26				48.1%	37.2%	30,846	
Residents	18				33.3%	25.5%	21,059	
Labour	9				16.7%	25.1%	20,830	
Liberal Democrats	1				1.9%	6.1%	5,067	
Ind. Working Class	0					2.2%	1,841	
National Liberal	0					2.2%	1,803	
Independent	0					0.7%	608	
Green	0					0.7%	603	
UKIP	0					0.3%	232	

== Ward results ==
=== Brooklands ===
Brooklands (3)
Party	Candidate	Votes	%	±%
Liberal Democrats	Nigel Meyer	1,405		
Conservative	Henry Tebbutt	1,394		
Conservative	Jean Gower	1,377		
Conservative	Corinne Simmons	1,336		
Liberal Democrats	Patricia Rumble	1,312		
Liberal Democrats	Malcolm Zetter	1,286		
Labour	John McCole	1,122		
Labour	Sean Willis	975		
Labour	Pervez Badruddin	877		
Independent	Eamonn Mahon	608		
Turnout				
Liberal Democrats win (new boundaries)				
Conservative win (new boundaries)				
Conservative win (new boundaries)				

=== Cranham ===
Cranham (3)
Party	Candidate	Votes	%	±%
Residents	Gillian Ford	4,060		
Residents	June Alexander	4,042		
Residents	Louisa Sinclair	4,004		
Conservative	David Charles	1,048		
Conservative	Lesley Kelly	900		
Conservative	Marjorie Ramsey	883		
Labour	Peter Campbell	616		
Labour	John McKernan	615		
Labour	Margaret Lindsay	590		
Green	John Robinson	306		
Turnout				
Residents win (new seat)				
Residents win (new seat)				
Residents win (new seat)				

=== Elm Park ===
Elm Park (3)
Party	Candidate	Votes	%	±%
Labour	Janet Davis	1,861		
Labour	Graham Carr	1,851		
Labour	Ray Harris	1,824		
Conservative	Paul Hales	1,530		
Conservative	Stanley Elton	1,488		
Third Way	Graham Williamson	1,309		
Conservative	Michael Darby	1,300		
Turnout				
Labour win (new boundaries)				
Labour win (new boundaries)				
Labour win (new boundaries)				

=== Emerson Park ===
Emerson Park (3)
Party	Candidate	Votes	%	±%
Conservative	Roger Ramsey	2,853		
Conservative	Peter Gardner	2,747		
Conservative	Paul Rochford	2,727		
Labour	Pamela Reid	767		
Labour	Irene Eagling	737		
Labour	Terence Hughes	720		
Residents	Valerie Morris	646		
Residents	John Parker	607		
Residents	Ron Ower	593		
Liberal Democrats	Madge Mulliner	331		
Liberal Democrats	Helen Tegg	331		
Liberal Democrats	Albert Rabone	309		
Turnout				
Conservative win (new boundaries)				
Conservative win (new boundaries)				
Conservative win (new boundaries)				

=== Gooshays ===
Gooshays (3)
Party	Candidate	Votes	%	±%
Labour	William Harrison	1,507		
Labour	Yvonne Cornell	1,415		
Labour	Jeffery Stafford	1,377		
Conservative	Eileen Rosindell	887		
Conservative	Peter Acors	876		
Ind. Working Class	Melanie Stanton	850		
Conservative	Marc Hand	848		
Ind. Working Class	Andrew Walpole	833		
Ind. Working Class	John Clapton	786		
Residents	Debra Staggs	454		
Residents	Eric Staggs	424		
Residents	Joan Street	423		
Turnout				
Labour win (new boundaries)				
Labour win (new boundaries)				
Labour win (new boundaries)				

=== Hacton ===
Hacton (3)
Party	Candidate	Votes	%	±%
Residents	Ivor Cameron	2,321		
Residents	Eileen Cameron	2,285		
Residents	Barbara Reith	2,260		
Conservative	Andrew Everett	1,322		
Conservative	Ruth Edes	1,238		
Conservative	Nicola Everett	1,174		
Labour	David Burn	1,025		
Labour	Susan Jiggens	871		
Labour	Kathleen Vann	832		
Third Way	David Durant	289		
Turnout				
Residents win (new boundaries)				
Residents win (new boundaries)				
Residents win (new boundaries)				

=== Harold Wood ===
Harold Wood (3)
Party	Candidate	Votes	%	±%
Conservative	Steven Kelly	1,664		
Conservative	Natasha Ratty	1,652		
Conservative	Daryl Williams	1,606		
Labour	Brian Eagling	1,507		
Labour	Caroline Wood	1,466		
Liberal Democrats	Jonathan Coles	1,423		
Labour	Leonard Street	1,354		
Liberal Democrats	Geoffrey Coles	1,300		
Liberal Democrats	Ian Sanderson	1,293		
Turnout				
Conservative win (new boundaries)				
Conservative win (new boundaries)				
Conservative win (new boundaries)				

=== Havering Park ===
Havering Park (3)
Party	Candidate	Votes	%	±%
Conservative	Andrew Mann	2,776		
Conservative	Michael Armstrong	2,703		
Conservative	Geoffrey Starns	2,703		
Labour	Christopher Collard	997		
Labour	Frederick Symes	980		
Labour	Paul Stygal	959		
Turnout				
Conservative win (new seat)				
Conservative win (new seat)				
Conservative win (new seat)				

=== Heaton ===
Heaton (3)
Party	Candidate	Votes	%	±%
Labour	Keith Darvill	1,434		
Labour	Denis O`Flynn	1,402		
Labour	Wilfred Mills	1,353		
Conservative	Keith Wells	1,087		
Conservative	Mark Joy	1,069		
Conservative	Edward Bates	1,060		
Ind. Working Class	Henry Wilson	991		
Ind. Working Class	Neil Stanton	941		
Ind. Working Class	John Morley	933		
Turnout				
Labour win (new boundaries)				
Labour win (new boundaries)				
Labour win (new boundaries)				

=== Hylands ===
Hylands (3)
Party	Candidate	Votes	%	±%
Conservative	Barry Oddy	1,912		
Conservative	Georgina Galpin	1,860		
Conservative	Malcolm Brace	1,765		
Labour	Raymond Shaw	1,315		
Residents	Linda Winter	1,250		
Residents	Victoria Johnston-Messore	1,213		
Labour	Barry Norwin	1,166		
Labour	Victoria Walford	1,115		
Turnout				
Conservative win (new boundaries)				
Conservative win (new boundaries)				
Conservative win (new boundaries)				

=== Mawneys ===
Mawneys (3)
Party	Candidate	Votes	%	±%
Conservative	Derek Price	2,621		
Conservative	Alexandra Smith	2,588		
Conservative	Martin Smith	2,547		
Labour	Sheila McCole	1,525		
Labour	Margaret Mullane	1,494		
Labour	Comfort Usukumah	1,392		
Turnout				
Conservative win (new boundaries)				
Conservative win (new boundaries)				
Conservative win (new boundaries)				

=== Pettits ===
Pettits (3)
Party	Candidate	Votes	%	±%
Conservative	Joseph Webster	2,688		
Conservative	Henry Tebbutt	2,660		
Conservative	Ray Morgon	2,565		
Residents	Valerie Evans	2,005		
Residents	Ian Wilkes	1,991		
Residents	Denis Stevens	1,885		
Labour	Pamela Craig	659		
Labour	Richard Packer	625		
Labour	Herbert White	608		
Turnout				
Conservative win (new seat)				
Conservative win (new seat)				
Conservative win (new seat)				

=== Rainham and Wennington ===
Rainham and Wennington (3)
Party	Candidate	Votes	%	±%
Ind. Residents	Jeffrey Tucker	2,248		
Ind. Residents	Wayne Redgrave	2,086		
Ind. Residents	Brian Clarke	2,020		
Labour	Harry Webb	1,383		
Labour	Anthony Ellis	1,373		
Labour	Raymond Emmett	1,287		
Conservative	Maureen Carter	565		
Conservative	George Daniels	521		
Conservative	Dean Fackerell	480		
Turnout				
Ind. Residents win (new seat)				
Ind. Residents win (new seat)				
Ind. Residents win (new seat)				

=== Romford Town ===
Romford Town (3)
Party	Candidate	Votes	%	±%
Conservative	Andrew Curtin	2,336		
Conservative	Wendy Brice-Thompson	2,312		
Conservative	Frederick Thompson	2,238		
Labour	Angela Durso	1,205		
Labour	Robert Kilbey	1,143		
Labour	Peter McInerney	1,130		
Liberal Democrats	Peter Davies	710		
Liberal Democrats	Renee Giller	609		
Liberal Democrats	John Porter	605		
Turnout				
Conservative win (new seat)				
Conservative win (new seat)				
Conservative win (new seat)				

=== St Andrew's ===
St Andrew's (3)
Party	Candidate	Votes	%	±%
Residents	Christopher Oliver	2,069		
Residents	John Mylod	1,966		
Residents	Michael Winter	1,814		
Conservative	Carol Roberts	1,302		
Conservative	Robert Binion	1,115		
Labour	Terence Matthew	1,085		
Conservative	Jean Cockling	1,072		
Labour	Bryan Vincent	1,058		
Labour	Alan Scott	1,006		
UKIP	Terry Murray	232		
UKIP	Terry Murray	224		
National Liberal	Joseph Guiver	205		
UKIP	Lawrence Webb	204		
Turnout				
Residents win (new boundaries)				
Residents win (new boundaries)				
Residents win (new boundaries)				

=== South Hornchurch ===
South Hornchurch (3)
Party	Candidate	Votes	%	±%
Residents	Leonard Long	1,804		
Residents	Reginald Whitney	1,776		
Residents	Malvin Brown	1,539		
Labour	Christopher Purnell	1,368		
Labour	Jean Mitchell	1,149		
Labour	Michael Wood	1,139		
Conservative	John Carter	889		
Conservative	John Clark	869		
Conservative	Patricia Clark	847		
Turnout				
Residents win (new boundaries)				
Residents win (new boundaries)				
Residents win (new boundaries)				

=== Squirrel's Heath ===
Squirrel's Heath (3)
Party	Candidate	Votes	%	±%
Conservative	Edward Cahill	2,993		
Conservative	Eric Munday	2,965		
Conservative	Michael White	2,917		
Labour	David Harding	836		
Labour	Neil Brindley	817		
Labour	Stephen Jaques	803		
Liberal Democrats	Brian Taylor	593		
Liberal Democrats	Caroline Turner	584		
Liberal Democrats	Peter Spence	535		
Turnout				
Conservative win (new seat)				
Conservative win (new seat)				
Conservative win (new seat)				

=== Upminster ===
Upminster (3)
Party	Candidate	Votes	%	±%
Residents	Linda Hawthorn	4,202		
Residents	Owen Ware	4,119		
Residents	Muriel Mylod	4,082		
Conservative	Guy Gower	979		
Conservative	Susan Gower	950		
Conservative	Gloria Passannante	894		
Labour	Andrew Darvill	618		
Labour	Patricia Brown	520		
Labour	David Scott	456		
Green	Melanie Collins	297		
Turnout				
Residents win (new boundaries)				
Residents win (new boundaries)				
Residents win (new boundaries)				

== By-elections ==
The following by-elections took place between the 2002 and 2006 elections:

- 2003 Rainham and Wennington by-election (Labour gain from Ind. Residents)
- 2004 Rainham and Wennington by-election (Labour gain from Ind. Residents)
