= Collier Row (ward) =

Electoral ward in East London, England

- Former electoral ward for the Havering London Borough Council
- Collier Row ward boundaries from 1978 to 2002
- Borough: Havering
- County: Greater London
- Population: 7,387 (1991)
- Electorate: 8,226 (1964); 11,139 (1974); 5,824 (1978); 5,498 (1998)
- Major settlements: Collier Row

Former electoral ward
- Created: 1965
- Abolished: 2002
- Councillors: 1965–1978: 3; 1978–2002: 2

Collier Row was an electoral ward in the London Borough of Havering from 1965 to 2002. The ward was first used in the 1964 elections and last used for the 1998 elections. There was a revision of ward boundaries in 1978. It returned councillors to Havering London Borough Council, with three elected before 1978 and two thereafter.

== 1978–2002 Havering council elections ==
There was a revision of ward boundaries in Havering in 1978.

=== 1998 election ===
The election on 7 May 1998 took place on the same day as the 1998 Greater London Authority referendum.

1998 Havering London Borough Council election: Collier Row (2)
Party	Candidate	Votes	%	±%
Conservative	Andrew Curtin	883		
Conservative	Geoffrey Starns	828		
Labour	Pat Ridley	820		
Labour	Comfort Usukumah	786		
Turnout				
Conservative gain from Labour		Swing		
Conservative gain from Labour		Swing		

=== 1994 election ===
The election took place on 5 May 1994.

1994 Havering London Borough Council election: Collier Row (2)
Party	Candidate	Votes	%	±%
Labour	Stefan Koseda	1,543		
Labour	Pat Ridley	1,433		
Conservative	Eileen Bramwell	893		
Conservative	Patrick Curtin	839		
Turnout				
Labour hold		Swing		
Labour hold		Swing		

=== 1990 election ===
The election took place on 3 May 1990.

1990 Havering London Borough Council election: Collier Row (2)
Party	Candidate	Votes	%	±%
Labour	Stefan Koseda	1,406		
Labour	Pat Ridley	1,314		
Conservative	Robin Adaire	1,373		
Conservative	Patrick Curtin	1,322		
Turnout				
Labour gain from Conservative		Swing		
Labour gain from Conservative		Swing		

=== 1986 election ===
The election took place on 8 May 1986.

1986 Havering London Borough Council election: Collier Row (2)
Party	Candidate	Votes	%	±%
Conservative	Robin Adaire	984		
Conservative	Patrick Curtin	904		
Labour	Anthony Gordon	728		
Labour	Eileen Gordon	669		
Liberal Alliance FT	Edmund Longhorn	596		
Liberal Alliance FT	Angela Thompson	503		
Green	Andrew Smith	40		
Turnout				
Conservative hold		Swing		
Conservative hold		Swing		

=== 1982 election ===
The election took place on 6 May 1982.

1982 Havering London Borough Council election: Collier Row (2)
Party	Candidate	Votes	%	±%
Conservative	Robin Adaire	1,256		
Conservative	Norman Symonds	1,173		
Labour	Derek Marston	647		
Labour	Gordon Thompson	560		
Alliance	Roy Leighton	509		
Alliance	Edmund Longhorn	393		
Turnout				
Conservative hold		Swing		
Conservative hold		Swing		

=== 1978 election ===
The election took place on 2 May 1974.

1978 Havering London Borough Council election: Collier Row (2)
Party	Candidate	Votes	%	±%
Conservative	Robin Adaire	1,238		
Conservative	Norman Symonds	1,192		
Labour	Robert Kilbey	764		
Labour	Christine Blake	759		
Liberal	Eric Freeman	214		
Liberal	Keith Brewington	178		
Turnout				
Conservative win (new boundaries)				
Conservative win (new boundaries)				

== 1964–1978 Havering council elections ==
External images
- Map showing Collier Row ward boundaries from 1965 to 1978 (west)
- Map showing Collier Row ward boundaries from 1965 to 1978 (east)

=== 1974 election ===
The election took place on 2 May 1974.

1974 Havering London Borough Council election: Collier Row (3)
Party	Candidate	Votes	%	±%
Labour	Robert Kilbey	1,416		
Labour	Albert Mills	1,405		
Labour	A. Capon	1,402		
Conservative	F. Thompson	1,180		
Conservative	A. Maskall	1,171		
Conservative	G. Wright	1,135		
Liberal	E. Freeman	699		
Liberal	P. Smith	618		
Liberal	D. Rogerson	596		
Turnout				
Labour hold		Swing		
Labour hold		Swing		
Labour hold		Swing		

=== 1971 by-election ===
The by-election took place on 8 July 1971.

1971 Collier Row by-election
Party	Candidate	Votes	%	±%
Labour	Albert Mills	1,248		
Conservative	E. Joslin	489		
Communist	H. Reeves	20		
Turnout			16.0%	
Labour hold		Swing		

=== 1971 election ===
The election took place on 13 May 1971.

1971 Havering London Borough Council election: Collier Row (3)
Party	Candidate	Votes	%	±%
Labour	Bill Cole	2,522		
Labour	A. Capon	2,421		
Labour	Robert Kilbey	2,352		
Conservative	R. Adaire	2,352		
Conservative	E. Joslin	1,247		
Conservative	R. Daniels	1,229		
Communist	H. Reeves	96		
Turnout				
Labour hold		Swing		
Labour gain from Conservative		Swing		
Labour gain from Conservative		Swing		

=== 1969 by-election ===
The by-election took place on 16 October 1969.

1969 Collier Row by-election
Party	Candidate	Votes	%	±%
Labour	William Cole	1,365		
Conservative	N. Symonds	1189		
Communist	H. Reeves	75		
Turnout			26.7%	
Labour gain from Conservative		Swing		

=== 1968 election ===
The election took place on 9 May 1968.

1968 Havering London Borough Council election: Collier Row (3)
Party	Candidate	Votes	%	±%
Conservative	J. Higgs	2,146		
Conservative	E. Joslin	2,083		
Conservative	D. Keery	1,977		
Labour	L. Mills	1,265		
Labour	W. Cole	1,258		
Labour	J. Selby	1,200		
Communist	H. Reeves	188		
Turnout				
Conservative gain from Labour		Swing		
Conservative gain from Labour		Swing		
Conservative gain from Labour		Swing		

=== 1964 election ===
The election took place on 7 May 1964.

1964 Havering London Borough Council election: Collier Row (3)
Party	Candidate	Votes	%	±%
Labour	L. Mills	1,907		
Labour	William Cole	1,883		
Labour	I. Barker	1,816		
Conservative	W. Falk	1,262		
Conservative	E. Joslin	1,159		
Conservative	D. Ratcliffe	1,129		
Independent	J. Higgs	446		
Turnout		3,355	40.8	
Labour win (new seat)				
Labour win (new seat)				
Labour win (new seat)				
