= Central (Havering ward) =

Former electoral ward in the London Borough of Havering

- Former electoral ward for the Havering London Borough Council
- Borough: Havering
- County: Greater London
- Population: 11,200 (1966 estimate)
- Electorate: 8,041 (1964); 7,684 (1968); 7,775 (1971); 7,439 (1974)
- Major settlements: Romford
- Area: 771.1 acres (3.121 km^{2})

Former electoral ward
- Created: 1965
- Abolished: 1978
- Councillors: 3
- Replaced by: Brooklands, St Edward's

External images
- Map showing Central ward boundaries from 1965 to 1978 (west)
- Map showing Central ward boundaries from 1965 to 1978 (east)

Central was an electoral ward in the London Borough of Havering from 1965 to 1978. The ward was first used in the 1964 elections and last used for the 1974 elections. It returned three councillors to Havering London Borough Council. The ward covered central and western Romford to the north of the London–Shenfield railway line. For elections to the Greater London Council, the ward was part of the Havering electoral division from 1965 and then the Romford division from 1973.

== Havering council elections ==
=== 1974 election ===
The election took place on 2 May 1974.

1974 Havering London Borough Council election: Central (3)
Party	Candidate	Votes	%	±%
Labour	G. Cox	1,255		
Labour	J. Taylor	1,174		
Labour	S. Parish	1,117		
Conservative	W. Whittingham	991		
Conservative	R. Ramsey	986		
Conservative	N. Symonds	986		
Liberal	T. Beaver	480		
Liberal	E. Bates	417		
Liberal	G. Donnelly	401		
Communist	C. Harper	58		
Turnout				
Labour hold		Swing		
Labour hold		Swing		
Labour hold		Swing		

=== 1972 by-election ===
The by-election took place on 12 October 1972.

1972 Central by-election
Party	Candidate	Votes	%	±%
Labour	G. Cox	1,249		
Conservative	W. Whittingham	860		
Turnout			27.1%	
Labour hold		Swing		

=== 1971 election ===
The election took place on 13 May 1971.

1971 Havering London Borough Council election: Central (3)
Party	Candidate	Votes	%	±%
Labour	F. Carrick	1,867		
Labour	H. Miller	1,863		
Labour	J. Taylor	1,782		
Conservative	N. Symonds	1,310		
Conservative	A. Smith	1,270		
Conservative	W. Whittingham	1,258		
Communist	C. Harper	193		
Turnout				
Labour gain from Conservative		Swing		
Labour gain from Conservative		Swing		
Labour gain from Conservative		Swing		

=== 1968 election ===
The election took place on 9 May 1968.

1968 Havering London Borough Council election: Central (3)
Party	Candidate	Votes	%	±%
Conservative	L. Ellis	1,849		
Conservative	W. Falk	1,807		
Conservative	W. Whittingham	1,754		
Labour	A. Thomas	799		
Labour	J. Stevenson	750		
Labour	K. Olsen	721		
Communist	C. Harper	214		
Turnout				
Conservative gain from Labour		Swing		
Conservative gain from Labour		Swing		
Conservative gain from Labour		Swing		

=== 1964 election ===
The election took place on 7 May 1964.

1964 Havering London Borough Council election: Central (3)
Party	Candidate	Votes	%	±%
Labour	Arthur Hawkesworth	1,827		
Labour	A. Thomas	1,728		
Labour	Reta Coffin	1,721		
Conservative	A. Smith	1,294		
Conservative	M. Course	1,277		
Conservative	V. Eades	1,211		
Independent	F. Daly	382		
Independent	M. Bates	322		
Turnout		3,350	41.7	
Labour win (new seat)				
Labour win (new seat)				
Labour win (new seat)				
