= 1978 Havering London Borough Council election =

- 4 May 1978

All 63 Havering London Borough Council seats 32 seats needed for a majority
	First party	Second party	Third party
	CON	RES	LAB
Party	Conservative	Residents	Labour
Seats won	38	13 (Note: Includes all candidates elected as (Independent) Residents or Ratepayers)	12
Seat change	▲18	▲4	▼8

The 1978 Havering Council election took place on 4 May 1978 to elect members of Havering London Borough Council in London, England. The whole council was up for election and the Conservative Party gained overall control of the council for the second time.

== Electoral arrangements ==
The election was originally scheduled for 1977, but was delayed for one year to bring London borough council elections into a four-year election cycle. (Note: Terms were extended by the London Councillors Order 1976.) New ward boundaries were used for the first time. Prior to the 1978 election the council had 64 members (55 councillors and 9 aldermen). From the 1978 election, 63 councillors were elected from 25 wards. Each ward returned two or three councillors.

Ten of the wards were entirely new, including Airfield ward covering the new Airfield estate in Hornchurch. The remaining wards shared the names of previously used wards but with new boundaries. Councillors were elected for a four-year term with the next election scheduled for 1982.

Polling took place on 4 May 1978, except in Gooshays ward where the election was delayed until 25 May 1978, due to the death of a candidate.

== Results ==
With 38 seats, the Conservative Party won overall control of the council for the second time. Labour Party wins were concentrated in the wards covering the Harold Hill estate (Heaton, Hilldene and Gooshays) with the addition of the new Airfield ward in Hornchurch. Residents and ratepayers candidates were successful in the two seats covering Cranham (Cranham East and Cranham West) as well as Rainham and wards covering southern Hornchurch (Hacton and South Hornchurch).

== Ward results ==
=== Airfield ===
Airfield (3)
Party	Candidate	Votes	%	±%
Labour	Stephen Clarke	1,479		
Labour	Thomas Mitchell	1,461		
Labour	Sydney Jack	1,396		
Conservative	Edward Hoad	990		
Conservative	Martin Shipp	962		
Conservative	Margaret Munday	947		
Ind. Residents	Andrew Carew	524		
Ind. Residents	Brenda Hammond	440		
Ind. Residents	Joan Lewis	403		
Turnout				
Labour win (new seat)				
Labour win (new seat)				
Labour win (new seat)				

=== Ardleigh Green ===
Ardleigh Green (2)
Party	Candidate	Votes	%	±%
Conservative	Thomas Sims	1,856		
Conservative	Leonard Trott	1,842		
Labour	Glenys Chandley	559		
Labour	Dorothy Robinson	541		
Ind. Residents	Ian Wilkes	541		
Ind. Residents	Jack Lewis	421		
Turnout				
Conservative win (new seat)				
Conservative win (new seat)				

=== Brooklands ===
Brooklands (2)
Party	Candidate	Votes	%	±%
Conservative	Henry Tebbutt	1,233		
Conservative	Meirion Owens	1,209		
Labour	George Cox	1,141		
Labour	Jesse Taylor	1,063		
Turnout				
Conservative win (new seat)				
Conservative win (new seat)				

=== Chase Cross ===
Chase Cross (2)
Party	Candidate	Votes	%	±%
Conservative	Randall Evans	1,235		
Conservative	William Odulate	1,172		
Labour	Arthur Latham	961		
Labour	Sydney Parrish	863		
Communist	Colin Harper	84		
Turnout				
Conservative win (new seat)				
Conservative win (new seat)				

=== Collier Row ===
Collier Row (2)
Party	Candidate	Votes	%	±%
Conservative	Robin Adaire	1,238		
Conservative	Norman Symonds	1,192		
Labour	Robert Kilbey	764		
Labour	Christine Blake	759		
Liberal	Eric Freeman	214		
Liberal	Keith Brewington	178		
Turnout				
Conservative win (new boundaries)				
Conservative win (new boundaries)				

=== Cranham East ===
Cranham East (2)
Party	Candidate	Votes	%	±%
Ind. Ratepayers	Rowland Knell	1,544		
Ind. Ratepayers	Jean Mitchell	1,496		
Conservative	Peter Gardner	955		
Conservative	Stephen Brabner	922		
Labour	Tom Horlock	544		
Labour	Frances Eldred	529		
Turnout				
Majority				
Ind. Ratepayers win (new seat)				
Ind. Ratepayers win (new seat)				

=== Cranham West ===
Cranham West (2)
Party	Candidate	Votes	%	±%
Ind. Ratepayers	Ron Ower	1,824		
Ind. Ratepayers	Louisa Sinclair	1,811		
Conservative	Mary Noyes	988		
Conservative	John Smith	877		
Labour	Susan Kortlandt	239		
Labour	Helena Cowin	230		
Turnout				
Ind. Ratepayers win (new seat)				
Ind. Ratepayers win (new seat)				

=== Elm Park ===
Elm Park (3)
Party	Candidate	Votes	%	±%
Conservative	Joan Arthur	1,894		
Conservative	Margaret Ashby	1,881		
Conservative	Leslie Reilly	1,852		
Labour	George Saunders	1,806		
Labour	David Burn	1,779		
Labour	Jack Hoepelman	1,761		
Liberal	Mark Long	204		
Liberal	Thomas Rimmer	202		
Liberal	Keith Penfold	193		
National Front	Robert Baldwin	184		
National Front	Alfred Harris	179		
National Front	Alan Newell	154		
Turnout				
Conservative win (new boundaries)				
Conservative win (new boundaries)				
Conservative win (new boundaries)				

=== Emerson Park ===
Emerson Park (2)
Party	Candidate	Votes	%	±%
Conservative	John Moultrie	2,323		
Conservative	William Sibley	2,241		
Labour	John Scott	524		
Labour	Glyn Harris	479		
Ind. Residents	Lynn Lewis	249		
Turnout				
Conservative win (new boundaries)				
Conservative win (new boundaries)				

=== Gidea Park ===
Gidea Park (2)
Party	Candidate	Votes	%	±%
Conservative	John Johnston	2,090		
Conservative	Alice Smith	1,998		
Labour	Judith Paul	428		
Labour	Anthony Gordon	419		
Turnout				
Conservative win (new boundaries)				
Conservative win (new boundaries)				

=== Gooshays ===
Gooshays (3)
Party	Candidate	Votes	%	±%
Labour	Ronald Lynn	1,495		
Labour	Valentine Birnie	1,408		
Labour	Wilf Mills	1,396		
Conservative	Alison Bush	825		
Conservative	Helen Forster	816		
Conservative	Pamela Marsden	765		
National Front	Albert Yetton	147		
Turnout				
Labour win (new boundaries)				
Labour win (new boundaries)				
Labour win (new boundaries)				

=== Hacton ===
Hacton (3)
Party	Candidate	Votes	%	±%
Residents	Albert Davis	1,515		
Residents	Norman Miles	1,469		
Residents	Norman Richards	1,376		
Conservative	Norman Kemble	1,271		
Conservative	Frederick Thompson	1,234		
Conservative	Wendy Thompson	1,055		
Labour	Ernest Rawlins	962		
Labour	Gordon Thompson	921		
Labour	Cyril Whitelock	885		
Turnout				
Residents win (new boundaries)				
Residents win (new boundaries)				
Residents win (new boundaries)				

=== Harold Wood ===
Harold Wood (3)
Party	Candidate	Votes	%	±%
Conservative	David Forster	2,393		
Conservative	Peter Marsden	2,287		
Conservative	Robert Neill	2,255		
Labour	John McCarthy	1,024		
Labour	Brian Morland	957		
Labour	Hubert Hull	942		
Turnout				
Conservative win (new boundaries)				
Conservative win (new boundaries)				
Conservative win (new boundaries)				

=== Heath Park ===
Heath Park (2)
Party	Candidate	Votes	%	±%
Conservative	Eric Munday	1,993		
Conservative	William Smith	1,954		
Labour	Dennis Cook	575		
Labour	Pearl Saunders	566		
Liberal	Susan Brewington	219		
Turnout				
Conservative win (new seat)				
Conservative win (new seat)				

=== Heaton ===
Heaton (3)
Party	Candidate	Votes	%	±%
Labour	Robert Harris	1,632		
Labour	Denis O'Flynn	1,567		
Labour	Geoffrey Otter	1,465		
Conservative	Nigel Boyle	972		
Conservative	John Hann	956		
Conservative	Julian Chiningworth	942		
Turnout				
Labour win (new boundaries)				
Labour win (new boundaries)				
Labour win (new boundaries)				

=== Hilldene ===
Hilldene (3)
Party	Candidate	Votes	%	±%
Labour	Reg Whiting	1,479		
Labour	Bessie Whitworth	1,440		
Labour	Ron Whitworth	1,412		
Conservative	Stanley Martin	771		
Conservative	Geoffrey Wright	729		
Conservative	Jane Wright	695		
Turnout				
Labour win (new boundaries)				
Labour win (new boundaries)				
Labour win (new boundaries)				

=== Hylands ===
Hylands (3)
Party	Candidate	Votes	%	±%
Conservative	Jean Frost	1,855		
Conservative	Irene Pearce	1,803		
Conservative	Frederick Roberts	1,779		
Labour	Alan Prescott	1,563		
Labour	Peter Osborne	1,542		
Labour	Stewart Binns	1,484		
Liberal	Henry King	203		
Liberal	John Hewitt	195		
Liberal	Brian McCarthy	193		
Ind. Ratepayers	Pamela Wilkes	155		
Ind. Ratepayers	Kenneth Mainstone	127		
Ind. Ratepayers	Laurence Munroe	123		
Turnout				
Conservative win (new boundaries)				
Conservative win (new boundaries)				
Conservative win (new boundaries)				

=== Mawney ===
Mawney (3)
Party	Candidate	Votes	%	±%
Conservative	Victor Bush	2,030		
Conservative	Lucy Whittingham	1,889		
Conservative	Nigel Regnier	1,835		
Labour	Ruby Latham	1,394		
Labour	Michael Blake	1,392		
Labour	Wallace Russell	1,322		
Liberal	Joan Freeman	286		
Liberal	Pauline Longthorn	249		
Turnout				
Conservative win (new boundaries)				
Conservative win (new boundaries)				
Conservative win (new boundaries)				

=== Oldchurch ===
Oldchurch (2)
Party	Candidate	Votes	%	±%
Conservative	Derek Price	933		
Conservative	William Todd	932		
Labour	Ronald Baker	770		
Labour	Jocelyn Spindler	668		
National Front	Madeline Caine	90		
National Front	Elsie Harris	82		
Turnout				
Conservative win (new seat)				
Conservative win (new seat)				

=== Rainham ===
Rainham (3)
Party	Candidate	Votes	%	±%
Residents	Henry Turner	1,756		
Residents	Donald Poole	1,667		
Residents	George Mooney	1,566		
Labour	Henry Webb	1,192		
Labour	Raymond Emmett	1,117		
Labour	Harry Moss	978		
Conservative	Audrey North	731		
Conservative	Kieran Humphries	703		
Conservative	David Cordell	687		
Turnout				
Residents win (new boundaries)				
Residents win (new boundaries)				
Residents win (new boundaries)				

=== Rise Park ===
Rise Park (2)
Party	Candidate	Votes	%	±%
Conservative	Evan Davies	1,876		
Conservative	Christopher Kemp	1,716		
Labour	Alfred Capon	545		
Labour	Sheila Hills	497		
Liberal	Terry Hurlstone	282		
Liberal	Caroline Hurlstone	278		
Turnout				
Conservative win (new seat)				
Conservative win (new seat)				

=== St Andrew's ===
St Andrew's (3)
Party	Candidate	Votes	%	±%
Conservative	Albert James	2,063		
Conservative	David Biddlecombe	1,998		
Conservative	Thomas Orrin	2,012		
Labour	Keith Dutton	906		
Labour	Margaret Hoepelman	850		
Labour	Margaret Jack	844		
Ind. Residents	Frank Everett	720		
Ind. Residents	Angela Meads	711		
Ind. Residents	Herbert Borley	169		
Liberal	John Green	169		
Liberal	Adrienne McCarthy	158		
Liberal	Trevor Wood	142		
Turnout				
Conservative win (new boundaries)				
Conservative win (new boundaries)				
Conservative win (new boundaries)				

=== St Edward's ===
St Edward's (2)
Party	Candidate	Votes	%	±%
Conservative	Lydia Hutton	1,631		
Conservative	Roger Ramsey	1,549		
Labour	Jeannette Bowyer	635		
Labour	Albert Mills	556		
Turnout				
Conservative win (new seat)				
Conservative win (new seat)				

=== South Hornchurch ===
South Hornchurch (3)
Party	Candidate	Votes	%	±%
Residents	Leonard Long	1,384		
Residents	Michael Burke	1,317		
Residents	Ronald Whittaker	1,299		
Labour	Harry Rivers	1,249		
Labour	Richard Desmond	1,201		
Labour	Lynne Cunningham	1,179		
Conservative	Ralph Pollard	889		
Conservative	Robin Hackshall	870		
Conservative	Mary Oxley	859		
Turnout				
Residents win (new boundaries)				
Residents win (new boundaries)				
Residents win (new boundaries)				

=== Upminster ===
Upminster (3)
Party	Candidate	Votes	%	±%
Conservative	Bruce Gordon-Picking	2,613		
Conservative	Rodney Chamberlain	2,547		
Conservative	Joyce White	2,467		
Ratepayers	Geoffrey Lewis	1,991		
Ratepayers	Carol Springthorpe	1,943		
Ratepayers	Owen Ware	1,920		
Labour	Megan Lamb	449		
Labour	Joseph Moore	365		
Labour	William Nicholls	351		
Turnout				
Conservative win (new boundaries)				
Conservative win (new boundaries)				
Conservative win (new boundaries)				

== By-elections ==
The following by-elections took place between the 1978 and 1982 elections:

- 1978 St Andrew's (Havering) by-election
- 1980 Gooshays by-election
- 1980 Heaton (Havering) by-election
- 1980 Rise Park by-election
- 1981 Upminster by-election (Ratepayers gain from Conservative)
