= Emerson Park (ward) =

Electoral ward in the London Borough of Havering, England

- Electoral ward for the Havering London Borough Council
- Emerson Park ward boundaries since 2022
- Borough: Havering
- County: Greater London
- Population: 9,535 (2021) (Note: 2021 Census data reported for 2022 ward boundaries)
- Electorate: 7,241 (2022)
- Major settlements: Emerson Park
- Area: 3.752 square kilometres (1.449 sq mi)

Current electoral ward
- Created: 1965
- Number of members: 1965–2022: 3; 2022–present: 2
- Councillors: David Johnson; Alex Sibley
- GSS code: E05013970 (2022–present)

Emerson Park is an electoral ward in the London Borough of Havering. The ward has existed since the creation of the borough on 1 April 1965 and was first used in the 1964 elections. It returns councillors to Havering London Borough Council.

== Havering council elections since 2022 ==
There was a revision of ward boundaries in Havering in 2022.

=== 2026 election ===
The election took place on 7 May 2026.

2026 Havering London Borough Council election: Emerson Park (2)
Party	Candidate	Votes	%	±%
Reform	David Johnson	1,306	34.5	N/A
Reform	Alex Sibley	1,255	33.2	N/A
Havering Residents Association	Stuart Chapell	1,098	29.0	−23.5
Havering Residents Association	Paul Harrison	1,098	29.0	−23.0
Conservative	Bernice Robertson	866	22.9	−10.0
Conservative	Dominic Swan	795	21.0	−8.0
Labour	Balwinder Khaira	272	7.2	−4.3
Green	Ghazala Ansari	226	6.0	N/A
Labour	Christopher Purnell	222	5.9	−5.6
Green	Linda Pollard	210	5.5	N/A
Liberal Democrats	Jordan Jai	47	1.2	−1.0
Turnout			52.8	
Reform gain from Havering Residents Association		Swing		
Reform gain from Havering Residents Association		Swing		

=== 2022 election ===
The election took place on 5 May 2022.

2022 Havering London Borough Council election: Emerson Park (2)
Party	Candidate	Votes	%	±%
Residents	Laurance Garrard	1,512	52.5	
Residents	David Godwin	1,498	52.0	
Conservative	Dominic Swan	947	32.9	
Conservative	Noshaba Khiljee	835	29.0	
Labour	Anil Gupta	331	11.5	
Labour	Michael McCarthy	331	11.5	
Independent	Sharon Heron	104	3.6	
Independent	Victoria Hogan	95	3.3	
Liberal Democrats	Pamela Coles	64	2.2	
Liberal Democrats	Graham Potter	44	1.5	
Turnout			41.11%	
Majority		558	19.1	
Residents win (new boundaries)				
Residents win (new boundaries)				

== 2002–2022 Havering council elections ==
Emerson Park ward boundaries from 2002 to 2022

There was a revision of ward boundaries in Havering in 2002.

=== 2018 election ===
The election took place on 3 May 2018.

2018 Havering London Borough Council election: Emerson Park (3)
Party	Candidate	Votes	%	±%
Conservative	Roger Ramsey	1,857	46.1	
Conservative	Robert Perry	1,790	44.4	
Conservative	Matthew Sutton	1,495	37.1	
Residents	Laurance Garrard	1,491	37.0	
Residents	David Godwin	1,434	35.6	
Residents	John Stone	1,393	34.6	
Labour	Anil Gupta	570	14.1	
Labour	Susan Bearman	553	13.7	
Labour	Edwyn Mayhew	448	11.1	
UKIP	David Johnson	269	6.7	
Green	Ian Pirie	187	4.6	
Liberal Democrats	Graham Potter	89	2.2	
Turnout			41.18%	
Majority		4		
Conservative hold		Swing		
Conservative hold		Swing		
Conservative gain from UKIP		Swing		

=== 2014 election ===
The election took place on 22 May 2014.

2014 Havering London Borough Council election: Emerson Park (3)
Party	Candidate	Votes	%	±%
Conservative	Roger Ramsey	1,661		
Conservative	Steven Kelly	1,499		
UKIP	John Glanville	1,450		
Conservative	Paul Rochford	1,414		
Residents	Irene Eagling	1,408		
Residents	Laurance Garrard	1,364		
Residents	Christopher Wilkins	1,159		
Labour	Graham Bramley	482		
Labour	Christopher Purnell	425		
Labour	Terence Hughes	405		
Green	Carina Ancell	313		
Liberal Democrats	Graham Potter	89		
Turnout			46	
Conservative hold		Swing		
Conservative hold		Swing		
UKIP gain from Conservative		Swing		

=== 2010 election ===
The election on 6 May 2010 took place on the same day as the United Kingdom general election.

2010 Havering London Borough Council election: Emerson Park (3)
Party	Candidate	Votes	%	±%
Conservative	Roger Ramsey	3,851		
Conservative	Steven Kelly	3,507		
Conservative	Paul Rochford	3,331		
Labour	Julia Darvill	1,238		
Residents	Joan Kaye	1,221		
Labour	Christopher Purnell	1,139		
Labour	Neil Brindley	1,133		
Residents	Irene Eagling	1,094		
UKIP	John Glanville	1,007		
Residents	Nina Willers	985		
Independent	Nakkeeran Arasaratnam	146		
Independent	Ronald Lockhart	130		
Turnout				
Conservative hold		Swing		
Conservative hold		Swing		
Conservative hold		Swing		

=== 2006 election ===
The election took place on 4 May 2006.

2006 Havering London Borough Council election: Emerson Park (3)
Party	Candidate	Votes	%	±%
Conservative	Roger Ramsey	2,495	61.8	
Conservative	Steven Kelly	2,373		
Conservative	Paul Rochford	2,291		
Residents	Jacqueline Long	679	16.8	
Residents	John Corrigan	675		
Residents	Giovanni Anastasi	597		
Labour	Terence Hughes	470		
Labour	Frances Chalk	470	11.6	
Labour	Sean Willis	425		
UKIP	Sunita Seenath	214	5.3	
Independent	Julia Fraser	179	4.4	
Independent	Robert Samson	151		
Independent	Gregory Segal	100		
Turnout			41.8	
Conservative hold		Swing		
Conservative hold		Swing		
Conservative hold		Swing		

=== 2002 election ===
The election took place on 2 May 2002. As an experiment, it was a postal voting election, with the option to hand the papers in on election day.

2002 Havering London Borough Council election: Emerson Park (3)
Party	Candidate	Votes	%	±%
Conservative	Roger Ramsey	2,853		
Conservative	Peter Gardner	2,747		
Conservative	Paul Rochford	2,727		
Labour	Pamela Reid	767		
Labour	Irene Eagling	737		
Labour	Terence Hughes	720		
Residents	Valerie Morris	646		
Residents	John Parker	607		
Residents	Ron Ower	593		
Liberal Democrats	Madge Mulliner	331		
Liberal Democrats	Helen Tegg	331		
Liberal Democrats	Albert Rabone	309		
Turnout				
Conservative win (new boundaries)				
Conservative win (new boundaries)				
Conservative win (new boundaries)				

== 1978–2002 Havering council elections ==
Emerson Park ward boundaries from 1978 to 2002

There was a revision of ward boundaries in Havering in 1978.

=== 1998 election ===
The election on 7 May 1998 took place on the same day as the 1998 Greater London Authority referendum.

1998 Havering London Borough Council election: Emerson Park
Party	Candidate	Votes	%	±%
Conservative	Peter Gardner	1,019		
Conservative	Paul Rochford	981		
Labour	Maureen Scott	594		
Ind. Residents	Anthony Benton	591		
Ind. Residents	James Saunders	573		
Labour	Ronald Whitworth	506		
Liberal Democrats	Graham Watkins	184		
Liberal Democrats	Garry White	178		
Turnout				
Conservative hold				
Conservative hold				

=== 1994 election ===
The election took place on 5 May 1994.

1994 Havering London Borough Council election: Emerson Park (2)
Party	Candidate	Votes	%	±%
Conservative	Roger Ramsey	1,647	51.33	▼10.94
Conservative	Angela Watkinson	1,567		
Labour	Martyn Cooper	865	26.57	▲0.38
Labour	Keith Dutton	798		
Liberal Democrats	David Bowman	724	22.10	▲10.55
Liberal Democrats	Ian Sanderson	660		
Registered electors		7,169		▲54
Turnout		3,172	44.25	▼3.97
Rejected ballots		4	0.13	▼0.16
Conservative hold		Swing		
Conservative hold		Swing		

=== 1990 election ===
The election took place on 3 May 1990.

1990 Havering London Borough Council election: Emerson Park (2)
Party	Candidate	Votes	%	±%
Conservative	Roger Ramsey	2,119	62.27	
Conservative	Kenneth Roe	1,947		
Labour	Joseph Moore	865	26.19	
Labour	Gordon Thompson	845		
Liberal Democrats	Albert Rabone	379	11.55	
Liberal Democrats	John Porter	375		
Registered electors		7,105		
Turnout		3,423	48.18	
Rejected ballots		10	0.29	
Conservative hold		Swing		
Conservative hold		Swing		

=== 1986 election ===
The election took place on 8 May 1986.

1986 Havering London Borough Council election: Emerson Park
Party	Candidate	Votes	%	±%
Conservative	Roger Ramsey	1,853		
Conservative	Kenneth Roe	1,647		
Alliance	Antony Gunton	615		
Alliance	John Smailes	555		
Labour	Peter Baines	470		
Labour	Sheila Hills	427		
Green	David Marshall	95		
Turnout				
Conservative hold		Swing		
Conservative hold		Swing		

=== 1982 election ===
The election took place on 6 May 1982.

1982 Havering London Borough Council election: Emerson Park
Party	Candidate	Votes	%	±%
Conservative	Jack Moultrie	2,178		
Conservative	Bill Sibley	2,103		
Alliance	Malcolm Inman	753		
Alliance	Frederick Trotman	733		
Labour	Arthur Oliver	316		
Labour	Dereck Smith	269		
Turnout				
Majority				
Conservative hold		Swing		
Conservative hold		Swing		

=== 1978 election ===
The election took place on 4 May 1978.

1978 Havering London Borough Council election: Emerson Park (2)
Party	Candidate	Votes	%	±%
Conservative	Jack Moultrie	2,323		
Conservative	Bill Sibley	2,241		
Labour	John Scott	524		
Labour	Glyn Harris	479		
Ind. Residents	Lynn Lewis	249		
Turnout				
Conservative win (new boundaries)				
Conservative win (new boundaries)				

== 1964–1978 Havering council elections ==
External image
- Map showing Emerson Pakr ward boundaries from 1965 to 1978

=== 1975 by-election ===
The by-election took place on 18 September 1975, following the death of Dennis Peters.

1975 Emerson Park by-election
Party	Candidate	Votes	%	±%
Conservative	Leonard Trott	2,118		
Labour	John Scott	325		
Liberal	Keith Brewington	251		
Ind. Ratepayers	Ian Wilkes	80		
Turnout			25.9	
Conservative hold		Swing		

=== 1974 election ===
The election took place on 2 May 1974.

1974 Havering London Borough Council election: Emerson Park (3)
Party	Candidate	Votes	%	±%
Conservative	Jack Moultrie	2,774		
Conservative	Bill Sibley	2,728		
Conservative	Dennis Peters	2,718		
Labour	P. Saunders	667		
Labour	M. Hoepelman	634		
Labour	G. Harris	632		
Liberal	C. Hamilton	403		
Ind. Ratepayers	J. Whitton-Williams	370		
Liberal	D. de Sarandy	368		
Ind. Ratepayers	P. Whitton-Williams	363		
Ind. Ratepayers	I. Wilkes	357		
Liberal	D. Kruger	346		
Turnout				
Conservative hold		Swing		
Conservative hold		Swing		
Conservative hold		Swing		

=== 1971 by-election ===
The by-election took place on 25 November 1971.

1971 Emerson Park by-election
Party	Candidate	Votes	%	±%
Conservative	T. Kemp	1,088		
Labour	I. Whysall	437		
Ind. Ratepayers	J. Bates	241		
Liberal	B. Sell	128		
Turnout			17.9%	
Conservative hold		Swing		

=== 1971 election ===
The election took place on 13 May 1971.

1971 Havering London Borough Council election: Emerson Park (3)
Party	Candidate	Votes	%	±%
Conservative	Jack Moultrie	2,339		
Conservative	E. Gallant	2,317		
Conservative	Bill Sibley	2,303		
Labour	J. Gillman	1135		
Labour	G. Mulhern	1116		
Labour	D. Ramstead	1099		
Ind. Ratepayers	J. Bates	382		
Ind. Ratepayers	I. Wilkes	346		
Ind. Ratepayers	G. Morris	340		
Liberal	J. Bastick	287		
Liberal	A. Chudley	279		
Liberal	S. Howard	266		
Turnout				
Conservative hold		Swing		
Conservative hold		Swing		
Conservative hold		Swing		

=== 1968 election ===
The election took place on 9 May 1968.

1968 Havering London Borough Council election: Emerson Park (3)
Party	Candidate	Votes	%	±%
Conservative	R. Carnaby	3,446		
Conservative	E. Gallant	3,392		
Conservative	N. Kemble	3,313		
Liberal	P. Ratchford	643		
Liberal	J. Bastick	614		
Labour	B. Whitworth	465		
Labour	A. Mais	439		
Labour	R. Whitworth	435		
Turnout				
Conservative hold		Swing		
Conservative hold		Swing		
Conservative hold		Swing		

=== 1964 election ===
The election took place on 7 May 1964.

1964 Havering London Borough Council election: Emerson Park (3)
Party	Candidate	Votes	%	±%
Conservative	Jack Moultrie	2,312		
Conservative	E. Foye	2,305		
Conservative	Bill Sibley	2,271		
Labour	S. Mugaseth	1,225		
Labour	P. Rudlin	1,222		
Labour	V. Murphy	1,207		
Liberal	W. West	828		
Liberal	O. Hill	722		
Liberal	A. Watts	712		
Turnout		4,341	46.7	
Conservative win (new seat)				
Conservative win (new seat)				
Conservative win (new seat)				
