= Michael Ward (British politician) =

British politician (1931–2009)

Michael John Ward
- Ward in 1978

Member of Parliament for Peterborough
- In office 10 October 1974 – 7 April 1979
- Preceded by: Sir Harmar Nicholls, Bt
- Succeeded by: Brian Mawhinney

Personal details
- Born: 7 April 1931
- Died: 25 March 2009 (aged 77)
- Party: Labour

Michael John Ward (7 April 1931 – 25 March 2009) was a British Labour politician.

Ward was educated at Royal Liberty Grammar School, Romford and Manchester University. He became a local government advisor and director of a public relations firm. He was elected to Romford Borough Council in 1958, and was subsequently elected to the Heaton ward of its replacement, Havering London Borough Council, in 1964. He served as leader of the council at Havering from 1971 to 1974. He was a member of the Essex River Authority from 1964 and local government officer at the Labour Party 1961–65.

Having contested the seat three times previously, losing by three votes in 1966 after seven recounts and by 22 votes in February 1974, Ward was elected as the Member of Parliament (MP) for Peterborough in the October 1974 general election, defeating the Conservative Party's incumbent Sir Harmar Nicholls. He served as Parliamentary Private Secretary to Reg Prentice, Secretary of State for Education and Science, and after Prentice left the government, Ward was PPS to Bill Rodgers, Minister of State in the Foreign Office. However, in 1979, Ward lost the marginal Peterborough seat to the Conservative Brian Mawhinney. Ward subsequently joined the Social Democratic Party (SDP) but later rejoined Labour, working for the Greenwich Constituency Labour Party. In 2005, his daughter Alison Seabeck was elected the Labour MP for Plymouth Devonport.

Ward also served as the chairman of Charlton Triangle Homes in South East London. He was also the chairman of the Greenwich Labour Party Local Government Committee from 1996 until 2000 and of the Rochester and Strood Labour Party from 2003 until 2007.

Parliament of the United Kingdom
Preceded by Sir Harmar Nicholls, Bt	Member of Parliament for Peterborough; October 1974 – 1979	Succeeded by Brian Mawhinney
