= Harold Wood (ward) =

Electoral ward in the London Borough of Havering

- Electoral ward for the Havering London Borough Council
- Harold Wood ward boundaries since 2022
- Borough: Havering
- County: Greater London
- Population: 13,807 (2021) (Note: 2021 Census data reported for 2022 ward boundaries)
- Electorate: 10,236 (2022)
- Major settlements: Harold Wood
- Area: 7.786 square kilometres (3.006 sq mi)

Current electoral ward
- Created: 1965
- Number of members: 3
- Councillors: Brian Eagling; Martin Goode; Darren Wise
- GSS code: E05000312 (2002–2022); E05013973 (2022–present)

Harold Wood is an electoral ward in the London Borough of Havering. The ward has existed since the creation of the borough on 1 April 1965 and was first used in the 1964 elections. It returns three councillors to Havering London Borough Council. The ward had boundary revisions in 1978, 1994, 2002 and 2022. The most notable councillor was Bob Neill who became a member of parliament.

== List of councillors ==
Seat	Councillor	Took office	Left office	Party	Election
1	E. Gallant	1964	1968	Conservative	1964
2	N. Kemble	1964	1968	Conservative	1964
3	J. Smith	1964	1971	Conservative	1964, 1968
1	J. Frost	1968	1971	Conservative	1968
2	D. Owen	1968	1971	Conservative	1968
1	T. Ward	1971	1974	Labour	1971
2	R. Whitworth	1971	1974	Labour	1971
3	Geoffrey Otter	1971	1974	Labour	1971
1	David Forster	1974	1986	Conservative	1974, 1978, 1982
2	Bob Neill	1974	1990	Conservative	1974 ... 1986
3	Peter Marsden	1974	1986	Conservative	1974, 1978, 1982
1	Pamela Light	1986	1990	Conservative	1986
3	Harry Humphrey	1986	1990	Conservative	1986
1	John Wilson	1990	1994	Liberal Democrats	1990
2	Mark Wilson	1990	1994	Liberal Democrats	1990
3	Kevyn Jones	1990	1994	Liberal Democrats	1990
1	Jonathan Coles	1994	2002	Liberal Democrats	1994, 1998
2	Caroline Hurlstone	1994	1998	Liberal Democrats	1994
3	David Parker-Ross	1994	1998	Liberal Democrats	1994
2	Brian Eagling	1998	2002	Labour	1998
3	Caroline Wood	1998	2002	Labour	1998
1	Steven Kelly	2002	2006	Conservative	2002
2	Natasha Ratty	2002	2006	Conservative	2002
3	Daryl Williams	2002	2006	Conservative	2002
1	Lesley Kelly	2006	2014	Conservative	2006, 2010
2	Pamela Light	2006	2014	Conservative	2006, 2010
3	Jonathan Coles	2006	2010	Liberal Democrats	2006
3	Brian Eagling	2010	Incumbent	Harold Wood Hill Park RA	2010 ... 2026
1	Darren Wise	2014	Incumbent	Harold Wood Hill Park RA	2014 ... 2026
2	Alex Donald	2014	2018	Harold Wood Hill Park RA	2014
2	Martin Goode	2018	Incumbent	Harold Wood Hill Park RA	2018, 2022, 2026

== Summary ==
Councillors elected by party at each general borough election.

- Conservative
- Labour
- Liberal Democrats
- Residents

== Havering council elections since 2022 ==
There was a revision of ward boundaries in Havering in 2022. The ward lost territory to Gooshays and Heaton, and gained territory from Cranham and Emerson Park.

=== 2026 election ===
The election took place on 7 May 2026.

2026 Havering London Borough Council election: Harold Wood
Party	Candidate	Votes	%	±%
Harold Wood Hill Park RA	Brian Eagling	2,423		
Harold Wood Hill Park RA	Martin Goode	2,269		
Harold Wood Hill Park RA	Darren Wise	2,209		
Reform	Ryan Russel	1,402		
Reform	Kevin Godfrey	1,375		
Reform	Steven Ince	1,375		
Green	Marion Sanders	415		
Green	Anish Kothari	396		
Green	Alex Short	364		
Labour	Jonathan Appiah Bruce	353		
Conservative	Ruth Edes	342		
Conservative	Esme Fay	316		
Conservative	Denise Speight	278		
Labour	Siva Kumar	267		
Labour	Ramkumar Rengarajan	240		
Liberal Democrats	Jonathan Coles	135		
Independent	David Durant (Note: Councillor for Rainham and Wennington from 2010 to 2022. Stood as an Independent Residents Association candidate.)	134		
Liberal Democrats	Ian Sanderson	118		
Turnout			48.19	
Harold Wood Hill Park RA hold		Swing		
Harold Wood Hill Park RA hold		Swing		
Harold Wood Hill Park RA hold		Swing		

=== 2022 election ===
The election took place on 5 May 2022.

2022 Havering London Borough Council election: Harold Wood
Party	Candidate	Votes	%	±%
Ind. Residents	Brian Eagling	2,081	58.5	−10.2
Ind. Residents	Martin Goode	1,884	53.0	−12.3
Ind. Residents	Darren Wise	1,812	51.0	−11.9
Labour	Carole Beth	667	18.8	+2.8
Labour	Krystyna Koseda	613	17.2	+2.3
Labour	Sally Onaiwu	580	16.3	+3.5
Conservative	Tolulope Akinboboye	566	15.9	+2.7
Residents	Daniel Lammin	484	13.6	N/A
Residents	Katy Turner	472	13.3	N/A
Residents	Adela Meer	430	12.1	N/A
Conservative	Ruth Edes	426	12.0	−1.0
Conservative	Godfrey Webster	405	11.4	+0.4
Liberal Democrats	Jonathan Coles	145	4.1	−0.4
Liberal Democrats	Ian Sanderson	99	2.8	N/A
Turnout			35.6%	−1.33
Majority		1,145	32.2	−14.7
Ind. Residents win (new boundaries)				
Ind. Residents win (new boundaries)				
Ind. Residents win (new boundaries)				

== 2002–2022 Havering council elections ==
Harold Wood ward boundaries from 2002 to 2022

There was a revision of ward boundaries in Havering in 2002.

=== 2018 election ===
The election took place on 3 May 2018.

2018 Havering London Borough Council election: Harold Wood
Party	Candidate	Votes	%	±%
Residents	Brian Eagling	2,804	68.7	
Residents	Martin Goode	2,664	65.3	
Residents	Darren Wise	2,566	62.9	
Labour	Christine McGeary	651	16.0	
Labour	Patrick Murray	607	14.9	
Conservative	Michail Koufalitakis	539	13.2	
Conservative	Frederick Thompson	530	13.0	
Labour	Desmond Withrington	522	12.8	
Conservative	Ashok Kumar	448	11.0	
UKIP	Paul Thurtle	252	6.2	
Liberal Democrats	Jonathan Coles	182	4.5	
Turnout			36.93%	
Majority		1,915		
Residents hold		Swing		
Residents hold		Swing		
Residents hold		Swing		

=== 2014 election ===
The election took place on 22 May 2014.

2014 Havering London Borough Council election: Harold Wood
Party	Candidate	Votes	%	±%
Residents	Brian Eagling	2,736		
Residents	Darren Wise	2,294		
Residents	Alex Donald	2,221		
UKIP	John Thurtle	1,140		
Conservative	Lesley Kelly	854		
Conservative	Pamela Light	723		
Conservative	Robert Perry	661		
Labour	Siobhan McGeary	436		
Labour	Michael Hitchin	415		
Labour	Bakary Singhateh	346		
Liberal Democrats	Jonathan Coles	202		
Liberal Democrats	Ian Sanderson	118		
Liberal Democrats	David Williams	82		
TUSC	Chris Rice	62		
Turnout			46	
Residents hold		Swing		
Residents gain from Conservative		Swing		
Residents gain from Conservative		Swing		

=== 2010 election ===
The election on 6 May 2010 took place on the same day as the United Kingdom general election.

2010 Havering London Borough Council election: Harold Wood
Party	Candidate	Votes	%	±%
Residents	Brian Eagling	2,133		
Conservative	Lesley Kelly	1,958		
Conservative	Pamela Light	1,868		
Residents	Darren Wise	1,848		
Residents	Julia Rogers	1,819		
Conservative	John Clark	1,738		
Liberal Democrats	Jonathan Coles	1,347		
Liberal Democrats	Pamela Coles	1,330		
Liberal Democrats	Ian Sanderson	1,074		
Labour	Ken Clark	962		
Labour	Ben Hetchin	848		
Labour	Sean Willis	812		
UKIP	Lawrence Webb	762		
Independent	Cyril Doman	117		
Independent	Cynthia Shellito	62		
Turnout				
Residents gain from Liberal Democrats		Swing		
Conservative hold		Swing		
Conservative hold		Swing		

=== 2006 election ===
The election took place on 4 May 2006.

2006 Havering London Borough Council election: Harold Wood
Party	Candidate	Votes	%	±%
Conservative	Lesley Kelly	1,047	24.7	
Conservative	Pamela Light	1,036		
Liberal Democrats	Jonathan Coles	999	23.6	
Liberal Democrats	Pamela Coles	969		
Residents	Patrick Curtis	968	22.8	
Conservative	Garry Pain	936		
Residents	Ronald Ower	929		
Residents	Richard Harrington	821		
Liberal Democrats	Ian Sanderson	804		
Labour	Bunny Eagling	646	15.2	
Labour	Michael Hitchin	564		
Labour	Darren Wise	525		
National Liberal	David Durant	353	8.3	
National Liberal	Geoffrey Taylor	339		
National Liberal	Nicholas Causton	315		
Green	Maryla Hart	227	5.4	
Turnout			40.7	
Conservative hold		Swing		
Conservative hold		Swing		
Liberal Democrats gain from Conservative		Swing		

=== 2002 election ===
The election took place on 2 May 2002. As an experiment, it was a postal voting election, with the option to hand the papers in on election day.

2002 Havering London Borough Council election: Harold Wood
Party	Candidate	Votes	%	±%
Conservative	Steven Kelly	1,664		
Conservative	Natasha Ratty	1,652		
Conservative	Daryl Williams	1,606		
Labour	Brian Eagling	1,507		
Labour	Caroline Wood	1,466		
Liberal Democrats	Jonathan Coles	1,423		
Labour	Leonard Street	1,354		
Liberal Democrats	Geoffrey Coles	1,300		
Liberal Democrats	Ian Sanderson	1,293		
Turnout				
Conservative win (new boundaries)				
Conservative win (new boundaries)				
Conservative win (new boundaries)				

== 1994–2002 Havering council elections ==
The boundaries of the ward were adjusted on 1 April 1994.

=== 1998 election ===
The election on 7 May 1998 took place on the same day as the 1998 Greater London Authority referendum.

1998 Havering London Borough Council election: Harold Wood
Party	Candidate	Votes	%	±%
Liberal Democrats	Jonathan Coles	1,079		
Labour	Brian Eagling	1,061		
Labour	Caroline Wood	1,054		
Labour	Neil Stanton	999		
Liberal Democrats	Ian Sanderson	947		
Conservative	Keith Taffs	888		
Conservative	Edward Bates	693		
Conservative	Malcolm Brace	679		
Conservative	Georgina Galpin	637		
Residents	Jeffrey Brockelbank	397		
Residents	Patrick Curtis	358		
Residents	Martin Davin	325		
Turnout				
Liberal Democrats hold		Swing		
Labour gain from Liberal Democrats		Swing		
Labour gain from Liberal Democrats		Swing		

=== 1994 election ===
The election took place on 5 May 1994.

1994 Havering London Borough Council election: Harold Wood
Party	Candidate	Votes	%	±%
Liberal Democrats	Jonathan Coles	1,628	41.16	▼5.11
Liberal Democrats	Caroline Hurlstone	1,527		
Liberal Democrats	David Parker-Ross	1,505		
Labour	Keith Darvill	1,222	31.70	▲7.20
Labour	Janet Davis	1,187		
Labour	Jennifer Hague	1,179		
Conservative	Jacqueline Owen	1,123	27.14	▼2.09
Conservative	Keith Wells	998		
Conservative	Anthony Bramwell	950		
Registered electors		8,132		▲123
Turnout		3,883	47.75	▼8.85
Rejected ballots		6	0.15	▲0.08
Liberal Democrats win (new boundaries)				
Liberal Democrats win (new boundaries)				
Liberal Democrats win (new boundaries)				

== 1978–1994 Havering council elections ==
Harold Wood ward boundaries from 1978 to 1994

There was a revision of ward boundaries in Havering in 1978.

=== 1990 election ===
The election took place on 3 May 1990.

1990 Havering London Borough Council election: Harold Wood
Party	Candidate	Votes	%	±%
Lib Dem Focus Team	John Wilson	2,049	46.27	
Lib Dem Focus Team	Mark Wilson	2,041		
Lib Dem Focus Team	Kevyn Jones	1,974		
Conservative	Pamela Light	1,324	29.23	
Conservative	Godfrey Webster	1,260		
Conservative	Marjorie Ramsey	1,247		
Labour	Jennifer Hague	1,095	24.50	
Labour	Dereck Smith	1,064		
Labour	Barry Nottage	1,052		
Registered electors		8,009		
Turnout		4,533	56.60	
Rejected ballots		3	0.07	
Lib Dem Focus Team gain from Conservative		Swing		
Lib Dem Focus Team gain from Conservative		Swing		
Lib Dem Focus Team gain from Conservative		Swing		

=== 1986 election ===
The election took place on 8 May 1986.

1986 Havering London Borough Council election: Harold Wood
Party	Candidate	Votes	%	±%
Conservative	Pamela Light	1,666		
Conservative	Harry Humphrey	1,618		
Conservative	Bob Neill	1,614		
Labour	William Harrison	977		
Labour	Neil Brindley	915		
Labour	Keith Darvill	908		
Alliance	Keith Plant	658		
Alliance	Derek Brown	601		
Alliance	Elaine Dorken	562		
Turnout				
Conservative hold		Swing		
Conservative hold		Swing		
Conservative hold		Swing		

=== 1982 election ===
The election took place on 6 May 1982. Bob Neill was also the Greater London Council member for Romford following the 1985 by-election.

1982 Havering London Borough Council election: Harold Wood
Party	Candidate	Votes	%	±%
Conservative	David Forster	2,117		
Conservative	Bob Neill	2,037		
Conservative	Peter Marsden	1,976		
Alliance	Peter Fowler	799		
Alliance	Ronald Huckstep	755		
Labour	Joseph Moore	654		
Alliance	Graham Bridgeman-Clarke	630		
Labour	Sheila Hills	620		
Labour	Marjorie Ville	602		
Turnout				
Conservative hold		Swing		
Conservative hold		Swing		
Conservative hold		Swing		

=== 1978 election ===
The election took place on 4 May 1978.

1978 Havering London Borough Council election: Harold Wood
Party	Candidate	Votes	%	±%
Conservative	David Forster	2,393		
Conservative	Peter Marsden	2,287		
Conservative	Bob Neill	2,255		
Labour	John McCarthy	1,024		
Labour	Brian Morland	957		
Labour	Hubert Hull	942		
Turnout				
Conservative win (new boundaries)				
Conservative win (new boundaries)				
Conservative win (new boundaries)				

== 1964–1978 Havering council elections ==
External images
- Map showing Harold Wood ward boundaries from 1965 to 1978 (north)
- Map showing Harold Wood ward boundaries from 1965 to 1978 (south)

=== 1974 election ===
The election took place on 2 May 1974.

1974 Havering London Borough Council election: Harold Wood
Party	Candidate	Votes	%	±%
Conservative	David Forster	2,147		
Conservative	Bob Neill	2,130		
Conservative	Peter Marsden	2,093		
Labour	B. Whitworth	1,519		
Labour	Geoffrey Otter	1,497		
Labour	S. Jack	1,434		
Liberal	D. Hart	574		
Liberal	J. Alton	559		
Liberal	P. Hart	543		
Turnout				
Conservative gain from Labour		Swing		
Conservative gain from Labour		Swing		
Conservative gain from Labour		Swing		

=== 1971 election ===
The election took place on 13 May 1971.

1971 Havering London Borough Council election: Harold Wood
Party	Candidate	Votes	%	±%
Labour	T. Ward	1,845		
Labour	R. Whitworth	1,815		
Labour	Geoffrey Otter	1,788		
Conservative	A. Finn	1,684		
Conservative	R. Ramsey	1,676		
Conservative	C. Devlin	1,645		
Ind. Ratepayers	V. Mari	798		
Ind. Ratepayers	D. Warren	793		
Ind. Ratepayers	P. Morgan	763		
Turnout				
Labour gain from Conservative		Swing		
Labour gain from Conservative		Swing		
Labour gain from Conservative		Swing		

=== 1968 election ===
The election took place on 9 May 1968.

1968 Havering London Borough Council election: Harold Wood
Party	Candidate	Votes	%	±%
Conservative	J. Smith	2,789		
Conservative	J. Frost	2,715		
Conservative	D. Owen	2,659		
Labour	D. Edwards	1,005		
Labour	Geoffrey Otter	939		
Labour	R. Smith	818		
Liberal	A. Stubbs	460		
Liberal	M. Chambers	416		
Turnout				
Conservative hold		Swing		
Conservative hold		Swing		
Conservative hold		Swing		

=== 1964 election ===
The election took place on 7 May 1964.

1964 Havering London Borough Council election: Harold Wood
Party	Candidate	Votes	%	±%
Conservative	E. Gallant	1,717		
Conservative	N. Kemble	1,696		
Conservative	J. Smith	1,680		
Labour	Pat Ridley	1,662		
Labour	Ken Weetch	1,650		
Labour	G. Otter	1,629		
Liberal	L. Harris	895		
Liberal	S. Gale	823		
Liberal	B. Potter	807		
Turnout		4,256	50.8	
Conservative win (new seat)				
Conservative win (new seat)				
Conservative win (new seat)				
