= Oldchurch (ward) =

Former electoral ward in the London Borough of Havering

- Former electoral ward for the Havering London Borough Council
- Oldchurch ward boundaries from 1978 to 2002
- Borough: Havering
- County: Greater London

Former electoral ward
- Created: 1965
- Abolished: 2002
- Councillors: 2

Oldchurch was an electoral ward in the London Borough of Havering from 1965 to 2002. The ward was first used in the 1964 elections. It returned councillors to Havering London Borough Council. The name refers to Saint Andrew's Chapel, Romford which was replaced with a church next to the marketplace in 1410.

== 1978–2002 Havering council elections ==
There was a revision of ward boundaries in Havering in 1978.

=== 1998 election ===
The election on 7 May 1998 took place on the same day as the 1998 Greater London Authority referendum.

1998 Havering London Borough Council election: Oldchurch (2)
Party	Candidate	Votes	%	±%
Liberal Democrats	Nigel Meyer	723		
Liberal Democrats	Malcolm Zetter	679		
Labour	Tony Gordon	523		
Labour	Tony Rew	407		
Conservative	Keith Prince	245		
Conservative	Frederick Thompson	210		
Turnout				
Liberal Democrats gain from Labour		Swing		
Liberal Democrats gain from Labour		Swing		

=== 1994 election ===
The election took place on 5 May 1994.

1994 Havering London Borough Council election: Oldchurch (2)
Party	Candidate	Votes	%	±%
Labour	Tony Gordon	1,217	68.28	▲19.32
Labour	Tony Rew	1,121		
Conservative	Jean Curtin	549	31.72	▼1.66
Conservative	Robin Maillard	537		
Registered electors		5,339		▲338
Turnout		1,878	35.18	▼6.61
Rejected ballots		13	0.69	▲0.64
Labour hold		Swing		
Labour hold		Swing		

=== 1990 election ===
The election took place on 3 May 1990.

1990 Havering London Borough Council election: Oldchurch (2)
Party	Candidate	Votes	%	±%
Labour	Tony Gordon	1,110	48.96	
Labour Co-op	Tony Rew	919		
Conservative	Derek Price	735	33.38	
Conservative	Ralph Pritty	649		
Residents	Michael Winter	366	17.66	
Registered electors		5,001		
Turnout		2,090	41.79	
Rejected ballots		1	0.05	
Labour hold		Swing		
Labour Co-op gain from Conservative		Swing		

=== 1986 election ===
The election took place on 8 May 1986.

1986 Havering London Borough Council election: Oldchurch
Party	Candidate	Votes	%	±%
Labour	Tony Rew	624		
Conservative	Derek Price	602		
Labour	Sean Willis	600		
Conservative	Ralph Pritty	579		
Alliance	Nigel Meyer	380		
Alliance	Margaret Lakeman	334		
Green	Kim Smith	53		
Turnout				
Labour gain from Conservative		Swing		
Conservative hold		Swing		

=== 1982 election ===
The election took place on 6 May 1982.

1982 Havering London Borough Council election: Oldchurch
Party	Candidate	Votes	%	±%
Conservative	Derek Price	812		
Conservative	William Todd	787		
Labour	Ronald Baker	513		
Labour	Robert Kilbey	450		
Alliance	Paul Kelly	415		
Alliance	Margaret Snaith	337		
Turnout				
Conservative hold		Swing		
Conservative hold		Swing		

=== 1978 election ===
The election took place on 4 May 1978.

1978 Havering London Borough Council election: Oldchurch
Party	Candidate	Votes	%	±%
Conservative	Derek Price	933		
Conservative	William Todd	932		
Labour	Ronald Baker	770		
Labour	Jocelyn Spindler	668		
National Front	Madeline Caine	90		
National Front	Elsie Harris	82		
Turnout				
Conservative win (new boundaries)				
Conservative win (new boundaries)				

== 1964–1978 Havering council elections ==
=== 1974 election ===
The election took place on 2 May 1974.

1974 Havering London Borough Council election: Oldchurch
Party	Candidate	Votes	%	±%
Labour	Ronald Baker	1,389		
Labour	J. Riley	1,366		
Conservative	S. Swift	837		
Conservative	W. Todd	817		
Turnout				
Labour hold		Swing		
Labour hold		Swing		

=== 1971 election ===
The election took place on 13 May 1971.

1971 Havering London Borough Council election: Oldchurch
Party	Candidate	Votes	%	±%
Labour	Ronald Baker	1,389		
Labour	J. Riley	1,366		
Conservative	S. Swift	837		
Conservative	W. Todd	817		
Turnout				
Labour gain from Conservative		Swing		
Labour gain from Conservative		Swing		

=== 1968 election ===
The election took place on 9 May 1968.

1968 Havering London Borough Council election: Oldchurch
Party	Candidate	Votes	%	±%
Conservative	S. Swift	1,189		
Conservative	W. Todd	1,131		
Labour	Ronald Baker	558		
Labour	T. Ward	540		
Turnout				
Conservative gain from Labour		Swing		
Conservative gain from Labour		Swing		

=== 1964 election ===
The election took place on 7 May 1964.

1964 Havering London Borough Council election: Oldchurch
Party	Candidate	Votes	%	±%
Labour	Ronald Baker	1,022		
Labour	H. Packham	1,004		
Conservative	S. Swift	439		
Conservative	E. McBurnie	426		
Turnout		1,494	25.5	
Labour win (new seat)				
Labour win (new seat)				
