= 2026 Havering London Borough Council election =

- 7 May 2026

All 55 seats on Havering London Borough Council 28 seats needed for a majority
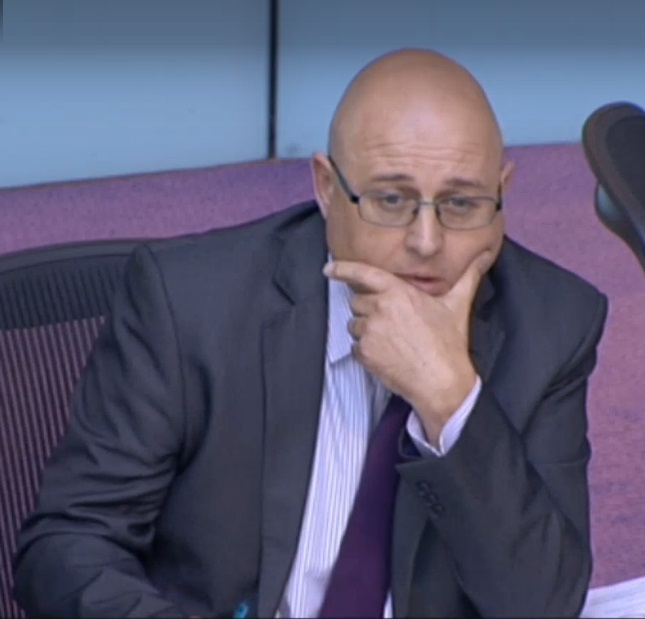
	First party	Second party	Third party
Leader	Keith Prince	Ray Morgon	Darren Wise
Party	Reform	Havering Residents Association	Harold Wood Hill Park RA
Leader's seat	Gooshays	Hacton (did not stand)	Harold Wood
Last election	0 seats, 0.0%	20 seats, 38.4%	3 seats, 3.4%
Seats before	3	25	3
Seats won	39	11	3
Seat change	▲39	▼9	Steady
	Fourth party	Fifth party	Sixth party
Leader	Keith Darvill	Michael White	John Tyler
Party	Labour	Conservative	Ind. Residents
Leader's seat	Heaton (defeated)	Squirrels Heath (defeated)	Cranham
Last election	9 seats, 22.3%	23 seats, 33.1%	0 seats, 0.0%
Seats before	8	14	2
Seats won	2	0	0
Seat change	▼7	▼23	Steady
- Map of the results of the 2026 Havering London Borough Council election. Reform in light blue, Havering Residents Association in dark green, Harold Wood Hill Park Residents Association/East Havering Residents Group in light green and Labour in red.
Council leader before election
Ray Morgon
Havering Residents Association
No overall control
Subsequent council leader
Keith Prince
Reform

The 2026 Havering London Borough Council election took place on 7 May 2026, as part of the 2026 United Kingdom local elections. All 55 members of Havering London Borough Council were elected. The election was held alongside local elections in all other London boroughs.

Prior to the election, the council was under no overall control, with the most seats being held by local party the Havering Residents Association, who ran the council as a minority administration.

The election saw Reform UK take majority control of the council, winning 39 of the 55 seats. They chose Keith Prince to be their new group leader after the election. He was formally appointed as leader of the council at the subsequent annual council meeting on 27 May 2026.

== Background ==
=== History ===
The thirty-two London boroughs were established in 1965 by the London Government Act 1963. They are the principal authorities in Greater London and have responsibilities including education, housing, planning, highways, social services, libraries, recreation, waste, environmental health and revenue collection. Some of the powers are shared with the Greater London Authority, which also manages passenger transport, police and fire.

=== Council term ===
Following the 2022 election, the Conservatives were the largest group on the council but five seats short of a majority. The Havering Residents Association (HRA) entered into a leadership coalition with the Labour Party, with Ray Morgon (HRA, Hacton) as council leader. John Tyler (HRA, Cranham) did not join the HRA group and sat as an independent. The Harold Wood Hill Park Residents Association, who were no longer affiliated with the HRA, formed the three-member East Havering Residents Group. Following the July 2022 Wennington wildfire, in September 2022, Sarah Edwards, Sue Ospreay and Jackie McArdle (all Conservative, Rainham and Wennington) defected to the HRA. The May 2023 death of Linda Hawthorn (HRA, Upminster) led to the 2023 Upminster by-election and the election of Jacqueline Williams (also HRA). In February 2024, Robby Misir (Conservative, Marshalls and Rise Park) joined the HRA and Philip Ruck (HRA, Cranham) left the party to sit as an independent. John Tyler and Philip Ruck then formed the two-member Residents Association Independent Group. In May 2024, John Crowder (Conservative, Havering-atte-Bower), Philippa Crowder (Conservative, Marshalls and Rise Park) and Christine Smith (Conservative, Hylands and Harrow Lodge) joined the HRA. Paul McGeary (Labour, Gooshays) also joined the HRA. The HRA–Labour coalition came to an end in June 2024 and the HRA then formed a minority administration. In July 2024, Jackie McArdle (HRA, Rainham and Wennington) rejoined the Conservatives. In October 2025, Keith Prince (Conservative, Squirrels Heath) defected to Reform UK. Two further councillors defected from the Conservatives to Reform in February 2026.

Key council policies and events since the last election in May 2022 were:

- Response to the 2022 Wennington wildfire
- Climate emergency declaration
- Opposition to the expansion of the Ultra Low Emission Zone
- Approval of the Romford town centre masterplan
- Plans to sell six council car parks to be used for housing
- Temporary modular homes plan approved for the demolished Waterloo estate site
- A tribunal appeal made in 2024 not to publish a diversity report originally produced in 2020, that showed the authority to have normalised sexism and racism, was overturned and the document was published
- A judicial review overturned the 2024 council decision not to record the Launders Lane illegal landfill as contaminated, that would have exempted the council from having to clean it up
- Proposal for a data centre on Metropolitan Green Belt land using a local development order
- New waste and recycling supplier with recycled waste service expanded to include more categories of glass and plastics
- Delay to the start of the weekly food waste collection service past the March 2026 statutory deadline
- £237 million of borrowing from UK government to avoid Section 114 notice. Made up of £32.5 million bailout loan for 2024/25, £88 million for 2025/26 and £77 million for 2026/27.
- Three library branches closed

== Electoral arrangements ==
Ward boundaries established in 2022 will be used for the second time. 55 councillors will be elected from 19 wards. Each ward returns either two or three councillors. Polling will take place on 7 May 2026.

Havering, as is the case for all London borough councils, elects all of its councillors at once every four years, with the previous election having taken place in 2022. The election will take place by multi-member first-past-the-post voting, with each ward being represented by two or three councillors. Electors will have as many votes as there are councillors to be elected in their ward, with the top two or three being elected.

All registered electors (British, Irish, Commonwealth and European Union citizens) living in London aged 18 or over were entitled to vote in the election. People who live at two addresses in different councils, such as university students with different term-time and holiday addresses, are entitled to be registered for and vote in elections in both local authorities. Voting in-person at polling stations will take place from 7:00 to 22:00 on election day, and voters will be able to apply for postal votes or proxy votes in advance of the election.

== Council composition ==
Result of the 2022 borough election

Council composition following the 2022 election

Council composition following the 2026 election

After 2022 election		Before 2026 election		After 2026 election	
Party	Seats	Party	Seats	Party	Seats
Conservative	23	Havering Residents Association	25	Reform	39
Havering Residents Association	20	Conservative	14	Havering Residents Association	11
Labour	9	Labour	8	Harold Wood Hill Park RA	3
Harold Wood Hill Park RA	3	Harold Wood Hill Park RA	3	Labour	2
Ind. Residents	0	Ind. Residents	2	Conservative	0
Reform	0	Reform	3	Ind. Residents	0

== Results summary ==
2026 Havering London Borough Council election
Party	Seats	Gains	Losses	Net gain/loss	Seats %	Votes %	Votes	+/−
Reform	39	39	0	▲39	70.9	37.8	91,840	N/A
Havering Residents Association	11	1	10	▼9	20.0	24.2	58,731	▼14.2
Harold Wood Hill Park RA	3	0	0	Steady	5.5	3.1	7,475	▼0.3
Labour	2	0	7	▼7	3.6	10.0	24,355	▼12.3
Conservative	0	0	23	▼23	0.0	13.7	33,331	▼19.4
Green	0	0	0	Steady	0.0	10.0	24,164	▲8.5
Liberal Democrats	0	0	0	Steady	0.0	1.0	2,427	▲0.1
Independent	0	0	0	Steady	0.0	0.2	495	▼0.1

== Campaign ==
The Romford Conservative Party announced 23 candidates for their part of the borough in March 2025. Seven of those candidates later went on to join Reform UK and stood as candidates for that party. (Note: Robert Benham, Della Morton, Bailey Nash-Gardner, Keith Prince, Maggie Themistocli, Christine Vickery and Tom Vickery were selected as Conservative Party candidates and are now standing for Reform UK.)

== Ward results ==
The results were as follows:

=== Beam Park ===
Beam Park (2)
Party	Candidate	Votes	%	±%
Labour	Trevor McKeever (Note: Councillor for Beam Park since 2022.)	488	21.0	
Labour	Matthew Stanton	473	20.4	
Reform	Alan Harding	449	19.4	
Reform	Jai Rathi	367	15.8	
Havering Residents Association	Rob Baker	330	14.2	
Havering Residents Association	Carol Baker	284	12.3	
Green	Lois Doo	230	9.9	
Green	Tito Mogaji	189	8.2	
Conservative	Azza Mohammed	178	7.7	
Conservative	Michael Braverman	144	6.2	
Liberal Democrats	Haward Anekwe	40	1.7	
Turnout		2,315	32.6	
Labour hold		Swing		
Labour hold		Swing		

=== Cranham ===
Cranham (3)
Party	Candidate	Votes	%	±%
Havering Residents Association	Gillian Ford (Note: Councillor for Cranham since 2002.)	2,844	53.0	−27.5
Havering Residents Association	John Tyler (Note: Councillor for Cranham since 2018.)	2,407	44.9	−27.9
Havering Residents Association	Lesley Tyler	2,184	40.7	−27.6
Reform	Terry Clarke	1,914	35.7	N/A
Reform	Jeff Garnett	1,758	32.8	N/A
Reform	Jarod Tse	1,563	29.1	N/A
Conservative	Jack Hurley	476	8.9	−5.0
Green	Sarah Haider	411	7.7	+0.2
Green	Peter Caton	400	7.5	N/A
Conservative	Baishali Chowdhury	345	6.4	−6.5
Green	Ben Hollis	295	5.5	N/A
Conservative	Sujit Sen	275	5.1	−6.2
Labour	Barbara Bramley	270	5.0	−3.8
Labour	Kate Darvill	255	4.6	−7.0
Labour	Amber Tait	213	4.0	−3.9
Liberal Democrats	Catrin Warden	115	2.1	−1.0
Turnout		5,362	54.49	
Havering Residents Association hold		Swing		
Havering Residents Association hold		Swing		
Havering Residents Association hold		Swing		

=== Elm Park ===
Elm Park (3)
Party	Candidate	Votes	%	±%
Havering Residents Association	Barry Mugglestone (Note: Councillor for Elm Park since 2014.)	2,367		
Havering Residents Association	Stephanie Nunn	2,244		
Havering Residents Association	Kimberley Gould	2,080		
Reform	Wayne Morphew	2,067		
Reform	Joseph Biju	1,868		
Reform	Ash Bhardwaj	1,841		
Green	Kim Arrowsmith	704		
Green	Sami Rahman	563		
Labour	Sidra Bhatti	503		
Labour	Julia Pearman	469		
Labour	Naz Islam	456		
Green	Gheorghe Zugravu	454		
Conservative	Chucks Echedom	405		
Conservative	Bharathi Subramani	355		
Conservative	Matej Travnicek	314		
Liberal Democrats	Graham Potter	110		
Turnout			47.5	
Havering Residents Association hold		Swing		
Havering Residents Association hold		Swing		
Havering Residents Association hold		Swing		

=== Emerson Park ===
Emerson Park (2)
Party	Candidate	Votes	%	±%
Reform	David Johnson	1,306		
Reform	Alex Sibley	1,255		
Havering Residents Association	Stuart Chapell	1,098		
Havering Residents Association	Paul Harrison	1,098		
Conservative	Bernice Robertson	866		
Conservative	Dominic Swan	795		
Labour	Balwinder Khaira	272		
Green	Ghazala Ansari	226		
Labour	Christopher Purnell	222		
Green	Linda Pollard	210		
Liberal Democrats	Jordan Jai	47		
Turnout			52.8	
Reform gain from Havering Residents Association		Swing		
Reform gain from Havering Residents Association		Swing		

=== Gooshays ===
Gooshays (3)
Party	Candidate	Votes	%	±%
Reform	Keith Prince (Note: Councillor for Squirrels Heath since 2018. Stood as a Conservative Party candidate in 2018.)	1,738		
Reform	Liz Tyler	1,711		
Reform	Robert Whitton	1,542		
Havering Residents Association	Paul McGeary (Note: Councillor for Gooshays since 2018. Stood as a Labour Party candidate in 2018 and 2022.)	661		
Labour Co-op	Patricia Brown (Note: Councillor for Gooshays since 2022.)	622		
Havering Residents Association	Ozlem Colak	606		
Havering Residents Association	Louise Newton	606		
Labour Co-op	Sally Omosun	508		
Green	Marissa Jewell	477		
Green	Cenred Elworthy	472		
Labour Co-op	Theo Shaw	471		
Green	Callum Lewis	447		
Conservative	Toyin Ajidele	446		
Conservative	Patrick Marks	362		
Conservative	Dominika Kukielka	322		
Harold Wood Hill Park RA	Martin Glenn	234		
Harold Wood Hill Park RA	Sam Jobber	210		
Harold Wood Hill Park RA	Andrew Wallington	130		
Independent	Philip Hyde	100		
Liberal Democrats	Nigel Meyer	86		
Turnout			35.26	
Reform gain from Labour		Swing		
Reform gain from Labour		Swing		
Reform gain from Labour		Swing		

=== Hacton ===
Hacton (2)
Party	Candidate	Votes	%	±%
Havering Residents Association	Julie Wilkes	1,574		
Reform	Geoff Burgess	1,533		
Havering Residents Association	Reg Whitney (Note: Councillor for Hacton since 2018.)	1,447		
Reform	Mick Slaughter	1,433		
Conservative	Rony Jacob	310		
Conservative	Moses Andishu	287		
Green	Graham Hayfield	238		
Labour	Jonathon Bizzel	210		
Green	Ajay Rayaprolu	201		
Labour	Jeffery Stafford	176		
Liberal Democrats	Colin Savidge	60		
Turnout			51.23	
Havering Residents Association hold		Swing		
Reform gain from Havering Residents Association		Swing		

=== Harold Wood ===
Harold Wood (3)
Party	Candidate	Votes	%	±%
Harold Wood Hill Park RA	Brian Eagling (Note: Councillor for Harold Wood since 2010.)	2,423		
Harold Wood Hill Park RA	Martin Goode	2,269		
Harold Wood Hill Park RA	Darren Wise (Note: Councillor for Harold Wood since 2014.)	2,209		
Reform	Ryan Russel	1,402		
Reform	Kevin Godfrey	1,375		
Reform	Steven Ince	1,375		
Green	Marion Sanders	415		
Green	Anish Kothari	396		
Green	Alex Short	364		
Labour	Jonathan Appiah Bruce	353		
Conservative	Ruth Edes	342		
Conservative	Esme Fay	316		
Conservative	Denise Speight	278		
Labour	Siva Kumar	267		
Labour	Ramkumar Rengarajan	240		
Liberal Democrats	Jonathan Coles	135		
Independent	David Durant (Note: Councillor for Rainham and Wennington from 2010 to 2022. Stood as an Independent Residents Association candidate.)	134		
Liberal Democrats	Ian Sanderson	118		
Turnout			48.19	
Harold Wood Hill Park RA hold		Swing		
Harold Wood Hill Park RA hold		Swing		
Harold Wood Hill Park RA hold		Swing		

=== Havering-atte-Bower ===
Havering-atte-Bower (3)
Party	Candidate	Votes	%	±%
Reform	Graham Edwards	2,419		
Reform	Della Morton	2,329		
Reform	Paul Sullivan	2,297		
Conservative	Jory James	704		
Havering Residents Association	Karen Chesney	686		
Havering Residents Association	Kevin Barrett	664		
Havering Residents Association	John Crowder (Note: Councillor for Havering-atte-Bower since 2022.)	631		
Conservative	Ayo Aladele	602		
Conservative	Mukund Kataria	593		
Green	Alfie Atkinson	564		
Green	Katy Bradbury	557		
Labour	Sunday Aladetoyinbo	551		
Green	Kurt Bowers	505		
Labour	Graham Bramley	501		
Labour	Christopher Pratt	428		
Liberal Democrats	Gren Brown	143		
Turnout			42.1	
Reform gain from Conservative		Swing		
Reform gain from Conservative		Swing		
Reform gain from Conservative		Swing		

=== Heaton ===
Heaton (3)
Party	Candidate	Votes	%	±%
Reform	Kevin Ayres	1,829		
Reform	Iurie Bivol	1,621		
Reform	Amin Khuram	1,588		
Labour Co-op	Keith Darvill (Note: Councillor for Heaton since 2002.)	752		
Labour Co-op	Frankie Walker (Note: Councillor for Heaton since 2022.)	682		
Labour Co-op	Aishwarya Kumar	634		
Havering Residents Association	Rose Dawson	587		
Green	Carole Beth	583		
Havering Residents Association	Nicky Saunter	471		
Green	Aziz Mogaji	470		
Green	Daljit Jutla	461		
Havering Residents Association	Alex Vella	447		
Conservative	James Gallagher	444		
Conservative	Sultana Jahan	333		
Conservative	Kingsley Momodu	303		
Liberal Democrats	Kerrie Sait	124		
Turnout			32.2	
Reform gain from Labour		Swing		
Reform gain from Labour		Swing		
Reform gain from Labour		Swing		

=== Hylands and Harrow Lodge ===
Hylands and Harrow Lodge (3)
Party	Candidate	Votes	%	±%
Reform	Kevin Gill	2,271		
Reform	Sean McMahon	2,212		
Reform	Maggie Themistocli	2,173		
Residents	Jay Belshaw	1,824		
Residents	Christine Smith (Note: Councillor for Hylands and Harrow Lodge since 2022. Stood as a Conservative Party candidate in 2022.)	1,818		
Residents	Ciaran White	1,728		
Conservative	Marco Caporaso	530		
Conservative	Tracey McEvoy	511		
Conservative	Ashley Kissin	498		
Green	Erin Bush	497		
Labour	Pat Farrell	456		
Green	Erin Hickman	432		
Green	Sami Khan	403		
Labour	Susan Jiggens	377		
Labour	David Wood	333		
Liberal Democrats	Wesley Pollard	90		
Turnout			50.31	
Reform gain from Residents		Swing		
Reform gain from Residents		Swing		
Reform gain from Conservative		Swing		

=== Marshalls and Rise Park ===
Marshalls and Rise Park (3)
Party	Candidate	Votes	%	±%
Reform	Robert Benham (Note: Councillor for Rush Green and Crowlands since 2022. Stood as a Conservative Party candidate in 2022.)	2,241		
Reform	Gary Payne	2,135		
Reform	Bailey Nash-Gardner	2,111		
Residents	Philippa Crowder (Note: Councillor for Marshalls and Rise Park since 2022. Stood as a Conservative Party candidate in 2022.)	1103		
Conservative	Lucy Tully	1086		
Conservative	Nisha Patel	984		
Residents	Rob Chesney	975		
Conservative	Janina White	949		
Residents	Robby Misir	873		
Green	Michael Amaning	442		
Labour	Nick Butler	420		
Green	Suzanne Ciechomski	380		
Green	Alex Heslop	379		
Labour	Pauline Dennis	376		
Labour	Anita Pollack	359		
Liberal Democrats	Elliot Kidner	131		
Turnout			51.8	
Reform gain from Conservative		Swing		
Reform gain from Conservative		Swing		
Reform gain from Conservative		Swing		

=== Mawneys ===
Mawneys (3)
Party	Candidate	Votes	%	±%
Reform	Sue Benjamins	1,848		
Reform	Graham Day	1,863		
Reform	Geoff Starns	1,716		
Conservative	Jason Frost (Note: Councillor for Mawneys since 2022.)	1,581		
Conservative	Dilip Patel	1,495		
Conservative	Carol Smith	1,308		
Green	Manon Delaune	497		
Green	Daniel Nichols	479		
Labour	Richard Packer	450		
Labour	Peter Hale	438		
Green	Zack Yurtsever	428		
Residents	Gemma Bevan	360		
Labour	Omid Zadeh	344		
Residents	Rebecca Wilkes	324		
Residents	Bill Lavender	297		
Liberal Democrats	David Proffitt	134		
Turnout			45	
Reform gain from Conservative		Swing		
Reform gain from Conservative		Swing		
Reform gain from Conservative		Swing		

=== Rainham and Wennington ===
Rainham and Wennington (3)
Party	Candidate	Votes	%	±%
Residents	Sue Ospreay (Note: Councillor for Rainham and Wennington since 2022. Stood as a Conservative Party candidate in 2022.)	1,780		
Reform	George Harwin	1,741		
Reform	Joe Lock	1,675		
Residents	Nikki Digby	1,484		
Reform	Justin Halabi	1,443		
Residents	Daniel Beal	1,344		
Labour	Mohammed Abdullah	596		
Labour	Fay Hough	592		
Labour	Sue Watson	534		
Green	Erin Mansfield	323		
Conservative	Sade Adeeko	290		
Green	Leona Munro	257		
Green	Mark Yetton	229		
Conservative	Anamul Hoque	208		
Conservative	Mohammad Sameemuddin	179		
Liberal Democrats	Bogdan Coliba	95		
Turnout			44.97	
Residents gain from Conservative		Swing		
Reform gain from Conservative		Swing		
Reform gain from Conservative		Swing		

=== Rush Green and Crowlands ===
Rush Green and Crowlands (3)
Party	Candidate	Votes	%	±%
Reform	Alex Donald (Note: Councillor for Harold Wood from 2014 to 2018. Stood as a Residents Association candidate.)	1,347		
Reform	Henry William	1,293		
Reform	Petru Dinsorean	1,277		
Conservative	Viddy Persaud (Note: Councillor for Rush Green and Crowlands since 2022.)	1,103		
Conservative	Tim Ryan	1,057		
Conservative	Abul Hussain	1,038		
Labour	John Curtis	810		
Green	Kelly-Louise Edwards	750		
Labour	Joe Jervis	712		
Labour	Tom Pickford	697		
Green	Angelina Leatherbarrow	675		
Green	Beth Winslow	635		
Residents	Tracey Niemierko	269		
Residents	Robert O'Dea	237		
Residents	Garry Pain (Note: Councillor for Hylands from 2014 to 2018. Stood as a Conservative Party candidate.)	228		
Liberal Democrats	Agnius Bogdanovas	128		
Turnout			39.95	
Reform gain from Conservative		Swing		
Reform gain from Conservative		Swing		
Reform gain from Conservative		Swing		

=== South Hornchurch ===
South Hornchurch (2)
Party	Candidate	Votes	%	±%
Reform	Luke Barry	1,307		
Reform	Angelica Ola	1,151		
Residents	Graham Williamson (Note: Councillor for South Hornchurch since 2014.)	851		
Residents	Natasha Summers (Note: Councillor for South Hornchurch since 2018.)	806		
Labour	Karen Bernard	433		
Green	Ruth Kettle-Frisby	316		
Labour	Eric Sheqi	310		
Independent	Mushtaq Ahmad	261		
Green	Henry Mcaneny	243		
Conservative	Michael Burton	230		
Conservative	Arunraj Swlvaraj	161		
Liberal Democrats	Caroline Hibbs-Brown	66		
Turnout			42.62	
Reform gain from Residents		Swing		
Reform gain from Residents		Swing		

=== Squirrels Heath ===
Squirrels Heath (3)
Party	Candidate	Votes	%	±%
Reform	Christine Vickery (Note: Councillor for Squirrels Heath since 2022. Stood as a Conservative Party candidate in 2022.)	2,330	40.1	N/A
Reform	Tom Vickery	2,255	38.1	N/A
Reform	Martynas Cekavicius	2,159	37.1	N/A
Conservative	Adam Baker	1,432	24.6	−29.8
Conservative	Michael White (Note: Councillor for Squirrels Heath since 2002.)	1,357	23.4	−29.8
Conservative	Spencer Seaton	1,306	22.5	−29.9
Green	Mark Whiley	851	14.6	N/A
Green	Madhu Devershetty	847	14.6	N/A
Green	Richard Killip	815	14.0	N/A
Residents	Paul Highman	620	10.7	−15.2
Residents	Jordan Beal	609	10.5	−11.4
Residents	Bob Perry	552	9.5	−11.0
Labour	Nadia Abid	550	9.5	−10.4
Labour	Alison Cummerson	509	8.8	−8.1
Labour	Antonia Osammor	432	7.4	−8.9
Liberal Democrats	Thomas Clarke	226	3.9	−1.5
Liberal Democrats	Shane Forster	166	2.9	−1.3
Turnout		5,581	49.78	+11.24
Reform gain from Conservative		Swing	N/A	
Reform gain from Conservative		Swing	N/A	
Reform gain from Conservative		Swing	N/A	

=== St Alban's ===
St Alban's (2)
Party	Candidate	Votes	%	±%
Reform	Diane Smith	764	31.39	
Reform	Russell Smith	748	30.73	
Labour	Jane Keane (Note: Councillor for St Alban's since 2022.)	681	27.98	
Labour	Jack Dobson-Smith	578	23.75	
Conservative	Judith Holt	532	21.86	
Conservative	Martin Firmstone	427	17.54	
Green	Laurence Solkin	308	12.65	
Residents	Tamim Ahmed	235	9.65	
Green	Arian Wahab	230	9.45	
Residents	Nicolas Kee Mew	207	8.50	
Liberal Democrats	Owen Roberts	61	2.51	
Turnout			43.95	
Reform gain from Conservative		Swing		
Reform gain from Labour		Swing		

=== St Andrew's ===
St Andrew's (3)
Party	Candidate	Votes	%	±%
Reform	Robert Attree	2,274		
Reform	Malvin Brown (Note: Councillor for South Hornchurch from 2002 to 2006. Stood as a Residents Association candidate in 2002.)	2,209		
Reform	George Cowie	2,098		
Residents	Bryan Vincent (Note: Councillor for St Andrew's since 2022.)	1,995		
Residents	John Cain	1,957		
Residents	John Wood	1,906		
Conservative	Henry Frost	585		
Green	Keira Gomez	514		
Green	Tia Lancaster	467		
Conservative	Anil Gupta	446		
Green	Felix Katzenmaier	441		
Conservative	Izu Nwafor	397		
Labour	Brendan Pridmore	343		
Labour	Keith Taffs	341		
Labour	Hamida Idris	334		
Liberal Democrats	Daniels Daudiss	120		
Turnout			50.5	
Reform gain from Residents		Swing		
Reform gain from Residents		Swing		
Reform gain from Residents		Swing		

=== St Edward's ===
St Edward's (3)
Party	Candidate	Votes	%	±%
Reform	Terry Brown	1,108		
Reform	Martin Lardner	1,075		
Reform	Sathya Maddasani	965		
Conservative	Wendy Brice-Thompson	732		
Conservative	Roy Chowdhury	680		
Conservative	Svetlana Joao	568		
Green	Alexandra Betkowska	552		
Labour	Emma Hawkins	547		
Green	Scott Donovan	494		
Labour	Alex Navarro-James	453		
Labour	Pushpa Makwana	452		
Green	Kieron Thomson-Turnage	424		
Residents	Dianne Thomson	411		
Residents	Jody Ganly	359		
Residents	Nuno Justo	319		
Liberal Democrats	Tej Singh	120		
Turnout			42.32	
Reform gain from Conservative		Swing		
Reform gain from Conservative		Swing		
Reform gain from Conservative		Swing		

=== Upminster ===
Upminster (3)
Party	Candidate	Votes	%	±%
Residents	Oscar Ford (Note: Councillor for Upminster since 2022.)	2,770		
Residents	Michael Fisher	2,633		
Residents	Christopher Wilkins (Note: Councillor for Upminster since 2018.)	2,541		
Reform	Leslie Montague-Nahla	1,950		
Reform	Sam Tiwari	1,824		
Reform	Mahbub Rahman	1,697		
Conservative	Christopher Nicholls	647		
Conservative	Ian de Wulverton	627		
Conservative	Oliver Rose	592		
Green	Noel Richardson	394		
Green	Rowan Elworthy	342		
Labour	Simon Darvill	334		
Labour	Patrick Chalk	308		
Green	Riley Rogers	288		
Labour	Keane Handley	240		
Liberal Democrats	Jessica Townsend	112		
Turnout			56.4	
Residents hold		Swing		
Residents hold		Swing		
Residents hold		Swing		
