= Havering-atte-Bower (ward) =

- Electoral ward for the Havering London Borough Council
- Havering-atte-Bower ward boundaries since 2022
- Borough: Havering
- County: Greater London
- Population: 16,374 (2021) (Note: 2021 Census data reported for 2022 ward boundaries)
- Electorate: 11,538 (2022)
- Major settlements: Collier Row, Havering-atte-Bower
- Area: 10.17 square kilometres (3.93 sq mi)

Current electoral ward
- Created: 2022
- Number of members: 3
- Councillors: Graham Edwards; Della Morton; Paul Sullivan
- Created from: Gooshays, Havering Park, Heaton and Mawneys
- GSS code: E05013974

Havering-atte-Bower is an electoral ward in the London Borough of Havering. The ward was first used in the 2022 elections. It returns three councillors to Havering London Borough Council.

== List of councillors ==
Term	Councillor	Party
2022–2026	Raymond Best	Conservative
2022–2026	John Crowder (Note: John Crowder changed parties in 2024)	Conservative
2022–2026	John Crowder	Residents
2022–2026	Damian White	Conservative

== Summary ==
Councillors elected by party at each general borough election.

- Conservatives
- Reform

== Havering council elections ==
=== 2026 election ===
The election took place on 7 May 2026.

2026 Havering London Borough Council election: Havering-atte-Bower (3)
Party	Candidate	Votes	%	±%
Reform	Graham Edwards	2,419		
Reform	Della Morton	2,329		
Reform	Paul Sullivan	2,297		
Conservative	Jory James	704		
Havering Residents Association	Karen Chesney	686		
Havering Residents Association	Kevin Barrett	664		
Havering Residents Association	John Crowder	631		
Conservative	Ayo Aladele	602		
Conservative	Mukund Kataria	593		
Green	Alfie Atkinson	564		
Green	Katy Bradbury	557		
Labour	Sunday Aladetoyinbo	551		
Green	Kurt Bowers	505		
Labour	Graham Bramley	501		
Labour	Christopher Pratt	428		
Liberal Democrats	Gren Brown	143		
Turnout			42.1	
Reform gain from Conservative		Swing		
Reform gain from Conservative		Swing		
Reform gain from Conservative		Swing		

=== 2022 election ===
The election took place on 5 May 2022.

2022 Havering London Borough Council election: Havering-atte-Bower (3)
Party	Candidate	Votes	%	±%
Conservative	Raymond Best	1,703	58.0	
Conservative	John Crowder	1,663	56.7	
Conservative	Damian White	1,504	51.2	
Residents	Carol Perry	1,157	39.4	
Labour	Sanchia Alasia	1,008	34.4	
Labour	Benedicta Lashley	977	33.3	
Labour	Taimaz Ranjbaran	790	26.9	
Turnout			29.16	
Majority		347	11.8	
Conservative win (new seat)				
Conservative win (new seat)				
Conservative win (new seat)				
