= St Andrew's (Havering ward) =

Electoral ward in the London borough of Havering

- Electoral ward for the Havering London Borough Council
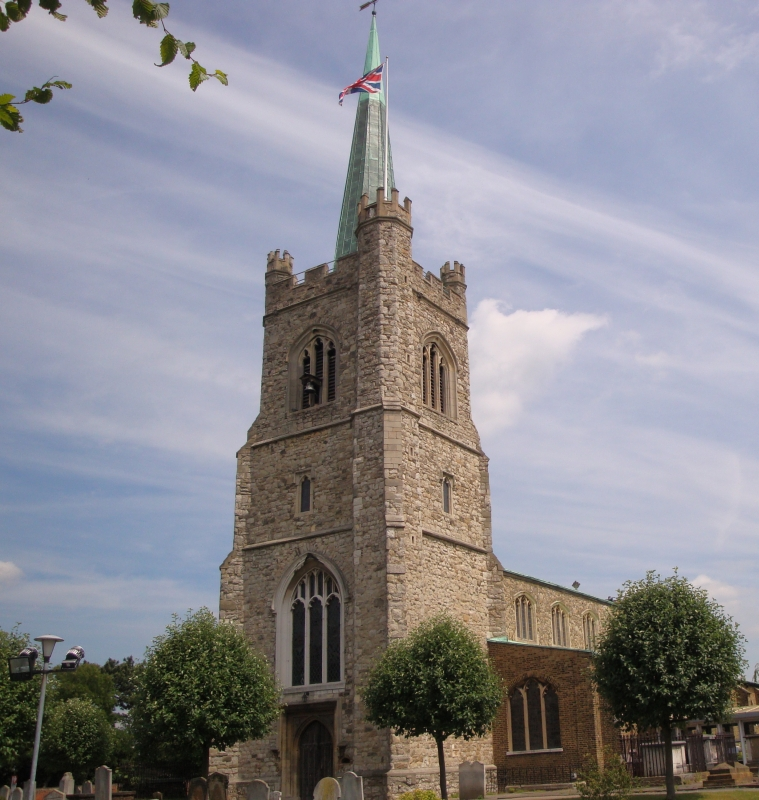
- The ward is named for St Andrew's Church
- St Andrew's ward boundaries since 2022
- Borough: Havering
- County: Greater London
- Population: 14,654 (2021) (Note: 2021 Census data reported for 2022 ward boundaries)
- Major settlements: Hornchurch
- Area: 2.904 square kilometres (1.121 sq mi)

Current electoral ward
- Created: 1965
- Number of members: 3
- Councillors: Robert Attree; Malvin Brown; George Cowie
- GSS code: E05013982 (2022–present)

St Andrew's is an electoral ward in the London Borough of Havering. The ward has existed since the creation of the borough on 1 April 1965 and was first used in the 1964 elections. It returns three councillors to Havering London Borough Council.

The ward covers Hornchurch town centre and adjacent residential areas. The ward was dominated by the Conservative Party at the first eight elections. Since 1994, the Hornchurch Residents Association has been the most successful party to stand candidates.

The ward is named for St Andrew's Church, Hornchurch.

== List of councillors ==
Term	Councillor	Party
1964–1968	Sidney Legg	Conservative
1964–1968	J. Macy	Conservative
1964–1990	Albert James	Conservative
1968–1978	Edward Hoad	Conservative
1968–1974	D. Peters	Conservative
1974–1978	David Biddlecombe	Conservative
1978–1994	Thomas Orrin	Conservative
1978–1990	Arthur Cotier	Conservative
1990–1994	Dennis Bull	Conservative
1990–1994	Pauline Orrin	Conservative
1994–2022	John Mylod (Note: John Mylod changed parties in 2018)	Residents
1994–2022	John Mylod	Conservative
1994–2006	Christopher Oliver	Residents
1994–1998	Graham Carr	Labour
1998–2006	Michael Winter	Residents
2007–2010	Michael Winter	Residents
2006–2007	Brenda Riddle	Residents
2006–2009	David Charles	Conservative
2009–2018	John Wood	Residents
2010–2014	Garry Pain	Conservative
2014–2018	Reginald Whitney	Residents
2018–2026	Paul Middleton	Residents
2018–2026	Gerry O'Sullivan	Residents
2022–2026	Bryan Vincent	Residents
2026–present	Robert Attree	Reform
2026–present	Malvin Brown	Reform
2026–present	George Cowie	Reform

== Summary ==
Councillors elected by party at each general borough election.

- Conservative
- Residents
- Labour
- Reform

== Havering council elections since 2022 ==
St Andrew's ward boundaries since 2022

There was a revision of ward boundaries in Havering in 2022. The ward is bounded by the Romford-Upminster London Overground line to the north, The Ravensbourne and part of Abbs Cross Lane to the west, the District line of the London Underground to the south and the River Ingrebourne to the east. It includes Hornchurch town centre and the residential areas immediately to the north and south of it. Hornchurch tube station is on the boundary to the south and Upminster Bridge tube station is brought into the ward including the residential streets immediately to the south. The small section of northeastern Elm Park was removed from the ward.

=== 2026 election ===
The election took place on 7 May 2026.

2026 Havering London Borough Council election: St Andrew's
Party	Candidate	Votes	%	±%
Reform	Robert Attree	2,274		
Reform	Malvin Brown (Note: Councillor for South Hornchurch from 2002 to 2006. Stood as a Residents Association candidate in 2002.)	2,209		
Reform	George Cowie	2,098		
Residents	Bryan Vincent	1,995		
Residents	John Cain	1,957		
Residents	John Wood	1,906		
Conservative	Henry Frost	585		
Green	Keira Gomez	514		
Green	Tia Lancaster	467		
Conservative	Anil Gupta	446		
Green	Felix Katzenmaier	441		
Conservative	Izu Nwafor	397		
Labour	Brendan Pridmore	343		
Labour	Keith Taffs	341		
Labour	Hamida Idris	334		
Liberal Democrats	Daniels Daudiss	120		
Turnout			50.5	
Reform gain from Residents		Swing		
Reform gain from Residents		Swing		
Reform gain from Residents		Swing		

=== 2022 election ===
The election took place on 5 May 2022.

2022 Havering London Borough Council election: St Andrew's
Party	Candidate	Votes	%	±%
Residents	Paul Middleton	2,855		
Residents	Gerry O'Sullivan	2,823		
Residents	Bryan Vincent	2,700		
Conservative	Henry Frost	747		
Conservative	John Mylod	735		
Conservative	Oliver Rose	702		
Labour	Nicholas Butler	624		
Labour	Joseph Jervis	534		
Labour	Abdal Miah	471		
Green	Martin Davis	295		
Turnout				
Residents win (new boundaries)				
Residents win (new boundaries)				
Residents win (new boundaries)				

== 2002–2022 Havering council elections ==
St Andrew's ward boundaries between 2002 and 2022

There was a revision of ward boundaries in Havering in 2002. The St Andrew's ward occupied a triangle of land between the Romford to Upminster Line in the north to the District line in the south, and from the River Ingrebourne in the east to Harrow Lodge Park in the west. It included central Hornchurch and parts of the Elm Park and Upminster Bridge areas. From 6 May 2010 the ward formed part of the Hornchurch and Upminster UK Parliament constituency.

=== 2018 election ===
The election took place on 3 May 2018.

2018 Havering London Borough Council election: St Andrew's
Party	Candidate	Votes	%	±%
Residents	Paul Middleton	1,738		
Residents	Gerry O'Sullivan	1,705		
Conservative	John Mylod	1,626		
Residents	Bryan Vincent	1,601		
Conservative	Christopher Sutton	1,491		
Conservative	Richard Rimkus	1,438		
Labour	Janet Davis	709		
Labour	Jeffery Stafford	576		
Labour	Keith Taffs	546		
UKIP	Malvin Brown	369		
Green	Danuta Gorzynska-Hart	248		
BNP	Denise Underwood	123		
Liberal Democrats	David Williams	119		
Turnout				
Residents hold		Swing		
Residents hold		Swing		
Conservative gain from Residents		Swing		

=== 2014 election ===
The election took place on 22 May 2014.

2014 Havering London Borough Council election: St Andrew's
Party	Candidate	Votes	%	±%
Residents	John Wood	1,906		
Residents	John Mylod	1,894		
Residents	Reginald Whitney	1,572		
UKIP	Julian Clark	1,570		
Conservative	Malcolm Brace	976		
Conservative	Georgina Galpin	927		
Conservative	Edward Sepple	867		
Labour	Georgina Carr	575		
Labour	Barbara Bramley	568		
Labour	Keith Taffs	462		
Green	Danuta Gorzynska-Hart	312		
Liberal Democrats	Geoffrey Coles	81		
National Liberal	Graham Davidson	50		
National Liberal	Graham Littlechild	43		
National Liberal	Madelaine Marsden	32		
Turnout				
Residents gain from Conservative		Swing		
Residents hold		Swing		
Residents hold		Swing		

=== 2010 election ===
For the election on 6 May 2010, which took place on the same day as the United Kingdom general election, the turnout was 68.8%. Two Hornchurch Residents Association members and one Conservative Party member were elected.

2010 Havering London Borough Council election: St Andrew's
Party	Candidate	Votes	%	±%
Conservative	Garry Pain	2,397		
Residents	John Mylod	2,394		
Residents	John Wood	2,370		
Conservative	Robert Perry	2,342		
Residents	Michael Winter	2,264		
Conservative	Gloria Passannante	1,977		
Labour	Georgina Carr	1,088		
Labour	Graham Bramley	1,032		
Labour	Janet Davis	997		
UKIP	Gregory Mangham	881		
Liberal Democrats	Peter Spence	636		
Liberal Democrats	Geoffrey Coles	609		
Liberal Democrats	Keith Taffs	493		
Green	Danuta Gorzynska-Hart	357		
Independent	Leonard Swallow	122		
Independent	Frederick Jerrett	119		
Turnout				
Conservative gain from Residents		Swing		
Residents gain from Conservative		Swing		
Residents hold		Swing		

=== 2009 by-election ===
The by-election took place on 4 June 2009, following the resignation of David Charles of the Conservative Party. John Wood of the Hornchurch Residents Association was elected.

2009 St Andrew's by-election
Party	Candidate	Votes	%	±%
Residents	John Wood	1,413	32.0	
Conservative	Garry Pain	891	20.2	
BNP	Michael Joyce	771	17.5	
Labour	Graham Carr	455	10.3	
Say No to European Union	Lawrence Webb	433	9.8	
National Liberal	David Durant	291	6.6	
Liberal Democrats	Keith Taffs	159	3.6	
Turnout				
Residents gain from Conservative		Swing		

=== 2007 by-election ===
The by-election took place on 14 June 2007, following the resignation of Brenda Riddle of the Hornchurch Residents Association. Michael Winter of the Hornchurch Residents Association was elected.

2007 St Andrew's by-election
Party	Candidate	Votes	%	±%
Residents	Michael Winter	993		
Conservative	Gary Murphy	583		
BNP	Mark Logan	580		
Labour	Bryan Vincent	511		
National Liberal	David Durant	184		
UKIP	Lawrence Webb	169		
Liberal Democrats	Angela Kawa	80		
Turnout				
Residents hold		Swing		

=== 2006 election ===
For the election on 4 May 2006 the turnout was 40.8%. Two Hornchurch Residents Association members and one Conservative Party member were elected.

2006 Havering London Borough Council election: St Andrew's
Party	Candidate	Votes	%	±%
Residents	John Mylod	1,585		
Conservative	David Charles	1,535		
Residents	Brenda Riddle	1,527		
Conservative	Christopher Ryan	1,462		
Conservative	Gloria Passannante	1,388		
Residents	Michael Winter	1,379		
Labour	Georgina Carr	703		
Labour	Michael Davis	616		
Labour	Bryan Vincent	613		
Independent	Mark Logan	324		
Independent	Kevin Jones	304		
National Liberal	John Coles	300		
Turnout				
Residents hold		Swing		
Conservative gain from Residents		Swing		
Residents hold		Swing		

=== 2002 election ===
For the election on 2 May 2002 the turnout was 38.3%. As an experiment, it was a postal voting election, with the option to hand the papers in on election day. Three Hornchurch Residents Association members were elected.

2002 Havering London Borough Council election: St Andrew's
Party	Candidate	Votes	%	±%
Residents	Christopher Oliver	2,069		
Residents	John Mylod	1,966		
Residents	Michael Winter	1,814		
Conservative	Carol Roberts	1,302		
Conservative	Robert Binion	1,115		
Labour	Terence Matthew	1,085		
Conservative	Jean Cockling	1,072		
Labour	Bryan Vincent	1,058		
Labour	Alan Scott	1,006		
UKIP	Terry Murray	232		
UKIP	Terry Murray	224		
National Liberal	Joseph Guiver	205		
UKIP	Lawrence Webb	204		
Turnout				
Residents win (new boundaries)				
Residents win (new boundaries)				
Residents win (new boundaries)				

== 1978–2002 Havering council elections ==
St Andrew's ward boundaries between 1978 and 2002

There was a revision of ward boundaries in Havering in 1978.

From 1979 the ward was part of the London East constituency for elections to the European Parliament and from 1999 to 2020 the London constituency.

=== 1998 election ===
The election on 7 May 1998 took place on the same day as the 1998 Greater London Authority referendum.

1998 Havering London Borough Council election: St Andrew's
Party	Candidate	Votes	%	±%
Residents	Christopher Oliver	1,423		
Residents	John Mylod	1,416		
Residents	Michael Winter	1,272		
Labour	Georgina Carr	960		
Labour	Graham Carr	948		
Labour	Terence Matthews	893		
Conservative	Pauline Orrin	711		
Conservative	Thomas Orrin	703		
Conservative	Richard Strauss	657		
Turnout				
Residents hold		Swing		
Residents hold		Swing		
Residents gain from Labour		Swing		

=== 1994 election ===
The election took place on 5 May 1994.

1994 Havering London Borough Council election: St Andrew's
Party	Candidate	Votes	%	±%
Residents	John Mylod	1,349		
Residents	Christopher Oliver	1,323		
Labour	Graham Carr	1,318		
Labour	Georgina Carr	1,313		
Labour	Benjamin Norwin	1,234		
Residents	Michael Winter	1,199		
Conservative	Dennis Bull	1,033		
Conservative	Pauline Orrin	1,000		
Conservative	Thomas Orrin	976		
Residents	Terence Matthews	331		
Residents	Cynthia Matthews	326		
Residents	Graham Watkins	280		
Turnout				
Residents gain from Conservative		Swing		
Residents gain from Conservative		Swing		
Labour gain from Conservative		Swing		

=== 1990 election ===
The election took place on 3 May 1990.

1990 Havering London Borough Council election: St Andrew's
Party	Candidate	Votes	%	±%
Conservative	Dennis Bull	1,555		
Conservative	Pauline Orrin	1,459		
Conservative	Thomas Orrin	1,440		
Residents	Cynthia Matthews	1,328		
Residents	Ian Grimble	1,320		
Labour	Georgina Carr	1,294		
Residents	Graham Watkins	1,276		
Labour	Keith Dutton	1,254		
Labour	Benjamin Norwin	1,184		
Turnout				
Conservative hold		Swing		
Conservative hold		Swing		
Conservative hold		Swing		

=== 1986 election ===
The election took place on 8 May 1986.

1986 Havering London Borough Council election: St Andrew's
Party	Candidate	Votes	%	±%
Conservative	Arthur Cotier	1,421		
Conservative	Albert James	1,376		
Conservative	Thomas Orrin	1,368		
Residents	Barbara Farrant	968		
Residents	Graham Watkins	930		
Residents	Stephen Whittaker	865		
Labour	Keith Dutton	762		
Labour	Margaret Hoepelman	721		
Alliance	Adrienne McCarthy	700		
Labour	Robert Kirchner	691		
Alliance	Brian McCarthy	672		
Alliance	Trevor Wood	613		
Green	Teresa Price	71		
Turnout				
Conservative hold		Swing		
Conservative hold		Swing		
Conservative hold		Swing		

=== 1982 election ===
The election took place on 6 May 1982.

1982 Havering London Borough Council election: St Andrew's
Party	Candidate	Votes	%	±%
Conservative	Arthur Cotier	1,960		
Conservative	Albert James	1,951		
Conservative	Thomas Orrin	1,801		
Alliance	Adrienne McCarthy	1,099		
Alliance	Martin Heazell	1,018		
Residents	Patrick Phelps	963		
Alliance	Trevor Wood	936		
Labour	Keith Dutton	625		
Labour	Margaret Jack	555		
Labour	Margaret Hoepelman	530		
Turnout				
Conservative hold		Swing		
Conservative hold		Swing		
Conservative hold		Swing		

=== 1978 by-election ===
The by-election took place on 14 September 1978, following the death of David Biddlecombe.

1978 St Andrew's by-election
Party	Candidate	Votes	%	±%
Conservative	Arthur Cotier	1,195		
Ind. Ratepayers	Angela Meads	659		
Labour	George Saunders	593		
Liberal	Adrienne McCarthy	126		
Turnout				
Conservative hold		Swing		

=== 1978 election ===
For the election on 4 May 1978 the electorate was 9,027 and turnout was 44%.

1978 Havering London Borough Council election: St Andrew's
Party	Candidate	Votes	%	±%
Conservative	Albert James	2,063		
Conservative	David Biddlecombe	1,998		
Conservative	Thomas Orrin	2,012		
Labour	Keith Dutton	906		
Labour	Margaret Hoepelman	850		
Labour	Margaret Jack	844		
Ind. Residents	Frank Everett	720		
Ind. Residents	Angela Meads	711		
Ind. Residents	Herbert Borley	169		
Liberal	John Green	169		
Liberal	Adrienne McCarthy	158		
Liberal	Trevor Wood	142		
Turnout				
Conservative win (new boundaries)				
Conservative win (new boundaries)				
Conservative win (new boundaries)				

== 1964–1978 Havering council elections ==
External image
- Map showing St Andrew's ward boundaries from 1965 to 1978

St Andrew's ward has existed since the creation of the London Borough of Havering on 1 April 1965. For elections to Westminster it was part of the Hornchurch constituency and for elections to the Greater London Council it was part of the Havering electoral division from 1965 and then the Hornchurch electoral division from 1973.

=== 1974 election ===
For the 2 May 1974 election the electorate was 9,436 and there was a turnout of 42.5%. Three Conservative Party members were elected. The councillors were elected for a four-year term at this and subsequent elections.

1974 Havering London Borough Council election: St Andrew's
Party	Candidate	Votes	%	±%
Conservative	David Biddlecombe	1,487		
Conservative	Albert James	1,448		
Conservative	Edward Hoad	1,445		
Labour	B. Taylor	1,136		
Labour	W. Russell	1,112		
Labour	B. Baker	1,096		
Residents	J. Woollard	1,079		
Residents	G. Lewis	1,068		
Residents	H. Stubbles	1,065		
Liberal	B. Grant	242		
Liberal	T. Rimmer	231		
Liberal	T. Wood	219		
Turnout				
Conservative hold		Swing		
Conservative hold		Swing		
Conservative hold		Swing		

=== 1971 election ===
For the 13 May 1971 election the electorate was 9,441 and there was a turnout of 42.7%. Three Conservative Party members were elected. The councillors were elected for a three-year term.

1971 Havering London Borough Council election: St Andrew's
Party	Candidate	Votes	%	±%
Conservative	Albert James	1,685		
Conservative	Edward Hoad	1,653		
Conservative	D. Peters	1,622		
Labour	K. Ince	1566		
Labour	M. Rudlin	1516		
Labour	B. Carroll	1501		
Ind. Ratepayers	M. Gay	575		
Ind. Ratepayers	P. Littlechild	545		
Ind. Ratepayers	A. Wright	529		
Liberal	B. Grant	174		
Liberal	T. Rimmer	170		
Liberal	W. Wallace	170		
Turnout				
Conservative hold		Swing		
Conservative hold		Swing		
Conservative hold		Swing		

=== 1968 by-election ===
On 27 June 1968 there was a by-election. Turnout was 27.7%. The by-election followed Sidney Legg becoming an alderman on the council.

1968 St Andrew's by-election
Party	Candidate	Votes	%	±%
Conservative	D. Peters	1,258		
Ind. Ratepayers	Thomas Dix	668		
Labour	G. Saunders	279		
Liberal	B. Grant	141		
Turnout				
Conservative hold		Swing		

=== 1968 election ===
At the 9 May 1968 election the electorate was 8,479 and three Conservative Party councillors were elected. Turnout was 45.1%. The councillors were elected for a three-year term.

1968 Havering London Borough Council election: St Andrew's
Party	Candidate	Votes	%	±%
Conservative	Sidney Legg	2,716		
Conservative	Edward Hoad	2,685		
Conservative	Albert James	2,609		
Liberal	B. Grant	544		
Liberal	M. Reeve	542		
Liberal	T. Rimmer	531		
Labour	G. Dodge	481		
Labour	G. Saunders	477		
Labour	D. Ramstead	462		
Turnout				
Conservative hold		Swing		
Conservative hold		Swing		
Conservative hold		Swing		

=== 1964 election ===
It was first used in the 1964 election to Havering London Borough Council, with an electorate of 8,695 returning three councillors. On 7 May 1964 election there was a turnout of 47.2%. The councillors did not formally take up office until 1 April 1965, for a three-year term.

1964 Havering London Borough Council election: St Andrew's
Party	Candidate	Votes	%	±%
Conservative	Sidney Legg	2,008		
Conservative	J. Macy	1,962		
Conservative	Albert James	1,933		
Labour	May Rudlin	1,453		
Labour	A. Winch	1,444		
Labour	H. Moss	1,436		
Liberal	T. Rimmer	643		
Liberal	R. Journet	633		
Liberal	G. Elliott	591		
Turnout				
Conservative win (new seat)				
Conservative win (new seat)				
Conservative win (new seat)				
