= St Alban's (ward) =

- Electoral ward for the Havering London Borough Council
- St Alban's ward boundaries since 2022
- Borough: Havering
- County: Greater London
- Population: 8,737 (2021) (Note: 2021 Census data reported for 2022 ward boundaries)
- Electorate: 5,518 (2022)
- Major settlements: Romford
- Area: 1.240 square kilometres (0.479 sq mi)

Current electoral ward
- Created: 2022
- Number of members: 2
- Councillors: Russel Smith; Diane Smith
- GSS code: E05013981

St Alban's is an electoral ward in the London Borough of Havering. The ward was first used in the 2022 elections. It returns two councillors to Havering London Borough Council.

== List of councillors ==
Term	Councillor	Party
2022–2026	Judith Holt	Conservative
2022–2026	Jane Keane	Labour
2026–present	Diane Smith	Reform
2026–present	Russell Smith	Reform

== Summary ==
Councillors elected by party at each general borough election.

- Conservative
- Labour
- Reform

== Havering council elections ==
=== 2026 election ===
The election took place on 7 May 2026.

2026 Havering London Borough Council election: St Alban's (2)
Party	Candidate	Votes	%	±%
Reform	Diane Smith	764	31.39	
Reform	Russell Smith	748	30.73	
Labour	Jane Keane	681	27.98	
Labour	Jack Dobson-Smith	578	23.75	
Conservative	Judith Holt	532	21.86	
Conservative	Martin Firmstone	427	17.54	
Green	Laurence Solkin	308	12.65	
Residents	Tamim Ahmed	235	9.65	
Green	Arian Wahab	230	9.45	
Residents	Nicolas Kee Mew	207	8.50	
Liberal Democrats	Owen Roberts	61	2.51	
Turnout			43.95	
Reform gain from Conservative		Swing		
Reform gain from Labour		Swing		

=== 2022 election ===
The election took place on 5 May 2022.

2022 Havering London Borough Council election: St Alban's (2)
Party	Candidate	Votes	%	±%
Conservative	Judith Holt	939	47.3	N/A
Labour	Jane Keane	852	42.9	N/A
Conservative	Aaron Young	844	42.5	N/A
Labour	Hope Mendy	798	40.2	N/A
Residents	Kimberley Gould	295	14.9	N/A
Residents	Ian Swann	240	12.1	N/A
Turnout			36.84%	N/A
Majority		8	0.4	N/A
Conservative win (new seat)				
Labour win (new seat)				
