= Gidea Park (ward) =

Electoral ward in Havering, London

- Former electoral ward for the Havering London Borough Council
- Gidea Park ward boundaries from 1978 to 2002
- Borough: Havering
- County: Greater London

Former electoral ward
- Created: 1978
- Abolished: 2002
- Councillors: 2

Gidea Park was an electoral ward in the London Borough of Havering from 1965 to 2002. The ward was first used in the 1964 elections. It returned two councillors to Havering London Borough Council.

== List of councillors ==
Term	Councillor	Party
1964–1968	G. Johnson	Conservative
1964–1968	John Whale	Conservative
1968	R. Clark	Conservative
1968–1982	John Johnston	Conservative
1968–1971	S. New	Conservative
1971–1974	N. Kemble	Conservative
1974–1992	Alice Smith	Conservative
1982–1988	David Cure	Conservative
1988–1990	David Forster	Conservative
1990–1994	Keith Prince	Conservative
1992–1994	Marjorie Ramsey	Conservative
1994–2002	Ian Wilkes	Residents
1994–2002	Valerie Evans	Residents

== 1978–2002 Havering council elections ==
There was a revision of ward boundaries in Havering in 1978.

=== 1998 election ===
The election on 7 May 1998 took place on the same day as the 1998 Greater London Authority referendum.

1998 Havering London Borough Council election: Gidea Park (2)
Party	Candidate	Votes	%	±%
Residents	Valerie Evans	1,010		
Residents	Ian Wilkes	995		
Conservative	Edward Eden	896		
Conservative	Robert Whitton	837		
Labour	Francis Bland	403		
Labour	John Daly	379		
Turnout				
Residents hold		Swing		
Residents hold		Swing		

=== 1994 election ===
The election took place on 5 May 1994.

1994 Havering London Borough Council election: Gidea Park (2)
Party	Candidate	Votes	%	±%
Residents	Ian Wilkes	1,099	40.91	New
Residents	Valerie Evans	1,049		
Conservative	Keith Prince	995	37.87	▼13.21
Conservative	Marjorie Ramsey	993		
Labour	Eileen Gordon	563	21.22	▼4.42
Labour	Francis Bland	551		
Registered electors		5,661		▼34
Turnout		2,728	48.19	▼1.64
Rejected ballots		2	0.07	Steady
Residents gain from Conservative		Swing		
Residents gain from Conservative		Swing		

=== 1992 by-election ===
The by-election took place on 10 September 1992, following the resignation of Alice Smith.

1992 Gidea Park by-election
Party	Candidate	Votes	%	±%
Conservative	Marjorie Ramsey	851	51.2	
Residents	Ian Wilkes	427	25.7	
Labour	Francis Bland	365	22.0	
Ind. Conservative	Malcom Brace	18	1.1	
Turnout			29.2	
Conservative hold		Swing		

=== 1990 election ===
The election took place on 3 May 1990.

1990 Havering London Borough Council election: Gidea Park
Party	Candidate	Votes	%	±%
Conservative	Alice Smith	1,519	51.08	
Conservative	Keith Prince	1,508		
Labour	Francis Bland	785	25.64	
Labour	Martin O'Donnell	734		
Independent	Ian Wilkes	690	23.28	
Registered electors		5,695		
Turnout		2,838	49.83	
Rejected ballots		2	0.07	
Conservative hold		Swing		
Conservative hold		Swing		

=== 1988 by-election ===
The by-election took place 21 January 1988, following the resignation of David Cure.

1988 Gidea Park by-election
Party	Candidate	Votes	%	±%
Conservative	David Forster	954		
Labour	Tony Gordon	284		
Liberal Democrats	John Bates	56		
Turnout				
Conservative hold				

=== 1986 election ===
The election took place on 8 May 1986.

1986 Havering London Borough Council election: Gidea Park (2)
Party	Candidate	Votes	%	±%
Conservative	David Cure	1,457		
Conservative	Alice Smith	1,367		
Labour	Jacqueline Kirchner	365		
Labour	Simon Thurlow			
Alliance	John Polyblank	337		
Alliance	Rosa Scurry	327		
Turnout				
Conservative hold		Swing		
Conservative hold		Swing		

=== 1982 election ===
The election took place on 6 May 1982.

1982 Havering London Borough Council election: Gidea Park
Party	Candidate	Votes	%	±%
Conservative	David Cure	1,964		
Conservative	Alice Smith	1,862		
Alliance	Margaret Lakeman	477		
Alliance	Terence Archer	472		
Labour	Christine Blake	231		
Labour	Tony Gordon	220		
Turnout				
Majority				
Conservative hold		Swing		
Conservative hold		Swing		

=== 1978 election ===
The election took place on 4 May 1978.

1978 Havering London Borough Council election: Gidea Park (2)
Party	Candidate	Votes	%	±%
Conservative	John Johnston	2,090		
Conservative	Alice Smith	1,998		
Labour	Judith Paul	428		
Labour	Tony Gordon	419		
Turnout				
Conservative win (new boundaries)				
Conservative win (new boundaries)				

== 1964–1978 Havering council elections ==
=== 1974 election ===
The election took place on 2 May 1974.

1971 Havering London Borough Council election: Gidea Park (2)
Party	Candidate	Votes	%	±%
Conservative	John Johnston	1,661		
Conservative	Alice Smith	1,636		
Liberal	J. Gibbons	360		
Liberal	S. Gibbons	330		
Labour	E. Freeman	315		
Labour	J. Smith	315		
Turnout				
Conservative hold		Swing		
Conservative hold		Swing		

=== 1971 election ===
The election took place on 13 May 1971.

1971 Havering London Borough Council election: Gidea Park (2)
Party	Candidate	Votes	%	±%
Conservative	John Johnston	1,730		
Conservative	N. Kemble	1,677		
Labour	P. Ridley	458		
Labour	A. Houghton	451		
Turnout				
Conservative hold		Swing		
Conservative hold		Swing		

=== 1968 by-election ===
The by-election took place on 27 June 1968.

1968 Gidea Park by-election
Party	Candidate	Votes	%	±%
Conservative	S. New	839		
Independent	E. Bates	183		
Labour	R. Whitworth	58		
Turnout			20.1%	
Conservative hold		Swing		

=== 1968 election ===
The election took place on 9 May 1968.

1968 Havering London Borough Council election: Gidea Park (2)
Party	Candidate	Votes	%	±%
Conservative	R. Clark	2,108		
Conservative	John Johnston	2,069		
Independent	F. Chatfield	213		
Independent	L. Robertson	206		
Labour	A. Houghton	174		
Labour	A. Miles	164		
Turnout				
Conservative hold		Swing		
Conservative hold		Swing		

=== 1964 election ===
The election took place on 7 May 1964.

1964 Havering London Borough Council election: Gidea Park (2)
Party	Candidate	Votes	%	±%
Conservative	G. Johnson	1,596		
Conservative	John Whale	1,582		
Independent	E. Bates	349		
Labour	A. Houghton	347		
Labour	A. Mills	316		
Turnout		2,188	39.1	
Conservative win (new seat)				
Conservative win (new seat)				
