= Beam Park (ward) =

Coordinates: 51.5241°N 0.17456°E

- Electoral ward for the Havering London Borough Council
- Beam Park ward boundaries since 2022
- Borough: Havering
- County: Greater London
- Population: 4,883 (2021) (Note: 2021 Census data reported for 2022 ward boundaries)
- Electorate: 3,697 (2022)
- Major settlements: Beam Park
- Area: 3.797 square kilometres (1.466 sq mi)

Current electoral ward
- Created: 2022
- Number of members: 2
- Councillors: Matthew Stanton; Trevor McKeever
- Created from: South Hornchurch
- GSS code: E05013967

Beam Park is an electoral ward in the London Borough of Havering. The ward was first used in the 2022 elections. It returns two councillors to Havering London Borough Council.

The ward includes the eastern part of the new neighbourhood of Beam Park, Orchard Village and part of South Hornchurch.

== List of councillors ==
Seat	Councillor	Took office	Left office	Party	Election
1	Matthew Stanton	2022	Incumbent	Labour	2022, 2026
2	Trevor McKeever	2022	Incumbent	Labour	2022, 2026

== Summary ==
Councillors elected by party at each general borough election.

== Havering council elections ==
=== 2026 election ===
The election took place on 7 May 2026.

2026 Havering London Borough Council election: Beam Park (2)
Party	Candidate	Votes	%	±%
Labour	Trevor McKeever	488	21.0	−3.8
Labour	Matthew Stanton	473	20.4	−3.8
Reform	Alan Harding	449	19.4	+18.3
Reform	Jai Rathi	367	15.8	N/A
Havering Residents Association	Rob Baker	330	14.2	−6.3
Havering Residents Association	Carol Baker	284	12.3	−7.1
Green	Lois Doo	230	9.9	+8.5
Green	Tito Mogaji	189	8.2	N/A
Conservative	Azza Mohammed	178	7.7	+2.9
Conservative	Michael Braverman	144	6.2	+2.2
Liberal Democrats	Haward Anekwe	40	1.7	N/A
Turnout		2,315	32.6	
Labour hold		Swing		
Labour hold		Swing		

=== 2022 election ===
The election took place on 5 May 2022.

2022 Havering London Borough Council election: Beam Park (2)
Party	Candidate	Votes	%	±%
Labour	Matthew Stanton	530	24.8	N/A
Labour	Trevor McKeever	516	24.2	N/A
Ind. Residents	Ross Elliot	438	20.5	N/A
Ind. Residents	Daniel Beal	415	19.4	N/A
Conservative	Barry Oddy	102	4.8	N/A
Conservative	Thomas Strong	82	3.8	N/A
Green	Kuan Phillips	30	1.4	N/A
Reform	Linda Huxtable	23	1.1	N/A
Turnout		2,136	30.08	N/A
Majority		78	7.3	N/A
Labour win (new seat)				
Labour win (new seat)				
