= Alex Sibley =

English politician and reality television personality

Councillor on Havering London Borough Council
- Incumbent
- Assumed office 8 May 2026 Serving with David Johnson
- Constituency: Emerson Park

Personal details
- Born: 21 March 1979 (age 47) London, England
- Party: Reform UK

Alexander William Hans Sibley (born 21 March 1979) is a British politician, reality TV personality, and model. He was a contestant on Big Brother UK series 3 in 2002 and finished third. He had a modelling and television career. Since May 2026 he has been a Reform UK councillor for Emerson Park ward on Havering London Borough Council.

== Early life ==
Sibley grew up in Hornchurch. His mother is a German former Olympic athlete and his father is a property developer.

== Media career ==
Sibley was a contestant on the third UK series of Big Brother in 2002. He was a runner-up and placed third. He is remembered for miming to the KC and the Sunshine Band song "That's The Way (I Like It)". After appearing on Big Brother, Sibley worked as a model. He appeared in a series of adverts for Domestos bleach from August 2002, featuring the song he was associated with. In March 2003 he became the host of Off The Hook, a television programme on Nickelodeon. He was due to appear in the Big Brother Panto in December 2004.

== Political career ==
Sibley stood as a candidate for Reform UK in the 2026 Havering London Borough Council election in the Emerson Park ward. He was elected with 1,255 votes. He was one of two Reform candidates elected in the ward on 7 May 2026. He was appointed cabinet member for highways on 18 May 2026.

== Personal life ==
He is married and has four children.

== Television ==
| Year | Title | Role | Notes |
|---|---|---|---|
| 2002 | Big Brother UK series 3 | Himself | 70 episodes |
| 2002 | Shooting Stars | Himself | 1 episode |
| 2002 | Blind Date | Himself | Episode: "Celebrity Christmas Special" |
| 2003 | Off the Hook | Himself | Series on Nickelodeon |
| 2003 | The Pilot Show | Himself | 1 episode |
| 2003 | Make My Day | Himself | 1 episode |
| 2007 | Big Brother UK series 8 | Himself | 1 episode |
| 2009 | Big Brother UK series 10 | Himself | 1 episode |
| 2015 | Big Brother UK series 16 | Himself | 1 episode |
| 2015 | Reality Bites | Himself | 1 episode |
