= Reality Bites (TV series) =

2015 British comedy panel game show

- Genre: Comedy panel game
- Presented by: Stephen Mulhern
- Starring: Emma Willis; Joel Dommett
- Country of origin: United Kingdom
- Original language: English
- No. of series: 1
- No. of episodes: 6

Production
- Executive producer: Dan Baldwin
- Running time: 45 minutes (inc. adverts)
- Production company: Hungry Bear Media

Original release
- Network: ITV2
- Release: 5 February – 12 March 2015

Reality Bites is a British comedy panel game show presented by Stephen Mulhern. The programme made its debut on ITV2 on 5 February 2015. In each episode two teams of three compete and they are captained by Emma Willis and Joel Dommett. The questions and tasks are about reality television from around the world.

== Format ==
- The Real World: The teams watch clips from foreign reality shows and have to work out what the show is all about.
- Reality Star in a Reasonably Priced Bar: Reality show participants go into a bar to see how many people recognise them. The teams must guess the number.
- Where The Hell Am I?: A member of each team is blindfolded and challenged to identify a well-known reality show and reality star by using touch alone.
- Big Fact Hunt: The teams have to guess whether a series of facts Stephen has uncovered about a different star each week are true or false. These will be confirmed by the star themselves, live in the studio.

== Episodes ==
The coloured backgrounds denote the result of each of the shows:

– indicates Emma's team won.
– indicates Joel's team won.
– indicates the game ended in a draw

| Episode | First broadcast | Emma's team | Joel's team | Scores | Other guests | Winner |
|---|---|---|---|---|---|---|
| 1x01 | 5 February 2015 | Jimmy Bullard; Joe Lycett | Bruno Tonioli; Luisa Zissman | 7–5 | Deirdre Kelly; Mark Jenkins; Charlotte Crosby; Alex Sibley | Emma's team |
| 1x02 | 12 February 2015 | Jamie Laing; Matt Edmondson | Emma Bunton; Rylan Clark | 3–4 | Ashleigh Butler; Abz Love; Gary "Gaz" Beadle; Derek Acorah | Joel's team |
| 1x03 | 19 February 2015 | Jake Quickenden; Katherine Ryan | Joe Swash; Stephanie Pratt | 3–5 | Dan Osborne; Solomon Akhtar; Nikki Grahame; Richard Burr | Joel's team |
| 1x04 | 26 February 2015 | Marvin Humes; Alex Brooker; Katie Hopkins | Frankie Bridge; Kendra Wilkinson | 4–3 | Amy Childs; Chloe-Jasmine Whichello; George Gilbey; Johnny Robinson; Matthew Burton; Musharaf Asghar | Emma's team |
| 1x05 | 5 March 2015 | Andrew Maxwell; Denise van Outen | Katie Price; Ollie Locke | 7–4 | Louise Hazel; Russell Grant; Stevi Ritchie; Rex Newmark | Joel's team |
| 1x06 | 12 March 2015 | Mark-Francis Vandelli; Bobby Mair | Peter Jones; Kerry Katona | 7–4 | Wagner Fiuza-Carrilho; Stuart Baggs; Levi Roots; Kelly Hoppen; Kellie Maloney | Joel's team |
