= 2022 Havering London Borough Council election =

2022 local election in Havering

- 5 May 2022

All 55 Havering London Borough Council seats 28 seats needed for a majority
	First party	Second party
Leader	Damian White	Ray Morgon
Party	Conservative	Havering Residents Association
Leader's seat	Havering-atte-Bower	Hacton
Last election	25 seats, 37.1%	17 seats, 28.4%
Seats won	23	20
Seat change	▼2	▲1
Popular vote	57,193	66,248
Percentage	33.1%	38.4%
Swing	▼9.4%	▲10.0%
	Third party	Fourth party
Leader	Keith Darvill	Darren Wise
Party	Labour	Harold Wood Hill Park RA
Leader's seat	Heaton	Harold Wood
Last election	5 seats, 20.6%	3 seats, 3.4%
Seats won	9	3
Seat change	▲4	0
Popular vote	38,512	5,892
Percentage	22.3%	3.4%
Swing	▲1.7%	0.0%
- Map of the results of the 2022 Havering London Borough Council election. Conservatives in blue, Havering Residents Association in dark green, Independent Residents Group in grey, Labour in red.
Council Leader before election
Damian White
Conservative (No Overall Control)
Elected Council Leader
Ray Morgon
HRA (Coalition with Labour, No Overall Control)

The 2022 Havering London Borough Council election was held on 5 May 2022 to elect all 55 members of Havering London Borough Council. The elections took place alongside local elections in the other London boroughs and elections to local authorities across the United Kingdom.

In the previous election in 2018, the council remained under no overall control. The Conservatives were the largest party, winning 25 out of the 55 seats with the Havering Residents Association forming the principal opposition with 17 of the remaining seats.

The 2022 election took place under new election boundaries, which increased the number of councillors to 55. The Conservatives remained the largest party and the council remained under no overall control. After weeks of negotiations, Conservative leader Damian White was replaced by HRA leader Ray Morgon on 25 May as Leader of the Council in a coalition with Labour.

== Background ==
=== History ===
Result of the 2018 borough election

The thirty-two London boroughs were established in 1965 by the London Government Act 1963. They are the principal authorities in Greater London and have responsibilities including education, housing, planning, highways, social services, libraries, recreation, waste, environmental health and revenue collection. Some of the powers are shared with the Greater London Authority, which also manages passenger transport, police and fire.

Since its formation, Havering has most often been under no overall control with no single political party holding a majority of its seats. It has also been controlled by the Conservative Party for nineteen years and by the Labour Party for three years. Local elections have seen Conservative, Labour and Liberal Democrat councillors returned, with the last Liberal Democrat councillor having been elected in 2006. The 2006 election also saw a British National Party candidate elected, and the 2014 election resulted in the election of a UK Independence Party candidate. The authority also has a long history of independent and residents' association candidates winning election, including the Havering Residents Association (HRA).

In the most recent elections in 2018, the Conservatives won 25 seats with 37.1%; the HRA won 17 seats with the one elected Harold Hill Independent Party winning one councillor who joined the HRA's group; and the Labour Party and independent residents won five seats each. The only councillor elected as an independent, Michael Deon-Burton for South Hornchurch, joined the Conservative group later in May 2021 and was named as deputy mayor of the council. The result was the only hung council in Greater London. The Harold Wood Residents Association, independent of the Havering Residents Association, formed a governing agreement with the Conservative Party on the night of the 2018 election. The Conservative councillor Damian White, who had served as deputy leader of the council from 2014 to 2018, was made leader of the council following the election.

=== Council term ===
A residents' association councillor for Cranham ward, Clarence Barrett, died in March 2019. A by-election was held to fill his seat in May 2019, which was won by the residents' association candidate Linda van den Hende. In May 2019, a residents' association councillor for Elm Park, Sally Miller, defected to the Conservative Party.

Along with most other London boroughs, Havering was subject to a boundary review ahead of the 2022 election. The Local Government Boundary Commission for England (LGBCE) concluded that the council should have fifty-five councillors, an increase of one, and produced new election boundaries following a period of consultation. The Conservative councillor Bob Perry left his party after revealing he had secretly recorded a Conservative group meeting discussing ways to design election boundaries to be advantageous to them. In response, the LGBCE extended the period of consultation and made changes to planned ward boundaries. A three-member panel including two Conservative councillors and the independent councillor Linda Van der Hende was convened to decide whether to investigate the Conservative group leader, Damian White, over claims he had tried to gerrymander election boundaries for political gain. Reporters and the public were blocked from attending the meeting. The Conservative panel members voted to discard the complaints, against the advice of the council's director of law and governance, on the grounds that they were submitted more than ninety days after the recording had been made, even though they had been submitted shortly after the recording was published.

== Campaign ==
Keith Prince, the member of the London Assembly for the area, announced he was standing as a Conservative candidate in the council election. Carol Perry announced she would stand for the Havering Residents Association in the same ward as the Conservative group leader who her husband Bob Perry had recorded saying that the council chief executive had let him affect the council's submission for new election boundaries so they would be "really politically advantageous".

In March 2022, the council asked all staff to consider voluntary redundancy, aiming to remove 400 staff roles. The trade union Unison and some councillors and local residents criticised the decision, saying that current staffing levels already meant long delays before getting a response from council staff, including one resident who waited three weeks for exposed asbestos to be removed.

== Electoral process ==
Havering, as is the case for all London borough councils, elects all of its councillors at once every four years, with the previous election having taken place in 2018. The election took place by multi-member first-past-the-post voting, with each ward being represented by two or three councillors. Electors had as many votes as there are councillors to be elected in their ward, with the top two or three being elected.

All registered electors (British, Irish, Commonwealth and European Union citizens) living in London aged 18 or over were entitled to vote in the election. People who lived at two addresses in different councils, such as university students with different term-time and holiday addresses, were entitled to be registered for and vote in elections in both local authorities. Voting in-person at polling stations took place from 7:00 to 22:00 on election day, and voters were able to apply for postal votes or proxy votes in advance of the election.

== Previous council composition ==
Council composition following the 2018 election

After 2018 election		Before 2022 election	
Party	Seats	Party	Seats
Conservative	25	Conservative	25
Havering Residents Association	17	Havering Residents Association	17
Labour	5	Labour	5
Independent Residents Group	5	Independent Residents Group	5
Harold Hill Ind.	1	Independent	2
Independent	1		

== Results summary ==
2022 Havering London Borough Council election
Party	Seats	Gains	Losses	Net gain/loss	Seats %	Votes %	Votes	+/−
Conservative	23	3	5	-2	41.8	33.1	57,193	-4.0
Havering Residents Association	20	4	3	1	36.4	38.4	66,248	+10.0
Labour	9	4	0	4	16.4	22.3	38,512	+1.7
Harold Wood Hill Park RA	3	0	0	0	5.5	3.4	5,892	±0.0
Green	0	0	0	Steady	0.0	1.5	2,578	-0.4
Liberal Democrats	0	0	0	Steady	0.0	0.9	1,523	-0.6
Independent	0	0	0	Steady	0.0	0.3	499	-1.5
English Constitution	0	0	0	Steady	0.0	0.2	265	N/A

== Ward results ==
=== Beam Park ===
Beam Park (2)
Party	Candidate	Votes	%	±%
Labour	Matthew Stanton	530	49.6	N/A
Labour	Trevor Mckeever	516	48.3	N/A
Ind. Residents	Ross Elliot	438	41.0	N/A
Ind. Residents	Daniel Beal	415	38.9	N/A
Conservative	Barry Oddy	102	9.6	N/A
Conservative	Thomas Strong	82	7.7	N/A
Green	Kuan Phillips	30	2.8	N/A
Reform	Linda Huxtable	23	2.2	N/A
Turnout		2,136	30.08	N/A
Majority		78	7.3	N/A
Labour win (new seat)				
Labour win (new seat)				

=== Cranham ===
Cranham (3)
Party	Candidate	Votes	%	±%
Residents	Gillian Ford	3,107	80.5	+12.5
Residents	John Tyler	2,807	72.8	+6.7
Residents	Philip Ruck	2,636	68.3	+10.3
Conservative	Tracey McEvoy	535	13.9	−8.7
Conservative	Danny Weedon	496	12.9	−4.9
Labour	Kate Darvill	449	11.6	+0.6
Conservative	Poh Foong	435	11.3	−2.5
Labour	David Dawson	338	8.8	−0.8
Labour	Jeffery Stafford	306	7.9	+1.2
Green	David Hughes	289	7.5	0
Liberal Democrats	Susanne Brown	121	3.1	N/A
Liberal Democrats	Philip Sait	55	1.4	N/A
Turnout			40.83	+8.32
Majority		2,101	54.4	+19.0
Residents win (new boundaries)				
Residents win (new boundaries)				
Residents win (new boundaries)				

=== Elm Park ===
Elm Park (3)
Party	Candidate	Votes	%	±%
Residents	Barry Mugglestone	2,971	70.7	+13.1
Residents	Stephanie Nunn	2,934	69.8	+14.4
Residents	Julie Wilkes	2,827	67.2	+13.6
Labour	Janet Davis	769	18.3	−2.4
Labour	Graham Carr	709	16.9	−2.6
Labour	Michael Davis	616	14.7	−1.4
Conservative	Valerie Best	608	14.5	−5.6
Conservative	Azza Azharuddin	474	11.3	−6.0
Conservative	Matej Travnicek	443	10.5	−4.1
Green	Gerald Haines	263	6.3	+2.3
Turnout			35.51	−2.01
Majority		2,058	48.9	+16.0
Residents win (new boundaries)				
Residents win (new boundaries)				
Residents win (new boundaries)				

=== Emerson Park ===
Emerson Park (2)
Party	Candidate	Votes	%	±%
Residents	Laurance Garrard	1,512	52.5	+15.5
Residents	David Godwin	1,498	52.0	+16.4
Conservative	Dominic Swan	947	32.9	−13.2
Conservative	Noshaba Khiljee	835	29.0	−15.4
Labour	Anil Gupta	331	11.5	−2.6
Labour	Michael McCarthy	331	11.5	−2.2
Independent	Sharon Heron	104	3.6	N/A
Independent	Victoria Hogan	95	3.3	N/A
Liberal Democrats	Pamela Coles	64	2.2	+/−0
Liberal Democrats	Graham Potter	44	1.5	−0.7
Turnout			41.11	−0.07
Majority		558	19.1	+19.0
Residents win (new boundaries)				
Residents win (new boundaries)				

=== Gooshays ===
Gooshays (3)
Party	Candidate	Votes	%	±%
Labour	Patricia Brown	1,038	39.8	+6.7
Labour	Paul McGeary	1,014	38.9	+9.6
Labour	Katharine Tumilty	901	34.5	+7.1
Ind. Residents	Isabelle Alexander	754	28.9	+23.0
Conservative	Emilia Kukielka	721	27.6	+6.8
Conservative	Gregory Samuel	720	27.6	+9.0
Ind. Residents	Grant MacMaster	689	26.4	+21.6
Ind. Residents	Monica Puncheon	575	22.0	+17.6
Conservative	Rashpinder Mahal	568	21.8	+4.0
Residents	Margaret Kershaw	346	13.3	N/A
Residents	Graham Trew	263	10.1	N/A
Green	Katie Morant	239	9.2	+4.0
Turnout			23.5	−17.5
Majority		147	5.6	+4.3
Labour win (new boundaries)				
Labour win (new boundaries)				
Labour win (new boundaries)				

=== Hacton ===
Hacton (2)
Party	Candidate	Votes	%	±%
Residents	Ray Morgon	2,315	80.5	+15.3
Residents	Reginald Whitney	2,124	73.8	+12.8
Conservative	Paul Connew	430	14.9	−4.9
Conservative	Patrick Marks	337	11.7	−7.5
Labour	Susan Jiggens	275	9.6	−4.3
Labour	Sinead Earley	272	9.5	−3.6
Turnout			41.2	0.3
Majority		1,694	58.9	+22.6
Residents win (new boundaries)				
Residents win (new boundaries)				

=== Harold Wood ===
Harold Wood (3)
Party	Candidate	Votes	%	±%
Ind. Residents	Brian Eagling	2,081	58.5	−10.2
Ind. Residents	Martin Goode	1,884	53.0	−12.3
Ind. Residents	Darren Wise	1,812	51.0	−11.9
Labour	Carole Beth	667	18.8	+2.8
Labour	Krystyna Koseda	613	17.2	+2.3
Labour	Sally Onaiwu	580	16.3	+3.5
Conservative	Tolulope Akinboboye	566	15.9	+2.7
Residents	Daniel Lammin	484	13.6	N/A
Residents	Katy Turner	472	13.3	N/A
Residents	Adela Meer	430	12.1	N/A
Conservative	Ruth Edes	426	12.0	−1.0
Conservative	Godfrey Webster	405	11.4	+0.4
Liberal Democrats	Jonathan Coles	145	4.1	−0.4
Liberal Democrats	Ian Sanderson	99	2.8	N/A
Turnout			35.6	−1.33
Majority		1,145	32.2	−14.7
Ind. Residents win (new boundaries)				
Ind. Residents win (new boundaries)				
Ind. Residents win (new boundaries)				

=== Havering-atte-Bower ===
Havering-atte-Bower (3)
Party	Candidate	Votes	%	±%
Conservative	Raymond Best	1,703	58.0	−6.1
Conservative	John Crowder	1,663	56.7	−4.7
Conservative	Damian White	1,504	51.2	−6.0
Residents	Carol Perry	1,157	39.4	N/A
Labour	Sanchia Alasia	1,008	34.4	+9.8
Labour	Benedicta Lashley	977	33.3	+12.2
Labour	Taimaz Ranjbaran	790	26.9	+6.1
Turnout			29.16	−2.94
Majority		347	11.8	−20.8
Conservative win (new seat)				
Conservative win (new seat)				
Conservative win (new seat)				

=== Heaton ===
Heaton (3)
Party	Candidate	Votes	%	±%
Labour	Mandy Anderson	1,267	48.7	+13.0
Labour	Keith Darvill	1,200	46.1	+11.9
Labour	Frankie Walker	1,153	44.3	+10.5
Conservative	Oluwatoyin Ajidele	775	29.8	+0.7
Conservative	Edward Green	645	24.8	−1.9
Conservative	Richard Rimkus	598	23.0	−0.3
Ind. Residents	Martin Glenn	563	21.6	N/A
Ind. Residents	Wendy Brice-Thompson	548	21.0	N/A
Ind. Residents	Mary Bakoulas	463	17.8	N/A
Residents	Bill Lavender	308	11.8	N/A
Residents	Lesley Tyler	292	11.2	N/A
Turnout			23.79	−6.39
Majority		378	14.5	+9.8
Labour win (new boundaries)				
Labour win (new boundaries)				
Labour win (new boundaries)				

=== Hylands and Harrow Lodge ===
Hylands and Harrow Lodge (3)
Party	Candidate	Votes	%	±%
Residents	James Glass	1,729	46.8	+19.6
Residents	John Wood	1,713	46.3	+20.8
Conservative	Christine Smith	1,596	43.2	−13.4
Conservative	Ciaran White	1,483	40.1	−16.1
Conservative	Alexander Donald	1,476	39.9	−14.4
Labour	Robert Farnsworth	822	22.2	+7.3
Labour	Michael Wood	756	20.4	+6.3
Labour	Mohammad Hassan	689	18.6	+5.1
Green	Amanda Haines	562	15.2	+10.7
English Constitution	Colin Birch	140	3.8	N/A
English Constitution	Jane Birch	125	3.4	N/A
Turnout			37.83	−4.51
Majority		113	3.1	−24.0
Residents win (new seat)				
Residents win (new seat)				
Conservative win (new seat)				

=== Marshalls and Rise Park ===
Marshalls and Rise Park (3)
Party	Candidate	Votes	%	±%
Conservative	Philippa Crowder	2,122	53.7	+0.8
Conservative	Osman Dervish	1,981	50.1	+2.4
Conservative	Robby Misir	1,955	49.5	+2.7
Residents	Andy Mann	1,440	36.4	+0.3
Residents	Kevin Barrett	1,432	36.2	+6.2
Residents	Robert Chesney	1,395	35.3	+6.0
Labour	Siobhan McGeary	547	13.8	−1.8
Labour	Birendra Singh	497	12.6	−1.7
Labour	Carol Singh	488	12.3	−0.6
Turnout			41.13	+2.57
Majority		515	13.1	+2.4
Conservative win (new seat)				
Conservative win (new seat)				
Conservative win (new seat)				

=== Mawneys ===
Mawneys (3)
Party	Candidate	Votes	%	±%
Conservative	Jason Frost	1,627	49.5	−16.6
Conservative	Dilip Patel	1,595	48.5	−13.0
Conservative	Carol Smith	1,467	44.6	−15.6
Residents	Carol Baker	1,095	33.3	+16.2
Residents	Linda Trew	1,045	31.8	+13.3
Residents	Denise Hipson	963	29.3	N/A
Labour	Alison De Melo	681	20.7	+3.9
Labour	Christine McGeary	631	19.2	+3.2
Labour	Daniel Nichols	587	17.9	+4.2
Liberal Democrats	Grenville Brown	87	2.6	−1.3
Liberal Democrats	John Deeks	86	2.6	N/A
Turnout			33.56	−3.34
Majority		372	11.3	−31.8
Conservative win (new boundaries)				
Conservative win (new boundaries)				
Conservative win (new boundaries)				

=== Rainham and Wennington ===
Rainham and Wennington (3)
Party	Candidate	Votes	%	±%
Conservative	Susan Ospreay	1,443	44.5	+28.4
Conservative	Jacqueline McArdle	1,295	40.0	+29.7
Conservative	Sarah Edwards	1,206	37.2	+27.6
Ind. Residents	Jeffrey Tucker	1,194	36.9	−3.1
Ind. Residents	David Durant	955	29.5	+0.3
Labour	Simon Darvill	881	27.2	+1.0
Ind. Residents	Henry Tebbutt	848	26.2	−2.1
Labour	Mohammed Ambia	827	25.5	+1.2
Labour	Antonia Osammor	825	25.5	+3.8
Green	Susan Adebayo	242	7.5	+2.0
Turnout			35.1	−0.05
Majority		12	0.3	−1.7
Conservative win (new boundaries)				
Conservative win (new boundaries)				
Conservative win (new boundaries)				

=== Rush Green and Crowlands ===
Rush Green and Crowlands (3)
Party	Candidate	Votes	%	±%
Conservative	Robert Benham	1,561	47.4	−8.2
Conservative	Vidyotama Persaud	1,536	46.7	−4.3
Conservative	Timothy Ryan	1,472	44.7	−6.1
Labour	Angelina Leatherbarrow	1,276	38.8	+1.0
Labour	John Curtis	1,258	38.2	+5.5
Labour	Robert Ritchie	1,184	36.0	+4.3
Residents	Gemma Bevan	578	17.6	N/A
Residents	Ajay Singh	482	14.6	N/A
Residents	Tracey Niemierko	466	14.2	N/A
Independent	Robert O`Dea	63	1.9	N/A
Turnout			32.84	+0.33
Majority		196	5.9	−7.1
Conservative win (new seat)				
Conservative win (new seat)				
Conservative win (new seat)				

=== South Hornchurch ===
South Hornchurch (2)
Party	Candidate	Votes	%	±%
Ind. Residents	Natasha Summers	1,023	44.8	+5.3
Ind. Residents	Graham Williamson	1,019	44.7	+7.4
Labour	Julia Pearman	669	29.3	−1.0
Labour	Mirza Akhtar	664	29.1	−0.5
Conservative	Michael Burton	573	25.1	+6.7
Conservative	Andromahi Themistocli	500	21.9	+5.6
Green	Kim Arrowsmith	116	5.1	+0.3
Turnout			31.8	−0.63
Majority		350	15.4	+8.4
Ind. Residents win (new boundaries)				
Ind. Residents win (new boundaries)				

=== Squirrels Heath ===
Squirrels Heath (3)
Party	Candidate	Votes	%	±%
Conservative	Christine Vickery	2,383	54.4	−13.1
Conservative	Keith Prince	2,331	53.2	−11.7
Conservative	Michael White	2,295	52.4	−12.0
Residents	Karen Bryan	1,124	25.7	N/A
Residents	Robert Perry	967	22.1	N/A
Residents	Colin Rushworth	897	20.5	N/A
Labour	Mary Burke	871	19.9	−1.7
Labour	Nigel Meyer	741	16.9	−4.5
Labour	Christopher Purnell	714	16.3	−3.9
Independent	Melvin Wallace	237	5.4	N/A
Liberal Democrats	Thomas Clarke	235	5.4	N/A
Liberal Democrats	Caroline Hibbs-Brown	184	4.2	N/A
Liberal Democrats	Christopher Stafford	161	3.7	N/A
Turnout			38.54	+3.27
Majority		1,171	26.7	−16.1
Conservative win (new boundaries)				
Conservative win (new boundaries)				
Conservative win (new boundaries)				

=== St Alban's ===
St Alban's (2)
Party	Candidate	Votes	%	±%
Conservative	Judith Holt	939	47.3	N/A
Labour	Jane Keane	852	42.9	N/A
Conservative	Aaron Young	844	42.5	N/A
Labour	Hope Mendy	798	40.2	N/A
Residents	Kimberley Gould	295	14.9	N/A
Residents	Ian Swann	240	12.1	N/A
Turnout			36.84	N/A
Majority		8	0.4	N/A
Conservative win (new seat)				
Labour win (new seat)				

=== St Andrew's ===
St Andrew's (3)
Party	Candidate	Votes	%	±%
Residents	Paul Middleton	2,855	68.6	+27.8
Residents	Gerry O'Sullivan	2,823	67.8	+27.8
Residents	Bryan Vincent	2,700	64.9	+27.4
Conservative	Henry Frost	747	17.9	−20.2
Conservative	John Mylod	735	17.7	−17.3
Conservative	Oliver Rose	702	16.9	−16.8
Labour	Nichola Butler	624	15.0	−1.6
Labour	Joseph Jervis	534	12.8	−0.7
Labour	Abdal Miah	471	11.3	−1.5
Green	Martin Davis	295	7.1	+1.3
Turnout			38.98	−0.45
Majority		1,953	47.0	+46.4
Residents win (new boundaries)				
Residents win (new boundaries)				
Residents win (new boundaries)				

=== St Edward's ===
St Edward's (3)
Party	Candidate	Votes	%	±%
Conservative	Joshua Chapman	1,108	47.2	N/A
Conservative	David Taylor	1,003	42.7	N/A
Conservative	Nisha Patel	952	40.5	N/A
Residents	Ann Kendrick	662	28.2	N/A
Residents	Alexander Stilwell	602	25.6	N/A
Labour	Alexander Leatherbarrow	594	25.3	N/A
Labour	Deborah Williams	589	25.1	N/A
Labour	Abiodun Adesanya	588	25.0	N/A
Residents	David Tyler	526	22.4	N/A
Green	Karen Kruzycka	210	8.9	N/A
Liberal Democrats	Peter Davies	120	5.1	N/A
Liberal Democrats	Kerrie Sait	92	3.9	N/A
Turnout			32.87	N/A
Majority		290	12.3	N/A
Conservative win (new seat)				
Conservative win (new seat)				
Conservative win (new seat)				

=== Upminster ===
Upminster (3)
Party	Candidate	Votes	%	±%
Residents	Linda Hawthorn	3,028	71.2	+5.7
Residents	Oscar Ford	2,954	69.5	+4.7
Residents	Christopher Wilkins	2,930	68.9	+8.3
Conservative	Adam Baker	953	22.4	−1.5
Conservative	Sally Miller (Note: Sally Miller was a councillor for Elm Park ward prior to the election and was elected for the Hornchurch Residents Association.)	711	16.7	+0.5
Conservative	Bernice Robinson	584	13.7	−1.8
Labour	Patrick Chalk	453	10.7	−0.1
Labour	Suzanne McGeary	419	9.9	+0.3
Green	Melanie Collins	362	8.5	+1.0
Labour	John Sullivan	362	8.5	−0.2
Turnout			42.3%	−3.17
Majority		1,977	46.5	+9.8
Residents hold		Swing		
Residents hold		Swing		
Residents hold		Swing		

== By-elections ==
The following by-elections took place between the 2022 and 2026 elections:

- 2023 Upminster by-election
