= Rainham and Wennington =

Electoral ward in London Borough of Havering, returning three councillors since 2002

- Electoral ward for the Havering London Borough Council
- Rainham and Wennington ward boundaries since 2022
- Borough: Havering
- County: Greater London
- Population: 13,567 (2021) (Note: 2021 Census data reported for 2022 ward boundaries)
- Electorate: 9,662 (2022)
- Major settlements: Rainham and Wennington
- Area: 15.34 square kilometres (5.92 sq mi)

Current electoral ward
- Created: 1965
- Number of members: 3
- Members: Susan Ospreay; George Harwin; Joe Lock
- GSS code: E05000318 (2002–2022); E05013979 (2022–present)

Rainham and Wennington is an electoral ward in the London Borough of Havering. The ward was first used in the 2002 elections. It returns three councillors to Havering London Borough Council. There was a revision of ward boundaries in 2022.

At the first five general borough elections the ward returned councillors standing as "Independent Residents Association" candidates who were not aligned with the Havering Residents Association council grouping that most residents association councillors in Havering have joined. By-elections in 2003 and 2004 were won by the Labour Party candidates but they did not retain their seats at the next election in 2006. The election in 2022 was won for the first time by three Conservative Party candidates. However, in the aftermath of the 2022 Wennington wildfire all three switched parties and joined the Havering Residents Association group on the council.

== List of councillors ==
Term	Councillor	Party
2002–2022	Jeffrey Tucker	Ind. Residents
2002–2004	Wayne Redgrave	Ind. Residents
2002–2003	Brian Clarke	Ind. Residents
2003–2006	Harry Webb	Labour
2004–2006	Anthony Ellis	Labour
2006–2010	Coral Jeffery	Ind. Residents
2006–2010	Mark Stewart	Ind. Residents
2010–2014	Mark Logan	Ind. Residents
2010–2022	David Durant	Ind. Residents
2014–2022	Keith Roberts	Ind. Residents
2022–present	Susan Ospreay (Note: Susan Ospreay changed parties in 2022)	Conservative
2022–present	Susan Ospreay	Residents
2022–2026	Jacqueline McArdle (Note: Jacqueline McArdle changed parties in 2022 and 2024)	Conservative
2022–2026	Jacqueline McArdle	Residents
2022–2026	Jacqueline McArdle	Conservative
2022–2026	Sarah Edwards (Note: Sarah Edwards changed parties in 2022)	Conservative
2022–2026	Sarah Edwards	Residents
2026–present	Joe Lock	Reform
2026–present	George Harwin	Reform

== Summary ==
Councillors elected by party at each general borough election.

- Ind. Residents
- Conservative
- Residents
- Reform

== Havering council elections since 2022 ==
There was a revision of ward boundaries in Havering in 2022. The ward gained the Hornchurch Marshes and Frog Island area that was previously part of the South Hornchurch ward.

=== 2026 election ===
The election took place on 7 May 2026.

2026 Havering London Borough Council election: Rainham and Wennington (3)
Party	Candidate	Votes	%	±%
Residents	Sue Ospreay	1,780	41.0	+4.1
Reform	George Harwin	1,741	40.1	N/A
Reform	Joe Lock	1,675	38.6	N/A
Residents	Nikki Digby	1,484	34.2	+4.7
Reform	Justin Halabi	1,443	33.2	N/A
Residents	Daniel Beal	1,344	31.0	+4.8
Labour	Mohammed Abdullah	596	13.7	−13.5
Labour	Fay Hough	592	13.6	−11.9
Labour	Sue Watson	534	12.3	−13.2
Green	Erin Mansfield	323	7.4	−0.1
Conservative	Sade Adeeko	290	6.7	−37.8
Green	Leona Munro	257	5.9	N/A
Green	Mark Yetton	229	5.3	N/A
Conservative	Anamul Hoque	208	4.8	−35.2
Conservative	Mohammad Sameemuddin	179	4.1	−33.1
Liberal Democrats	Bogdan Coliba	95	2.2	N/A
Turnout			44.97	
Residents gain from Conservative		Swing		
Reform gain from Conservative		Swing		
Reform gain from Conservative		Swing		

=== 2022 election ===
The election took place on 5 May 2022.

2022 Havering London Borough Council election: Rainham and Wennington (3)
Party	Candidate	Votes	%	±%
Conservative	Susan Ospreay	1,443	44.5	
Conservative	Jacqueline McArdle	1,295	40.0	
Conservative	Sarah Edwards	1,206	37.2	
Ind. Residents	Jeffrey Tucker	1,194	36.9	
Ind. Residents	David Durant	955	29.5	
Labour	Simon Darvill	881	27.2	
Ind. Residents	Henry Tebbutt	848	26.2	
Labour	Mohammed Ambia	827	25.5	
Labour	Antonia Osammor	825	25.5	
Green	Susan Adebayo	242	7.5	
Turnout			35.1	
Majority		12	0.3	
Conservative win (new boundaries)				
Conservative win (new boundaries)				
Conservative win (new boundaries)				

Following the 2022 Wennington wildfire, the three Conservative Party councillors for the ward switched to the Havering Residents Association.

== 2002–2022 Havering council elections ==
Rainham and Wennington ward boundaries from 2002 to 2022

There was a revision of ward boundaries in Havering in 2002.

=== 2018 election ===
The election took place on 3 May 2018.

2018 Havering London Borough Council election: Rainham and Wennington (3)
Party	Candidate	Votes	%	±%
Ind. Residents	Jeffrey Tucker	1,387	40.0	
Ind. Residents	David Durant	1,011	29.2	
Ind. Residents	Tony Durdin	981	28.3	
Independent	Susan Ospreay	913	26.3	
Labour	Fay Hough	907	26.2	
Labour	Kim Arrowsmith	841	24.3	
Labour	Christopher Freeman	753	21.7	
Independent	Keith Roberts	710	20.5	
Independent	Jacqueline McArdle	653	18.8	
Conservative	John Clark	557	16.1	
Conservative	Billy Kensit	357	10.3	
UKIP	Julian Clark	351	10.1	
Conservative	Eileen Rosindell	332	9.6	
Green	Azzees Minott	191	5.5	
Turnout			35,15%	
Majority		68		
Ind. Residents hold		Swing		
Ind. Residents hold		Swing		
Ind. Residents hold		Swing		

=== 2014 election ===
The election took place on 22 May 2014.

2014 Havering London Borough Council election: Rainham and Wennington (3)
Party	Candidate	Votes	%	±%
Ind. Residents	Jeffrey Tucker	1,982		
Ind. Residents	David Durant	1,395		
Ind. Residents	Keith Roberts	1,390		
UKIP	Michael Smith	1,284		
Labour	Anthony Ellis	973		
Labour	Alan Vickers	752		
Labour	Martin Earley	698		
Conservative	Ruth Camilleri	350		
Conservative	Bernadette Oddy	300		
Conservative	Stuart Farquhar	263		
Green	Maria Paterlini-Phillips	206		
Liberal Democrats	Pamela Coles	74		
Turnout			39	
Ind. Residents hold		Swing		
Ind. Residents hold		Swing		
Ind. Residents hold		Swing		

=== 2010 election ===
The election on 6 May 2010 took place on the same day as the United Kingdom general election.

2010 Havering London Borough Council election: Rainham and Wennington (3)
Party	Candidate	Votes	%	±%
Ind. Residents	Jeffrey Tucker	3,406		
Ind. Residents	Mark Logan	1,779		
Ind. Residents	David Durant	1,707		
Labour	Anthony Ellis	1,621		
Independent	Coral Jeffery	1,599		
Conservative	Sharon Edwards	1,166		
Conservative	Paul Cockling	1,105		
Independent	Mark Stewart	1,075		
Labour	Martin Earley	1,042		
Labour	Michael Hitchin	1,008		
Conservative	Matthew Walsh	903		
Turnout				
Ind. Residents hold		Swing		
Ind. Residents hold		Swing		
Ind. Residents hold		Swing		

=== 2006 election ===
The election took place on 4 May 2006.

2006 Havering London Borough Council election: Rainham and Wennington (3)
Party	Candidate	Votes	%	±%
Ind. Residents	Jeffrey Tucker	2,211	59.2	
Ind. Residents	Coral Jeffery	1,900		
Ind. Residents	Mark Stewart	1,685		
Labour	Tony Ellis	870	23.3	
Conservative	George Daniels	651	17.4	
Labour	Kathleen Vann	587		
Labour	Denis O'Flynn	545		
Turnout			36.9	
Ind. Residents hold		Swing		
Ind. Residents gain from Labour		Swing		
Ind. Residents gain from Labour		Swing		

=== 2004 by-election ===
The by-election was held on 15 July 2004 following the resignation of Wayne Redgrave.

2004 Rainham and Wennington by-election
Party	Candidate	Votes	%	±%
Labour	Anthony Ellis	805	31.2	−4.1
Conservative	Maureen Carter	776	30.1	+0.8
BNP	Mark Blunden	549	21.3	+21.3
Ind. Residents	Graham Croft	265	10.3	−12.2
National Liberal	David Durant	93	3.6	−0.7
Green	Martin Mannion	89	3.5	−2.3
Majority		29	1.1	
Turnout		2,577	28.5	
Labour gain from Ind. Residents		Swing		

=== 2003 by-election ===
The by-election was held on 3 April 2003, following the resignation of Brian Clarke.

2003 Rainham and Wennington by-election
Party	Candidate	Votes	%	±%
Labour	Harry Webb	771	35.3	+2.3
Conservative	Maureen Carter	640	29.3	+15.8
Ind. Residents	Anthony Turvey	491	22.5	−31.1
Green	David Peacock	127	5.8	+5.8
National Liberal	David Durrant	93	4.3	+4.3
UKIP	Terry Murray	62	2.8	+2.8
Majority		131	6.0	
Turnout		2,184	23.6	
Labour gain from Ind. Residents		Swing		

=== 2002 election ===
The election took place on 2 May 2002. As an experiment, it was a postal voting election, with the option to hand the papers in on election day.

2002 Havering London Borough Council election: Rainham and Wennington (3)
Party	Candidate	Votes	%	±%
Ind. Residents	Jeffrey Tucker	2,248		
Ind. Residents	Wayne Redgrave	2,086		
Ind. Residents	Brian Clarke	2,020		
Labour	Harry Webb	1,383		
Labour	Anthony Ellis	1,373		
Labour	Raymond Emmett	1,287		
Conservative	Maureen Carter	565		
Conservative	George Daniels	521		
Conservative	Dean Fackerell	480		
Turnout				
Ind. Residents win (new seat)				
Ind. Residents win (new seat)				
Ind. Residents win (new seat)				
