= List of mayors of Havering =

The Mayor of Havering was a position first established in 1965 with the creation of the London Borough of Havering. It replaced the mayor of Romford.

The mayor is a member (Note: Councillor or alderman before 1978; councillor after 1978.) elected by Havering Council at a mayor-making ceremony in May to serve for a year, during which time they act as the borough's civic and ceremonial head.

== List of mayors ==
The title holders of Mayor of Havering are as follows:

| No. | Mayor | Took office | Left office | Deputy | Ref. |
|---|---|---|---|---|---|
| 1 | Sidney Legg | 1965 | 1966 | [data missing] | |
| 2 | Thomas Dix | 1966 | 1967 | [data missing] | |
| 3 | Bill Sibley (Note: Bill Sibley served two consecutive terms.) | 1967 | 1968 | Bill Smith (Note: Bill Smith served two consecutive terms.) | |
| 4 | Bill Sibley | 1968 | 1969 | Bill Smith | |
| 5 | Bill Smith | 1969 | 1970 | Bert James | |
| 6 | Bert James | 1970 | 1971 | Elsie Gallant | |
| 7 | Frank Coffin | 1971 | 1972 | [data missing] | |
| 8 | Bill Cole | 1972 | 1973 | [data missing] | |
| 9 | Stanley Heath-Coleman | 1973 | 1974 | [data missing] | |
| 10 | Reta Coffin | 1974 | 1975 | [data missing] | |
| 11 | Dennis Peters (Note: Dennis Peters died in office.) | 1975 | July 1975 | [data missing] | |
| 12 | Albert Davis | 14 October 1975 | 1976 | [data missing] | |
| 13 | Henry Turner | 1976 | 1977 | [data missing] | |
| 14 | Jack Moultrie | 1977 | 1978 | [data missing] | |
| 15 | Jean Frost | 1978 | 1979 | [data missing] | |
| 16 | Alice Smith | 1979 | 1980 | [data missing] | |
| 17 | Peter Marsden | 1980 | 1981 | [data missing] | |
| 18 | Leslie Reilly | 1981 | 1982 | [data missing] | |
| 19 | Norman Symonds | 1982 | 1983 | [data missing] | |
| 20 | Winifred Whitlingham | 1983 | 1984 | [data missing] | |
| 21 | Bill Todd | 1984 | 1985 | [data missing] | |
| 22 | Eric Munday (Note: Eric Munday was also the mayor for 2012/2013.) | 1985 | 1986 | [data missing] | |
| 23 | Roy Knell | 1986 | 1987 | Robin Adaire | |
| 24 | Robin Adaire | 1987 | 1988 | [data missing] | |
| 25 | Louise Sinclair (Note: Louise Sinclair was also the mayor for 2004/2005.) | 1988 | 1989 | [data missing] | |
| 26 | Tom Orrin | 1989 | 1990 | [data missing] | |
| 27 | Ron Latchford | 1990 | 1991 | [data missing] | |
| 28 | Dennis O'Flynn | 1991 | 1992 | [data missing] | |
| 29 | Len Long | 1992 | 1993 | [data missing] | |
| 30 | Mary Edwards | 1993 | 1994 | [data missing] | |
| 31 | Jack Hoepleman (Note: Jack Hoepleman served two consecutive terms.) | 1994 | 1995 | [data missing] | |
| 32 | Jack Hoepleman | 1995 | 1996 | David Parker-Ross | |
| 33 | Ivor Cameron | 1996 | 1997 | [data missing] | |
| 34 | Del Smith | 1997 | 1998 | [data missing] | |
| 35 | Harry Webb | 1998 | 1999 | [data missing] | |
| 36 | Maisie Whitelock | 1999 | 2000 | Brian Eagling | |
| 37 | Brian Eagling (Note: Brian Eagling was also the mayor for 2015/2016.) | 2000 | 2001 | [data missing] | |
| 38 | Dennis O'Flynn | 2001 | 2002 | [data missing] | |
| 39 | Peter Gardner | 2002 | 2003 | [data missing] | |
| 40 | Edward Cahill | 2003 | 2004 | [data missing] | |
| 41 | Louise Sinclair (Note: Louise Sinclair was also the mayor for 1998/1999.) | 2004 | 2005 | [data missing] | |
| 42 | John Mylod (Note: John Mylod was also the mayor for 2020/2021 and 2021/2022.) | 2005 | 2006 | Dennis O'Flynn | |
| 43 | Wendy Brice-Thompson | 2006 | 2007 | Georgina Galpin | |
| 44 | Georgina Galpin | 2007 | 2008 | John Clark | |
| 45 | John Clark | 2008 | 2009 | Pam Light | |
| 46 | Roger Ramsey | 2009 | 2010 | Melvin Wallace (Note: Melvin Wallace served two consecutive terms.) | |
| 47 | Pam Light | 2010 | 2011 | Melvin Wallace | |
| 48 | Melvin Wallace | 2011 | 2012 | Lynden Thorpe | |
| 49 | Lynden Thorpe | 2012 | 2013 | Eric Munday | |
| 50 | Eric Munday (Note: Eric Munday was also the mayor for 1985/1986.) | 2013 | 2014 | Linda Trew | |
| 51 | Linda Trew | 2014 | 2015 | Barbara Matthews | |
| 52 | Brian Eagling (Note: Brian Eagling was also the mayor for 2000/2002.) | 2015 | 2016 | Philippa Crowder | |
| 53 | Philippa Crowder | 2016 | 2017 | Linda Van den Hende | |
| 54 | Linda Van den Hende | 2017 | 2018 | Dilip Patel | |
| 55 | Dilip Patel | 2018 | 2019 | Michael Deon Burton | |
| 56 | Michael Deon Burton | 2019 | 2020 | John Mylod | |
| 57 | John Mylod (Note: John Mylod was also the mayor for 2005/2006 and 2021/2022.) | 2020 | 2021 | Christine Vickery (Note: Christine Vickery served two consecutive terms.) | |
| 58 | John Mylod (Note: John Mylod was also the mayor for 2005/2006 and 2020/2021.) | 2021 | 2022 | Christine Vickery | |
| 59 | Trevor McKeever | 2022 | 2023 | Stephanie Nunn | |
| 60 | Stephanie Nunn | 2023 | 2024 | Patricia Brown | |
| 61 | Gerry O'Sullivan | 2024 | 2025 | Sue Ospreay | |
| 62 | Sue Ospreay | 2025 | 2026 | Barry Mugglestone | |
| 63 | Maggie Themistocli | 2026 | 2027 | Christine Vickery | |
