= Keith Darvill =

British politician (born 1948)

Member of Parliament for Upminster
- In office 1 May 1997 – 14 May 2001
- Preceded by: Nicholas Bonsor
- Succeeded by: Angela Watkinson

Member of Havering London Borough Council for Heaton
- In office 2 May 2002 – 7 May 2026
- Preceded by: Ken Clark
- Succeeded by: Iurie Bivol

Personal details
- Born: Keith Ernest Darvill; 28 May 1948 (age 78) London, England, UK
- Party: Labour
- Spouse: Julia
- Children: 3
- Education: Norlington School
- Alma mater: Polytechnic of Central London

Keith Ernest Darvill (born 28 May 1948) is a British Labour Party politician. He served as Member of Parliament (MP) for Upminster from 1997 to 2001, and as a councillor in the London Borough of Havering from 2002 to 2026.

== Early life ==
Darvill was educated at Norlington School in the London Borough of Waltham Forest, in East London and at the Polytechnic of Central London school of Law after which he worked as a solicitor.

== Member of Parliament ==
Darvill was elected as Labour Member of Parliament for Upminster at the 1997 election, taking it from the Conservatives, and was one of the few Labour MPs to lose their seat at the 2001 election to the Conservatives.

Darvill stood once again in Upminster, Labour's sixth target, at the May 2005 general election, but failed to regain the seat.

== Havering politics ==
Darvill was elected to Havering Council from the ward of Heaton at the 2002 election. He unsuccessfully stood for the London Assembly seat of Havering and Redbridge at the 2004 election. He was narrowly re-elected at the 2006 election when Labour was almost wiped out in the borough.

Following the 2010 election Labour increased its council group to 5 and Darvill was elected Labour group leader on the council. As a result of the 2022 election Darvill retained his role as leader of the Labour group and was appointed cabinet member for climate change as part of a coalition deal he helped to negotiate between the Labour Party and the Havering Residents Association. The coalition collapsed in 2024.

Darvill lost his seat on Havering London Borough Council to Reform UK at the 2026 election.

== Personal life ==
He lives in Upminster with his wife Julia, he has three children and seven grandchildren.

Parliament of the United Kingdom
Preceded by Sir Nicholas Bonsor	Member of Parliament for Upminster; 1997–2001	Succeeded by Angela Watkinson
