= Keith Prince =

British politician

Cllr Keith Prince AM
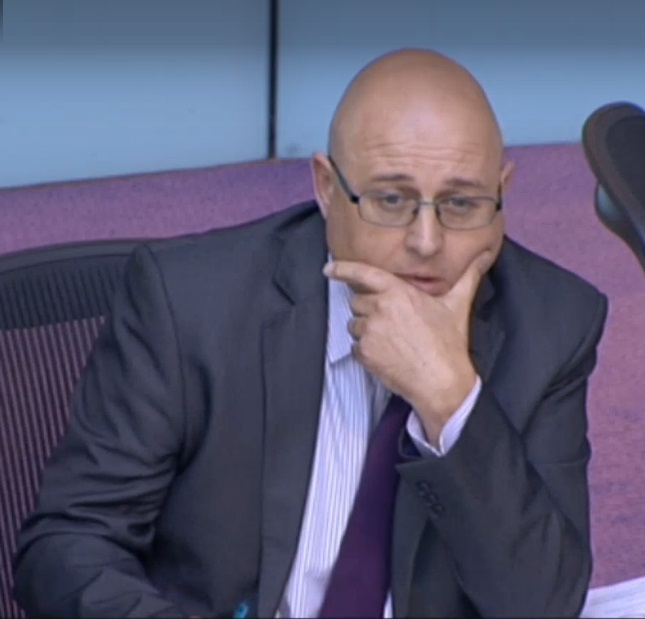
- Prince in 2018

Leader of Havering London Borough Council
- Incumbent
- Assumed office 27 May 2026
- Deputy: Sue Benjamins
- Preceded by: Ray Morgon

Leader of Redbridge London Borough Council
- In office 28 May 2009 – 22 May 2014
- Preceded by: Alan Weinberg
- Succeeded by: Jas Athwal

Member of the London Assembly for Havering and Redbridge
- Incumbent
- Assumed office 7 May 2016
- Preceded by: Roger Evans
- Majority: 15,476 (9.0%)

Member of Havering London Borough Council
- Incumbent
- Assumed office 7 May 2026
- Preceded by: Patricia Brown
- Constituency: Gooshays
- In office 5 May 2022 – 7 May 2026
- Succeeded by: Tom Vickery
- Constituency: Squirrels Heath
- In office 3 May 1990 – 5 May 1994
- Preceded by: David Forster
- Succeeded by: Valerie Evans
- Constituency: Gidea Park

Member of Redbridge London Borough Council for Barkingside
- In office 10 April 2003 – 3 May 2018
- Preceded by: Keith Axon
- Succeeded by: Mohammed Noor

Leader of Reform UK in the London Borough of Havering
- Incumbent
- Assumed office 4 October 2025
- Preceded by: Office established

Leader of Havering Conservatives
- In office 23 May 2023 – 20 January 2025
- Preceded by: Damian White
- Succeeded by: Michael White

Personal details
- Born: September 1958 (age 68) Elm Park, Hornchurch, Essex, England
- Party: Reform UK (since 2025)
- Other political affiliations: Conservative (until 2025)
- Occupation: Politician

Keith Anthony Prince (born September 1958) is a British Reform UK politician who has served as leader of Havering London Borough Council since May 2026, and as Member of the London Assembly (AM) for Havering and Redbridge since 2016. He previously served as leader of Redbridge London Borough Council from 2009 to 2014.

== Background ==
Prince was born and raised in Havering before moving to Redbridge. Before entering politics, Prince was a marketing manager and worked for LBC Radio. He was later an advisor to Deputy Mayor for Policing and Crime Stephen Greenhalgh.

== Political career ==
Prince served as a Conservative Party councillor on Havering London Borough Council from 1990, representing Gidea Park ward, before being defeated by the Residents Association in 1994. He was elected as a councillor on Redbridge London Borough Council for the Barkingside ward from 2003 until 2018, serving as leader of the council between 2009 and 2014, in coalition with the Liberal Democrats after May 2010. In 2014 Labour won control of Redbridge Council which consigned Prince to opposition.

In 2016, Prince stood to become the Conservative candidate for the London Assembly seat of Havering and Redbridge, after the retirement of the incumbent, Roger Evans. Prince was elected as the assembly member in May 2016 with a majority of 1,438, and re-elected in the 2021 and 2024 elections with majorities of 15,327 and 15,476 respectively.

In 2017, Prince had a heated row with a fellow passenger during his daily Dartford-to-London commute on the Southeastern train service. The confrontation was filmed and was reported on social media and in print and broadcast media. Prince subsequently stated that "I'd like to apologise to my fellow commuters for the disturbance our initial disagreement caused."

In 2022, Prince was elected as a councillor on Havering Council for the Squirrels Heath ward with a majority of 1,207. In May 2023 he was elected as leader of the Havering Conservatives. He resigned from the position in January 2025.

In 2023, Prince was re-selected as the Conservative candidate for the Havering and Redbridge constituency in the 2024 London Assembly election, in which he was re-elected with a majority of 15,476.

On 4 October 2025, Prince defected from the Conservative Party to join Reform UK. In the 2026 Havering London Borough Council election, he was elected as councillor for the Gooshays ward. Reform UK won control of the council, and Prince was appointed leader of the new Reform UK administration.
