= Harold Wood Hill Park Residents Association =

British political party

- Abbreviation: HWHPRA
- Leader: Darren Wise
- Registered: 2009
- Headquarters: 20 Tindall Close, Romford, RM3 0PB
- Ideology: Localism
- Political position: Big tent
- Havering London Borough Council: 3 / 55

Website
- hwhpra.org.uk

Harold Wood Hill Park Residents Association (HWHPRA) is a local political party based in the London Borough of Havering. The party was formerly affiliated with the Havering Residents Association, but is now independent. It has held representation for the Harold Wood ward on Havering London Borough Council since 2010.

== History ==
Harold Wood Hill Park Residents Association was registered as a political party in 2009. It covers the Harold Wood, Harold Hill and Harold Park areas.

At the 2010 Havering London Borough Council election, the party won one of three seats in the Harold Wood ward. At the 2014 election, they won all three seats. The three elected councillors formed, with some residents association members from other wards, the 'East Havering Residents Group' on Havering Council. This group then formed a leadership coalition with the Conservatives.

At the 2018 election, the party won three seats in the Harold Wood ward. In 2019, Harold Wood Hill Park Residents Association ceased to be associated with the Havering Residents Association and the party registration was updated to include 'independent' as part of registered emblems and descriptions.

At the 2022 election, the party won three seats in Harold Wood ward. At this election the Havering Residents Association also stood candidates. The HWHPRA councillors sit as the 'East Havering Residents Group' on Havering Council.
