= Havering London Borough Council =

London borough council

- Coat of arms

- Council logo

Type
- Type: London borough council of the London Borough of Havering
- Houses: Unicameral

History
- Founded: 1 April 1965

Leadership
- Mayor: Maggie Themistocli, Reform since 27 May 2026
- Leader: Keith Prince, Reform since 27 May 2026
- Chief Executive: Andrew Blake-Herbert since 31 March 2016

Structure
- Seats: 55 councillors
- Political groups: Administration (39) Reform (39) Opposition (16) Havering Aligned Residents' Associations (11) Upminster & Cranham Residents Association (6) Hornchurch Residents Association (4) Havering Residents Association (1) East Havering Residents' Group (3) Labour (2)
- Committees: 7: Adjudication and Review; Audit; Governance; Highways Advisory; Licensing; Pensions; Regulatory Services
- Joint committees: Thames Chase Joint Committee; Thames Gateway London Partnership; East London Waste Authority; London Councils
- Length of term: Whole council elected every four years

Elections
- Voting system: Plurality at-large (FPTP)
- Last election: 7 May 2026
- Next election: 2030

Motto
- Liberty

Meeting place
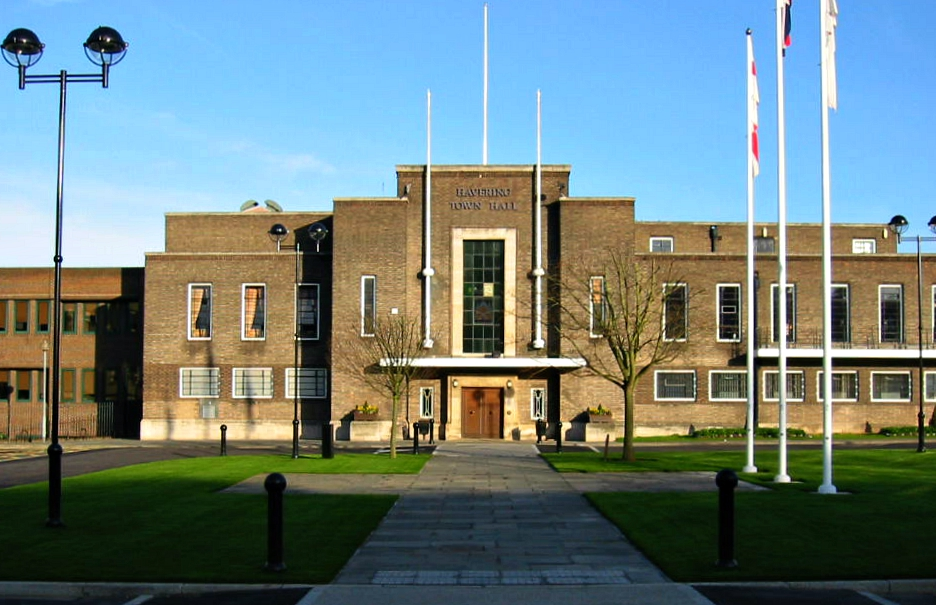
- Havering Town Hall, Main Road, Romford, RM1 3BB

Website
- www.havering.gov.uk

Constitution
- Constitution

Havering London Borough Council, also known as Havering Council, is the local authority for the London Borough of Havering in Greater London, England, based at Havering Town Hall in Romford. The council is responsible for providing a range of services within the borough.

The council is controlled by Reform UK, who won a majority in the 2026 election.

== History ==
The London Borough of Havering and its council were created under the London Government Act 1963, with the first election held in 1964. For its first year the council acted as a shadow authority alongside the area's two outgoing authorities, being the borough council of Romford and the urban district council of Hornchurch. The new council formally came into its powers on 1 April 1965, at which point the old districts and their councils were abolished. The council's full legal name is "The Mayor and Burgesses of the London Borough of Havering".

From 1965 until 1986 the council was a lower-tier authority, with upper-tier functions provided by the Greater London Council. The split of powers and functions meant that the Greater London Council was responsible for "wide area" services such as fire, ambulance, flood prevention, and refuse disposal; with the boroughs (including Havering) responsible for "personal" services such as social care, libraries, cemeteries and refuse collection. As an outer London borough council Havering has been a local education authority since 1965. The Greater London Council was abolished in 1986 and its functions passed to the London Boroughs, with some services provided through joint committees.

Since 2000 the Greater London Authority has taken some responsibility for highways and planning control from the council, but within the English local government system the council remains a "most purpose" authority in terms of the available range of powers and functions.

In September 2023, the leader of the council warned the authority could be six months away from triggering a Section 114 notice because of the increasing cost of social care and housing. The council managed to set a budget in 2024, but only through relying on an exceptional £54 million loan from the government.

== Powers and functions ==
The local authority derives its powers and functions from the London Government Act 1963 and subsequent legislation, and has the powers and functions of a London borough council. It sets council tax and as a billing authority it also collects precepts for Greater London Authority functions plus levies on behalf of the East London Waste Authority, the Lee Valley Regional Park Authority and others. It sets planning policies which complement Greater London Authority and national policies, and decides on almost all planning applications accordingly. It is also the local education authority.

== Political control ==
The council had been under no overall control since 2014 until 2026, when Reform UK won full control of the Havering council. The first election was held in 1964, initially operating as a shadow authority alongside the outgoing authorities until it came into its powers on 1 April 1965. Political control of the council since 1965 has been as follows:

Party in control	Years
No overall control	1965–1968
Conservative	1968–1971
Labour	1971–1974
No overall control	1974–1978
Conservative	1978–1986
No overall control	1986–2006
Conservative	2006–2014
No overall control	2014–2026
Reform	2026–present

=== Leadership ===
The role of mayor in Havering is largely ceremonial, usually being held by a different member each year. Political leadership is instead provided by the leader of the council. The leaders since 1965 have been:

No.	Portrait	Leader	Took office	Left office	Party	Constituency
1	Jack Moultrie	Jack Moultrie	1965	1971	Conservative	Alderman (Note: Elected to Emerson Park prior to being elected alderman)
2	Michael Ward	Michael Ward	1971	1974	Labour	Alderman (Note: Elected to Heaton prior to being elected alderman)
3	Jack Moultrie	Jack Moultrie	1974	1977	Conservative	Emerson Park
4	William Sibley	William Sibley	1977	1978	Conservative	Emerson Park
5	Jack Moultrie	Jack Moultrie	1978	1984	Conservative	Emerson Park
6	Roger Ramsey	Roger Ramsey	1984	1990	Conservative	St Edward's
7	Arthur Latham	Arthur Latham	1990	1996	Labour	Brooklands
8	Louise Sinclair	Louise Sinclair	1996	1997	Residents	Cranham West
9	Wilf Mills	Wilf Mills	1997	1998	Labour	Hilldene
10	Ray Harris	Ray Harris	1998	2002	Labour	Elm Park
11	Eric Munday	Eric Munday	2002	2004	Conservative	Squirrel's Heath
12	Michael White	Michael White	2004	29 January 2014	Conservative	Squirrel's Heath
13	Steven Kelly	Steven Kelly	29 January 2014	May 2014	Conservative	Emerson Park
14	Roger Ramsey	Roger Ramsey	11 June 2014	12 May 2018	Conservative	Emerson Park
15	Damian White	Damian White	23 May 2018	May 2022	Conservative	Squirrel's Heath
16	Ray Morgon	Ray Morgon	25 May 2022	May 2026	Havering Residents Association	Hacton
17	Keith Prince	Keith Prince	27 May 2026	Incumbent	Reform	Gooshays

=== Composition ===
As of May 2026, following the 2026 election, the composition of the council is:

Party	Councillors
Reform	39
Havering Residents Association	11
Harold Wood Hill Park RA	3
Labour	2
Total	55

The next election is due in May 2030.

Following the 2022 election, the council remained under no overall control with the Conservatives remaining the largest party but still shy of a majority. After weeks of negotiations, and following Labour's rejection of a confidence and supply arrangement, a coalition arrangement was reached between the HRA and Labour which saw Ray Morgon appointed Leader of the Council with a majority HRA cabinet and a minority of Labour members. John Tyler, residents association councillor for Cranham, announced he would not join HRA Group in the weeks after the coalition was formed, stating that bringing national party politics into local government was "fundamentally against [his] principles".

In September 2022, three Conservative councillors jointly announced they were joining the HRA due to a lack of support from their party after the July wildfire in Wennington. The death of HRA councillor Linda Hawthorn in May 2023 saw a by-election in Upminster where the group kept their seat. In January 2024, Conservative councillor Robby Misir joined the HRA having criticised his former party's local leader Keith Prince over a debate about school transport. Three more Conservative councillors defected to the HRA in late April.

On 22 May 2024, at the annual meeting of the full council, the HRA elected their own councillor Gerry O'Sullivan to be the ceremonial Mayor of Havering. This came as a shock to the Labour Group which expected their outgoing Deputy Mayor Patricia Brown to be elected mayor as is tradition. Labour councillor Trevor McKeever described it as breaking the coalition agreement and local Labour leader Keith Darvill described it as a breach of trust. Patricia Brown herself said that "HRA members have demonstrated time and again over the past two years that self-service comes before working together for the benefit of residents". For its part, the HRA disagreed and stated that there was nothing on the mayoralty included in their agreement. During the meeting, Labour councillor Paul McGeary abstained on voting for Labour's candidates for the mayoralty and for the chair of the Overview and Scrutiny Board, with him defecting to the HRA just over a week later. With only Labour leader Keith Darvill left representing his party in the cabinet, the HRA decided on 3 June 2024 to end the agreement and govern as a minority administration. Darvill criticised the HRA for "populism and empty gesture petty politics". Council leader Ray Morgon told the Local Democracy Reporting Service that the end was "inevitable" but had "expected there'd be a rift next year" and Darvill similarly stated that he had "expected it".

== Elections ==
Since the last boundary changes in 2022 the council has comprised 55 councillors representing 20 wards, with each ward electing two or three councillors. Elections are held every four years.

As part of the process of reviewing the boundaries leading up to the 2022 changes, there were accusations that the Conservative administration was attempting to gerrymander the new boundaries. The council's then leader, Damian White, was secretly recorded outlining plans to modify ward boundaries to the advantage of the party. White reportedly said the Local Government Boundary Commission had so few staff it was "highly unlikely they'll put in the effort" to scrutinise the changes and that "they only look at what was discussed... at the full council meeting. So there will be only one option." Following the emergence of the recording there was a local outcry. The Local Government Boundary Commission consequently revised its proposals for the new wards and carried out further public consultation, which led to notable changes in the final boundaries from the earlier draft proposals.

== Premises ==
The council is based at Havering Town Hall on Main Road in Romford, which was completed in 1937 as 'Romford Town Hall' for the old Romford Urban District Council. It was formally opened on 16 September 1937, on which day Romford was also presented with its charter of incorporation turning the urban district into a borough. The building was subsequently extended in 1960 and 1988. In May 2024, the town hall experienced an arson attack, damaging the property but not leading to any injuries or loss of data.

== Cabinet ==
As of May 2026, the composition of the Havering Council cabinet is as follows.

Party key	Reform

Post	Councillor	Ward
Leader of the Council	Keith Prince	Gooshays
Deputy Leader of the Council; Cabinet Member for Finance	Sue Benjamins	Mawneys
Cabinet Member for Planning and Public Protection	Terry Brown	St Edward's
Cabinet Member for Public Realm	Martynas Cekavicius	Squirrels Heath
Cabinet Member for Adults and Health Care	Graham Day	Mawneys
Cabinet Member for Children	Kevin Gill	Hylands and Harrow Lodge
Cabinet Member for Housing Allocation	Martin Lardner	St Edward's
Cabinet Member for Customer Services	Sean McMahon	Hylands and Harrow Lodge
Cabinet Member for Highways	Alex Sibley	Emerson Park
Cabinet Member for Regeneration	Robert Whitton	Gooshays
