= 1990 Havering London Borough Council election =

1990 local election in England

← 1986	3 May 1990	1994 →

All 63 Havering London Borough Council seats 32 seats needed for a majority
- Registered: 180,143
- Turnout: 88,523, 49.14%

	First party	Second party
Party	Labour	Conservative
Seats before	24	26
Seats won	25 (Note: Results include those from candidates listed under the Labour and Co-operative Party)	19
Seat change	▲1	▼7
Popular vote	90,303	75,762
Percentage	41.71%	34.99%
	Third party	Fourth party
Party	Residents	Liberal Democrats
Seats before	10	3
Seats won	13	6 (Note: Results include those from candidates listed under Liberal Democratic Focus Team and Liberal Democratic Hotline Team designations)
Seat change	▲3	▲3
Popular vote	28,244	16,634
Percentage	13.05%	7.68%
Council control before election
No Overall Control
Council control after election
No Overall Control

The 1990 Havering Council election took place on 3 May 1990 to elect members of Havering London Borough Council in London, England. The whole council was up for election and the council stayed in no overall control.

== Electoral arrangements ==
The 1990 election used the ward boundaries established in 1978 for the fourth time. 63 councillors were elected from 25 wards. Each ward returned two or three councillors.

Polling took place on 3 May 1990.

== Results ==
Labour replaced the Conservatives as the largest group on the council, six seats short of a majority. The Conservatives gained two seats from the Liberal Democrats in Chase Cross ward and three seats went the other way in Harold Wood. Labour gained two seats from the Conservatives in Collier Row, two seats in Hylands and one seat in Oldchurch. Residents gained three seats in Upminster from the Conservatives. This gave the Labour Party 25 councillors, the Conservative Party 19, the Residents Association 13 and the Liberal Democrats 6 councillors.

The council remained in no overall control.

1990 Havering London Borough Council election
Party	Seats	Gains	Losses	Net gain/loss	Seats %	Votes %	Votes	+/−
Labour	25	5	4	▲1	39.68	41.71	90,303	
Conservative	19	4	11	▼7	30.16	34.99	75,762	
Residents	13	3	0	▲3	20.64	13.05	28,244	
Liberal Democrats	6	3	0	▲3	9.52	7.68	16,634	
SDP	0	0	0	Steady	0.0	1.15	2,492	
Independent	0	0	0	Steady	0.0	0.76	1,640	
Green	0	0	0	Steady	0.0	0.36	785	
Ind. Conservative	0	0	0	Steady	0.0	0.17	374	
Friends of Rainham Marshes	0	0	0	Steady	0.0	0.13	271	
Total	63						216,505	

== Ward results ==
(*) - Indicates an incumbent candidate

(†) - Indicates an incumbent candidate who is running in a different ward

=== Airfield ===
Airfield (3)
Party	Candidate	Votes	%
Labour	Raymond F. Emmett*	2,056	58.31
Labour	Christopher W. Purnell	1,978	
Labour	May Whitelock	1,913	
Conservative	Patricia A. Dregent	1,088	30.92
Conservative	Peter B. McComish	1,035	
Conservative	Dominic N. Swan	1,031	
Lib Dem Hotline Team	Maureen Little	385	10.77
Lib Dem Hotline Team	Carol A. Gaspard	371	
Lib Dem Hotline Team	Bernadette A. Oddy	342	
Registered electors		7,728	
Turnout		3,613	46.75
Rejected ballots		4	0.11
Labour hold			
Labour hold			
Labour hold			

=== Ardleigh Green ===
Ardleigh Green (2)
Party	Candidate	Votes	%
Conservative	Peter C. Gardner*	1,549	55.52
Conservative	Ronald F. Latchford*	1,517	
Labour	Robert C. Kirchner	884	30.93
Labour	Kevin R. Robinson	823	
Liberal Democrats	John E. Hewitt	404	13.55
Liberal Democrats	Helen J. Tegg	344	
Registered electors		6,363	
Turnout		2,903	45.62
Rejected ballots		8	0.28
Conservative hold			
Conservative hold			

=== Brooklands ===
Brooklands (2)
Party	Candidate	Votes	%
Labour	Arthur Latham*	1,415	43.24
Conservative	Henry A. Tebbutt Snr.*	1,404	45.16
Conservative	Michael J. White	1,320	
Labour Co-op	Sheila A. McCole	1,193	
Green	Anthony J. Edwards	350	11.60
Registered electors		5,731	
Turnout		2,987	52.12
Rejected ballots		5	0.17
Labour gain from Conservative			
Conservative gain from Labour			

=== Chase Cross ===
Chase Cross (2)
Party	Candidate	Votes	%	±%
Conservative	Andrew Rosindell	1,472	46.98	
Conservative	Cyril North	1,375		
Labour	Pauline Koseda	949	31.11	
Labour	Dennis Cook	937		
Liberal Democrats	Paul Einchcomb* (Note: replaced Eric Freeman as councillor after his death in 1988)	683	21.91	
Liberal Democrats	Terry Hurlstone	645		
Registered electors		5,670		
Turnout		3,159	55.71	
Rejected ballots		4	0.13	
Conservative gain from Liberal Democrats		Swing		
Conservative gain from Liberal Democrats		Swing		

=== Collier Row ===
Collier Row (2)
Party	Candidate	Votes	%
Labour	Stefan F. Koseda	1,406	50.77
Labour	Patrick D. Ridley	1,374	
Conservative	Robin Adaire*	1,373	49.23
Conservative	Patrick C. Curtin*	1,322	
Registered electors		5,805	
Turnout		2,882	49.65
Rejected ballots		12	0.42
Labour gain from Conservative			
Labour gain from Conservative			

=== Cranham East ===
Cranham East (2)
Party	Candidate	Votes	%
Residents	Rowland J.C. Knell*	1,489	48.51
Residents	William A. Remfry*	1,320	
Labour	Arthur T. Booton	926	30.77
Labour	Colin Lowry	855	
Conservative	Grace C. Cudby	652	20.72
Conservative	Doris Hullyer	547	
Registered electors		5,723	
Turnout		3,083	53.87
Rejected ballots		1	0.03
Residents hold			
Residents hold			

=== Cranham West ===
Cranham West (2)
Party	Candidate	Votes	%
Residents	Louisa G. Sinclair*	1,953	60.11
Residents	Diane E. Jenkin	1,862	
Conservative	Frank C. Hullyer	742	23.13
Conservative	David R.A. Perreira	725	
Labour	Thomas G. Horlock	572	16.76
Labour	George W. Saunders	492	
Registered electors		5,637	
Turnout		3,265	57.92
Rejected ballots		2	0.06
Residents hold			
Residents hold			

=== Elm Park ===
Elm Park (3)
Party	Candidate	Votes	%
Labour	Jack Hoepelman^{†} (Note: Jack was originally a councillor for the Airfield ward)	2,592	50.93
Labour	Michael J. Lucas*	2,588	
Labour	Howard P. Moss	2,348	
Conservative	Derrick E. Weaver	1,504	29.78
Conservative	Patricia Field	1,469	
Conservative	Ronald E.C. Woods	1,429	
Independent	Graham K. Williamson	950	19.29
Registered electors		9,096	
Turnout		4,700	51.67
Rejected ballots		20	0.43
Labour hold			
Labour hold			
Labour hold			

=== Emerson Park ===
Emerson Park (2)
Party	Candidate	Votes	%
Conservative	Roger E. Ramsey*	2,119	62.27
Conservative	Kenneth W. Roe*	1,947	
Labour	Joseph T. Moore	865	26.19
Labour	Gordon V.E. Thompson	845	
Liberal Democrats	Albert E. Rabone	379	11.55
Liberal Democrats	John C. Porter	375	
Registered electors		7,105	
Turnout		3,423	48.18
Rejected ballots		10	0.29
Conservative hold			
Conservative hold			

=== Gidea Park ===
Gidea Park (2)
Party	Candidate	Votes	%
Conservative	Alice Smith*	1,519	51.08
Conservative	Keith Prince	1,508	
Labour	Francis Bland	785	25.64
Labour	Martin O'Donnell	734	
Independent	Ian Wilkes	690	23.28
Registered electors		5,695	
Turnout		2,838	49.83
Rejected ballots		2	0.07
Conservative hold			
Conservative hold			

=== Gooshays ===
Gooshays (3)
Party	Candidate	Votes	%
Labour	Sean L. Willis	2,440	71.96
Labour	William G. Harrison	2,418	
Labour	Michael P. Davis^{†} (Note: Michael was originally a councillor for the Mawney ward)	2,401	
Conservative	Martin Davis	1,036	28.04
Conservative	Eileen Rosindell	903	
Conservative	Jacqueline Tebbutt	890	
Registered electors		8,029	
Turnout		3,783	47.12
Rejected ballots		23	0.61
Labour hold			
Labour hold			
Labour hold			

=== Hacton ===
Hacton (3)
Party	Candidate	Votes	%
Residents	Barbara Reith*	1,755	41.33
Residents	Ivor J. Cameron	1,713	
Residents	Kevin V. Walland	1,629	
Labour	William Howard	1,419	34.10
Labour	David C. Burn	1,413	
Labour	Ernest J. Rawlins	1,375	
Conservative	Kathleen W. Jewell	1,028	24.57
Conservative	Eric W. Nicholls	1,026	
Conservative	Edwin C. Singleton	976	
Registered electors		8,558	
Turnout		4,372	51.09
Rejected ballots		1	0.02
Residents hold			
Residents hold			
Residents hold			

=== Harold Wood ===
Harold Wood (3)
Party	Candidate	Votes	%
Lib Dem Focus Team	John K. Wilson	2,049	46.27
Lib Dem Focus Team	Mark G. Wilson	2,041	
Lib Dem Focus Team	Kevyn M. Jones	1,974	
Conservative	Pamela M. Light*	1,324	29.23
Conservative	Godfrey J. Webster	1,260	
Conservative	Marjorie F. Ramsey	1,247	
Labour	Jennifer G. Hague	1,095	24.50
Labour	Dereck A. Smith	1,064	
Labour	Barry L. Nottage	1,052	
Registered electors		8,009	
Turnout		4,533	56.60
Rejected ballots		3	0.07
Lib Dem Focus Team gain from Conservative			
Lib Dem Focus Team gain from Conservative			
Lib Dem Focus Team gain from Conservative			

=== Heath Park ===
Heath Park (2)
Party	Candidate	Votes	%
Conservative	Mary Edwards*	1,767	60.68
Conservative	Eric A. Munday*	1,721	
Labour	Diane Tomlinson	1,173	39.32
Labour Co-op	Jeannette M. Bowyer	1,086	
Registered electors		6,565	
Turnout		3,078	46.88
Rejected ballots		18	0.58
Conservative hold			
Conservative hold			

=== Heaton ===
Heaton (3)
Party	Candidate	Votes	%
Labour	Ruby M. Latham*	2,529	73.35
Labour	Denis R. O'Flynn*	2,465	
Labour	Geoffrey E. Otter*	2,380	
Conservative	David Ratcliffe	928	26.65
Conservative	Clive J. Milton	922	
Conservative	Dirk P. Russell	828	
Registered electors		8,862	
Turnout		3,750	42.32
Rejected ballots		18	0.48
Labour hold			
Labour hold			
Labour hold			

=== Hilldene ===
Hilldene (3)
Party	Candidate	Votes	%
Labour	Mark A. Flewitt	2,178	73.88
Labour	Wilfrid C. Mills^{†} (Note: Wilfrid was originally a councillor representing the Gooshays ward)	2,154	
Labour	Anthony M. Hunt	2,151	
Conservative	Henry A. Tebbutt Jnr	774	26.12
Conservative	David Lel	766	
Conservative	Roy White	751	
Registered electors		6,533	
Turnout		3,075	47.07
Rejected ballots		20	0.65
Labour hold			
Labour hold			
Labour hold			

=== Hylands ===
Hylands (3)
Party	Candidate	Votes	%	±%
Labour	Graham Carr	1,838	44.06	
Labour	Michael Flynn	1,816		
Labour	Raymond Shaw	1,776		
Conservative	Stephen Evans	1,616	38.39	
Conservative	Olive Baruch	1,588		
Conservative	William Jones	1,528		
SDP	Margery Ford	466	8.45	
SDP	Terence Matthews	466		
Ind. Conservative	Alan Cash	374	9.10	
SDP	Alan Ryan	108		
Registered electors		8,808		
Turnout		4,159	47.22	
Rejected ballots		5	0.12	
Labour gain from Conservative		Swing		
Labour hold		Swing		
Labour gain from Conservative		Swing		

=== Mawney ===
Mawney (3)
Party	Candidate	Votes	%
Labour	Robert S. Kilbey	1,915	43.40
Labour	Lorna McLeish	1,909	
Conservative	Cyril Field*	1,833	39.48
Labour	Paul F. Stygal	1,825	
Conservative	Dennis S. Holmes	1,703	
Conservative	Michael J. Robinson	1,602	
SDP	Geoffrey A. Howard	573	11.15
SDP	Pamela Offen	466	
SDP	Francis W. Thompson	413	
Green	Kevin J. Osborne	259	5.97
Registered electors		8,746	
Turnout		4,381	50.09
Rejected ballots		3	0.07
Labour gain from Conservative			
Labour hold			
Conservative gain from Labour			

=== Oldchurch ===
Oldchurch (2)
Party	Candidate	Votes	%
Labour	Tony L. Gordon	1,110	48.96
Labour Co-op	Tony Rew*	919	
Conservative	Derek G. Price*	735	33.38
Conservative	Ralph Pritty	649	
Residents	Michael A. Winter	366	17.66
Registered electors		5,001	
Turnout		2,090	41.79
Rejected ballots		1	0.05
Labour hold			
Labour Co-op gain from Conservative			

=== Rainham ===
Rainham (3)
Party	Candidate	Votes	%
Lib Dem Hotline Team	Brian F. Kent* (Note: These two councillors replaced Cllr. Mary Ball and Cllr. Laraine S. Saunders after their resignations in 1989)	1,976	45.98
Lib Dem Hotline Team	Barry J. Oddy*	1,965	
Lib Dem Hotline Team	Thomas Parker	1,887	
Labour	Patricia A. Emmitt	1,522	34.82
Labour	Harry A. Webb	1,464	
Labour	Christine A. Watson	1,428	
Conservative	Janet Prince	510	11.81
Conservative	Hazel Tebbutt	494	
Conservative	Linda White	494	
Green	Frederick J. Gibson	176	4.17
Friends of Rainham Marshes	Rosalyn J. Jenkins	152	3.22
Friends of Rainham Marshes	Raymond S. Purse	119	
Registered electors		9,253	
Turnout		4,243	45.86
Rejected ballots		2	0.05
Lib Dem Hotline Team hold			
Lib Dem Hotline Team hold			
Lib Dem Hotline Team hold			

=== Rise Park ===
Rise Park (2)
Party	Candidate	Votes	%
Conservative	Christopher J. Kemp*	1,394	50.42
Conservative	Norman F. Symonds*	1,394	
Labour	Neil W. Brindley	983	34.86
Labour	Pamela J. Craig	945	
Liberal Democrats	John F. Deeks	407	14.72
Liberal Democrats	Rosalyn J. Einchcomb	407	
Registered electors		5,968	
Turnout		2,912	48.79
Rejected ballots		2	0.07
Conservative hold			
Conservative hold			

=== St Andrew's ===
St Andrew's (3)
Party	Candidate	Votes	%	±%
Conservative	Dennis Bull	1,555		
Conservative	Pauline Orrin	1,459		
Conservative	Thomas Orrin	1,440		
Residents	Cynthia Matthews	1,328		
Residents	Ian Grimble	1,320		
Labour	Georgina Carr	1,294		
Residents	Graham Watkins	1,276		
Labour	Keith Dutton	1,254		
Labour	Benjamin Norwin	1,184		
Turnout				
Conservative hold		Swing		
Conservative hold		Swing		
Conservative hold		Swing		

=== St Edward's ===
St Edward's (2)
Party	Candidate	Votes	%
Conservative	Lydia S.E. Hutton*	1,272	57.77
Conservative	Ann E. Cockerton*	1,225	
Labour	Michael P. Hann	940	42.23
Labour Co-op	John M. Bowyer	885	
Registered electors		5,075	
Turnout		2,343	46.17
Rejected ballots		17	0.73
Conservative hold			
Conservative hold			

=== South Hornchurch ===
South Hornchurch (3)
Party	Candidate	Votes	%
Residents	Leonard F. Long*	2,227	51.31
Residents	Roger W. Newnham*	2,016	
Residents	Reginald Whitney*	1,939	
Labour	Alan Fenn	1,332	32.21
Labour	Sylvia J. Harrison	1,293	
Labour	Linda M. Pearce	1,257	
Conservative	Leslie F. Adler	662	16.48
Registered electors		8,746	
Turnout		3,957	45.24
Rejected ballots		7	0.18
Residents hold			
Residents hold			
Residents hold			

=== Upminster ===
Upminster (3)
Party	Candidate	Votes	%
Residents	Owen H.I. Ware	2,076	43.36
Residents	Linda R. Hawthorn	1,999	
Residents	Muriel P. Mylod	1,976	
Conservative	Frank J. Everett	1,947	41.66
Conservative	Bruce Gordon-Picking*	1,937	
Conservative	Norman F. Kemble*	1,931	
Labour	Stuart Brittain	719	14.98
Labour	Keith E. Darvill	705	
Labour	Margaret Hoepelman	667	
Registered electors		8,443	
Turnout		4,768	56.47
Rejected ballots		8	0.17
Residents gain from Conservative			
Residents gain from Conservative			
Residents gain from Conservative			

== By-elections ==
The following by-elections took place between the 1990 and 1994 elections:

- 1991 Gooshays by-election
- 1992 Hilldene by-election
- 1992 Gidea Park by-election
- 1992 Cranham East by-election
