= Cranham West (ward) =

- Former electoral ward for the Havering London Borough Council
- Cranham West ward boundaries from 1978 to 2002
- Borough: Havering
- County: Greater London
- Population: 7,200 (1990 estimate)
- Electorate: 6,008 (1978); 5,998 (1982); 5,930 (1986); 5,637 (1990); 5,491 (1994); 5,467 (1998)
- Major settlements: Cranham and Upminster
- Area: 3.04 square kilometres (1.17 sq mi)

Former electoral ward
- Created: 1978
- Abolished: 2002
- Councillors: 2
- Created from: Cranham
- Replaced by: Cranham
- ONS code: 02BBFG

Cranham West was an electoral ward in the London Borough of Havering from 1978 to 2002. The ward was first used in the 1978 elections and last used at the 1998 elections. It returned two councillors to Havering London Borough Council. It was replaced by the Cranham ward.

== List of councillors ==
Term	Councillor	Party
1978–1990	Ron Ower	Residents
1978–2002	Louisa Sinclair	Residents
1990–1994	Diane Jenkin	Residents
1994–2002	Joan Lewis	Residents

== Havering council elections ==
=== 1998 election ===
The election on 7 May 1998 took place on the same day as the 1998 Greater London Authority referendum.

1998 Havering London Borough Council election: Cranham West (2)
Party	Candidate	Votes	%	±%
Residents	Louisa Sinclair	2,095		
Residents	Joan Lewis	1,997		
Labour	Tom Horlock	325		
Labour	Henry Miller	319		
Conservative	Jean Curtin	248		
Conservative	Patrick Curtin	239		
Liberal Democrats	Elizabeth Thomas	34		
Liberal Democrats	Michael Thomas	16		
Turnout				
Majority				
Residents hold		Swing		
Residents hold		Swing		

=== 1994 election ===
The election took place on 5 May 1994.

1994 Havering London Borough Council election: Cranham West (2)
Party	Candidate	Votes	%	±%
Residents	Louisa Sinclair	2,272		
Residents	Joan Lewis	2,054		
Conservative	Martin Davis	497		
Labour	Tom Horlock	430		
Labour	Lesley Wheaton	388		
Turnout				
Majority				
Residents hold		Swing		
Residents hold		Swing		

=== 1990 election ===
The election took place on 3 May 1990.

1990 Havering London Borough Council election: Cranham West (2)
Party	Candidate	Votes	%	±%
Residents	Louisa Sinclair	1,953		
Residents	Diane Jenkin	1,862		
Conservative	Frank Hullyer	742		
Conservative	David Perreira	725		
Labour	Thomas Horlock	572		
Labour	George Saunders	492		
Turnout				
Majority				
Residents hold		Swing		
Residents hold		Swing		

=== 1986 election ===
The election took place on 8 May 1986.

1986 Havering London Borough Council election: Cranham West (2)
Party	Candidate	Votes	%	±%
Ind. Ratepayers	Ron Ower	1,763		
Ind. Ratepayers	Louisa Sinclair	1,763		
Conservative	Bernard Boakes	790		
Conservative	David Perreira	681		
Labour	Marjorie Ville	253		
Labour	Jennifer Hague	249		
Alliance	Martin Flower	197		
Alliance	Joan Holt	158		
Turnout				
Majority				
Ind. Ratepayers hold		Swing		
Ind. Ratepayers hold		Swing		

=== 1982 election ===
The election took place on 6 May 1982.

1982 Havering London Borough Council election: Cranham West (2)
Party	Candidate	Votes	%	±%
Ind. Ratepayers	Louisa Sinclair	1,687		
Ind. Ratepayers	Ron Ower	1,671		
Conservative	Owen Collins	1,031		
Conservative	Marigold Reilly	875		
Alliance	Ralph Gordon	295		
Labour	Dereck Marston	188		
Labour	Edward Reeder	180		
Turnout				
Majority				
Ind. Ratepayers hold		Swing		
Ind. Ratepayers hold		Swing		

=== 1978 election ===
The election took place on 4 May 1978.

1978 Havering London Borough Council election: Cranham West (2)
Party	Candidate	Votes	%	±%
Ind. Ratepayers	Ron Ower	1,824		
Ind. Ratepayers	Louisa Sinclair	1,811		
Conservative	Mary Noyes	988		
Conservative	John Smith	877		
Labour	Susan Kortlandt	239		
Labour	Helena Cowin	230		
Turnout				
Majority				
Ind. Ratepayers win (new seat)				
Ind. Ratepayers win (new seat)				
