= 1998 Havering London Borough Council election =

← 1994	7 May 1998	2002 →

All 63 seats up for election to Havering London Borough Council 32 seats needed for a majority
- Registered: 177,509
- Turnout: 60,891, 34.30% (▼11.64)

	First party	Second party
Leader	Wilfred C. Mills	Unknown
Party	Labour	Residents
Leader since	1997	Unknown
Leader's seat	Hilldene	Unknown
Last election	31 seats, 43.87%	17 seats, 18.18%
Seats before	27	21
Seats won	29	17
Seat change	▼2	Steady
Popular vote	55,964	37,407
Percentage	38.55%	25.77%
Swing	▼5.32	▲7.59
	Third party	Fourth party
Leader	Unknown	Unknown
Party	Conservative	Liberal Democrats
Leader since	Unknown	Unknown
Leader's seat	Unknown	Unknown
Last election	11 seats, 25.02%	4 seats, 11.65%
Seats before	12	2
Seats won	14	3
Seat change	▲3	▼1
Popular vote	40,493	8,139
Percentage	27.90%	5.61%
Swing	▲2.88	▼6.04
Council control before election
No Overall Control
Council control after election
No Overall Control

The 1998 Havering London Borough Council election took place on 7 May 1998 to elect members of Havering London Borough Council in London, England. The whole council was up for election and the council stayed in no overall control.

== Electoral arrangements ==
63 councillors were elected from 25 wards. Each ward returned two or three councillors. The 1998 election was the last to use the wards established in 1978 (and subject to minor revision in 1994) with new boundaries in use for the next election in 2002. Councillors were elected for a four-year term.

Polling took place on 7 May 1998.

== Results ==
Labour remained the largest group on the council, losing two seats to become three short of a majority. The Labour Party lost two seats to the Conservatives in Collier Row ward, two seats to the Liberal Democrats in Oldchurch ward and one to the Residents Association in St Andrew's ward. Two seats were gained by Labour from the Liberal Democrats in Harold Wood ward. The Conservatives gained one seat from the Liberal Democrats in St Edward's ward.

1998 Havering London Borough Council election
Party	Seats	Gains	Losses	Net gain/loss	Seats %	Votes %	Votes	+/−
Labour	29	3	5	▼2	46.03	38.55	55,964	▼5.32
Residents	17	1	1	Steady	26.98	25.77	37,407	▲7.59
Conservative	14	3	0	▲3	22.22	27.90	40,493	▲2.88
Liberal Democrats	3	2	3	▼1	4.76	5.61	8,139	▼6.04
Ind. Residents	0	0	0	Steady	0.00	1.58	2,302	New
Third Way	0	0	0	Steady	0.00	0.59	851	▲0.12
Total	63						145,156	

== Ward results ==
(*) - Indicates an incumbent candidate

(†) - indicates an incumbent candidate standing in a different ward

=== Airfield ===
Airfield (3)
Party	Candidate	Votes	%	±%
Labour	Raymond Emmett*	1,172	44.35	▼18.66
Labour	Christopher Purnell*	1,093		
Labour	Benjamin Norwin	991		
Residents	Dorothy Gray	636	25.98	New
Conservative	John Carter	482	18.52	▼1.95
Conservative	Charles Morris	454		
Conservative	Nicholas Hughes	424		
Third Way	Jeannie Trueman	273	11.15	▲6.63
Registered electors		7,325		▼174
Turnout		2,080	28.40	▼14.94
Rejected ballots		6	0.29	▲0.26
Labour hold				
Labour hold				
Labour hold				

=== Ardleigh Green ===
Ardleigh Green (2)
Party	Candidate	Votes	%	±%
Conservative	Edward Cahill	867	39.99	▲0.43
Conservative	Mark Gadd	779		
Ind. Residents	Keith Donovan	605	27.65	New
Labour	Janet Fisher	555	25.92	▼2.33
Ind. Residents	Richard Arnold	533		
Labour	David Harding	512		
Liberal Democrats	Peter Spence	145	6.44	▼25.75
Liberal Democrats	Helen Tegg	120		
Registered electors		6,229		▼23
Turnout		2,187	35.11	▼10.44
Rejected ballots		7	0.32	▲0.18
Conservative hold				
Conservative hold				

=== Brooklands ===
Brooklands (2)
Party	Candidate	Votes	%	±%
Labour	Eamonn Mahon	750	44.62	▼9.37
Labour	Jeffery Stafford	663		
Residents	Charles Fancourt	406	25.39	▲13.57
Residents	Carole Burnie	398		
Conservative	Henry Tebbutt	398	22.20	▼11.99
Conservative	David Hayhow	305		
Liberal Democrats	Peter Davies	126	7.80	New
Liberal Democrats	John Deeks	121		
Registered electors		5,594		▼11
Turnout		1,685	30.12	▼19.62
Rejected ballots		6	0.36	▲0.25
Labour hold				
Labour hold				

=== Chase Cross ===
Chase Cross (2)
Party	Candidate	Votes	%	±%
Conservative	Andrew Rosindell*	2,067	81.03	▲19.99
Conservative	Henry Tebbutt	1,730		
Labour	Paul Stygal	462	18.97	▼19.99
Labour	Frederick Symes	427		
Registered electors		5,484		▼18
Turnout		2,587	47.17	▼5.34
Rejected ballots		11	0.43	▲0.19
Conservative hold				
Conservative hold				

=== Collier Row ===
Collier Row (2)
Party	Candidate	Votes	%	±%
Conservative	Andrew Curtin	883	51.58	▲14.79
Conservative	Geoffrey Starns	828		
Labour	Patrick Ridley*	820	48.42	▼14.79
Labour	Comfort Usukumah	786		
Registered electors		5,498		▼93
Turnout		1,817	33.05	▼12.25
Rejected ballots		9	0.88	▲0.56
Conservative gain from Labour				
Conservative gain from Labour				

=== Cranham East ===
Cranham East (2)
Party	Candidate	Votes	%	±%
Residents	Jean Mitchell*	1,570	69.15	▲5.92
Residents	Geoffrey Lewis*	1,465		
Labour	Anthony Gibbs	410	18.23	▼4.75
Labour	John McKernan	390		
Conservative	Terence Lewis	251	9.32	▼4.46
Conservative	Christine Scott	158		
Liberal Democrats	David Bowman	75	3.30	New
Liberal Democrats	Thomas Hall	70		
Registered electors		5,410		▼10
Turnout		2,309	42.68	▼8.15
Rejected ballots		7	0.30	▲0.19
Residents hold				
Residents hold				

=== Cranham West ===
Cranham West (2)
Party	Candidate	Votes	%	±%
Residents	Louisa Sinclair*	2,095	77.60	▲7.12
Residents	Joan Lewis*	1,997		
Labour	Tom Horlock	325	12.21	▼1.12
Labour	Henry Miller	319		
Conservative	Jean Curtin	248	9.24	▼6.95
Conservative	Patrick Curtin	239		
Liberal Democrats	Elizabeth Thomas	34	0.95	New
Liberal Democrats	Michael Thomas	16		
Registered electors		5,467		▼24
Turnout		2,692	49.24	▼6.11
Rejected ballots		4	0.15	▲0.12
Residents hold				
Residents hold				

=== Elm Park ===
Elm Park (3)
Party	Candidate	Votes	%	±%
Labour	Ray Harris	1,640	50.22	▲2.70
Labour	Jack Hopelman*	1,638		
Labour	Janet Davis	1,592		
Conservative	Ronald Clifford	1,143	31.90	▲8.53
Conservative	Norman Forster	1,054		
Conservative	David Lel	896		
Third Way	Graham Williamson	578	17.88	▲0.76
Registered electors		8,786		▼173
Turnout		3,154	35.90	▼13.29
Rejected ballots		24	0.76	▲0.69
Labour hold				
Labour hold				
Labour hold				

=== Emerson Park ===
Emerson Park (2)
Party	Candidate	Votes	%	±%
Conservative	Peter Gardner^{†} (Note: Gardner was a sitting councillor representing the Ardleigh Green ward)	1,019	43.23	▼8.10
Conservative	Paul Rochford	981		
Labour	Maureen Scott	594	23.78	▼2.79
Ind. Residents	Anthony Benton	591	25.16	New
Ind. Residents	James Saunders	573		
Labour	Ronald Whitworth	506		
Liberal Democrats	Graham Watkins	184	7.83	▼14.27
Liberal Democrats	Garry White	178		
Registered electors		7,226		▲57
Turnout		2,442	33.79	▼10.46
Rejected ballots		11	0.45	▲0.32
Conservative hold				
Conservative hold				

=== Gidea Park ===
Gidea Park (2)
Party	Candidate	Votes	%	±%
Residents	Valerie Evans*	1,010	44.36	▲3.45
Residents	Ian Wilkes*	995		
Conservative	Edward Eden	896	38.34	▲0.47
Conservative	Robert Whitton	837		
Labour	Francis Bland	403	17.30	▼3.92
Labour	John Daly	379		
Registered electors		5,644		▼17
Turnout		2,366	41.92	▼6.27
Rejected ballots		7	0.30	▲0.23
Residents hold				
Residents hold				

=== Gooshays ===
Gooshays (3)
Party	Candidate	Votes	%	±%
Labour	Kevin Robinson	1,118	58.13	▼10.48
Labour	William Harrison*	1,070		
Labour	Yvonne Cornell	1,067		
Conservative	Margaret Gardner	337	17.22	▼2.14
Residents	Eric Staggs	331	15.63	New
Residents	Ian Stocker	318		
Conservative	Eileen Rosindell	306		
Residents	Joan Street	226		
Liberal Democrats	Geoffrey Coles	185	9.02	▼3.01
Liberal Democrats	Rosina Martin	174		
Liberal Democrats	John Porter	146		
Registered electors		7,643		▼132
Turnout		1,979	25.89	▼16.77
Rejected ballots		4	0.20	▲0.20
Labour hold				
Labour hold				
Labour hold				

=== Hacton ===
Hacton (3)
Party	Candidate	Votes	%	±%
Residents	Barbara Reith*	1,544	53.22	▲5.00
Residents	Eileen Cameron	1,522		
Residents	Ivor Cameron*	1,517		
Labour	Susan Jiggens	849	29.12	▼6.52
Labour	Richard Harradine	836		
Labour	Bryan Vincent	823		
Conservative	Sidney Ball	537	17.66	▲1.52
Conservative	Maureen Carter	494		
Conservative	Donald Cawthorne	490		
Registered electors		8,802		▲245
Turnout		3,066	34.83	▼17.03
Rejected ballots		2	0.07	▼0.25
Residents hold				
Residents hold				
Residents hold				

=== Harold Wood ===
Harold Wood (3)
Party	Candidate	Votes	%	±%
Liberal Democrats	Jonathan Coles*	1,079	31.96	▼9.20
Labour	Brian Eagling	1,061	34.16	▲2.46
Labour	Caroline Wood	1,054		
Labour	Neil Stanton	999		
Liberal Democrats	Ian Sanderson	947		
Liberal Democrats	Keith Taffs	888		
Conservative	Edward Bates	693	22.03	▼5.11
Conservative	Malcolm Brace	679		
Conservative	Georgina Galpin	637		
Residents	Jeffrey	397	11.85	New
Residents	Patrick Curtis	358		
Residents	Martin Davin	325		
Registered electors		8,377		▲245
Turnout		3,167	37.81	▼9.94
Rejected ballots		7	0.22	▲0.07
Liberal Democrats hold				
Labour gain from Liberal Democrats				
Labour gain from Liberal Democrats				

=== Heath Park ===
Heath Park (2)
Party	Candidate	Votes	%	±%
Conservative	Eric Munday*	1,270	57.12	▼9.96
Conservative	Michael White^{†} (Note: White was a sitting councillor representing the Chase Cross ward)	1,212		
Labour	John McCole	701	31.00	▼1.33
Labour	Richard Packer	646		
Liberal Democrats	Caroline Turner	279	11.88	▼8.63
Liberal Democrats	Madge Mulliner	237		
Registered electors		6,563		▲57
Turnout		2,303	35.09	▼8.30
Rejected ballots		8	0.35	▲0.21
Conservative hold				
Conservative hold				

=== Heaton ===
Heaton (3)
Party	Candidate	Votes	%	±%
Labour	Ken Clark	1,159	62.09	▼6.67
Labour	Ruby Latham*	1,149		
Labour	Denis O'Flynn*	1,143		
Conservative	Richard Wilson	392	19.00	▼0.57
Residents	Winifred Davies	361	18.91	New
Residents	David Evans	357		
Conservative	David Eden	343		
Residents	Peter Galloway	333		
Conservative	Jeanne Eden	321		
Registered electors		8,287		▼196
Turnout		2,046	24.69	▼11.69
Rejected ballots		11	0.54	▲0.41
Labour hold				
Labour hold				
Labour hold				

=== Hilldene ===
Hilldene (3)
Party	Candidate	Votes	%	±%
Labour	Wilfrid Mills*	1,088	73.20	▲1.93
Labour	David Hill	1,085		
Labour	Ann Roberts	1,042		
Conservative	John Neill	442	26.80	▲8.32
Conservative	Cornelius Desmond	372		
Conservative	Andrew Everett	363		
Registered electors		6,043		▼255
Turnout		1,647	27.25	▼15.29
Rejected ballots		11	0.67	▲0.63
Labour hold				
Labour hold				
Labour hold				

=== Hylands ===
Hylands (3)
Party	Candidate	Votes	%	±%
Labour	Raymond Shaw*	1,393	50.64	▼11.15
Labour	May Whitelock^{†} (Note: Whitelock was a sitting councillor representing the Airfield ward)	1,371		
Labour	Michael Wood*	1,296		
Conservative	Martin Sinclair	1,064	38.44	▲16.16
Conservative	Anthony Fawcett	1,019		
Conservative	John Ross	999		
Liberal Democrats	David Bruck	298	10.93	▲0.97
Liberal Democrats	Reginald Leavens	291		
Liberal Democrats	Albert Rabone	287		
Registered electors		9,149		▲199
Turnout		2,823	30.86	▼13.22
Rejected ballots		11	0.39	▲0.34
Labour hold				
Labour hold				
Labour hold				

=== Mawney ===
Mawney (3)
Party	Candidate	Votes	%	±%
Labour	Pamela Craig	1,389	57.10	▲4.03
Labour	Sheila McCole*	1,316		
Labour	Robert Kilbey*	1,242		
Conservative	Derek Price	1,081	42.90	▲10.31
Conservative	Martin Smith	1,037		
Conservative	Jamsheed Khan	847		
Registered electors		8,469		▼29
Turnout		2,594	30.63	▼13.98
Rejected ballots		10	0.39	▲0.34
Labour hold				
Labour hold				
Labour hold				

=== Oldchurch ===
Oldchurch (2)
Party	Candidate	Votes	%	±%
Liberal Democrats	Nigel Meyer	723	50.30	New
Liberal Democrats	Malcolm Zetter	679		
Labour	Tony Gordon*	523	33.37	▼34.91
Labour	Tony Rew*	407		
Conservative	Keith Prince	245	16.33	▼15.39
Conservative	Frederick Thompson	210		
Registered electors		5,131		▲208
Turnout		1,490	29.04	▼6.14
Rejected ballots		3	0.20	▲0.49
Liberal Democrats gain from Labour				
Liberal Democrats gain from Labour				

=== Rainham ===
Rainham (3)
Party	Candidate	Votes	%	±%
Labour	Anthony Ellis*	1,742	54.34	▼10.96
Labour	Harry Webb*	1,657		
Labour	Brian Kent*	1,569		
Residents	Malvin Brown	956	31.37	New
Conservative	Nicola Everett	480	14.29	▼20.41
Conservative	Coral Sinclair	415		
Conservative	Geoffrey Woods	412		
Registered electors		9,410		▼1
Turnout		2,886	30.67	▼9.29
Rejected ballots		5	0.17	▼0.20
Labour hold				
Labour hold				
Labour hold				

=== Rise Park ===
Rise Park (2)
Party	Candidate	Votes	%	±%
Conservative	Norman Symonds*	1,025	44.88	▲2.00
Conservative	Joseph Webster	920		
Residents	John Shrimpton	706	32.49	New
Residents	Michael Winter	702		
Labour	Alan Fenn	516	22.63	▼16.11
Labour	Joseph Macveigh	465		
Registered electors		5,881		▲32
Turnout		2,244	38.16	▼9.26
Rejected ballots		7	0.31	▼0.09
Conservative hold				
Conservative hold				

=== St Andrew's ===
St Andrew's (3)
Party	Candidate	Votes	%	±%
Residents	Christopher Oliver*	1,423	45.76	▲19.86
Residents	John Mylod*	1,416		
Residents	Michael Winter	1,272		
Labour	Georgina Carr	960	31.18	▼10.48
Labour	Graham Carr*	948		
Labour	Terence Matthews	893		
Conservative	Pauline Orrin	711	23.06	▼9.38
Conservative	Thomas Orrin	703		
Conservative	Richard Strauss	657		
Registered electors		8,867		▲112
Turnout		3,148	35.50	▼11.26
Rejected ballots		4	0.13	▼0.04
Residents hold				
Residents hold				
Residents gain from Labour				

=== St Edward's ===
St Edward's (2)
Party	Candidate	Votes	%	±%
Conservative	Raymond Connelly	560	29.77	▼5.68
Conservative	Wendy Thompson	526		
Residents	George Montgomery	447	22.62	New
Labour	George Taylor^{†} (Note: Taylor was a sitting councillor representing the Brooklands ward)	445	24.12	▼4.36
Liberal Democrats	Eden Mulliner	436	23.49	▼12.58
Labour	Caroline Warren	435		
Liberal Democrats	David Williams	421		
Residents	Pamela Wilkes	378		
Registered electors		5,215		▲140
Turnout		1,918	36.78	▼9.78
Rejected ballots		2	0.10	▼0.11
Conservative hold				
Conservative gain from Liberal Democrats				

=== South Hornchurch ===
South Hornchurch (3)
Party	Candidate	Votes	%	±%
Residents	Leonard Long*	1,134	44.76	▼10.14
Residents	Reginald Whitney*	1,012		
Labour	Thomas Binding	964	40.22	▲4.60
Residents	Wendy Clark	951		
Labour	Leslie Reid	927		
Labour	David Burn	892		
Conservative	Dennis Bull	391	15.02	▲5.54
Conservative	Guy Gower	331		
Conservative	Iris Cotier	317		
Registered electors		8,476		▼42
Turnout		2,450	28.91	▼25.62
Rejected ballots		4	0.16	▼0.03
Residents hold				
Residents hold				
Labour gain from Residents				

=== Upminster ===
Upminster (3)
Party	Candidate	Votes	%	±%
Residents	Linda Hawthorn*	3,012	78.87	▲10.49
Residents	Owen Ware*	2,935		
Residents	Muriel Mylod*	2,902		
Labour	Patricia Brown	480	11.56	▼0.30
Labour	David Scott	412		
Labour	Renato Martins	405		
Conservative	Patricia Jones	372	9.57	▼10.19
Conservative	Carol Roberts	344		
Registered electors		8,533		▲74
Turnout		3,811	44.66	▼10.25
Rejected ballots		5	0.13	▼0.02
Residents hold				
Residents hold				
Residents hold				
