= Ardleigh Green (ward) =

Defunct electoral ward in the London Borough of Havering

- Former electoral ward for the Havering London Borough Council
- Ardleigh Green ward boundaries from 1978 to 2002
- Borough: Havering
- County: Greater London
- Population: 8,106 (1991)
- Electorate: 6,076 (1978)
- Major settlements: Ardleigh Green

Former electoral ward
- Created: 1978
- Abolished: 2002
- Councillors: 2
- ONS code: 02BBFB

Ardleigh Green was an electoral ward in the London Borough of Havering from 1978 to 2002. The ward was first used in the 1978 elections. It returned two councillors to Havering London Borough Council.

== Havering council elections ==
=== 1998 election ===
The election on 7 May 1998 took place on the same day as the 1998 Greater London Authority referendum.

1998 Havering London Borough Council election: Ardleigh Green
Party	Candidate	Votes	%	±%
Conservative	Edward Cahill	867		
Conservative	Mark Gadd	779		
Ind. Residents	Keith Donovan	605		
Labour	Janet Fisher	555		
Ind. Residents	Richard Arnold	533		
Labour	David Harding	512		
Liberal Democrats	Peter Spence	145		
Liberal Democrats	Helen Tegg	120		
Turnout				
Conservative hold		Swing		
Conservative hold		Swing		

=== 1994 election ===
The election took place on 5 May 1994.

1994 Havering London Borough Council election: Ardleigh Green
Party	Candidate	Votes	%	±%
Conservative	Ronald Latchford	1,081	39.56	▼15.96
Conservative	Peter Gardner	1,066		
Liberal Democrats	Terry Hurlstone	877	32.19	▲18.64
Liberal Democrats	Valerie Goodwin	871		
Labour	Gordon Thompson	779	28.25	▼2.68
Labour	Kevin Robinson	755		
Turnout				
Conservative hold		Swing		
Conservative hold		Swing		

=== 1990 election ===
The election took place on 3 May 1990.

1990 Havering London Borough Council election: Ardleigh Green
Party	Candidate	Votes	%	±%
Conservative	Peter Gardner	1,549	55.52	
Conservative	Ronald Latchford	1,517		
Labour	Robert Kirchner	884	30.93	
Labour	Kevin Robinson	823		
Liberal Democrats	John Hewitt	404	13.55	
Liberal Democrats	Helen Tegg	344		
Turnout				
Conservative hold		Swing		
Conservative hold		Swing		

=== 1986 election ===
The election took place on 8 May 1986.

1986 Havering London Borough Council election: Ardleigh Green
Party	Candidate	Votes	%	±%
Conservative	Ronald Latchford	1,366		
Conservative	Peter Gardner	1,296		
Labour	Jeanette Thomas	597		
Labour	Philip Wagstaff	529		
Alliance	Aidan Corish	430		
Alliance	Helen Tegg	408		
Green	Michael Wilson	76		
Turnout				
Conservative hold		Swing		
Conservative hold		Swing		

=== 1983 by-election ===
The by-election took place on 10 November 1983, following the resignation of Leonard Trott.

1983 Ardleigh Green by-election
Party	Candidate	Votes	%	±%
Conservative	Peter Gardner	800		
Labour	Jeanette Thomas	418		
Alliance	William Barrett	379		
Ecology	Sarah King	47		
Turnout				
Conservative hold		Swing		

=== 1982 election ===
The election took place on 6 May 1982.

1982 Havering London Borough Council election: Ardleigh Green
Party	Candidate	Votes	%	±%
Conservative	Ronald Latchford	1,607		
Conservative	Leonard Trott	1,576		
Alliance	Aidan Corish	374		
Alliance	William Barrett	351		
Labour	Jethro Farrant	636		
Labour	Anthony Hunt	554		
Turnout				
Conservative hold		Swing		
Conservative hold		Swing		

=== 1978 election ===
The election took place on 4 May 1978.

1978 Havering London Borough Council election: Ardleigh Green
Party	Candidate	Votes	%	±%
Conservative	Thomas Sims	1,856		
Conservative	Leonard Trott	1,842		
Labour	Glenys Chandley	559		
Labour	Dorothy Robinson	541		
Ind. Residents	Ian Wilkes	541		
Ind. Residents	Jack Lewis	421		
Turnout				
Conservative win (new seat)				
Conservative win (new seat)				
