= Rainham (ward) =

Former electoral ward of the London Borough of Havering, England

- Former electoral ward for the Havering London Borough Council
- Rainham ward boundaries from 1978 to 1994
- Borough: Havering
- County: Greater London
- Major settlements: Rainham, Wennington

Former electoral ward
- Created: 1965
- Abolished: 2002
- Councillors: 3

Rainham was an electoral ward in the London Borough of Havering from 1965 to 2002. The ward was first used in the 1964 elections. It returned councillors to Havering London Borough Council.

== 1978–2002 Havering council elections ==
There was a revision of ward boundaries in Havering in 1978. There was a very minor adjustment of the ward boundaries on 1 April 1994.

=== 1998 election ===
The election on 7 May 1998 took place on the same day as the 1998 Greater London Authority referendum.

1998 Havering London Borough Council election: Rainham
Party	Candidate	Votes	%	±%
Labour	Anthony Ellis	1,742		
Labour	Harry Webb	1,657		
Labour	Brian Kent	1,569		
Residents	Malvin Brown	956		
Conservative	Nicola Everett	480		
Conservative	Coral Sinclair	415		
Conservative	Geoffrey Woods	412		
Turnout				
Labour hold		Swing		
Labour hold		Swing		
Labour hold		Swing		

=== 1994 election ===
The election took place on 5 May 1994.

1994 Havering London Borough Council election: Rainham
Party	Candidate	Votes	%	±%
Labour	Anthony Ellis	2,270	65.30	▲30.48
Labour	Harry Webb	2,248		
Labour	Brian Kent	2,191		
Liberal Democrats	Barry Oddy	1,231	34.70	▼11.28
Liberal Democrats	John Green	1,173		
Liberal Democrats	Angela Merritt	1,160		
Registered electors		9,411		▲158
Turnout		3,761	39.96	▼5.90
Rejected ballots		14	0.37	▲0.32
Labour gain from Liberal Democrats				
Labour gain from Liberal Democrats				
Labour hold				

=== 1990 election ===
The election took place on 3 May 1990.

1990 Havering London Borough Council election: Rainham
Party	Candidate	Votes	%	±%
Lib Dem Hotline Team	Brian Kent	1,976	45.98	
Lib Dem Hotline Team	Barry Oddy	1,965		
Lib Dem Hotline Team	Thomas Parker	1,887		
Labour	Patricia Emmitt	1,522	34.82	
Labour	Harry Webb	1,464		
Labour	Christine Watson	1,428		
Conservative	Janet Prince	510	11.81	
Conservative	Hazel Tebbutt	494		
Conservative	Linda White	494		
Green	Frederick Gibson	176	4.17	
Friends of Rainham Marshes	Rosalyn Jenkins	152	3.22	
Friends of Rainham Marshes	Raymond Purse	119		
Registered electors		9,253		
Turnout		4,243	45.86	
Rejected ballots		2	0.05	
Lib Dem Hotline Team hold		Swing		
Lib Dem Hotline Team hold		Swing		
Lib Dem Hotline Team hold		Swing		

=== 1989 by-election ===
The by-election took place on 20 April 1989, following the resignations of Mary Ball and Laraine Saunders.

1989 Rainham by-election
Party	Candidate	Votes	%	±%
Liberal Democrats	Barry Oddy	994		
Liberal Democrats	Brian Kent	976		
Labour	Henry Webb	684		
Labour	Patricia Emmell	670		
Independent Liberal	Mary Ball	660		
Independent Liberal	Grant Bailey	587		
Conservative	Ian Woodward	293		
Conservative	Martin Sinclair	284		
SDP	Terence Matthews	80		
SDP	Harry Rivers	70		
Independent	Jackqucline Cosgrec	35		
Independent	Boris Curtis	23		
Turnout				
Liberal Democrats hold				
Liberal Democrats hold				

=== 1986 election ===
The election took place on 8 May 1986.

1986 Havering London Borough Council election: Rainham
Party	Candidate	Votes	%	±%
Alliance	Mark Long	2,551		
Alliance	Mary Ball	2,401		
Alliance	Laraine Saunders	2,278		
Labour	Patricia Emmett	799		
Labour	William Howard	772		
Labour	Christine Watson	722		
Conservative	Audrey North	401		
Conservative	William North	398		
Conservative	Lorraine Regan	347		
Turnout				
Alliance hold		Swing		
Alliance hold		Swing		
Alliance hold		Swing		

=== 1985 by-election ===
The by-election took place on 26 September 1985, following the resignation of Paul Long.

1985 Rainham by-election
Party	Candidate	Votes	%	±%
Alliance	Mark Long	2,412		
Labour	Henry Webb	651		
Conservative	Audrey North	342		
Turnout				
Alliance hold		Swing		

=== 1983 by-election ===
The by-election took place on 14 April 1983, following the death of Mary Davies.

1983 Rainham by-election
Party	Candidate	Votes	%	±%
Alliance	Kathleen Gibson	1,930		
Residents	Henry Turner	607		
Labour	Christine Watson	582		
Conservative	William North	439		
Ecology	Diane Burgess	14		
Turnout				
Alliance hold		Swing		

=== 1982 election ===
The election took place on 6 May 1982.

1982 Havering London Borough Council election: Rainham
Party	Candidate	Votes	%	±%
Alliance	Mary Ball	2,154		
Alliance	Mary Davies	2,139		
Alliance	Paul Long	2,102		
Residents	Henry Turner	826		
Residents	Donald Poole	772		
Conservative	William North	763		
Conservative	Audrey North	734		
Labour	Norma Emmerson	716		
Labour	Roy Matthews	663		
Conservative	Rachel Reilly	631		
Labour	Christine Watson	593		
Turnout				
Alliance gain from Residents		Swing		
Alliance gain from Residents		Swing		
Alliance gain from Residents		Swing		

=== 1978 election ===
The election took place on 4 May 1978.

1978 Havering London Borough Council election: Rainham
Party	Candidate	Votes	%	±%
Residents	Henry Turner	1,756		
Residents	Donald Poole	1,667		
Residents	George Mooney	1,566		
Labour	Henry Webb	1,192		
Labour	Raymond Emmett	1,117		
Labour	Harry Moss	978		
Conservative	Audrey North	731		
Conservative	Kieran Humphries	703		
Conservative	David Cordell	687		
Turnout				
Residents win (new boundaries)				
Residents win (new boundaries)				
Residents win (new boundaries)				

== 1964–1978 Havering council elections ==
=== 1974 election ===
The election took place on 2 May 1974.

1974 Havering London Borough Council election: Rainham
Party	Candidate	Votes	%	±%
Ind. Ratepayers	Henry Turner	2,185		
Ind. Ratepayers	Donald Poole	2,144		
Ind. Ratepayers	B. Hammond	2,065		
Labour	T. Mitchell	1,362		
Labour	H. Miller	1,343		
Labour	D. Ramstead	1,271		
Conservative	A. North	509		
Conservative	M. Reilly	457		
Conservative	N. Regnier	455		
Liberal	D. Thomson	306		
Liberal	J. Green	293		
Liberal	S. Garred	290		
Turnout				
Ind. Ratepayers hold		Swing		
Ind. Ratepayers hold		Swing		
Ind. Ratepayers hold		Swing		

=== 1971 election ===
The election took place on 13 May 1971.

1971 Havering London Borough Council election: Rainham
Party	Candidate	Votes	%	±%
Ind. Ratepayers	L. Waterman	2,488		
Ind. Ratepayers	Henry Turner	2,473		
Ind. Ratepayers	Donald Poole	2,411		
Labour	I. Whysall	2,124		
Labour	H. Wright	2,079		
Labour	H. Hull	2,017		
Conservative	A. North	538		
Conservative	I. Lamont	531		
Conservative	V. Manning	531		
Communist	T. Stapleton	98		
Turnout				
Ind. Ratepayers hold		Swing		
Ind. Ratepayers hold		Swing		
Ind. Ratepayers hold		Swing		

=== 1968 election ===
The election took place on 9 May 1968.

1968 Havering London Borough Council election: Rainham
Party	Candidate	Votes	%	±%
Ind. Residents	Henry Turner	2,683		
Ind. Residents	Donald Poole	2,643		
Ind. Residents	L. Waterman	2,504		
Conservative	I. Lamont	823		
Labour	H. Bygate	591		
Labour	E. O'Donnell	578		
Labour	A. Bowers	575		
Communist	T. Stapleton	175		
Turnout				
Ind. Residents gain from Independent		Swing		
Ind. Residents gain from Independent		Swing		
Ind. Residents gain from Independent		Swing		

=== 1964 election ===
The election took place on 7 May 1964.

1964 Havering London Borough Council election: Rainham
Party	Candidate	Votes	%	±%
Independent	Henry Turner	2,551		
Independent	Donald Poole	2,516		
Independent	A. Livingstone	2,511		
Labour	R. Cartwright	1,892		
Labour	C. Welch	1,855		
Labour	J. Pittaway	1,765		
Communist	F. Barlow	136		
Turnout		4,551	44.7	
Independent win (new seat)				
Independent win (new seat)				
Independent win (new seat)				
