= Heaton (Havering ward) =

Electoral ward in Havering, Greater London, United Kingdom

- Electoral ward for the Havering London Borough Council
- Heaton ward boundaries since 2022
- Borough: Havering
- County: Greater London
- Population: 17,211 (2021) (Note: 2021 Census data reported for 2022 ward boundaries)
- Electorate: 11,525 (2022)
- Major settlements: Harold Hill
- Area: 3.041 square kilometres (1.174 sq mi)

Current electoral ward
- Created: 1965
- Number of members: 1965–1978: 2; 1978–present: 3
- Councillors: Kevin Ayres; Iurie Bivol; Khuram Amin
- GSS code: E05013975 (2022–present)

Heaton is an electoral ward in the London Borough of Havering. The ward has existed since the creation of the borough on 1 April 1965 and was first used in the 1964 elections. It returns councillors to Havering London Borough Council.

The ward was subject to boundary revisions in 1978, 2002 and 2022. The revision in 1978 increased the number of councillors from two to three. The ward has covered western parts of the London County Council-built Harold Hill estate that was completed in 1958. (Note: The remainder of the estate has been represented by councillors elected from the Gooshays and Hilldene wards.) It has been dominated by the Labour Party throughout its existence. Notable councillors have been Michael Ward, who was MP for Peterborough and Keith Darvill, who was MP for Upminster.

== List of councillors ==
Term	Councillor	Party
1964–1968	W. Morley	Labour
1964–1971	Michael Ward	Labour
1968–1971	D. Burn	Labour
1971–1978	Jocelyn Spindler	Labour
1971–2006	Denis O'Flynn	Labour
2010–2014	Denis O'Flynn	Labour
2018–2022	Denis O'Flynn	Labour
1978–1982	Robert Harris	Labour
1978–1994	Geoffrey Otter	Labour
1980–1982	Michael Blake	Labour
1982–2001	Ruby Latham	Labour
1994–1998	Ghassan Karian	Labour
1998–2002	Ken Clark	Labour
2001–2002	Sean Willis	Labour
2002–2026	Keith Darvill	Labour
2002–2006	Wilf Mills	Labour
2006–2010	Christine Fox	Conservative
2006–2010	Gary Adams	Conservative
2010–2014	Paul Mcgeary	Labour
2014–2016	Philip Hyde (Note: Philip Hyde changed parties in 2015)	UKIP
2014–2016	Philip Hyde	Independent
2014–2018	Ian de Wulverton	UKIP
2018–2022	Ramota Lawal	Labour
2022–2026	Mandy Anderson	Labour
2022–2026	Frankie Walker	Labour
2026–present	Kevin Ayres	Reform
2026–present	Iurie Bivol	Reform
2026–present	Khuram Amin	Reform

== Havering council elections since 2022 ==
There was a revision of ward boundaries in Havering in 2022.

=== 2026 election ===
The election took place on 7 May 2026.

2026 Havering London Borough Council election: Heaton (3)
Party	Candidate	Votes	%	±%
Reform	Kevin Ayres	1,829		
Reform	Iurie Bivol	1,621		
Reform	Amin Khuram	1,588		
Labour Co-op	Keith Darvill	752		
Labour Co-op	Frankie Walker	682		
Labour Co-op	Aishwarya Kumar	634		
Havering Residents Association	Rose Dawson	587		
Green	Carole Beth	583		
Havering Residents Association	Nicky Saunter	471		
Green	Aziz Mogaji	470		
Green	Daljit Jutla	461		
Havering Residents Association	Alex Vella	447		
Conservative	James Gallagher	444		
Conservative	Sultana Jahan	333		
Conservative	Kingsley Momodu	303		
Liberal Democrats	Kerrie Sait	124		
Turnout			32.2	
Reform gain from Labour		Swing		
Reform gain from Labour		Swing		
Reform gain from Labour		Swing		

=== 2022 election ===
The election took place on 5 May 2022.

2022 Havering London Borough Council election: Heaton (3)
Party	Candidate	Votes	%	±%
Labour	Mandy Anderson	1,267	48.7	
Labour	Keith Darvill	1,200	46.1	
Labour	Frankie Walker	1,153	44.3	
Conservative	Oluwatoyin Ajidele	775	29.8	
Conservative	Edward Green	645	24.8	
Conservative	Richard Rimkus	598	23.0	
Ind. Residents	Martin Glenn	563	21.6	
Ind. Residents	Wendy Brice-Thompson	548	21.0	
Ind. Residents	Mary Bakoulas	463	17.8	
Residents	Bill Lavender	308	11.8	
Residents	Lesley Tyler	292	11.2	
Turnout			23.79	
Majority		378	14.5	
Labour win (new boundaries)				
Labour win (new boundaries)				
Labour win (new boundaries)				

== 2002–2022 Havering council elections ==
Heaton ward boundaries from 2002 to 2022

There was a revision of ward boundaries in Havering in 2002.

=== 2018 election ===
The election took place on 3 May 2018.

2018 Havering London Borough Council election: Heaton (3)
Party	Candidate	Votes	%	±%
Labour	Keith Darvill	1,109	35.7	
Labour	Denis O'Flynn	1,063	34.2	
Labour	Ramota Lawal	1,050	33.8	
Conservative	Wendy Brice-Thompson	904	29.1	
Independent	Christopher Cooper	843	27.1	
Conservative	Keith Wells	829	26.7	
Conservative	Garry Pain	723	23.3	
Independent	Philip Hyde	673	21.7	
UKIP	Ian de Wulverton	557	17.9	
UKIP	Brian Parker	367	11.8	
UKIP	John Thurtle	296	9.5	
Liberal Democrats	John Deeks	105	3.4	
Turnout			30.18	
Majority		146		
Labour hold		Swing		
Labour gain from UKIP		Swing		
Labour gain from UKIP		Swing		

=== 2016 by-election ===
The by-election took place on 5 May 2016, following the resignation of Phillip Hyde.

2016 Heaton by-election
Party	Candidate	Votes	%	±%
Labour	Denis O'Flynn	1,122	30.1	+0.4
Conservative	Keith Wells	951	25.5	+6.8
UKIP	John Thurtle	864	23.3	−14.9
Independent	Christopher Cooper	515	13.8	+13.8
Green	Peter Caton	107	2.9	+2.9
Liberal Democrats	Jonathan Coles	86	2.3	+2.3
BNP	Denise Underwood	73	2.0	−11.7
National Front	Kevin Layzell	14	0.4	+0.4
Majority		171		
Turnout				
Labour gain from UKIP		Swing		

=== 2014 election ===
The election took place on 22 May 2014. Philip Hyde sat as an independent councillor from 2015.

2014 Havering London Borough Council election: Heaton (3)
Party	Candidate	Votes	%	±%
UKIP	Philip Hyde	1,549		
UKIP	Ian de Wulverton	1,506		
Labour	Keith Darvill	1,206		
Labour	Denis O'Flynn	1,165		
Labour	Paul McGeary	1,135		
Conservative	Robert Binion	761		
Conservative	Wesley Smith	636		
Conservative	Matthew Sutton	606		
BNP	Kevin Layzell	556		
Turnout			37	
UKIP gain from Labour		Swing		
UKIP gain from Labour		Swing		
Labour hold		Swing		

=== 2010 election ===
The election on 6 May 2010 took place on the same day as the United Kingdom general election.

2010 Havering London Borough Council election: Heaton (3)
Party	Candidate	Votes	%	±%
Labour	Keith Darvill	1,823		
Labour	Denis O'Flynn	1,739		
Labour	Paul Mcgeary	1,696		
Conservative	Christine Fox	1,614		
Conservative	Patricia Clark	1,566		
Conservative	Christopher Ryan	1,521		
BNP	Michael Braun	954		
BNP	William Whelpley	945		
UKIP	Ian De Wulverton	810		
Residents	Mark Kettley	459		
Residents	Anne Anne	363		
Residents	Peter Willers	306		
Turnout				
Labour gain from Conservative		Swing		
Labour hold		Swing		
Labour gain from Conservative		Swing		

=== 2006 election ===
The election took place on 4 May 2006.

2006 Havering London Borough Council election: Heaton (3)
Party	Candidate	Votes	%	±%
Conservative	Christine Fox	930	29.7	
Labour	Keith Darvill	902	28.8	
Conservative	Gary Adams	899		
Labour	Ken Clark	884		
Labour	Caroline Wood	811		
Conservative	Gary Murphy	794		
BNP	Anthony Easton	595	19.0	
UKIP	Colin Rout	568	18.1	
UKIP	Lawrence Webb	431		
UKIP	Ian de Wulverton	401		
Independent	Terence Burland	139	4.4	
Independent	Damian Wakeman	122		
Turnout			32.3	
Conservative gain from Labour		Swing		
Labour hold		Swing		
Conservative gain from Labour		Swing		

=== 2002 election ===
The election took place on 2 May 2002. As an experiment, it was a postal voting election, with the option to hand the papers in on election day.

2002 Havering London Borough Council election: Heaton (3)
Party	Candidate	Votes	%	±%
Labour	Keith Darvill	1,434		
Labour	Denis O'Flynn	1,402		
Labour	Wilf Mills	1,353		
Conservative	Keith Wells	1,087		
Conservative	Mark Joy	1,069		
Conservative	Edward Bates	1,060		
Ind. Working Class	Henry Wilson	991		
Ind. Working Class	Neil Stanton	941		
Ind. Working Class	John Morley	933		
Turnout				
Labour win (new boundaries)				
Labour win (new boundaries)				
Labour win (new boundaries)				

== 1978–2002 Havering council elections ==
Heaton ward boundaries from 1978 to 2002

There was a revision of ward boundaries in Havering in 1978.

=== 2001 by-election ===
The by-election took place on 25 January 2001, following the death of Ruby Latham.

2001 Heaton by-election
Party	Candidate	Votes	%	±%
Labour	Sean Willis	582	46.2	−14.4
Conservative	Edward Bates	240	19.0	−1.5
Residents	Eric Staggs	139	11.0	+11.0
Independent	Neil Stanton	135	10.7	+10.7
Liberal Democrats	Henry Wilson	91	7.2	+7.2
UKIP	Terry Murray	74	5.9	+5.9
Majority		342	27.2	
Turnout		1,261	15.2	
Labour hold		Swing		

=== 1998 election ===
The election on 7 May 1998 took place on the same day as the 1998 Greater London Authority referendum.

1998 Havering London Borough Council election: Heaton (3)
Party	Candidate	Votes	%	±%
Labour	Ken Clark	1,159		
Labour	Ruby Latham	1,149		
Labour	Denis O'Flynn	1,143		
Conservative	Richard Wilson	392		
Residents	Winifred Davies	361		
Residents	David Evans	357		
Conservative	David Eden	343		
Residents	Peter Galloway	333		
Conservative	Jeanne Eden	321		
Turnout				
Labour hold		Swing		
Labour hold		Swing		
Labour hold		Swing		

=== 1994 election ===
The election took place on 5 May 1994.

1994 Havering London Borough Council election: Heaton (3)
Party	Candidate	Votes	%	±%
Labour	Denis O'Flynn	2,192		
Labour	Ruby Latham	2,187		
Labour	Ghassan Karian	2,124		
Conservative	David Ratcliffe	629		
Conservative	Hazel Tebbutt	619		
Conservative	Richard Richardson	603		
Liberal Democrats	John Porter	403		
Liberal Democrats	Sarah Wilding	352		
Liberal Democrats	Susan Williams	350		
Turnout				
Labour hold		Swing		
Labour hold		Swing		
Labour hold		Swing		

=== 1990 election ===
The election took place on 3 May 1990.

1990 Havering London Borough Council election: Heaton (3)
Party	Candidate	Votes	%	±%
Labour	Ruby Latham	2,529		
Labour	Denis O'Flynn	2,465		
Labour	Geoffrey Otter	2,380		
Conservative	David Ralcliffe	928		
Conservative	Clive Milton	922		
Conservative	Dirk Russell	828		
Turnout				
Labour hold		Swing		
Labour hold		Swing		
Labour hold		Swing		

=== 1986 election ===
The election took place on 8 May 1986.

1986 Havering London Borough Council election: Heaton (3)
Party	Candidate	Votes	%	±%
Labour	Denis O'Flynn	1,768		
Labour	Geoffrey Otter	1,678		
Labour	Ruby Latham	1,471		
Conservative	Gareth Fox	760		
Conservative	Garry Hillier	707		
Conservative	Paul Piddington	622		
Alliance	Harold Offen	506		
Alliance	Lesley Durso	452		
Alliance	Henry Blackborow	403		
Turnout				
Labour hold		Swing		
Labour hold		Swing		
Labour hold		Swing		

=== 1982 election ===
The election took place on 6 May 1982.

1982 Havering London Borough Council election: Heaton (3)
Party	Candidate	Votes	%	±%
Labour	Denis O'Flynn	1,260		
Labour	Geoffrey Otter	1,227		
Labour	Ruby Latham	1,186		
Conservative	Helen Forster	857		
Conservative	Stephen Brabner	854		
Alliance	Barry Keates	836		
Conservative	Pamela Light	794		
Alliance	John Kiff	767		
Alliance	Donald Rogerson	748		
Turnout				
Labour hold		Swing		
Labour hold		Swing		
Labour hold		Swing		

=== 1980 by-election ===
The by-election took place on 15 May 1980, following the resignation of Robert Harris.

1980 Heaton by-election
Party	Candidate	Votes	%	±%
Labour	Michael Blake	2,040		
Conservative	Anthony Spencer	471		
Liberal	Edward Freeman	233		
Turnout				
Labour hold		Swing		

=== 1978 election ===
The election took place on 4 May 1978.

1978 Havering London Borough Council election: Heaton (3)
Party	Candidate	Votes	%	±%
Labour	Robert Harris	1,632		
Labour	Denis O'Flynn	1,567		
Labour	Geoffrey Otter	1,465		
Conservative	Nigel Boyle	972		
Conservative	John Hann	956		
Conservative	Julian Chiningworth	942		
Turnout				
Labour win (new boundaries)				
Labour win (new boundaries)				
Labour win (new boundaries)				

== 1964–1978 Havering council elections ==
External image
- Map showing Heaton ward boundaries from 1965 to 1978

=== 1974 election ===
The election took place on 2 May 1974.

1974 Havering London Borough Council election: Heaton (2)
Party	Candidate	Votes	%	±%
Labour	Jocelyn Spindler	1,301		
Labour	Denis O'Flynn	1,278		
Conservative	D. Cure	373		
Conservative	R. Forster	353		
Liberal	B. Maynard	184		
Liberal	A. Rabone	152		
Turnout				
Labour hold		Swing		

=== 1971 by-election ===
The by-election took place on 8 July 1971.

Heaton by-election, 8 July 1971
Party	Candidate	Votes	%	±%
Labour	Denis O'Flynn	1,014		
Conservative	A. North	170		
Liberal	B. Grant	38		
Turnout			17.8%	
Labour hold		Swing		

=== 1971 election ===
The election took place on 13 May 1971.

1971 Havering London Borough Council election: Heaton (2)
Party	Candidate	Votes	%	±%
Labour	Jocelyn Spindler	2,234		
Labour	Michael Ward	2,211		
Conservative	D. Cure	286		
Conservative	E. Souter	279		
Turnout				
Labour hold		Swing		
Labour hold		Swing		

=== 1968 election ===
The election took place on 9 May 1968.

1968 Havering London Borough Council election: Heaton (2)
Party	Candidate	Votes	%	±%
Labour	Michael Ward	955		
Labour	D. Burn	922		
Conservative	C. Kemp	709		
Conservative	D. Cure	683		
Turnout				
Labour hold		Swing		
Labour hold		Swing		

=== 1964 election ===
The election took place on 7 May 1964.

1964 Havering London Borough Council election: Heaton (2)
Party	Candidate	Votes	%	±%
Labour	W. Morley	1,642		
Labour	Michael Ward	1,615		
Conservative	P. Foulger	206		
Conservative	M. Line	176		
Communist	V. Carpenter	62		
Turnout		1,888	29.5	
Labour win (new seat)				
Labour win (new seat)				
