= Gooshays (ward) =

Electoral ward in the London Borough of Havering

- Electoral ward for the Havering London Borough Council
- Gooshays ward boundaries since 2022
- Borough: Havering
- County: Greater London
- Population: 17,780 (2021) (Note: 2021 Census data reported for 2022 ward boundaries)
- Electorate: 11,635 (2022)
- Major settlements: Harold Hill and Noak Hill
- Area: 8.559 square kilometres (3.305 sq mi)

Current electoral ward
- Created: 1965
- Number of members: 3
- Councillors: Keith Prince; Liz Tyler; Robert Whitton
- GSS code: E05013971 (2022–present)

Gooshays is an electoral ward in the London Borough of Havering. The ward has existed since the creation of the borough on 1 April 1965 and was first used in the 1964 elections. It returns councillors to Havering London Borough Council.

The ward was subject to boundary revisions in 1978, 2002 and 2022. The ward has covered Noak Hill and the eastern parts of the London County Council-built Harold Hill estate that was completed in 1958. (Note: The remainder of the estate has been represented by councillors elected from the Heaton and Hilldene wards.)

== Councillors since 2002 ==
Election	Councillors		
2002	William Harrison (Labour Party)	Yvonne Cornell (Labour Party)	Jeffery Stafford (Labour Party)
2006	Alan Bailey (BNP)	Dennis Bull (Conservative Party)	Keith Wells (Conservative Party)
2008 by-election	Mark Logan (BNP)	Dennis Bull (Conservative Party)	Keith Wells (Conservative Party)
2010	Patrick Murray (Labour Party)	Dennis Bull (Conservative Party)	Keith Wells (Conservative Party)
2013 by-election	Patrick Murray (Labour Party)	Lawrence Webb (UKIP)	Keith Wells (Conservative Party)
2014	David Johnson (UKIP)	Lawrence Webb (UKIP)	Patricia Rumble (UKIP)
2018	Carole Beth (Labour Party)	Paul McGeary (Labour Party)	Jan Sargent (Harold Hill Independent)
2022	Patricia Brown (Labour Party)	Paul McGeary (Labour Party)	Catherine Tumilty (Labour Party)
2026	Keith Prince (Reform UK)	Liz Tyler (Reform UK)	Robert Whitton (Reform UK)

== Havering council elections since 2022 ==
There was a revision of ward boundaries in Havering in 2022.

=== 2026 election ===
The election took place on 7 May 2026.

2026 Havering London Borough Council election: Gooshays (3)
Party	Candidate	Votes	%	±%
Reform	Keith Prince (Note: Councillor for Squirrels Heath since 2018. Stood as a Conservative Party candidate in 2018.)	1,738		
Reform	Liz Tyler	1,711		
Reform	Robert Whitton	1,542		
Havering Residents Association	Paul McGeary	661		
Labour Co-op	Patricia Brown	622		
Havering Residents Association	Ozlem Colak	606		
Havering Residents Association	Louise Newton	606		
Labour Co-op	Sally Omosun	508		
Green	Marissa Jewell	477		
Green	Cenred Elworthy	472		
Labour Co-op	Theo Shaw	471		
Green	Callum Lewis	447		
Conservative	Toyin Ajidele	446		
Conservative	Patrick Marks	362		
Conservative	Dominika Kukielka	322		
Harold Wood Hill Park RA	Martin Glenn	234		
Harold Wood Hill Park RA	Sam Jobber	210		
Harold Wood Hill Park RA	Andrew Wallington	130		
Independent	Philip Hyde	100		
Liberal Democrats	Nigel Meyer	86		
Turnout			35.26	
Reform gain from Labour		Swing		
Reform gain from Labour		Swing		
Reform gain from Labour		Swing		

=== 2022 election ===
The election took place on 5 May 2022.

2022 Havering London Borough Council election: Gooshays (3)
Party	Candidate	Votes	%	±%
Labour	Patricia Brown	1,038	39.8	
Labour	Paul McGeary	1,014	38.9	
Labour	Katharine Tumilty	901	34.5	
Ind. Residents	Isabelle Alexander	754	28.9	
Conservative	Emilia Kukielka	721	27.6	
Conservative	Gregory Samuel	720	27.6	
Ind. Residents	Grant MacMaster	689	26.4	
Ind. Residents	Monica Puncheon	575	22.0	
Conservative	Rashpinder Mahal	568	21.8	
Residents	Margaret Kershaw	346	13.3	
Residents	Graham Trew	263	10.1	
Green	Katie Morant	239	9.2	
Turnout			23.5	
Majority		147	5.6	
Labour win (new boundaries)				
Labour win (new boundaries)				
Labour win (new boundaries)				

== 2002–2022 Havering council elections ==
There was a revision of ward boundaries in Havering in 2002.

Gooshays ward boundaries from 2002 to 2022

=== 2018 election ===
The election took place on 3 May 2018.

2018 Havering London Borough Council election: Gooshays (3)
Party	Candidate	Votes	%	±%
Labour	Carole Beth	1,100	33.1	
Labour	Paul McGeary	973	29.3	
Independent	Jan Sargent	956	28.8	
Independent	Sam Brown	915	27.5	
Labour	Adam Curtis	910	27.4	
Independent	Lorraine Moss	839	25.2	
Conservative	Gregory Samuel	693	20.8	
Conservative	Joseph Webster	619	18.6	
Conservative	Dominic Swan	593	17.8	
UKIP	Ben Buckland	479	14.4	
UKIP	Lawrence Webb	383	11.5	
UKIP	Patricia Rumble	382	11.5	
Residents	Isabelle Alexander	197	5.9	
Green	Katie Morant	173	5.2	
Residents	Lucia Wise	160	4.8	
Residents	Irene Eagling	147	4.4	
Liberal Democrats	John Porter	99	3.0	
National Front	Kevin Layzell	50	1.5	
Turnout			40.93%	
Majority		41		
Labour gain from UKIP		Swing		
Labour gain from UKIP		Swing		
Independent gain from UKIP		Swing		

=== 2014 election ===
The election took place on 22 May 2014.

2014 Havering London Borough Council election: Gooshays (3)
Party	Candidate	Votes	%	±%
UKIP	David Johnson	1,848		
UKIP	Lawrence Webb	1,790		
UKIP	Patricia Rumble	1,733		
Labour	Patrick Murray	1,007		
Labour	Christine McGeary	942		
Labour	Jeffrey Stafford	803		
Conservative	Marcus Llewellyn-Rothschild	621		
Conservative	Keith Wells	614		
Conservative	Keith Evans	608		
Residents	Adam Elliott	280		
Residents	Lucia Wise	257		
BNP	Raymond Underwood	247		
Liberal Democrats	John Porter	106		
Turnout			36	
UKIP gain from Labour		Swing		
UKIP hold		Swing		
UKIP gain from Conservative		Swing		

=== 2013 by-election ===
The by-election took place on 21 March 2013, following the death of Dennis Bull.

2013 Gooshays by-election
Party	Candidate	Votes	%	±%
UKIP	Lawrence Webb	831	38.95	+24.6
Labour	Christine McGeary	569	26.67	−1.8
Conservative	Marcus Llewellyn-Rothschild	280	13.12	−12.5
Residents	Darren Wise	227	10.64	+1.2
BNP	Micky Braun	202	9.47	−12.6
Residents	Malvin Brown	24	1.12	+1.12
Majority		262	12.28	
Turnout		2,133	20.5	
UKIP gain from Conservative		Swing		

=== 2010 election ===
The election on 6 May 2010 took place on the same day as the United Kingdom general election.

2010 Havering London Borough Council election: Gooshays (3)
Party	Candidate	Votes	%	±%
Labour	Patrick Murray	1,869		
Conservative	Dennis Bull	1,682		
Conservative	Keith Wells	1,614		
Labour	Jeffrey Stafford	1,603		
Labour	Ilaria Agostini	1,562		
Conservative	Marcus Llewellyn-Rothschild	1,551		
BNP	Antony Steff	1,445		
BNP	Kelly Steff	1,346		
UKIP	Bryan Woolerton	944		
Residents	Graham Dickinson-Smith	616		
Residents	Lucia Wise	509		
Residents	Jonathon Holt	390		
Turnout				
Labour gain from BNP		Swing		
Conservative hold		Swing		
Conservative hold		Swing		

=== 2008 by-election ===
The by-election took place on 20 March 2008, following the resignation of Alan Bailey.

2008 Gooshays by-election
Party	Candidate	Votes	%	±%
BNP	Mark Logan	865	38.0	+9.8
Labour	Yve Cornell	741	32.5	+6.6
Conservative	Malcolm Fox	489	21.5	−5.5
UKIP	Lawrence Webb	70	3.1	−7.6
Liberal	David Durant	62	2.7	+2.7
Liberal Democrats	Ian Sanderson	52	2.3	+2.3
Majority		124	5.5	
Turnout		2,279	22.6	
BNP hold		Swing		

=== 2006 election ===
The election took place on 4 May 2006.

2006 Havering London Borough Council election: Gooshays (3)
Party	Candidate	Votes	%	±%
BNP	Alan Bailey	996	28.2	
Conservative	Dennis Bull	952	27.0	
Conservative	Keith Wells	916		
Labour	Yvonne Cornell	915	25.9	
Labour	Brian Eagling	912		
Conservative	Marjorie Ramsey	885		
Labour	Jeffery Stafford	814		
UKIP	Florence Leverett	379	10.7	
UKIP	Bryan Woolerton	321		
Residents	Jonathon Holt	199	5.6	
Residents	Jacqueline Williams	162		
Residents	John Parker	157		
Independent	Guy Stevens	88	2.5	
Independent	Wendy Stevens	84		
Independent	Haydn Kent	78		
Turnout			31.0	
BNP gain from Labour		Swing		
Conservative gain from Labour		Swing		
Conservative gain from Labour		Swing		

=== 2002 election ===
The election took place on 2 May 2002. As an experiment, it was a postal voting election, with the option to hand the papers in on election day.

2002 Havering London Borough Council election: Gooshays (3)
Party	Candidate	Votes	%	±%
Labour	William Harrison	1,507		
Labour	Yvonne Cornell	1,415		
Labour	Jeffery Stafford	1,377		
Conservative	Eileen Rosindell	887		
Conservative	Peter Acors	876		
Ind. Working Class	Melanie Stanton	850		
Conservative	Marc Hand	848		
Ind. Working Class	Andrew Walpole	833		
Ind. Working Class	John Clapton	786		
Residents	Debra Staggs	454		
Residents	Eric Staggs	424		
Residents	Joan Street	423		
Turnout				
Labour win (new boundaries)				
Labour win (new boundaries)				
Labour win (new boundaries)				

== 1994–2002 Havering council elections ==
The boundaries of the ward were adjusted on 1 April 1994. The eastern boundary was aligned to the M25 motorway.

=== 1998 election ===
The election on 7 May 1998 took place on the same day as the 1998 Greater London Authority referendum.

1998 Havering London Borough Council election: Gooshays (3)
Party	Candidate	Votes	%	±%
Labour	Kevin Robinson	1,118		
Labour	William Harrison	1,070		
Labour	Yvonne Cornell	1,067		
Conservative	Margaret Gardner	337		
Residents	Eric Staggs	331		
Residents	Ian Stocker	318		
Conservative	Eileen Rosindell	306		
Residents	Joan Street	226		
Liberal Democrats	Geoffrey Coles	185		
Liberal Democrats	Rosina Martin	174		
Liberal Democrats	John Porter	146		
Turnout				
Labour hold		Swing		
Labour hold		Swing		
Labour hold		Swing		

=== 1994 election ===
The election took place on 5 May 1994.

1994 Havering London Borough Council election: Gooshays (3)
Party	Candidate	Votes	%	±%
Labour	Del Smith	2,179	68.61	
Labour	William Harrison	2,070		
Labour	Michael Davis	2,046		
Conservative	Steven Bell	624	19.36	
Conservative	Jacqueline Tebbutt	586		
Conservative	Eileen Rosindell	566		
Liberal Democrats	Yvonne Clayden	391	12.03	
Liberal Democrats	Adam Hurlstone	365		
Liberal Democrats	William Bonnen	347		
Registered electors		7,775		
Turnout		3,317	42.66	
Rejected ballots		0	0.00	
Labour win (new boundaries)				
Labour win (new boundaries)				
Labour win (new boundaries)				

== 1978–1994 Havering council elections ==
Gooshays ward boundaries from 1978 to 1994

There was a revision of ward boundaries in Havering in 1978.

=== 1991 by-election ===
The by-election took place on 16 May 1991, following the resignation of Sean Willis.

1991 Gooshays by-election
Party	Candidate	Votes	%	±%
Labour	Dereck Smith	1,714	54.1	
Liberal Democrats	Terry Hurlestone	845	26.7	
Conservative	Eric Nicholls	607	19.2	
Turnout			39.9	
Labour hold		Swing		

=== 1990 election ===
The election took place on 3 May 1990.

1990 Havering London Borough Council election: Gooshays
Party	Candidate	Votes	%	±%
Labour	Sean Willis	2,440	71.96	
Labour	William Harrison	2,418		
Labour	Michael Davis	2,401		
Conservative	Martin Davis	1,036	28.04	
Conservative	Eileen Rosindell	903		
Conservative	Jacqueline Tebbutt	890		
Registered electors		8,029		
Turnout		3,783	47.12	
Rejected ballots		23	0.61	
Labour hold				
Labour hold				
Labour hold				

=== 1986 election ===
The election took place on 8 May 1986.

1986 Havering London Borough Council election: Gooshays (3)
Party	Candidate	Votes	%	±%
Labour	Ronald Lynn	1,812		
Labour	Wilf Mills	1,693		
Labour	Ronald Whitworth	1,588		
Conservative	Frank Hullyer	795		
Conservative	Doris Hullyer	789		
Conservative	Owen Collins	784		
Alliance	Pamela Offen	494		
Alliance	William Bradman	481		
Alliance	Patricia Allen	479		
Turnout				
Labour hold		Swing		
Labour hold		Swing		
Labour hold		Swing		

=== 1982 election ===
The election took place on 6 May 1982.

1982 Havering London Borough Council election: Gooshays (3)
Party	Candidate	Votes	%	±%
Labour	Ronald Lynn	1,307		
Labour	Ronald Whitworth	1,211		
Labour	Wilf Mills	1,202		
Alliance	Peter Osborne	832		
Conservative	Frank Buckland	805		
Alliance	Joyce Robertson	794		
Alliance	Ian Goldsmith	792		
Conservative	Frank Hullyer	789		
Conservative	Doris Hullyer	778		
Turnout				
Labour hold		Swing		
Labour hold		Swing		
Labour hold		Swing		

=== 1980 by-election ===
The by-election took place on 15 May 1980, following the resignation of Valentine Birnie.

1980 Gooshays by-election
Party	Candidate	Votes	%	±%
Labour	Alan Prescott	1,956		
Conservative	Pamela Marsden	426		
Ind. Ratepayers	Ada Webb	311		
Liberal	David Ingle	271		
Turnout				
Labour hold		Swing		

=== 1978 election ===
The election took place on 25 May 1978. It was due to be held on 4 May 1978, but was delayed due to the death of a candidate.

1978 Havering London Borough Council election: Gooshays (3)
Party	Candidate	Votes	%	±%
Labour	Ronald Lynn	1,495		
Labour	Valentine Birnie	1,408		
Labour	Wilf Mills	1,396		
Conservative	Alison Bush	825		
Conservative	Helen Forster	816		
Conservative	Pamela Marsden	765		
National Front	Albert Yetton	147		
Turnout				
Labour win (new boundaries)				
Labour win (new boundaries)				
Labour win (new boundaries)				

== 1964–1978 Havering council elections ==
External image
- Map showing Gooshays ward boundaries from 1965 to 1978

=== 1974 election ===
The election took place on 2 May 1974.

1974 Havering London Borough Council election: Gooshays (3)
Party	Candidate	Votes	%	±%
Labour	Frank Coffin	1,907		
Labour	G. Dodge	1,834		
Labour	Wilf Mills	1,722		
Conservative	P. Cutcher	560		
Conservative	C. Mawson	499		
Conservative	P. Marsden	489		
Liberal	D. Ingle	253		
Liberal	M. Ingle	236		
Liberal	J. Wright	222		
Turnout				
Labour hold		Swing		
Labour hold		Swing		
Labour hold		Swing		

=== 1971 by-election ===
The by-election took place on 8 July 1971.

1971 Gooshays by-election
Party	Candidate	Votes	%	±%
Labour	Wilf Mills	1,633		
Conservative	M. Noyes	161		
Liberal	T. Hurlstone	77		
Turnout			19.4%	
Labour hold		Swing		

=== 1971 election ===
The election took place on 13 May 1971.

1971 Havering London Borough Council election: Gooshays (3)
Party	Candidate	Votes	%	±%
Labour	Reta Coffin	3,456		
Labour	Frank Coffin	3,310		
Labour	G. Dodge	3,119		
Liberal	P. Collins	529		
Conservative	C. Mawson	372		
Conservative	H. Everitt	348		
Conservative	H. Nock	347		
Liberal	T. Hurlstone	263		
Liberal	T. Keeper	222		
Turnout				
Labour hold		Swing		
Labour hold		Swing		
Labour hold		Swing		

=== 1968 election ===
The election took place on 9 May 1968.

1968 Havering London Borough Council election: Gooshays (3)
Party	Candidate	Votes	%	±%
Labour	Frank Coffin	1,424		
Labour	Reta Coffin	1,367		
Labour	I. Barber	1,251		
Conservative	H. Jefferies	795		
Conservative	C. Mawson	795		
Conservative	T. Rowswell	766		
Communist	W. French	160		
Turnout				
Labour hold		Swing		
Labour hold		Swing		
Labour hold		Swing		

=== 1964 election ===
The election took place on 7 May 1964.

1964 Havering London Borough Council election: Gooshays (3)
Party	Candidate	Votes	%	±%
Labour	O. Roberts	1,011		
Labour	A. Day	971		
Labour	F. Smyth	949		
Liberal	C. Brewster	397		
Liberal	E. Ashford	264		
Conservative	R. Mereweather	236		
Conservative	W. Scates	203		
Conservative	B. Tancock	173		
Communist	R. Cohen	108		
Turnout		2,751	32.1	
Labour win (new seat)				
Labour win (new seat)				
Labour win (new seat)				
