= Mawneys (ward) =

Electoral ward in the London Borough of Havering

- Electoral ward for the Havering London Borough Council
- Mawneys ward boundaries since 2022
- Borough: Havering
- County: Greater London
- Population: 14,478 (2021) (Note: 2021 Census data reported for 2022 ward boundaries)
- Electorate: 10,151 (2022)
- Major settlements: Collier Row
- Area: 3.021 square kilometres (1.166 sq mi)

Current electoral ward
- Created: 1965
- Number of members: 3
- Councillors: Sue Benjamins; Graham Day; Geoff Starns
- GSS code: E05013978 (2022–present)

Mawneys (from 1965 to 2002 Mawney) is an electoral ward in the London Borough of Havering.

== Havering council elections since 2022 ==
There was a revision of ward boundaries in Havering in 2022.

=== 2026 election ===
The election took place on 7 May 2026.

2026 Havering London Borough Council election: Mawneys (3)
Party	Candidate	Votes	%	±%
Reform	Sue Benjamins	1,848		
Reform	Graham Day	1,863		
Reform	Geoff Starns	1,716		
Conservative	Jason Frost	1,581		
Conservative	Dilip Patel	1,495		
Conservative	Carol Smith	1,308		
Green	Manon Delaune	497		
Green	Daniel Nichols	479		
Labour	Richard Packer	450		
Labour	Peter Hale	438		
Green	Zack Yurtsever	428		
Residents	Gemma Bevan	360		
Labour	Omid Zadeh	344		
Residents	Rebecca Wilkes	324		
Residents	Bill Lavender	297		
Liberal Democrats	David Proffitt	134		
Turnout			45	
Reform gain from Conservative		Swing		
Reform gain from Conservative		Swing		
Reform gain from Conservative		Swing		

=== 2022 election ===
The election took place on 5 May 2022.

2022 Havering London Borough Council election: Mawneys (3)
Party	Candidate	Votes	%	±%
Conservative	Jason Frost	1,627	49.5	
Conservative	Dilip Patel	1,595	48.5	
Conservative	Carol Smith	1,467	44.6	
Residents	Carol Baker	1,095	33.3	
Residents	Linda Trew	1,045	31.8	
Residents	Denise Hipson	963	29.3	
Labour	Alison De Melo	681	20.7	
Labour	Christine McGeary	631	19.2	
Labour	Daniel Nichols	587	17.9	
Liberal Democrats	Grenville Brown	87	2.6	
Liberal Democrats	John Deeks	86	2.6	
Turnout			33.56%	
Majority		372	11.3	
Conservative win (new boundaries)				
Conservative win (new boundaries)				
Conservative win (new boundaries)				

== 2002–2022 Havering council elections ==
Mawneys ward boundaries from 2002 to 2022

There was a revision of ward boundaries in Havering in 2002.

=== 2018 election ===
The election took place on 3 May 2018.

2018 Havering London Borough Council election: Mawneys (3)
Party	Candidate	Votes	%	±%
Conservative	Jason Frost	2,446	66.1	
Conservative	Dilipkumar Patel	2,276	61.5	
Conservative	Carol Smith	2,227	60.2	
Residents	Linda Trew	631	17.1	
Labour	Ian James	623	16.8	
Labour	Daniel Nichols	593	16.0	
Labour	Raymond Shaw	505	13.7	
Residents	Graham Trew	492	13.3	
UKIP	Nina Bailey	354	9.6	
Liberal Democrats	Stewart Mott	145	3.9	
Turnout			36.90%	
Majority		1,596		
Conservative hold		Swing		
Conservative hold		Swing		
Conservative hold		Swing		

=== 2014 election ===
The election took place on 22 May 2014.

2014 Havering London Borough Council election: Mawneys
Party	Candidate	Votes	%	±%
Conservative	Jason Frost	2,028		
Conservative	Linda Trew	1,952		
Conservative	Dilip Patel	1,771		
UKIP	Ralph Battershall	1,753		
Labour	Robert Ritchie	827		
Labour	Daniel Nichols	799		
Labour	Michael Agunbiade	703		
Liberal Democrats	Stewart Mott	190		
Turnout			44	
Conservative hold		Swing		
Conservative hold		Swing		
Conservative hold		Swing		

=== 2010 election ===
The election on 6 May 2010 took place on the same day as the United Kingdom general election.

2010 Havering London Borough Council election: Mawneys (3)
Party	Candidate	Votes	%	±%
Conservative	Linda Trew	2,962		
Conservative	Melvin Wallace	2,801		
Conservative	Osman Dervish	2,778		
Residents	Derek Price	1,804		
Residents	Karen Price	1,718		
Residents	Joseph Webster	1,585		
Labour	Susan Maker	1,462		
Labour	Daniel Nichols	1,412		
Labour	Jeffrey Porter	1,316		
BNP	Raymond Underwood	701		
Turnout				
Conservative hold		Swing		
Conservative hold		Swing		
Conservative hold		Swing		

=== 2006 election ===
The election took place on 4 May 2006.

2006 Havering London Borough Council election: Mawneys (3)
Party	Candidate	Votes	%	±%
Conservative	Peter Gardner	1,723	43.0	
Conservative	Melvin Wallace	1,690		
Conservative	Robby Misir	1,570		
Residents	Alexandra Smith	1,378	34.4	
Residents	Derek Price	1,350		
Residents	Martin Smith	1,269		
Labour	Paul McGeary	518	12.9	
Labour	Patience Eagles	512		
Labour	Herbert White	490		
UKIP	Ian Joyce	285	7.1	
Independent	William Spink	105	2.6	
Turnout			40.6	
Conservative hold		Swing		
Conservative hold		Swing		
Conservative hold		Swing		

=== 2002 election ===
The election took place on 2 May 2002. As an experiment, it was a postal voting election, with the option to hand the papers in on election day.

2002 Havering London Borough Council election: Mawneys (3)
Party	Candidate	Votes	%	±%
Conservative	Derek Price	2,621		
Conservative	Alexandra Smith	2,588		
Conservative	Martin Smith	2,547		
Labour	Sheila McCole	1,525		
Labour	Margaret Mullane	1,494		
Labour	Comfort Usukumah	1,392		
Turnout				
Conservative win (new boundaries)				
Conservative win (new boundaries)				
Conservative win (new boundaries)				

== 1978–2002 Havering council elections ==
Mawney ward boundaries from 1978 to 2002

There was a revision of ward boundaries in Havering in 1978.

=== 1998 election ===
The election on 7 May 1998 took place on the same day as the 1998 Greater London Authority referendum.

1998 Havering London Borough Council election: Mawney (3)
Party	Candidate	Votes	%	±%
Labour	Pamela Craig	1,389		
Labour	Sheila McCole	1,316		
Labour	Robert Kilbey	1,242		
Conservative	Derek Price	1,081		
Conservative	Martin Smith	1,037		
Conservative	Jamsheed Khan	847		
Turnout				
Labour hold		Swing		
Labour hold		Swing		
Labour hold		Swing		

=== 1994 election ===
The election took place on 5 May 1994.

1994 Havering London Borough Council election: Mawney (3)
Party	Candidate	Votes	%	±%
Labour	Lorna Feeney	1,765	47.07	▲3.67
Labour	Sheila McCole	1,728		
Labour	Robert Kilbey	1,727		
Conservative	Cyril Field	1,293	32.59	▼6.89
Conservative	Mark Gadd	1,172		
Conservative	Dennis Holmes	1,151		
Liberal Democrats	Peter Davies	507	12.96	New
Liberal Democrats	Alfred Stewart	469		
Liberal Democrats	Sheila Woodhouse	460		
Green	Frederick Gibson	273	7.38	▲1.41
Registered electors		8,498		▼248
Turnout		3,791	44.61	▼5.48
Rejected ballots		2	0.05	▼0.02
Labour hold				
Labour hold				
Labour gain from Conservative				

=== 1990 election ===
The election took place on 3 May 1990.

1990 Havering London Borough Council election: Mawney (3)
Party	Candidate	Votes	%	±%
Labour	Robert Kilbey	1,915	43.40	
Labour	Lorna McLeish	1,909		
Conservative	Cyril Field	1,833	39.48	
Labour	Paul Stygal	1,825		
Conservative	Dennis Holmes	1,703		
Conservative	Michael Robinson	1,602		
SDP	Geoffrey Howard	573	11.15	
SDP	Pamela Offen	466		
SDP	Francis Thompson	413		
Green	Kevin Osborne	259	5.97	
Registered electors		8,746		
Turnout		4,381	50.09	
Rejected ballots		3	0.07	
Labour gain from Conservative		Swing		
Labour hold		Swing		
Conservative gain from Labour		Swing		

=== 1986 election ===
The election took place on 8 May 1986.

1986 Havering London Borough Council election: Mawney
Party	Candidate	Votes	%	±%
Conservative	Cyril Field	1,384		
Labour	Michael Davis	1,330		
Labour	William Gilley	1,315		
Conservative	Dennis Holmes	1,228		
Labour	Barry Nottage	1,218		
Conservative	Keith Prince	1,190		
Alliance	John Bates	959		
Alliance	Pauline Longhorn	903		
Alliance	Paul Einchcomb	881		
Green	Frederick Gibson	119		
Green	Richard Mason	100		
Turnout				
Conservative hold		Swing		
Labour gain from Conservative		Swing		
Labour gain from Conservative		Swing		

=== 1983 by-election ===
The by-election took place on 10 November 1983, following the resignation of Meirion Owens.

1983 Mawney by-election
Party	Candidate	Votes	%	±%
Conservative	Cyril Field	916		
Alliance	Pauline Longhorn	708		
Labour	William Harrison	637		
Ecology	Walter Silcocks	33		
Turnout				
Conservative hold		Swing		

=== 1982 election ===
The election took place on 6 May 1982.

1982 Havering London Borough Council election: Mawney (3)
Party	Candidate	Votes	%	±%
Conservative	Kenneth Roe	1,734		
Conservative	Winifred Whittingham	1,726		
Conservative	Meirion Owens	1,676		
Labour	George Cox	1,126		
Labour	Peter Johnson	1,049		
Labour	Cyril Whitelock	1,005		
Alliance	Pauline Longhorn	727		
Alliance	Mary Nudd	695		
Alliance	Keith Brewington	594		
Turnout				
Conservative hold		Swing		
Conservative hold		Swing		
Conservative hold		Swing		

=== 1978 election ===
The election took place on 4 May 1978.

1978 Havering London Borough Council election: Mawney (3)
Party	Candidate	Votes	%	±%
Conservative	Victor Bush	2,030		
Conservative	Lucy Whittingham	1,889		
Conservative	Nigel Regnier	1,835		
Labour	Ruby Latham	1,394		
Labour	Michael Blake	1,392		
Labour	Wallace Russell	1,322		
Liberal	Joan Freeman	286		
Liberal	Pauline Longthorn	249		
Turnout				
Conservative win (new boundaries)				
Conservative win (new boundaries)				
Conservative win (new boundaries)				

== 1964–1978 Havering council elections ==
=== 1974 election ===
The election took place on 2 May 1974.

1974 Havering London Borough Council election: Mawney (3)
Party	Candidate	Votes	%	±%
Labour	Ruby Latham	1,279		
Conservative	V. Bush	1,243		
Labour	L. Mills	1,241		
Conservative	E. Joslin	1,228		
Conservative	S. Brabner	1,190		
Labour	H. Moss	1,183		
Liberal	P. Burrell	516		
Liberal	R. Packer	427		
Liberal	B. Skilton	389		
Turnout				
Labour hold		Swing		
Conservative gain from Labour		Swing		
Labour hold		Swing		

=== 1971 election ===
The election took place on 13 May 1971.

1971 Havering London Borough Council election: Mawney (3)
Party	Candidate	Votes	%	±%
Labour	Ruby Latham	2,125		
Labour	R. Groizard	2,055		
Labour	J. Selby	2,043		
Conservative	I. Harlock	1,391		
Conservative	K. Allen	1,361		
Conservative	V. Bush	1,333		
Turnout				
Labour gain from Conservative		Swing		
Labour gain from Conservative		Swing		
Labour gain from Conservative		Swing		

=== 1968 election ===
The election took place on 9 May 1968.

1968 Havering London Borough Council election: Mawney (3)
Party	Candidate	Votes	%	±%
Conservative	J. Lucas	2,199		
Conservative	I. Harlock	2,131		
Conservative	A. Sharp	2,119		
Labour	R. Latham	1,030		
Labour	F. Carrick	935		
Labour	R. Kilby	885		
Communist	C. Bacon	170		
Turnout				
Conservative gain from Labour		Swing		
Conservative gain from Labour		Swing		
Conservative gain from Labour		Swing		

=== 1964 election ===
The election took place on 7 May 1964.

1964 Havering London Borough Council election: Mawney (3)
Party	Candidate	Votes	%	±%
Labour	H. Wright	1,722		
Labour	R. Kilbey	1,700		
Labour	L. Eley	1,682		
Conservative	D. Norris	767		
Conservative	B. Fogarty	765		
Conservative	P. Laycock	724		
Independent	J. Hand	328		
Independent	R. Starr	298		
Turnout		2,777	31.9	
Labour win (new seat)				
Labour win (new seat)				
Labour win (new seat)				
