= 1986 Havering London Borough Council election =

1986 local election in England

- 8 May 1986

All 63 Havering London Borough Council seats 32 seats needed for a majority
	First party	Second party
	CON	LAB
Party	Conservative	Labour
Seats won	28	20
Seat change	▼9	▲8
	Third party	Fourth party
	RES	LIB
Party	Residents	Alliance
Seats won	10 (Note: Includes all candidates elected as (Independent) Residents or Ratepayers)	5
Seat change	▲1	Steady

The 1986 Havering Council election took place on 8 May 1986 to elect members of Havering London Borough Council in London, England. The whole council was up for election and the council went in no to overall control.

== Electoral arrangements ==
The 1986 election used the ward boundaries established in 1978 for the third time. 63 councillors were elected from 25 wards. Each ward returned two or three councillors.

Polling took place on 8 May 1986.

== Results ==
The Conservative Party lost nine seats and their majority on the council. Eight seats went from Conservative to Labour in Brooklands, Elm Park, Hylands, Mawney and Oldchurch wards. Residents gained two seats from the Conservatives in South Hornchurch and one seat went the other way in Upminster. This gave the Conservative Party 28 councillors, the Labour Party 20, and the Residents Association 10 councillors, with an increase of one seat. The SDP–Liberal Alliance candidates held their five seats in Chase Cross and Rainham wards.

== Ward results ==
=== Airfield ===
Airfield (3)
Party	Candidate	Votes	%	±%
Labour	Raymond Emmett	1,459		
Labour	Rosina Purnell	1,456		
Labour	Jack Hoepelman	1,454		
Conservative	Charles Morris	897		
Conservative	Margaret Munday	815		
Conservative	Pauline Orrin	800		
Alliance	Alan Hudson	702		
Alliance	Ralph Gordon	684		
Alliance	Harry Rivers	668		
Turnout				
Labour hold		Swing		
Labour hold		Swing		
Labour hold		Swing		

=== Ardleigh Green ===
Ardleigh Green (2)
Party	Candidate	Votes	%	±%
Conservative	Ronald Latchford	1,366		
Conservative	Peter Gardner	1,296		
Labour	Jeanette Thomas	597		
Labour	Philip Wagstaff	529		
Alliance	Aidan Corish	430		
Alliance	Helen Tegg	408		
Green	Michael Wilson	76		
Turnout				
Conservative hold		Swing		
Conservative hold		Swing		

=== Brooklands ===
Brooklands (2)
Party	Candidate	Votes	%	±%
Conservative	Henry Tebbutt	857		
Labour	Arthur Latham	773		
Conservative	Roland Vials	697		
Labour	Diane Tomlinson	687		
Alliance	Eden Mulliner	652		
Alliance	Graham Potter	609		
Turnout				
Conservative hold		Swing		
Labour gain from Conservative		Swing		

=== Chase Cross ===
Chase Cross (2)
Party	Candidate	Votes	%	±%
Liberal Alliance FT	Eric Freeman	1,115		
Liberal Alliance FT	Leonard Parmenter	1,017		
Labour	Robert Kilbey	768		
Labour	Pauline Koseda	759		
Conservative	Roger Farrow	567		
Conservative	George Rusz	469		
Turnout				
Liberal Alliance FT hold				
Liberal Alliance FT hold				

=== Collier Row ===
Collier Row (2)
Party	Candidate	Votes	%	±%
Conservative	Robin Adaire	984		
Conservative	Patrick Curtin	904		
Labour	Anthony Gordon	728		
Labour	Eileen Gordon	669		
Liberal Alliance FT	Edmund Longhorn	596		
Liberal Alliance FT	Angela Thompson	503		
Green	Andrew Smith	40		
Turnout				
Conservative hold		Swing		
Conservative hold		Swing		

=== Cranham East ===
Cranham East (2)
Party	Candidate	Votes	%	±%
Ind. Ratepayers	Rowland Knell	1,461		
Ind. Ratepayers	William Remfry	1,308		
Conservative	Marjorie Ramsey	626		
Labour	Arthur Booton	429		
Labour	Betty O'Callaghan	409		
Alliance	Graham Ford	243		
Alliance	Harold Caton	215		
Turnout				
Ind. Ratepayers hold		Swing		
Ind. Ratepayers hold		Swing		

=== Cranham West ===
Cranham West (2)
Party	Candidate	Votes	%	±%
Ind. Ratepayers	Ron Ower	1,763		
Ind. Ratepayers	Louisa Sinclair	1,763		
Conservative	Bernard Boakes	790		
Conservative	David Perreira	681		
Labour	Marjorie Ville	253		
Labour	Jennifer Hague	249		
Alliance	Martin Flower	197		
Alliance	Joan Holt	158		
Turnout				
Ind. Ratepayers hold		Swing		
Ind. Ratepayers hold		Swing		

=== Elm Park ===
Elm Park (3)
Party	Candidate	Votes	%	±%
Labour	Alan Williams	2,068		
Labour	George Saunders	1,911		
Labour	Michael Lucas	1,818		
Conservative	Joan Arthur	1,415		
Conservative	Derrick Weaver	1,338		
Conservative	Ronald Woods	1,283		
Alliance	Michael Norris	764		
Alliance	Linda Powell	700		
Alliance	John Smith	682		
Residents	Aby Kite	360		
National Front	Graham Williamson	281		
Residents	John Newmeir	242		
Green	Diana Marshall	99		
Turnout				
Labour gain from Conservative		Swing		
Labour gain from Conservative		Swing		
Labour gain from Conservative		Swing		

=== Emerson Park ===
Emerson Park (2)
Party	Candidate	Votes	%	±%
Conservative	Roger Ramsey	1,853		
Conservative	Kenneth Roe	1,647		
Alliance	Antony Gunton	615		
Alliance	John Smailes	555		
Labour	Peter Baines	470		
Labour	Sheila Hills	427		
Green	David Marshall	95		
Turnout				
Conservative hold		Swing		
Conservative hold		Swing		

=== Gidea Park ===
Gidea Park (2)
Party	Candidate	Votes	%	±%
Conservative	David Cure	1,457		
Conservative	Alice Smith	1,367		
Labour	Jacqueline Kirchner	365		
Labour	Simon Thurlow			
Alliance	John Polyblank	337		
Alliance	Rosa Scurry	327		
Turnout				
Conservative hold		Swing		
Conservative hold		Swing		

=== Gooshays ===
Gooshays (3)
Party	Candidate	Votes	%	±%
Labour	Ronald Lynn	1,812		
Labour	Wilf Mills	1,693		
Labour	Ronald Whitworth	1,588		
Conservative	Frank Hullyer	795		
Conservative	Doris Hullyer	789		
Conservative	Owen Collins	784		
Alliance	Pamela Offen	494		
Alliance	William Bradman	481		
Alliance	Patricia Allen	479		
Turnout				
Labour hold		Swing		
Labour hold		Swing		
Labour hold		Swing		

=== Hacton ===
Hacton (3)
Party	Candidate	Votes	%	±%
Residents	Albert Davis	1,381		
Residents	Norman Richards	1,297		
Residents	Barbara Reith	1,283		
Conservative	Dennis Bull	1,015		
Conservative	Margaret Ashby	994		
Conservative	Valerie Colebourn	937		
Labour	David Burn	897		
Labour	Christine French	864		
Labour	Lee Sorrell	859		
Alliance	Roma Penfold	617		
Alliance	David Williams	607		
Alliance	John Hewitt	585		
Turnout				
Residents hold		Swing		
Residents hold		Swing		
Residents hold		Swing		

=== Harold Wood ===
Harold Wood (3)
Party	Candidate	Votes	%	±%
Conservative	Pamela Light	1,666		
Conservative	Harry Humphrey	1,618		
Conservative	Bob Neill	1,614		
Labour	William Harrison	977		
Labour	Neil Brindley	915		
Labour	Keith Darvill	908		
Alliance	Keith Plant	658		
Alliance	Derek Brown	601		
Alliance	Elaine Dorken	562		
Turnout				
Conservative hold		Swing		
Conservative hold		Swing		
Conservative hold		Swing		

=== Heath Park ===
Heath Park (2)
Party	Candidate	Votes	%	±%
Conservative	Mary Edwards	1,347		
Conservative	Eric Munday	1,330		
Labour	Jeannette Bowyer	552		
Labour	Robert Tomlinson	530		
Alliance	Susan Brewington	432		
Alliance	Geoffrey Howard	421		
Green	Alan Burgess	122		
Green	Diane Burgess	119		
Turnout				
Conservative hold		Swing		
Conservative hold		Swing		

=== Heaton ===
Heaton (3)
Party	Candidate	Votes	%	±%
Labour	Denis O'Flynn	1,768		
Labour	Geoffrey Otter	1,678		
Labour	Ruby Latham	1,471		
Conservative	Gareth Fox	760		
Conservative	Garry Hillier	707		
Conservative	Paul Piddington	622		
Alliance	Harold Offen	506		
Alliance	Lesley Durso	452		
Alliance	Henry Blackborow	403		
Turnout				
Labour hold		Swing		
Labour hold		Swing		
Labour hold		Swing		

=== Hilldene ===
Hilldene (3)
Party	Candidate	Votes	%	±%
Labour	Dennis Cook	1,586		
Labour	Dereck Smith	1,430		
Labour	Bessie Whitworth	1,405		
Conservative	David Ratcliffe	1,026		
Conservative	Martin Davis	1,025		
Conservative	Mark Melvin	985		
Alliance	Graham Bridgeman-Clarke	355		
Alliance	Rodney Dorken	326		
Alliance	William Barrett	309		
National Front	Christopher Dowsett	108		
Turnout				
Labour hold		Swing		
Labour hold		Swing		
Labour hold		Swing		

=== Hylands ===
Hylands (3)
Party	Candidate	Votes	%	±%
Conservative	Stephen Evans	1,361		
Labour	Dennis Daflon	1,309		
Conservative	Olive Baruch	1,299		
Conservative	Martin Sinclair	1,294		
Labour	Howard Moss	1,211		
Labour	May Whitelock	1,167		
Alliance	Martin Heazell	1,086		
Alliance	David Kendall	1,086		
Alliance	Elizabeth Heazell	1,079		
Green	Helen Smith	103		
Turnout				
Conservative hold		Swing		
Labour gain from Conservative		Swing		
Conservative hold		Swing		

=== Mawney ===
Mawney (3)
Party	Candidate	Votes	%	±%
Conservative	Cyril Field	1,384		
Labour	Michael Davis	1,330		
Labour	William Gilley	1,315		
Conservative	Dennis Holmes	1,228		
Labour	Barry Nottage	1,218		
Conservative	Keith Prince	1,190		
Alliance	John Bates	959		
Alliance	Pauline Longhorn	903		
Alliance	Paul Einchcomb	881		
Green	Frederick Gibson	119		
Green	Richard Mason	100		
Turnout				
Conservative hold		Swing		
Labour gain from Conservative		Swing		
Labour gain from Conservative		Swing		

=== Oldchurch ===
Oldchurch (2)
Party	Candidate	Votes	%	±%
Labour	Anthony Rew	624		
Conservative	Derek Price	602		
Labour	Sean Willis	600		
Conservative	Ralph Pritty	579		
Alliance	Nigel Meyer	380		
Alliance	Margaret Lakeman	334		
Green	Kim Smith	53		
Turnout				
Labour gain from Conservative		Swing		
Conservative hold		Swing		

=== Rainham ===
Rainham (3)
Party	Candidate	Votes	%	±%
Alliance	Mark Long	2,551		
Alliance	Mary Ball	2,401		
Alliance	Laraine Saunders	2,278		
Labour	Patricia Emmett	799		
Labour	William Howard	772		
Labour	Christine Watson	722		
Conservative	Audrey North	401		
Conservative	William North	398		
Conservative	Lorraine Regan	347		
Turnout				
Alliance hold		Swing		
Alliance hold		Swing		
Alliance hold		Swing		

=== Rise Park ===
Rise Park (2)
Party	Candidate	Votes	%	±%
Conservative	Christopher Kemp	1,316		
Conservative	Norman Symonds	1,291		
Labour	David Ainsworth	518		
Labour	Anthony Larkin	514		
Alliance	John John	439		
Alliance	Peter Dorrington	378		
Turnout				
Conservative hold		Swing		
Conservative hold		Swing		

=== St Andrew's ===
St Andrew's (3)
Party	Candidate	Votes	%	±%
Conservative	Arthur Cotier	1,421		
Conservative	Albert James	1,376		
Conservative	Thomas Orrin	1,368		
Residents	Barbara Farrant	968		
Residents	Graham Watkins	930		
Residents	Stephen Whittaker	865		
Labour	Keith Dutton	762		
Labour	Margaret Hoepelman	721		
Alliance	Adrienne McCarthy	700		
Labour	Robert Kirchner	691		
Alliance	Brian McCarthy	672		
Alliance	Trevor Wood	613		
Green	Teresa Price	71		
Turnout				
Conservative hold		Swing		
Conservative hold		Swing		
Conservative hold		Swing		

=== St Edward's ===
St Edward's (2)
Party	Candidate	Votes	%	±%
Conservative	Lydia Hutton	1,020		
Conservative	Ann Cockerton	992		
Labour	John John	543		
Labour	Joseph Moore	473		
Alliance	Betty McDowell	390		
Alliance	Peter Osborne	363		
Green	May Burgess	87		
Turnout				
Conservative hold		Swing		
Conservative hold		Swing		

=== South Hornchurch ===
South Hornchurch (3)
Party	Candidate	Votes	%	±%
Residents	Leonard Long	1,732		
Residents	Roger Newnham	1,555		
Residents	Reginald Whitney	1,486		
Labour	Henry Webb	1,084		
Labour	Anthony Hunt	1,083		
Labour	Michael Wood	997		
Conservative	John Clark	766		
Conservative	Robert Willoughby	760		
Conservative	Michael White	736		
Alliance	Michael Burke	338		
Alliance	Wendie Norris	296		
Alliance	David Bruck	286		
Turnout				
Residents hold		Swing		
Residents gain from Conservative		Swing		
Residents gain from Conservative		Swing		

=== Upminster ===
Upminster (3)
Party	Candidate	Votes	%	±%
Conservative	Bruce Gordon-Picking	1,835		
Conservative	Jean Frost	1,821		
Conservative	Norman Kemble	1,807		
Ratepayers	Geoffrey Lewis	1,784		
Ratepayers	Joan Lewis	1,700		
Ratepayers	Owen Ware	1,639		
Labour	Tom Horlock	401		
Labour	Margaret Pickford	393		
Labour	James Abrey	392		
Alliance	Margery Ford	366		
Alliance	Colin McArdle	350		
Alliance	Douglas Peters	333		
Turnout				
Conservative gain from Ratepayers		Swing		
Conservative hold		Swing		
Conservative hold		Swing		

== By-elections ==
The following by-elections took place between the 1986 and 1990 elections:

- 1988 Chase Cross by-election
- 1988 Gidea Park by-election
- 1988 Hacton by-election
- 1989 Rainham by-election
