= 1994 Havering London Borough Council election =

Local election in England

- 5 May 1994

All 63 Havering London Borough Council seats 32 seats needed for a majority
- Registered: 177,754
- Turnout: 81,655. 45.94% (▼3.20)

	First party	Second party
Leader	Arthur C. Latham	Unknown
Party	Labour	Residents
Leader since	1990	Unknown
Leader's seat	Brooklands	Unknown
Last election	25 seats, 41.71%	13 seats, 13.05%
Seats before	26	13
Seats won	31	17
Seat change	▲5	▲4
Popular vote	86,997	36,058
Percentage	43.87%	18.18%
Swing	▲2.16	▲5.13
	Third party	Fourth party
Leader	Unknown	Unknown
Party	Conservative	Liberal Democrats
Leader since	Unknown	Unknown
Leader's seat	Unknown	Unknown
Last election	19 seats, 34.99%	6 seats, 9.52%
Seats before	19	5
Seats won	11	4
Seat change	▼8	▼1
Popular vote	49,622	23,103
Percentage	25.02%	11.65%
Swing	▼9.97	▲3.97
Council control before election
No Overall Control
Council control after election
No Overall Control

The 1994 Havering Council election took place on 5 May 1994 to elect members of Havering London Borough Council in London, England. The whole council was up for election and the council stayed in no overall control.

== Electoral arrangements ==
63 councillors were elected from 25 wards. Each ward returned two or three councillors. The 1994 election used the 1978 wards with some boundary revisions that became effective 1 April 1994. The most significant change was Cranham East which lost Great Warley. Gooshays and Harold Wood gained and lost some territory as the borough boundary was aligned to the M25 motorway. (Note: Hylands and Upminster wards were subject to very minor revisions that did not affect any population.)

Polling took place on 5 May 1994.

== Results ==
Labour remained the largest group on the council, gaining five seats and one short of a majority. Labour gained three seats from the Conservatives in Brooklands, Mawney and St Andrew's wards. Two seats were gained from the Liberal Democrats in Rainham. The Residents Association also made gains from the Conservatives with two seats each in Gidea Park and St Andrew's wards.

The council remained in no overall control.

1994 Havering London Borough Council elections
Party	Seats	Gains	Losses	Net gain/loss	Seats %	Votes %	Votes	+/−
Labour	31	5	0	▲5	49.21	43.87	86,997	▲2.16
Residents	17	4	0	▲4	26.98	18.18	36,058	▲5.13
Conservative	11	0	8	▼8	17.46	25.02	49,622	▼9.97
Liberal Democrats	4	1	2	▼1	6.35	11.65	23,103	▲3.97
Independent	0	0	0	Steady	0.00	0.67	1,326	▼0.09
Third Way	0	0	0	Steady	0.00	0.47	924	New
Green	0	0	0	Steady	0.00	0.14	273	▼0.22
Total	63						198,303	

== Ward results ==
(*) - Indicates an incumbent candidate

(†) - Indicates an incumbent candidate standing in a different ward

=== Airfield ===
Airfield (3)
Party	Candidate	Votes	%	±%
Labour	Raymond Emmett*	2,051	63.01	▲4.70
Labour	Christopher Purnell*	1,960		
Labour	May Whitelock*	1,925		
Conservative	Norman Forster	657	20.47	▼10.45
Conservative	Charles Morris	655		
Conservative	Ian Woodward	616		
Liberal Democrats	Brian Philbrooks	400	12.00	▲1.23
Liberal Democrats	Evelyn Weaver	379		
Liberal Democrats	Michael Weaver	351		
Third Way	Oliver Tillett	142	4.52	New
Registered electors		7,499		▼229
Turnout		3,250	43.34	▼3.41
Rejected ballots		1	0.03	▼0.08
Labour hold				
Labour hold				
Labour hold				

=== Ardleigh Green ===
Ardleigh Green (2)
Party	Candidate	Votes	%	±%
Conservative	Ronald Latchford*	1,081	39.56	▼15.96
Conservative	Peter Gardner*	1,066		
Liberal Democrats	Terry Hurlstone	877	32.19	▲18.64
Liberal Democrats	Valerie Goodwin	871		
Labour	Gordon Thompson	779	28.25	▼2.68
Labour	Kevin Robinson	755		
Registered electors		6,252		▼111
Turnout		2,848	45.55	▼0.07
Rejected ballots		4	0.14	▼0.14
Conservative hold				
Conservative hold				

=== Brooklands ===
Brooklands (2)
Party	Candidate	Votes	%	±%
Labour	Arthur Latham*	1,490	53.99	▲10.75
Labour	George Taylor	1,406		
Conservative	Henry Tebbutt*	933	34.19	▼10.97
Conservative	Cyril North^{†} (Note: North was a sitting councillor representing the Chase Cross ward.)	901		
Residents	Eric King	331	11.82	New
Residents	Charles Vincent	303		
Registered electors		5,605		▼126
Turnout		2,788	49.74	▼2.38
Rejected ballots		3	0.11	▼0.06
Labour hold				
Labour gain from Conservative				

=== Chase Cross ===
Chase Cross (2)
Party	Candidate	Votes	%	±%
Conservative	Andrew Rosindell*	1,762	61.04	▲14.06
Conservative	Michael White	1,493		
Labour	Pauline Koseda	1,061	38.96	▲7.85
Labour	Terrance Osborne	1,017		
Registered electors		5,502		▼168
Turnout		2,889	52.51	▼3.20
Rejected ballots		7	0.24	▲0.11
Conservative hold				
Conservative hold				

=== Collier Row ===
Collier Row (2)
Party	Candidate	Votes	%	±%
Labour	Stefan Koseda*	1,543	63.21	▲12.44
Labour	Patrick Ridley*	1,433		
Conservative	Eileen Bramwell	893	36.79	▼12.44
Conservative	Patrick Curtin	839		
Registered electors		5,591		▼214
Turnout		2,533	45.30	▼4.35
Rejected ballots		8	0.32	▼0.10
Labour hold				
Labour hold				

=== Cranham East ===
Cranham East (2)
Party	Candidate	Votes	%	±%
Residents	Jean Mitchell* (Note: Mitchell replaced Cllr William Remfry after his resignation in 1992.)	1,755	63.23	▲14.72
Residents	Geoffrey Lewis	1,624		
Labour	Anthony Gibbs	672	22.98	▼7.79
Labour	Jeffrey Stafford	542		
Conservative	Sheila Ramsey	364	13.78	▼6.94
Registered electors		5,420		▼303
Turnout		2,755	50.83	▼3.04
Rejected ballots		3	0.11	▲0.08
Residents win (new boundaries)				
Residents win (new boundaries)				

=== Cranham West ===
Cranham West (2)
Party	Candidate	Votes	%	±%
Residents	Louisa Sinclair*	2,272	70.48	▲10.37
Residents	Joan Lewis	2,054		
Conservative	Martin Davis	497	16.19	▼6.94
Labour	Tom Horlock	430	13.33	▼3.43
Labour	Lesley Wheaton	388		
Registered electors		5,491		▼146
Turnout		3,039	55.35	▼2.57
Rejected ballots		1	0.03	▼0.03
Residents hold				
Residents hold				

=== Elm Park ===
Elm Park (3)
Party	Candidate	Votes	%	±%
Labour	Jack Hoepelman*	2,260	47.52	▼3.41
Labour	Eric Harris	2,198		
Labour	Howard Moss*	2,056		
Conservative	Lorraine Regan	1,144	23.37	▼6.41
Conservative	Derrick Weaver	1,047		
Conservative	David Lel	1,013		
Third Way	Graham Williamson	782	17.12	New
Liberal Democrats	Stephen Cooper	564	11.99	New
Liberal Democrats	Kathleen Cooper	549		
Liberal Democrats	Bernedette Oddy	530		
Registered electors		8,959		▼137
Turnout		4,407	49.19	▼2.48
Rejected ballots		3	0.07	▼0.36
Labour hold				
Labour hold				
Labour hold				

=== Emerson Park ===
Emerson Park (2)
Party	Candidate	Votes	%	±%
Conservative	Roger Ramsey*	1,647	51.33	▼10.94
Conservative	Angela Watkinson	1,567		
Labour	Martyn Cooper	865	26.57	▲0.38
Labour	Keith F. Dutton	798		
Liberal Democrats	David Bowman	724	22.10	▲10.55
Liberal Democrats	Ian Sanderson	660		
Registered electors		7,169		▲54
Turnout		3,172	44.25	▼3.97
Rejected ballots		4	0.13	▼0.16
Conservative hold				
Conservative hold				

=== Gidea Park ===
Gidea Park (2)
Party	Candidate	Votes	%	±%
Residents	Ian Wilkes	1,099	40.91	New
Residents	Valerie Evans	1,049		
Conservative	Keith Prince*	995	37.87	▼13.21
Conservative	Marjorie Ramsey* (Note: Ramsey replaced Cllr Alice Smith following their resignation in 1992)	993		
Labour	Eileen Gordon	563	21.22	▼4.42
Labour	Francis Bland	551		
Registered electors		5,661		▼34
Turnout		2,728	48.19	▼1.64
Rejected ballots		2	0.07	Steady
Residents gain from Conservative				
Residents gain from Conservative				

=== Gooshays ===
Gooshays (3)
Party	Candidate	Votes	%	±%
Labour	Del Smith	2,179	68.61	▼3.35
Labour	William Harrison*	2,070		
Labour	Michael Davis*	2,046		
Conservative	Steven Bell	624	19.36	▼8.68
Conservative	Jacqueline Tebbutt	586		
Conservative	Eileen Rosindell	566		
Liberal Democrats	Yvonne Clayden	391	12.03	New
Liberal Democrats	Adam Hurlstone	365		
Liberal Democrats	William Bonnen	347		
Registered electors		7,775		▼254
Turnout		3,317	42.66	▼4.46
Rejected ballots		0	0.00	▼0.61
Labour win (new boundaries)				
Labour win (new boundaries)				
Labour win (new boundaries)				

=== Hacton ===
Hacton (3)
Party	Candidate	Votes	%	±%
Residents	Barbara Reith*	2,080	48.22	▲6.89
Residents	Ivor Cameron*	2,032		
Residents	Stephen Whittaker	1,994		
Labour	Ken Clark	1,545	35.64	▲1.54
Labour	Joan Clark	1.511		
Labour	William Howard	1,457		
Conservative	Sidney Ball	665	16.14	▼8.43
Conservative	Laurence Hagger	665		
Conservative	Maureen Carter	653		
Registered electors		8,557		▼1
Turnout		4,438	51.86	▲0.77
Rejected ballots		14	0.32	▲0.30
Residents hold				
Residents hold				
Residents hold				

=== Harold Wood ===
Harold Wood (3)
Party	Candidate	Votes	%	±%
Liberal Democrats	Jonathan Coles	1,628	41.16	▼5.11
Liberal Democrats	Caroline Hurlstone	1,527		
Liberal Democrats	David Parker-Ross	1,505		
Labour	Keith Darvill	1,222	31.70	▲7.20
Labour	Janet Davis	1,187		
Labour	Jennifer Hague	1,179		
Conservative	Jacqueline Owen	1,123	27.14	▼2.09
Conservative	Keith Wells	998		
Conservative	Anthony Bramwell	950		
Registered electors		8,132		▲123
Turnout		3,883	47.75	▼8.85
Rejected ballots		6	0.15	▲0.08
Liberal Democrats win (new boundaries)				
Liberal Democrats win (new boundaries)				
Liberal Democrats win (new boundaries)				

=== Heath Park ===
Heath Park (2)
Party	Candidate	Votes	%	±%
Conservative	Mary Edwards*	1,384	47.16	▼13.52
Conservative	Eric Munday*	1,288		
Labour	John McCole	928	32.33	▼6.99
Labour	Iain Stanford	903		
Liberal Democrats	Caroline Turner	581	20.51	New
Registered electors		6,506		▼59
Turnout		2,823	43.39	▼3.49
Rejected ballots		4	0.14	▼0.44
Conservative hold				
Conservative hold				

=== Heaton ===
Heaton (3)
Party	Candidate	Votes	%	±%
Labour	Denis O'Flynn*	2,192	68.76	▼4.59
Labour	Ruby Latham*	2,187		
Labour	Ghassan Karian	2,124		
Conservative	David Ratcliffe	629	19.57	▼7.08
Conservative	Hazel Tebbutt	619		
Conservative	Richard Richardson	603		
Liberal Democrats	John Porter	403	11.67	New
Liberal Democrats	Sarah Wilding	352		
Liberal Democrats	Susan Williams	350		
Registered electors		8,483		▼379
Turnout		3,086	36.38	▼5.94
Rejected ballots		4	0.13	▼0.35
Labour hold				
Labour hold				
Labour hold				

=== Hilldene ===
Hilldene (3)
Party	Candidate	Votes	%	±%
Labour	Dennis Cook* (Note: Cook was a sitting councillor who replaced Cllr Mark Flewitt who resigned in 1992)	1,894	71.27	▼2.61
Labour	Wilf Mills*	1,700		
Labour	Anthony Hunt*	1,682		
Conservative	Anne Cannings	481	18.48	▼7.64
Conservative	David Hayhow	452		
Conservative	Henry Tebbut Jnr.	436		
Liberal Democrats	John Hewitt	258	10.25	New
Liberal Democrats	Alison Jasper	254		
Liberal Democrats	Keith Plant	246		
Registered electors		6,298		▼235
Turnout		2,679	42.54	▼4.53
Rejected ballots		1	0.04	▼0.61
Labour hold				
Labour hold				
Labour hold				

=== Hylands ===
Hylands (3)
Party	Candidate	Votes	%	±%
Labour	Raymond Shaw*	1,884	39.49	▼4.57
Labour	David Martin	1,878		
Labour	Michael Wood	1,795		
Conservative	Anthony Fawcett	1,056	22.28	▼16.11
Conservative	Janet Levy	1,047		
Conservative	Martin Sinclair	1,032		
Liberal Democrats	David Williams	502	9.96	New
Independent	George Cullen	463	9.87	New
Liberal Democrats	Kevan Wilding	452		
Liberal Democrats	Mark Miller	447		
Independent	Terry Murray	435	9.28	New
Independent	Steven Hudson	428	9.12	New
Registered electors		8,950		▲142
Turnout		3,945	44.08	▼3.14
Rejected ballots		2	0.05	▼0.07
Labour hold				
Labour hold				
Labour hold				

=== Mawney ===
Mawney (3)
Party	Candidate	Votes	%	±%
Labour	Lorna Feeney	1,765	47.07	▲3.67
Labour	Sheila McCole	1,728		
Labour	Robert Kilbey*	1,727		
Conservative	Cyril Field	1,293	32.59	▼6.89
Conservative	Mark Gadd	1,172		
Conservative	Dennis Holmes	1,151		
Liberal Democrats	Peter Davies	507	12.96	New
Liberal Democrats	Alfred Stewart	469		
Liberal Democrats	Sheila Woodhouse	460		
Green	Frederick Gibson	273	7.38	▲1.41
Registered electors		8,498		▼248
Turnout		3,791	44.61	▼5.48
Rejected ballots		2	0.05	▼0.02
Labour hold				
Labour hold				
Labour gain from Conservative				

=== Oldchurch ===
Oldchurch (2)
Party	Candidate	Votes	%	±%
Labour	Tony Gordon*	1,217	68.28	▲19.32
Labour	Anthony Rew*	1,121		
Conservative	Jean Curtin	549	31.72	▼1.66
Conservative	Robin Maillard	537		
Registered electors		5,339		▲338
Turnout		1,878	35.18	▼6.61
Rejected ballots		13	0.69	▲0.64
Labour hold				
Labour hold				

=== Rainham ===
Rainham (3)
Party	Candidate	Votes	%	±%
Labour	Anthony Ellis	2,270	65.30	▲30.48
Labour	Harry Webb	2,248		
Labour	Brian Kent* (Note: Kent was originally a cllr for the Liberal Democrats, but changed parties in between elections)	2,191		
Liberal Democrats	Barry Oddy*	1,231	34.70	▼11.28
Liberal Democrats	John Green	1,173		
Liberal Democrats	Angela Merritt	1,160		
Registered electors		9,411		▲158
Turnout		3,761	39.96	▼5.90
Rejected ballots		14	0.37	▲0.32
Labour gain from Liberal Democrats				
Labour gain from Liberal Democrats				
Labour hold				

=== Rise Park ===
Rise Park (2)
Party	Candidate	Votes	%	±%
Conservative	Norman Symonds*	1,149	42.88	▼7.54
Conservative	John Stevart	1,105		
Labour	Pamela Craig	1,039	38.74	▲3.88
Labour	William Milbank	996		
Liberal Democrats	John Deeks	534	18.38	▲3.66
Liberal Democrats	Eden Mulliner	431		
Registered electors		5,849		▼119
Turnout		2,774	47.42	▼1.37
Rejected ballots		6	0.22	▲0.15
Conservative hold				
Conservative hold				

=== St Andrew's ===
St Andrew's (3)
Party	Candidate	Votes	%	±%
Residents	John Mylod	1,349	25.90	▼6.50
Residents	Christopher Oliver	1,323		
Labour	Graham Carr	1,318	41.66	▲10.84
Labour	Georgina Carr	1,313		
Labour	Benjamin Norwin	1,234		
Residents	Michael Winter	1,199		
Conservative	Dennis Bull*	1,033	32.44	▼4.34
Conservative	Pauline Orrin*	1,000		
Conservative	Thomas Orrin*	976		
Residents	Terence Matthews	331		
Residents	Cynthia Matthews	326		
Residents	Graham Watkins	280		
Registered electors		8,755		▼239
Turnout		4,094	46.76	▼0.73
Rejected ballots		7	0.17	▼0.06
Residents gain from Conservative				
Residents gain from Conservative				
Labour gain from Conservative				

=== St Edward's ===
St Edward's (2)
Party	Candidate	Votes	%	±%
Conservative	Lydia Hutton*	821	35.45	▼22.32
Liberal Democrats	Charles Harrison	820	36.07	New
Liberal Democrats	Helen Tegg	805		
Conservative	Ann Cockerton*	776		
Labour	Michael Flynn	642	28.48	▼13.75
Labour	Patricia Brown	641		
Registered electors		5,075		Steady
Turnout		2,363	46.56	▲0.39
Rejected ballots		5	0.21	▼0.52
Conservative hold				
Liberal Democrats gain from Conservative				

=== South Hornchurch ===
South Hornchurch (3)
Party	Candidate	Votes	%	±%
Residents	Leonard Long*	2,029	54.90	▲3.59
Residents	Roger Newnham*	1,855		
Residents	Reginald Whitney*	1,794		
Labour	Alan Fenn	1,245	35.62	▲3.40
Labour	Sylvia Harrison	1,229		
Labour	Barbara Nunn	1,209		
Conservative	Patricia Field	350	9.48	▼7.00
Conservative	Daniel Regan	327		
Conservative	Joyce Weaver	304		
Registered electors		8,518		▼228
Turnout		4,645	54.53	▲9.29
Rejected ballots		9	0.19	▲0.01
Residents hold				
Residents hold				
Residents hold				

=== Upminster ===
Upminster (3)
Party	Candidate	Votes	%	±%
Residents	Linda Hawthorn*	3,007	68.38	▲25.02
Residents	Owen Ware*	3,001		
Residents	Muriel Mylod*	2,971		
Conservative	Eric Nicholls	875	19.76	▼21.90
Conservative	Guy Gower	870		
Conservative	Grace Cudby	850		
Labour	Stuart Brittain	533	11.86	▼3.12
Labour	David Hill	514		
Labour	Ann Georgiou	511		
Registered electors		8,459		▲16
Turnout		4,645	54.91	▼1.56
Rejected ballots		7	0.15	▼0.02
Residents hold				
Residents hold				
Residents hold				

== By-elections ==
There were no by-elections between the 1994 and 1998 elections.
