= Rise Park (ward) =

- Former electoral ward for the Havering London Borough Council
- Rise Park ward boundaries
- Borough: Havering
- County: Greater London
- Electorate: 5,881 (1998)
- Major settlements: Rise Park

Former electoral ward
- Created: 1978
- Abolished: 2002
- Councillors: 2

Rise Park was an electoral ward in the London Borough of Havering from 1978 to 2002. The ward was first used in the 1978 elections. It returned councillors to Havering London Borough Council.

== List of councillors ==
Term	Councillor	Party
1978–1980	Evan Davies	Conservative
1978–1994	Christopher Kemp	Conservative
1980–1986	Anthony Spencer	Conservative
1986–2000	Norman Symonds	Conservative
1994–1998	John Stevart	Conservative
1998–2002	Joseph Webster	Conservative
2000–2002	Gordon Scott-Morris	Conservative

== Havering council elections ==
=== 2000 by-election ===
The by-election took place on 15 June 2000, following the death of Norman Symonds.

2000 Rise Park by-election
Party	Candidate	Votes	%	±%
Conservative	Gordon Scott-Morris	990	58.1	+12.5
Residents	John Shrimpton	541	31.8	+0.4
Labour	Leonard Street	138	8.1	−14.9
Socialist Alliance	Peter Alder	34	2.0	+2.0
Majority		449	16.3	
Turnout		1,703	29.0	
Conservative hold		Swing		

=== 1998 election ===
The election on 7 May 1998 took place on the same day as the 1998 Greater London Authority referendum.

1998 Havering London Borough Council election : Rise Park
Party	Candidate	Votes	%	±%
Conservative	Norman Symonds	1,025		
Conservative	Joseph Webster	920		
Residents	John Shrimpton	706		
Residents	Michael Winter	702		
Labour	Alan Fenn	516		
Labour	Joseph Macveigh	465		
Turnout				
Conservative hold		Swing		
Conservative hold		Swing		

=== 1994 election ===
The election took place on 5 May 1994.

Rise Park
Party	Candidate	Votes	%	±%
Conservative	Norman Symonds	1,149	42.88	▼7.54
Conservative	John Stevart	1,105		
Labour	Pamela Craig	1,039	38.74	▲3.88
Labour	William Milbank	996		
Liberal Democrats	John Deeks	534	18.38	▲3.66
Liberal Democrats	Eden Mulliner	431		
Registered electors		5,849		▼119
Turnout		2,774	47.42	▼1.37
Rejected ballots		6	0.22	▲0.15
Conservative hold				
Conservative hold				

=== 1990 election ===
The election took place on 3 May 1990.

1990 Havering London Borough Council election: Rise Park
Party	Candidate	Votes	%	±%
Conservative	Christopher Kemp	1,394	50.42	
Conservative	Norman Symonds	1,394		
Labour	Neil Brindley	983	34.86	
Labour	Pamela Craig	945		
Liberal Democrats	John Deeks	407	14.72	
Liberal Democrats	Rosalyn Einchcomb	407		
Registered electors		5,968		
Turnout		2,912	48.79	
Rejected ballots		2	0.07	
Conservative hold		Swing		
Conservative hold		Swing		

=== 1986 election ===
The election took place on 8 May 1986.

1986 Havering London Borough Council election : Rise Park
Party	Candidate	Votes	%	±%
Conservative	Christopher Kemp	1,316		
Conservative	Norman Symonds	1,291		
Labour	David Ainsworth	518		
Labour	Anthony Larkin	514		
Alliance	John John	439		
Alliance	Peter Dorrington	378		
Turnout				
Conservative hold		Swing		
Conservative hold		Swing		

=== 1982 election ===
The election took place on 6 May 1982.

1982 Havering London Borough Council election : Rise Park
Party	Candidate	Votes	%	±%
Conservative	Christopher Kemp	1,824		
Conservative	Anthony Spencer	1,792		
Labour	David Ainsworth	562		
Labour	Keith Miller	485		
Turnout				
Conservative hold		Swing		
Conservative hold		Swing		

=== 1980 by-election ===
The by-election took place on 18 September 1980, following the death of Evan Davies.

1980 Rise Park by-election
Party	Candidate	Votes	%	±%
Conservative	Anthony Spencer	891		
Labour	Anthony Gordon	622		
Liberal	Terry Hurlstone	440		
Ind. Ratepayers	Clifford Edwards	119		
Turnout				
Conservative hold		Swing		

=== 1978 election ===
The election took place on 4 May 1978.

1978 Havering London Borough Council election: Rise Park
Party	Candidate	Votes	%	±%
Conservative	Evan Davies	1,876		
Conservative	Christopher Kemp	1,716		
Labour	Alfred Capon	545		
Labour	Sheila Hills	497		
Liberal	Terry Hurlstone	282		
Liberal	Caroline Hurlstone	278		
Turnout				
Conservative win (new seat)				
Conservative win (new seat)				
