= 1982 Havering London Borough Council election =

- 6 May 1982

All 63 Havering London Borough Council seats 32 seats needed for a majority
	First party	Second party
	CON	LAB
Party	Conservative	Labour
Seats won	37	12
Seat change	▼1	Steady
	Third party	Fourth party
	RES	LIB
Party	Residents	Alliance
Seats won	9 (Note: Includes all candidates elected as (Independent) Residents or Ratepayers)	5
Seat change	▼4	▲5

The 1982 Havering Council election took place on 6 May 1982 to elect members of Havering London Borough Council in London, England. The whole council was up for election and the Conservative Party stayed in overall control of the council.

== Electoral arrangements ==
The 1982 election used the ward boundaries established in 1978 for the second time. 63 councillors were elected from 25 wards. Each ward returned two or three councillors.

Polling took place on 6 May 1982.

== Results ==
The Conservative Party was re-elected, the first time a party in Havering was elected for a consecutive term with a majority of seats. The Labour Party retained the twelve seats they had won in 1978 covering the Harold Hill estate and the Airfield ward in Hornchurch. The Liberal Party (standing as SDP–Liberal Alliance candidates) won their first seats in a Havering election, taking all three seats in Rainham from the Residents and the two in Chase Cross from the Conservatives. The Conservative Party gained two of the three seats in South Hornchurch from the Residents and one seat went the other way in Upminster ward. This gave the Conservative Party 37 councillors, one less than in 1978.

== Ward results ==
=== Airfield ===
Airfield (3)
Party	Candidate	Votes	%	±%
Labour	Raymond Emmett	1,046		
Labour	Jack Hoepelman	1,036		
Labour	Rosina Purnell	993		
Conservative	Patrick Curtin	958		
Conservative	Martin Sinclair	940		
Conservative	Margaret Munday	922		
Alliance	Thomas Mitchell	792		
Alliance	Cynthia Matthews	771		
Alliance	Gordon Smith	693		
Turnout				
Labour hold		Swing		
Labour hold		Swing		
Labour hold		Swing		

=== Ardleigh Green ===
Ardleigh Green (2)
Party	Candidate	Votes	%	±%
Conservative	Ronald Latchford	1,607		
Conservative	Leonard Trott	1,576		
Alliance	Aidan Corish	374		
Alliance	William Barrett	351		
Labour	Jethro Farrant	636		
Labour	Anthony Hunt	554		
Turnout				
Conservative hold		Swing		
Conservative hold		Swing		

=== Brooklands ===
Brooklands (2)
Party	Candidate	Votes	%	±%
Conservative	Henry Tebbutt	1,271		
Conservative	Roland Vials	1,030		
Labour	William Harrison	697		
Labour	Michael Blake	690		
Alliance	Charles Brooks	520		
Alliance	Linda Foord	456		
Turnout				
Majority				
Conservative hold		Swing		
Conservative hold		Swing		

=== Chase Cross ===
Chase Cross (2)
Party	Candidate	Votes	%	±%
Alliance	Eric Freeman	941		
Alliance	Leonard Parmenter	912		
Conservative	Philip Brown	764		
Conservative	William Odulate	693		
Labour	Terence Muldoon	575		
Labour	Henry Webb	516		
National Front	Madeline Caine	35		
National Front	Roy Allman	34		
Turnout				
Alliance gain from Conservative		Swing		
Alliance gain from Conservative		Swing		

=== Collier Row ===
Collier Row (2)
Party	Candidate	Votes	%	±%
Conservative	Robin Adaire	984		
Conservative	Patrick Curtin	904		
Labour	Anthony Gordon	728		
Labour	Eileen Gordon	669		
Liberal Alliance FT	Edmund Longhorn	596		
Liberal Alliance FT	Angela Thompson	503		
Green	Andrew Smith	40		
Turnout				
Conservative hold		Swing		
Conservative hold		Swing		

=== Cranham East ===
Cranham East (2)
Party	Candidate	Votes	%	±%
Ind. Ratepayers	Rowland Knell	1,561		
Ind. Ratepayers	William Remfry	1,496		
Conservative	Peter Gardner	804		
Conservative	Pamela Marsden	696		
Labour	Betty O'Callaghan	294		
Labour	James Morton	293		
Turnout				
Ind. Ratepayers hold		Swing		
Ind. Ratepayers hold		Swing		

=== Cranham West ===
Cranham West (2)
Party	Candidate	Votes	%	±%
Ind. Ratepayers	Louisa Sinclair	1,687		
Ind. Ratepayers	Ron Ower	1,671		
Conservative	Owen Collins	1,031		
Conservative	Marigold Reilly	875		
Alliance	Ralph Gordon	295		
Labour	Dereck Marston	188		
Labour	Edward Reeder	180		
Turnout				
Ind. Ratepayers hold		Swing		
Ind. Ratepayers hold		Swing		

=== Elm Park ===
Elm Park (3)
Party	Candidate	Votes	%	±%
Conservative	Joan Arthur	1,678		
Conservative	Leslie Reilly	1,620		
Conservative	Ronald Woods	1,608		
Labour	George Saunders	1,357		
Labour	Sidney Jack	1,274		
Labour	Robert Kirchner	1,257		
Alliance	Winifred Clarke	1,151		
Alliance	Brian McCarthy	1,119		
Alliance	Cyril Wilkinson	1.072		
Turnout				
Conservative hold		Swing		
Conservative hold		Swing		
Conservative hold		Swing		

=== Emerson Park ===
Emerson Park (2)
Party	Candidate	Votes	%	±%
Conservative	Jack Moultrie	2,178		
Conservative	William Sibley	2,103		
Alliance	Malcolm Inman	753		
Alliance	Frederick Trotman	733		
Labour	Arthur Oliver	316		
Labour	Dereck Smith	269		
Turnout				
Majority				
Conservative hold		Swing		
Conservative hold		Swing		

=== Gidea Park ===
Gidea Park (2)
Party	Candidate	Votes	%	±%
Conservative	David Cure	1,964		
Conservative	Alice Smith	1,862		
Alliance	Margaret Lakeman	477		
Alliance	Terence Archer	472		
Labour	Christine Blake	231		
Labour	Anthony Gordon	220		
Turnout				
Majority				
Conservative hold		Swing		
Conservative hold		Swing		

=== Gooshays ===
Gooshays (3)
Party	Candidate	Votes	%	±%
Labour	Ronald Lynn	1,307		
Labour	Ronald Whitworth	1,211		
Labour	Wilf Mills	1,202		
Alliance	Peter Osborne	832		
Conservative	Frank Buckland	805		
Alliance	Joyce Robertson	794		
Alliance	Ian Goldsmith	792		
Conservative	Frank Hullyer	789		
Conservative	Doris Hullyer	778		
Turnout				
Labour hold		Swing		
Labour hold		Swing		
Labour hold		Swing		

=== Hacton ===
Hacton (3)
Party	Candidate	Votes	%	±%
Residents	Albert Davis	1,593		
Residents	Norman Miles	1,462		
Residents	Norman Richards	1,412		
Conservative	Dennis Bull	1,364		
Conservative	Margaret Ashby	1,231		
Conservative	Martin Smeaton	1,165		
Alliance	David Williams	672		
Alliance	John Hewitt	654		
Alliance	Mark Long	626		
Labour	William Howard	596		
Labour	Ernest Rawlins	595		
Labour	Arthur Eade	576		
Turnout				
Residents hold		Swing		
Residents hold		Swing		
Residents hold		Swing		

=== Harold Wood ===
Harold Wood (3)
Party	Candidate	Votes	%	±%
Conservative	David Forster	2,117		
Conservative	Bob Neill	2,037		
Conservative	Peter Marsden	1,976		
Alliance	Peter Fowler	799		
Alliance	Ronald Huckstep	755		
Labour	Joseph Moore	654		
Alliance	Graham Bridgeman-Clarke	630		
Labour	Sheila Hills	620		
Labour	Marjorie Ville	602		
Turnout				
Conservative hold		Swing		
Conservative hold		Swing		
Conservative hold		Swing		

=== Heath Park ===
Heath Park (2)
Party	Candidate	Votes	%	±%
Conservative	William Smith	1,766		
Conservative	Eric Munday	1,731		
Alliance	Susan Brewington	736		
Alliance	John Bates	712		
Labour	John Bowyer	363		
Labour	Jeanette Bowyer	354		
Turnout				
Conservative hold		Swing		
Conservative hold		Swing		

=== Heaton ===
Heaton (3)
Party	Candidate	Votes	%	±%
Labour	Denis O'Flynn	1,260		
Labour	Geoffrey Otter	1,227		
Labour	Ruby Latham	1,186		
Conservative	Helen Forster	857		
Conservative	Stephen Brabner	854		
Alliance	Barry Keates	836		
Conservative	Pamela Light	794		
Alliance	John Kiff	767		
Alliance	Donald Rogerson	748		
Turnout				
Labour hold		Swing		
Labour hold		Swing		
Labour hold		Swing		

=== Hilldene ===
Hilldene (3)
Party	Candidate	Votes	%	±%
Labour	Dennis Cook	1,380		
Labour	Reg Whiting	1,303		
Labour	Bessie Whitworth	1,258		
Conservative	David Ratcliffe	707		
Conservative	Marilyn Tonks	657		
Conservative	Shireen Sycamore	652		
Turnout				
Labour hold		Swing		
Labour hold		Swing		
Labour hold		Swing		

=== Hylands ===
Hylands (3)
Party	Candidate	Votes	%	±%
Conservative	Gerald Clarke	1,498		
Conservative	Olive Baruch	1,354		
Conservative	Irene Pearce	1,344		
Residents	Alan Prescott	955		
Residents	Colin Scott	927		
Residents	Brian Parker	926		
Labour	Stephen Clarke	880		
Labour	Colin Stickland	871		
Labour	Jess Taylor	871		
Alliance	Norma Kirkman	569		
Alliance	William Halliday	568		
Alliance	Brian Aldridge	560		
Turnout				
Conservative hold		Swing		
Conservative hold		Swing		
Conservative hold		Swing		

=== Mawney ===
Mawney (3)
Party	Candidate	Votes	%	±%
Conservative	Kenneth Roe	1,734		
Conservative	Winifred Whittingham	1,726		
Conservative	Meirion Owens	1,676		
Labour	George Cox	1,126		
Labour	Peter Johnson	1,049		
Labour	Cyril Whitelock	1,005		
Alliance	Pauline Longhorn	727		
Alliance	Mary Nudd	695		
Alliance	Keith Brewington	594		
Turnout				
Conservative hold		Swing		
Conservative hold		Swing		
Conservative hold		Swing		

=== Oldchurch ===
Oldchurch (2)
Party	Candidate	Votes	%	±%
Conservative	Derek Price	812		
Conservative	William Todd	787		
Labour	Ronald Baker	513		
Labour	Robert Kilbey	450		
Alliance	Paul Kelly	415		
Alliance	Margaret Snaith	337		
Turnout				
Conservative hold		Swing		
Conservative hold		Swing		

=== Rainham ===
Rainham (3)
Party	Candidate	Votes	%	±%
Alliance	Mary Ball	2,154		
Alliance	Mary Davies	2,139		
Alliance	Paul Long	2,102		
Residents	Henry Turner	826		
Residents	Donald Poole	772		
Conservative	William North	763		
Conservative	Audrey North	734		
Labour	Norma Emmerson	716		
Labour	Roy Matthews	663		
Conservative	Rachel Reilly	631		
Labour	Christine Watson	593		
Turnout				
Alliance gain from Residents		Swing		
Alliance gain from Residents		Swing		
Alliance gain from Residents		Swing		

=== Rise Park ===
Rise Park (2)
Party	Candidate	Votes	%	±%
Conservative	Christopher Kemp	1,824		
Conservative	Anthony Spencer	1,792		
Labour	David Ainsworth	562		
Labour	Keith Miller	485		
Turnout				
Conservative hold		Swing		
Conservative hold		Swing		

=== St Andrew's ===
St Andrew's (3)
Party	Candidate	Votes	%	±%
Conservative	Arthur Cotier	1,960		
Conservative	Albert James	1,951		
Conservative	Thomas Orrin	1,801		
Alliance	Adrienne McCarthy	1,099		
Alliance	Martin Heazell	1,018		
Residents	Patrick Phelps	963		
Alliance	Trevor Wood	936		
Labour	Keith Dutton	625		
Labour	Margaret Jack	555		
Labour	Margaret Hoepelman	530		
Turnout				
Conservative hold		Swing		
Conservative hold		Swing		
Conservative hold		Swing		

=== St Edward's ===
St Edward's (2)
Party	Candidate	Votes	%	±%
Conservative	Lydia Hutton	1,329		
Conservative	Roger Ramsey	1,324		
Alliance	Keith Penfold	476		
Alliance	Michael Long	465		
Labour	Patrick Gilley	348		
Labour	Frederick Kaler	328		
Turnout				
Conservative hold		Swing		
Conservative hold		Swing		

=== South Hornchurch ===
South Hornchurch (3)
Party	Candidate	Votes	%	±%
Residents	Leonard Long	1,029		
Conservative	Ann Cockerton	981		
Conservative	James Allum	979		
Residents	Peter Thwaites	912		
Residents	Ronald Whittaker	908		
Labour	Lucy Bolstridge	891		
Labour	Richard Desmond	890		
Conservative	Pauline Orrin	874		
Labour	Keith Darvill	869		
Alliance	Harry Rivers	594		
Alliance	William Tyrell	590		
Alliance	Ivor Cameron	567		
Turnout				
Residents hold		Swing		
Conservative gain from Residents		Swing		
Conservative gain from Residents		Swing		

=== Upminster ===
Upminster (3)
Party	Candidate	Votes	%	±%
Ratepayers	Geoffrey Lewis	2,090		
Conservative	Norman Kemble	2,016		
Conservative	Jean Frost	2,000		
Ratepayers	Joan Lewis	1,974		
Ratepayers	Owen Ware	1,926		
Conservative	Doreen White	1,894		
Alliance	Martin Taylor	464		
Alliance	Anthony Gunton	439		
Alliance	Rodney Dorken	429		
Labour	David Burn	246		
Labour	Peter Baines	237		
Labour	Glyn Harris	226		
Turnout				
Ratepayers hold		Swing		
Conservative hold		Swing		
Conservative hold		Swing		

== By-elections ==
The following by-elections took place between the 1982 and 1986 elections:

- 1983 Rainham by-election
- 1983 Ardleigh Green by-election
- 1983 Heath Park by-election
- 1983 Hylands by-election
- 1983 Mawney by-election
- 1985 Rainham by-election
