= Havering Residents Association =

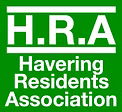
- Abbreviation: HRA
- Leader: Ray Morgon
- Chair: Gillian Ford
- Founded: 16 March 1900; 126 years ago (as the Hornchurch Ratepayers' Association)
- Registered: 2000
- Headquarters: 115 Havering Road, Romford, RM1 4RB
- Member associations: Emerson Park; Hornchurch; Rainham and Wennington; South Hornchurch and Beam Park; Upminster and Cranham
- Ideology: Localism
- Political position: Big tent
- Havering London Borough Council: 11 / 55

Website
- www.haveringra.org

Havering Residents Association (HRA) is a group of residents' associations and registered political party in London, England. It is active in the London Borough of Havering. As of 2026, it forms the eleven-councillor opposition group of Havering London Borough Council. At the 2026 elections it was the largest elected residents group in London. Not all associations in Havering are affiliated with the HRA, usually indicating this by standing as "Independent Residents Association" candidates. The Harold Wood Hill Park Residents Association was part of the HRA until 2019. The HRA has its origins in ratepayers' associations that became active in the early 20th century, including the Hornchurch Ratepayers' Association that was founded on 16 March 1900 and Upminster and Cranham Ratepayers' Association that was founded on 4 January 1906.

== History ==
The political party has its origins in the Hornchurch Ratepayers' Association, which was founded at a meeting at the Hornchurch board school on 16 March 1900. The founding of the ratepayers' association was motivated by the increase in rates charged by various bodies over the preceding four years. Officers were elected on 29 March 1900, rules were adopted and general meetings were planned for four times a year. The first of these was held on 13 June 1900. The association planned to select candidates for the Hornchurch Parish Council, Romford Rural District Council and Hornchurch School Board elections. (Note: School boards were abolished in 1902.) It was organised based on the four wards of Hornchurch parish and meetings were held in each of them. (Note: The wards were Harold Wood, North West, South and Village.) In September 1901 the association had a membership of 30. By 1904 they had one member on Romford Rural District Council and several members on Hornchurch Parish Council. At a meeting on 23 March 1904 the president summarised what the association had achieved since being created, this included capping the increase of salary of the parish clerk and reducing the budget for the Hornchurch fire station.

As the population was rising and Hornchurch was being built upon, in 1902, the parish council took steps to convert the parish to an urban district and this was opposed by the Hornchurch association. Fearing it would increase the rates, the association opposed gaining urban powers again in 1911 and 1925. Following the creation of the Hornchurch Urban District Council in 1926 the association contested elections to it, and controlled the council after the first election. In 1934 Hornchurch expanded to include Cranham and Upminster, which brought another HRA predecessor within the district, the Upminster and Cranham Ratepayers' Association. A first meeting had been held on 15 July 1905, but it was not formally created until 28 founding members joined at another meeting on 4 January 1906. It was intended that it would work in cooperation with other associations in the district and would produce a regular publication "containing reports of the doings of local authorities". Following the Second World War the council was dominated by the major political parties, but from 1961 to 1965 it was in no-overall control with the ratepayers as the largest group.

== Havering London Borough Council ==
The residents association is represented on Havering London Borough Council. Until May 2026, they were the largest group on the council and ran it as a minority administration. Between 2022 and 2024, they ran the council in coalition with the Labour Party. They lost control to Reform in May 2026. HRA said comments Reform made about Havering possibly leaving the Greater London Authority were misleading, as that decision is not controlled by the council.

=== Member associations ===
As of January 2026, member bodies are:

- Residents Association of Emerson Park (registered as part of HRA)
- Hornchurch Residents Association (separately registered)
- South Hornchurch and Beam Park Residents Association (registered as part of HRA)
- Upminster and Cranham Residents Association (separately registered)
- Rainham and Wennington Residents Association (registered as part of HRA)

Former members include:

- Harold Wood Hill Park Residents Association (disassociated 2019)

=== 2010 election ===
Result of the 2010 election, Havering RA in dark green

At the 2010 London borough council elections the Havering Residents Association stood candidates in 15 of the 18 wards in Havering. 12 of the 45 candidates were elected as councillors. The following were elected/stood in each ward of Havering:

2010 Havering London Borough Council election
Residents association	Ward	Results
Collier Row and Mawneys	Havering Park	0 / 3
Collier Row and Mawneys	Mawneys	0 / 3
Elm Park	Elm Park	0 / 3
Harold Wood Hill Park	Gooshays	0 / 3
Harold Wood Hill Park	Harold Wood	1 / 3
Harold Wood Hill Park	Heaton	0 / 3
Havering	Squirrel's Heath	0 / 3
Havering	Emerson Park	0 / 3
Hornchurch	Hacton	3 / 3
Hornchurch	Hylands	0 / 3
Hornchurch	St Andrew's	2 / 3
Romford	Pettits	0 / 3
Romford	Romford Town	0 / 3
Upminster and Cranham	Cranham	3 / 3
Upminster and Cranham	Upminster	3 / 3

They did not have candidates in Rainham and Wennington, or South Hornchurch where other residents groups had candidates. Councillors elected from those wards formed a separate Independent Residents Group on Havering Council. No residents candidates stood in Brooklands.

=== 2014 election ===
Result of the 2014 election, Havering RA in dark green

At the 2014 London borough council elections the Havering Residents Association stood candidates in 11 of the 18 wards, with 31 candidates of which 19 were elected. The following were elected/stood in each ward of Havering:

2014 Havering London Borough Council election
Residents association	Ward	Results
Harold Wood Hill Park	Gooshays	0 / 2
Harold Wood Hill Park	Harold Wood	3 / 3
Havering	Squirrel's Heath	0 / 3
Havering	Emerson Park	0 / 3
Hornchurch	Elm Park	3 / 3
Hornchurch	Hacton	3 / 3
Hornchurch	Hylands	1 / 3
Hornchurch	St Andrew's	3 / 3
Pettits	Pettits	0 / 3
Upminster and Cranham	Cranham	3 / 3
Upminster and Cranham	Upminster	3 / 3

They did not have candidates in Brooklands, Havering Park, Heaton or Mawneys. In Rainham and Wennington "Independent Residents Association" candidates stood and were elected.

In 2014 eight members of the Havering Residents Association group, including the leader Clarence Barrett, split off to form East Havering Residents Association Group. (Note: The East Havering Residents Association Group consisted of Ron Ower, Linda Hawthorn and Linda Van den Hende (all from Upminster ward), Alex Donald, Brian Eagling and Darren Wise (Harold Wood ward) and Clarence Barrett and Gillian Ford (Cranham ward).) This group then formed a leadership coalition with the Conservatives.

=== 2018 election ===
Result of the 2018 election, Havering RA in dark green

At the 2018 elections the Havering Residents Association stood candidates in 12 of the 18 wards, with 35 candidates of which 17 were elected. The following were elected/stood in each ward of Havering:

2018 Havering London Borough Council election
Residents association	Ward	Results
Harold Wood Hill Park	Gooshays	0 / 3
Harold Wood Hill Park	Harold Wood	3 / 3
Havering	Squirrel's Heath	0 / 3
Havering	Emerson Park	0 / 3
Havering	Mawneys	0 / 2
Hornchurch	Elm Park	3 / 3
Hornchurch	Hacton	3 / 3
Hornchurch	Hylands	0 / 3
Hornchurch	St Andrew's	2 / 3
Pettits	Pettits	0 / 3
Upminster and Cranham	Cranham	3 / 3
Upminster and Cranham	Upminster	3 / 3

They did not have candidates in Brooklands, Havering Park or Heaton wards. In Rainham and Wennington "Independent Residents Association" candidates stood and were elected.

In 2019, Harold Wood Hill Park Residents Association ceased to be associated with the HRA and the party registration was updated to include 'independent' as part of registered emblems and descriptions.

=== 2022 election ===
Result of the 2022 election, Havering RA in dark green

The wards in Havering were redrawn for the 2022 elections. The Havering Residents Association stood candidates in 17 of the 20 wards, with 44 candidates of which 18 were elected. The following were elected/stood in each ward of Havering:

2022 Havering London Borough Council election
Residents association	Ward	Results
Havering	Emerson Park	2 / 2
Havering	Gooshays	0 / 2
Havering	Harold Wood	0 / 3
Havering	Havering-atte-Bower	0 / 1
Havering	Heaton	0 / 2
Havering	Marshalls and Rise Park	0 / 3
Havering	Mawneys	0 / 3
Havering	Rush Green and Crowlands	0 / 3
Havering	Squirrels Heath	0 / 3
Havering	St Alban's	0 / 2
Havering	St Edward's	0 / 3
Hornchurch	Elm Park	3 / 3
Hornchurch	Hacton	2 / 2
Hornchurch	Hylands and Harrow Lodge	2 / 2
Hornchurch	St Andrew's	3 / 3
Upminster and Cranham	Cranham	3 / 3
Upminster and Cranham	Upminster	3 / 3

They did not have candidates in Beam Park, Rainham & Wennington or South Hornchurch wards.

Between the 2022 and 2026 elections, there were defections which brought the number of HRA councillors to 25:

- In Cranham ward, two HRA councillors (John Tyler and Philip Ruck) did not join the HRA group on the council (Note: John Tyler and Philip Ruck formed the Residents' Association Independent Group on the council.)
- In Gooshays ward, Paul McGeary changed parties from Labour to HRA in 2024
- In Havering-atte-Bower ward, John Crowder changed parties from Conservative to HRA in 2024
- In Hylands and Harrow Lodge ward, Christine Smith changed parties from Conservative to HRA in 2024
- In Marshalls and Rise Park ward, two councillors (Philippa Crowder and Robby Misir) changed parties from Conservative to HRA in 2024
- In Rainham and Wennington ward, three councillors (Jacqueline McArdle, Susan Ospreay and Sarah Edwards) changed parties from Conservative to HRA in 2022, following the Wennington wildfire. Jacqueline McArdle changed back to Conservative in 2024
- In South Hornchurch ward, two councillors (Graham Williamson and Natasha Summers) elected as "Independent Residents Association" joined the HRA group on the council

The HRA formed a coalition with Labour after the 2022 election. It came to an end in June 2024 and they then formed a minority administration.

=== 2026 election ===
Result of the 2026 election, Havering RA in dark green

At the 2026 elections the Havering Residents Association stood candidates in 19 of the 20 wards, with 52 candidates of which 11 were elected. The following were elected/stood in each ward of Havering:

2026 Havering London Borough Council election
Residents association	Ward	Results
Havering	Beam Park	0 / 2
Havering	Emerson Park	0 / 2
Havering	Gooshays	0 / 2
Havering	Harold Wood	0 / 3
Havering	Havering-atte-Bower	0 / 1
Havering	Heaton	0 / 2
Havering	Marshalls and Rise Park	0 / 3
Havering	Mawneys	0 / 3
Havering	Rush Green and Crowlands	0 / 3
Havering	Squirrels Heath	0 / 3
Havering	St Alban's	0 / 2
Havering	St Edward's	0 / 3
Havering	Rainham & Wennington	1 / 3
Havering	South Hornchurch	0 / 2
Hornchurch	Elm Park	3 / 3
Hornchurch	Hacton	1 / 2
Hornchurch	Hylands and Harrow Lodge	0 / 3
Hornchurch	St Andrew's	0 / 3
Upminster and Cranham	Cranham	3 / 3
Upminster and Cranham	Upminster	3 / 3

They did not have candidates in the Harold Wood ward.

== London Assembly ==
Havering Residents Association stood a candidate for the Havering and Redbridge constituency at the 2000 London Assembly elections and received 12,831 votes. It has not contested any further London Assembly elections.
