= Maney (disambiguation) =

Maney is an area in England.

Maney may also refer to:

- Maney, Minnesota, a community in the United States
- Maney Publishing, a publishing company
- Maney (surname), a list of people with the surname Maney
