= 2010 Havering London Borough Council election =

2010 local election in England

- 6 May 2010

All 54 Havering London Borough Council seats 27 seats needed for a majority
- Map of the results of the 2010 Havering council election. Conservatives in blue, Havering Residents Association in dark green, Labour in red and Residents Association in grey.

Elections for Havering London Borough Council were held on 6 May 2010. The 2010 General Election and other local elections took place on the same day.

In London council elections the entire council is elected every four years, opposed to some local elections where one councillor is elected every year for three of the four years.

== Electoral arrangements ==
Ward boundaries established in 2002 were used for the third time. 54 councillors were elected from 18 wards. Each ward returned three councillors.

Polling took place on 6 May 2010.

== Results ==
Havering Council election result 2010
| Party | Seats | Gains | Losses | Net gain/loss | Seats % | Votes % | Votes | +/− |
|---|---|---|---|---|---|---|---|---|
| Conservative | 33 | 1 | 2 | -1 | 61.1 | 36.2 | 46,282 | -0.5 |
| Havering Residents Association | 16 | 1 | 1 | 0 | 29.6 | 27.9 | 35,586 | -2.7 |
| Labour | 5 | 3 | - | +3 | 9.3 | 18.8 | 24,035 | +3.4 |
| UKIP | 0 | - | - | - | - | 7.5 | 9,535 | +3.5 |
| BNP | 0 | - | 1 | -1 | - | 3.2 | 4,077 | +1.0 |
| Liberal Democrats | 0 | - | - | - | - | 2.6 | 3,329 | +0.2 |
| Independent | 0 | - | - | - | - | 2.1 | 2,738 | -1.2 |
| Green | 0 | - | - | - | - | 1.5 | 1,953 | -1.0 |
| National Liberal | 0 | - | - | - | - | 0.2 | 291 | -2.7 |

== Ward results ==
=== Brooklands ===
Brooklands (3)
| Party | Candidate | Votes | % | ±% |
|---|---|---|---|---|
| Conservative | Robert Benham | 3,026 | | |
| Conservative | Frederick Osborne | 2,905 | | |
| Conservative | Henry Tebbutt | 2,776 | | |
| Labour | Eamonn Mahon | 1,967 | | |
| Labour | Daniel Young | 1,783 | | |
| Labour | John Reid | 1,748 | | |
| Liberal Democrats | Peter Davies | 1,346 | | |
| Liberal Democrats | Madge Mulliner | 1,088 | | |
| Liberal Democrats | Karen Kruzycka | 1,063 | | |
| Turnout | | | | |
| Conservative hold | | Swing | | |
| Conservative hold | | Swing | | |
| Conservative hold | | Swing | | |

=== Cranham ===
Cranham (3)
| Party | Candidate | Votes | % | ±% |
|---|---|---|---|---|
| Residents | Gillian Ford | 4,160 | | |
| Residents | June Alexander | 4,120 | | |
| Residents | Clarence Barrett | 3,923 | | |
| Conservative | Jacqueline Long | 2,202 | | |
| Conservative | Pamela Freer | 2,085 | | |
| Conservative | Terence Monk | 1,993 | | |
| Labour | John Mckernan | 635 | | |
| Labour | Patrick Chalk | 625 | | |
| UKIP | Sunita Webb | 482 | | |
| Labour | Diane Diane | 445 | | |
| Green | Peter Caton | 412 | | |
| Independent | Maureen Doman | 94 | | |
| Turnout | | | | |
| Residents hold | | Swing | | |
| Residents hold | | Swing | | |
| Residents hold | | Swing | | |

=== Elm Park ===
Elm Park (3)
| Party | Candidate | Votes | % | ±% |
|---|---|---|---|---|
| Conservative | Malcolm Brace | 2,375 | | |
| Conservative | Barry Oddy | 2,272 | | |
| Conservative | Jeremy Evans | 2,213 | | |
| Labour | Graham Carr | 1,949 | | |
| Labour | Ian James | 1,699 | | |
| Labour | Susan Jiggens | 1,639 | | |
| BNP | Peter Clover | 977 | | |
| BNP | Anthony Easton | 861 | | |
| Residents | Ronald Shipton | 761 | | |
| BNP | Kenneth Seager | 739 | | |
| UKIP | Craig Litwin | 724 | | |
| Residents | Brian Long | 667 | | |
| Residents | Terence Matthews | 597 | | |
| National Liberal | Graham Littlechild | 291 | | |
| National Liberal | Madelaine Marsden | 250 | | |
| Green | Amanda Haines | 232 | | |
| Green | Gerald Haines | 203 | | |
| Turnout | | | | |
| Conservative hold | | Swing | | |
| Conservative hold | | Swing | | |
| Conservative hold | | Swing | | |

=== Emerson Park ===
Emerson Park (3)
| Party | Candidate | Votes | % | ±% |
|---|---|---|---|---|
| Conservative | Roger Ramsey | 3,851 | | |
| Conservative | Steven Kelly | 3,507 | | |
| Conservative | Paul Rochford | 3,331 | | |
| Labour | Julia Darvill | 1,238 | | |
| Residents | Joan Kaye | 1,221 | | |
| Labour | Christopher Purnell | 1,139 | | |
| Labour | Neil Brindley | 1,133 | | |
| Residents | Irene Eagling | 1,094 | | |
| UKIP | John Glanville | 1,007 | | |
| Residents | Nina Willers | 985 | | |
| Independent | Nakkeeran Arasaratnam | 146 | | |
| Independent | Ronald Lockhart | 130 | | |
| Turnout | | | | |
| Conservative hold | | Swing | | |
| Conservative hold | | Swing | | |
| Conservative hold | | Swing | | |

=== Gooshays ===
Gooshays (3)
| Party | Candidate | Votes | % | ±% |
|---|---|---|---|---|
| Labour | Patrick Murray | 1,869 | | |
| Conservative | Dennis Bull | 1,682 | | |
| Conservative | Keith Wells | 1,614 | | |
| Labour | Jeffrey Stafford | 1,603 | | |
| Labour | Ilaria Agostini | 1,562 | | |
| Conservative | Marcus Llewellyn-Rothschild | 1,551 | | |
| BNP | Antony Steff | 1,445 | | |
| BNP | Kelly Steff | 1,346 | | |
| UKIP | Bryan Woolerton | 944 | | |
| Residents | Graham Dickinson-Smith | 616 | | |
| Residents | Lucia Wise | 509 | | |
| Residents | Jonathon Holt | 390 | | |
| Turnout | | | | |
| Labour gain from BNP | | Swing | | |
| Conservative hold | | Swing | | |
| Conservative hold | | Swing | | |

=== Hacton ===
Hacton (3)
| Party | Candidate | Votes | % | ±% |
|---|---|---|---|---|
| Residents | Ray Morgon | 3,227 | | |
| Residents | Barbara Matthews | 3,172 | | |
| Residents | Louis Dodin | 3,080 | | |
| Conservative | Patricia Baumber | 2,165 | | |
| Conservative | Christine Mckenzie | 1,985 | | |
| Conservative | Ruth Edes | 1,857 | | |
| Labour | Edward Baglin | 887 | | |
| Labour | Allen Roach | 801 | | |
| Labour | Kathleen Vann | 768 | | |
| UKIP | Anthony Whitenstall | 750 | | |
| Green | David Beesley | 342 | | |
| Independent | Sally Logan | 161 | | |
| Independent | Joan Morrison | 109 | | |
| Independent | Jade Jackson | 98 | | |
| Turnout | | | | |
| Residents hold | | Swing | | |
| Residents hold | | Swing | | |
| Residents hold | | Swing | | |

=== Harold Wood ===
Harold Wood (3)
| Party | Candidate | Votes | % | ±% |
|---|---|---|---|---|
| Residents | Brian Eagling | 2,133 | | |
| Conservative | Lesley Kelly | 1,958 | | |
| Conservative | Pamela Light | 1,868 | | |
| Residents | Darren Wise | 1,848 | | |
| Residents | Julia Rogers | 1,819 | | |
| Conservative | John Clark | 1,738 | | |
| Liberal Democrats | Jonathan Coles | 1,347 | | |
| Liberal Democrats | Pamela Coles | 1,330 | | |
| Liberal Democrats | Ian Sanderson | 1,074 | | |
| Labour | Ken Clark | 962 | | |
| Labour | Ben Hetchin | 848 | | |
| Labour | Sean Willis | 812 | | |
| UKIP | Lawrence Webb | 762 | | |
| Independent | Cyril Doman | 117 | | |
| Independent | Cynthia Shellito | 62 | | |
| Turnout | | | | |
| Residents gain from Liberal Democrats | | Swing | | |
| Conservative hold | | Swing | | |
| Conservative hold | | Swing | | |

=== Havering Park ===
Havering Park
| Party | Candidate | Votes | % | ±% |
|---|---|---|---|---|
| Conservative | Billy Taylor | 2,910 | | |
| Conservative | Sandra Binion | 2,889 | | |
| Conservative | Geoffrey Starns | 2,849 | | |
| Residents | Andrew Mann | 1,814 | | |
| Residents | Denis Stevens | 1,451 | | |
| Residents | Kevin Tonks | 1,373 | | |
| Labour | Peter Mcinerney | 853 | | |
| Labour | John Mccole | 806 | | |
| Labour | Irene Stacey | 769 | | |
| UKIP | Edward Martin | 729 | | |
| Turnout | | | | |
| Conservative hold | | | | |
| Conservative hold | | | | |
| Conservative gain from Residents | | Swing | | |

=== Heaton ===
Heaton (3)
| Party | Candidate | Votes | % | ±% |
|---|---|---|---|---|
| Labour | Keith Darvill | 1,823 | | |
| Labour | Denis O'Flynn | 1,739 | | |
| Labour | Paul Mcgeary | 1,696 | | |
| Conservative | Christine Fox | 1,614 | | |
| Conservative | Patricia Clark | 1,566 | | |
| Conservative | Christopher Ryan | 1,521 | | |
| BNP | Michael Braun | 954 | | |
| BNP | William Whelpley | 945 | | |
| UKIP | Ian De Wulverton | 810 | | |
| Residents | Mark Kettley | 459 | | |
| Residents | Anne Anne | 363 | | |
| Residents | Peter Willers | 306 | | |
| Turnout | | | | |
| Labour gain from Conservative | | Swing | | |
| Labour hold | | Swing | | |
| Labour gain from Conservative | | Swing | | |

=== Hylands ===
Hylands (3)
| Party | Candidate | Votes | % | ±% |
|---|---|---|---|---|
| Conservative | Georgina Galpin | 3,102 | | |
| Conservative | Peter Gardner | 2,815 | | |
| Conservative | Damian White | 2,661 | | |
| Residents | Jeremy Wilkes | 2,094 | | |
| Residents | Raymond Coomer | 1,994 | | |
| Residents | Paul Wilson | 1,879 | | |
| Labour | Sarah Alison | 1,326 | | |
| Labour | Herbert White | 1,141 | | |
| Labour | Michael Agunbiade | 1,005 | | |
| UKIP | Terry Murray | 967 | | |
| Green | David Voak | 437 | | |
| Turnout | | | | |
| Conservative hold | | Swing | | |
| Conservative hold | | Swing | | |
| Conservative hold | | Swing | | |

=== Mawneys ===
Mawneys (3)
| Party | Candidate | Votes | % | ±% |
|---|---|---|---|---|
| Conservative | Linda Trew | 2,962 | | |
| Conservative | Melvin Wallace | 2,801 | | |
| Conservative | Osman Dervish | 2,778 | | |
| Residents | Derek Price | 1,804 | | |
| Residents | Karen Price | 1,718 | | |
| Residents | Joseph Webster | 1,585 | | |
| Labour | Susan Maker | 1,462 | | |
| Labour | Daniel Nichols | 1,412 | | |
| Labour | Jeffrey Porter | 1,316 | | |
| BNP | Raymond Underwood | 701 | | |
| Turnout | | | | |
| Conservative hold | | Swing | | |
| Conservative hold | | Swing | | |
| Conservative hold | | Swing | | |

=== Pettits ===
Pettits (3)
| Party | Candidate | Votes | % | ±% |
|---|---|---|---|---|
| Conservative | Michael Armstrong | 3,707 | | |
| Conservative | Edward Eden | 3,572 | | |
| Conservative | Robby Misir | 3,032 | | |
| Residents | Peter Goldsmith | 2,398 | | |
| Residents | Ian Wilkes | 2,395 | | |
| Residents | Philip Wailing | 2,045 | | |
| Labour | Siobhan Mcgeary | 963 | | |
| Labour | Sean Rogers | 916 | | |
| Labour | Ben Kilpatrick | 890 | | |
| Turnout | | | | |
| Conservative hold | | Swing | | |
| Conservative hold | | Swing | | |
| Conservative hold | | Swing | | |

=== Rainham and Wennington ===
Rainham and Wennington (3)
| Party | Candidate | Votes | % | ±% |
|---|---|---|---|---|
| Ind. Residents | Jeffrey Tucker | 3,406 | | |
| Ind. Residents | Mark Logan | 1,779 | | |
| Ind. Residents | David Durant | 1,707 | | |
| Labour | Anthony Ellis | 1,621 | | |
| Independent | Coral Jeffery | 1,599 | | |
| Conservative | Sharon Edwards | 1,166 | | |
| Conservative | Paul Cockling | 1,105 | | |
| Independent | Mark Stewart | 1,075 | | |
| Labour | Martin Earley | 1,042 | | |
| Labour | Michael Hitchin | 1,008 | | |
| Conservative | Matthew Walsh | 903 | | |
| Turnout | | | | |
| Ind. Residents hold | | Swing | | |
| Ind. Residents hold | | Swing | | |
| Ind. Residents hold | | Swing | | |

=== Romford Town ===
Romford Town (3)
| Party | Candidate | Votes | % | ±% |
|---|---|---|---|---|
| Conservative | Andrew Curtin | 3,198 | | |
| Conservative | Wendy Brice-Thompson | 3,186 | | |
| Conservative | Frederick Thompson | 2,993 | | |
| Labour | James Maker | 1,612 | | |
| Labour | Pervez Badruddin | 1,564 | | |
| Labour | Olajide Omotayo | 1,518 | | |
| Residents | Duncan Macpherson | 1,173 | | |
| Residents | Julie Porter | 1,149 | | |
| Residents | Edward Mckiernan | 1,123 | | |
| Turnout | | | | |
| Conservative hold | | Swing | | |
| Conservative hold | | Swing | | |
| Conservative hold | | Swing | | |

=== St Andrew's ===
St Andrew's (3)
| Party | Candidate | Votes | % | ±% |
|---|---|---|---|---|
| Conservative | Garry Pain | 2,397 | | |
| Residents | John Mylod | 2,394 | | |
| Residents | John Wood | 2,370 | | |
| Conservative | Robert Perry | 2,342 | | |
| Residents | Michael Winter | 2,264 | | |
| Conservative | Gloria Passannante | 1,977 | | |
| Labour | Georgina Carr | 1,088 | | |
| Labour | Graham Bramley | 1,032 | | |
| Labour | Janet Davis | 997 | | |
| UKIP | Gregory Mangham | 881 | | |
| Liberal Democrats | Peter Spence | 636 | | |
| Liberal Democrats | Geoffrey Coles | 609 | | |
| Liberal Democrats | Keith Taffs | 493 | | |
| Green | Danuta Gorzynska-Hart | 357 | | |
| Independent | Leonard Swallow | 122 | | |
| Independent | Frederick Jerrett | 119 | | |
| Turnout | | | | |
| Conservative gain from Residents | | Swing | | |
| Residents gain from Conservative | | Swing | | |
| Residents hold | | Swing | | |

=== South Hornchurch ===
South Hornchurch (3)
| Party | Candidate | Votes | % | ±% |
|---|---|---|---|---|
| Conservative | Rebbecca Bennett | 1,947 | | |
| Ind. Residents | Michael-Deon Burton | 1,942 | | |
| Labour | Denis Breading | 1,746 | | |
| Conservative | Daniel Hatch | 1,659 | | |
| Ind. Residents | Keith Roberts | 1,651 | | |
| Labour | Stephen Jaques | 1,596 | | |
| Labour | Bryan Vincent | 1,540 | | |
| Conservative | Vidyotama Persaud | 1,483 | | |
| Ind. Residents | Graham Williamson | 1,453 | | |
| UKIP | James Fellowes | 892 | | |
| Independent | Wendy Buck | 449 | | |
| Turnout | | | | |
| Conservative hold | | Swing | | |
| Residents gain from Independent | | Swing | | |
| Labour hold | | Swing | | |

=== Squirrel's Heath ===
Squirrel's Heath (3)
| Party | Candidate | Votes | % | ±% |
|---|---|---|---|---|
| Conservative | Lynden Thorpe | 4,081 | | |
| Conservative | Eric Munday | 4,021 | | |
| Conservative | Michael White | 3,699 | | |
| Labour | Anne-Marie Ducker | 1,292 | | |
| Labour | Craig Bourne | 1,241 | | |
| Residents | John Shrimpton | 1,113 | | |
| Residents | Ann Webster | 1,112 | | |
| Labour | Olanipe Fayokun | 1,101 | | |
| Residents | Colin Maston | 1,046 | | |
| Turnout | | | | |
| Conservative hold | | Swing | | |
| Conservative hold | | Swing | | |
| Conservative hold | | Swing | | |

=== Upminster ===
Upminster (3)
| Party | Candidate | Votes | % | ±% |
|---|---|---|---|---|
| Residents | Ron Ower | 4,871 | | |
| Residents | Linda Hawthorn | 4,839 | | |
| Residents | Linda Van den Hende | 4,603 | | |
| Conservative | Catherine Bull | 1,939 | | |
| Conservative | Alan Bruniges | 1,636 | | |
| Conservative | Alexander Mckenzie | 1,378 | | |
| Labour | Simon Darvill | 742 | | |
| UKIP | Thomas Mulcahy | 587 | | |
| Labour | Margaret Lindsay | 531 | | |
| Labour | Rachel Harris | 531 | | |
| Green | Melanie Collins | 173 | | |
| Green | Philip Butler | 71 | | |
| Green | Ian Pirie | 65 | | |
| Independent | Ena Risby | 50 | | |
| Turnout | | | | |
| Residents hold | | Swing | | |
| Residents hold | | Swing | | |
| Residents hold | | Swing | | |

== By-elections ==
The following by-election took place between the 2010 and 2014 elections:

- 2013 Gooshays by-election (UKIP gain from Conservative)
