= 2014 Havering London Borough Council election =

2014 local election in England

- 22 May 2014

All 54 Havering London Borough Council seats 27 seats needed for a majority

	First party	Second party	Third party
Party	Conservative	Havering Residents Association	UKIP
Last election	33 seats, 36.2%	16 seats, 27.9%	0 seats, 7.5%
Seats before	33	12	0
Seats won	22	19	7
Seat change	▼11	▲7	▲7
Popular vote	60,063	58,381	43,040
Percentage	27.7%	26.9%	19.9%
Swing	▼8.5%	▼1.0%	▲12.4%
	Fourth party	Fifth party
Party	Independent Residents Group	Labour
Last election	Did not stand	5 seats, 18.8%
Seats before	4	5
Seats won	5	1
Seat change	▲1	▼4
Popular vote	10,185	36,671
Percentage	4.7%	16.9%
Swing	n/a	▼1.9
- Map of the results of the 2014 Havering council election. Conservatives in blue, Havering Residents Association in dark green, Labour in red, Rainham & Wennington Independent Residents Group in grey and Independents in light grey.
Council control before election before election
Conservative
Council control after election
No Overall Control

Map of Havering electoral wards.

The 2014 Havering Council election took place on 22 May 2014 to elect members of Havering Council in England. This was on the same day as other local elections. The Conservative Party ceased to have a majority of councillors, putting the council in no overall control (NOC). Despite the various residents associations winning the most seats, an agreement was not struck and a Conservative Party minority administration was formed.

== Electoral arrangements ==
Ward boundaries established in 2002 were used for the fourth time. 54 councillors were elected from 18 wards. Each ward returned three councillors.

Polling took place on 22 May 2014.

== Summary of results ==
All 5 major UK political parties, in addition to any parties gaining ~1% of the vote or above, are shown:

Havering Council Election 2014
Party	Seats	Gains	Losses	Net gain/loss	Seats %	Votes %	Votes	+/−
Conservative	22			-11	40.7	27.7	60,063	-70,780
Havering Residents Association	19			+7	35.2	26.9	58,381	-32,722
UKIP	7	7	0	+7	13.0	19.9	43,040	
Independent	5			+1	9.3	4.7	10,185	+3,293
Labour	1			-4	1.9	16.9	36,671	-28,259
Green	0	0	0	0	0	1.7	3,601	
Liberal Democrats	0	0	0	0	0	0.9	1,989	-6,997
Independent	0	0	0	0	0	0.8	1,722	

== Ward results ==
=== Brooklands ===
Brooklands (3)
Party	Candidate	Votes	%	±%
Conservative	Robert Benham	1,758	37.4	
Conservative	Vidyotama Persaud	1,620	34.5	
Conservative	Roger Westwood	1,545	32.9	
UKIP	Neil Connelly	1,469	31.3	
UKIP	Herbert Humphries	1,413	30.1	
UKIP	Frederick Osborne	1,413	30.1	
Labour	Eamonn Mahon	1,147	24.4	
Labour	Samuel Gould	1,121	23.9	
Labour	Herbert White	1,019	21.7	
Residents	Derek Smith	273	5.8	
Independent	Gaggandip Sandhu-Nelson	245	5.2	
Liberal Democrats	Karen Kruzycka	171	3.6	
Turnout		4,697	39.8	
Conservative hold		Swing		
Conservative hold		Swing		
Conservative hold		Swing		

=== Cranham ===
Cranham (3)
Party	Candidate	Votes	%	±%
Residents	June Alexander	3,243	67.0	
Residents	Gillian Ford	3,159	65.2	
Residents	Clarence Barrett	3,090	63.8	
UKIP	Mark O'Neill	1,014	20.9	
Conservative	Pamela Freer	857	17.7	
Labour	Lisa Hitchin	362	7.5	
Labour	Patrick Chalk	353	7.3	
Green	Peter Caton	343	7.1	
Labour	John Mckernan	338	7.0	
Turnout		4,843	47.5	
Residents hold		Swing		
Residents hold		Swing		
Residents hold		Swing		

=== Elm Park ===
Elm Park (3)
Party	Candidate	Votes	%	±%
Residents	Barry Mugglestone	1,691	39.2	
Residents	Stephanie Nunn	1,598	37.0	
Residents	Julie Wilkes	1,432	33.2	
UKIP	Craig Litwin	1,359	31.5	
Labour	Kim Arrowsmith	805	18.6	
Conservative	Rebbecca Bennett	781	18.1	
Labour	Graham Carr	731	16.9	
Labour	Ian James	634	14.7	
Conservative	Barry Oddy	609	14.1	
Conservative	Henry Tebbutt	494	11.4	
Ind. Residents	Graham Crouch	388	9.0	
Ind. Residents	James Green	348	8.1	
Ind. Residents	Areekul Bunprakob	344	8.0	
Green	Gerald Haines	215	5.0	
Liberal Democrats	Andrew Willmer	80	1.9	
Europeans Party	Denisse-Oana Radoi	36	0.8	
Turnout		4,319	44.1	
Residents gain from Conservative		Swing		
Residents gain from Conservative		Swing		
Residents gain from Conservative		Swing		

=== Emerson Park ===
Emerson Park (3)
Party	Candidate	Votes	%	±%
Conservative	Roger Ramsey	1,661	37.6	
Conservative	Steven Kelly	1,499	33.9	
UKIP	John Glanville	1,450	32.8	
Conservative	Paul Rochford	1,414	32.0	
Residents	Irene Eagling	1,408	31.9	
Residents	Laurance Garrard	1,364	30.9	
Residents	Christopher Wilkins	1,159	26.2	
Labour	Graham Bramley	482	10.9	
Labour	Christopher Purnell	425	9.6	
Labour	Terence Hughes	405	9.2	
Green	Carina Ancell	313	7.1	
Liberal Democrats	Graham Potter	89	2.0	
Turnout		4,416	45.7	
Conservative hold		Swing		
Conservative hold		Swing		
UKIP gain from Conservative		Swing		

=== Gooshays ===
Gooshays (3)
Party	Candidate	Votes	%	±%
UKIP	David Johnson	1,848	48.2	
UKIP	Lawrence Webb	1,790	46.7	
UKIP	Patricia Rumble	1,733	45.2	
Labour	Patrick Murray	1,007	26.3	
Labour	Christine McGeary	942	24.6	
Labour	Jeffrey Stafford	803	21.0	
Conservative	Marcus Llewellyn-Rothschild	621	16.2	
Conservative	Keith Wells	614	16.0	
Conservative	Keith Evans	608	15.9	
Residents	Adam Elliott	280	7.3	
Residents	Lucia Wise	257	6.7	
BNP	Raymond Underwood	247	6.4	
Liberal Democrats	John Porter	106	2.8	
Turnout		3,832	36.4	
UKIP gain from Labour		Swing		
UKIP hold		Swing		
UKIP gain from Conservative		Swing		

=== Hacton ===
Hacton (3)
Party	Candidate	Votes	%	±%
Residents	Raymond Morgon	2,708	58.0	
Residents	Louis Dodin	2,590	55.5	
Residents	Barbara Matthews	2,576	55.2	
UKIP	Jeffrey Garnett	1,288	27.6	
Conservative	Ruth Edes	679	14.5	
Conservative	Carol Perry	616	13.2	
Conservative	Terence Mustoo	535	11.5	
Labour	Natasha Moreno-Roberts	424	9.1	
Labour	Sinead Earley	413	8.8	
Labour	Susan Jiggens	374	8.0	
Green	David Beesley	271	5.8	
Liberal Democrats	Susan Brewington	102	2.2	
Turnout		4,668	46.6	
Residents hold		Swing		
Residents hold		Swing		
Residents hold		Swing		

=== Harold Wood ===
Harold Wood (3)
Party	Candidate	Votes	%	±%
Residents	Brian Eagling	2,736	59.4	
Residents	Darren Wise	2,294	49.8	
Residents	Alex Donald	2,221	48.2	
UKIP	John Thurtle	1,140	24.7	
Conservative	Lesley Kelly	854	18.5	
Conservative	Pamela Light	723	15.7	
Conservative	Robert Perry	661	14.3	
Labour	Siobhan McGeary	436	9.5	
Labour	Michael Hitchin	415	9.0	
Labour	Bakary Singhateh	346	7.5	
Liberal Democrats	Jonathan Coles	202	4.4	
Liberal Democrats	Ian Sanderson	118	2.6	
Liberal Democrats	David Williams	82	1.8	
TUSC	Chris Rice	62	1.3	
Turnout		4,607	45.7	
Residents hold		Swing		
Residents gain from Conservative		Swing		
Residents gain from Conservative		Swing		

=== Havering Park ===
Havering Park (3)
Party	Candidate	Votes	%	±%
Conservative	Margaret Davis	1,787	42.8	
Conservative	Raymond Best	1,699	40.7	
Conservative	John Crowder	1,635	39.2	
UKIP	Sandra Binion	1,527	36.6	
UKIP	Andrew Wilson	1,493	35.8	
UKIP	Edward Martin	1,421	34.0	
Labour	Emma Adams	656	15.7	
Labour	David Dawson	577	13.8	
Labour	Peter McInerney	533	12.8	
Green	Joanna Steranka	149	3.6	
Liberal Democrats	Peter Spence	90	2.2	
Turnout		4,175	42.0	
Conservative hold		Swing		
Conservative hold		Swing		
Conservative hold		Swing		

=== Heaton ===
Heaton (3)
Party	Candidate	Votes	%	±%
UKIP	Philip Hyde	1,549	43.4	
UKIP	Ian de Wulverton	1,506	42.2	
Labour	Keith Darvill	1,206	33.8	
Labour	Denis O'Flynn	1,165	32.7	
Labour	Paul McGeary	1,135	31.8	
Conservative	Robert Binion	761	21.3	
Conservative	Wesley Smith	636	17.8	
Conservative	Matthew Sutton	606	17.0	
BNP	Kevin Layzell	556	15.6	
Turnout		3,567	37.2	
UKIP gain from Labour		Swing		
UKIP gain from Labour		Swing		
Labour hold		Swing		

=== Hylands ===
Hylands (3)
Party	Candidate	Votes	%	±%
Conservative	Garry Pain	1,596	34.4	
Residents	Jody Ganly	1,553	33.4	
Conservative	Carol Smith	1,542	33.2	
Conservative	Christine Smith	1,449	31.2	
Residents	Jeremy Wilkes	1,356	29.2	
UKIP	Neil Hall	1,346	29.0	
Residents	Lorraine Moss	1,287	27.7	
UKIP	Peter Gardner	1,263	27.2	
Labour	Amanda McInerney	440	9.5	
Labour	Penelope White	422	9.1	
Labour	William Murphy	410	8.8	
Green	David Voak	285	6.1	
Liberal Democrats	James Snell	68	1.5	
Turnout		4,646	44.1	
Conservative hold		Swing		
Residents gain from Conservative		Swing		
Conservative hold		Swing		

=== Mawneys ===
Mawneys (3)
Party	Candidate	Votes	%	±%
Conservative	Jason Frost	2,028	47.0	
Conservative	Linda Trew	1,952	45.3	
Conservative	Dilip Patel	1,771	41.1	
UKIP	Ralph Battershall	1,753	40.7	
Labour	Robert Ritchie	827	19.2	
Labour	Daniel Nichols	799	18.5	
Labour	Michael Agunbiade	703	16.3	
Liberal Democrats	Stewart Mott	190	4.4	
Turnout		4,312	43.7	
Conservative hold		Swing		
Conservative hold		Swing		
Conservative hold		Swing		

=== Pettits ===
Pettits (3)
Party	Candidate	Votes	%	±%
Conservative	Philippa Crowder	2,102	40.1	
Conservative	Osman Dervish	1,887	36.0	
Conservative	Robby Misir	1,827	34.9	
UKIP	Edward Eden	1,498	28.6	
UKIP	Katrina Birch	1,488	28.4	
UKIP	Henry Tebbutt	1,367	26.1	
Residents	Ian Wilkes	1,185	22.6	
Residents	Denis Stevens	1,157	22.1	
Residents	Philip Wailing	1,091	20.8	
Labour	Matthew Reid	942	18.0	
Labour	John McCole	939	17.9	
Labour	Umar Kankima	874	16.7	
Liberal Democrats	Michael McCarthy	105	2.0	
Turnout		5,239	49.5	
Conservative hold		Swing		
Conservative hold		Swing		
Conservative hold		Swing		

=== Rainham and Wennington ===
Rainham and Wennington (3)
Party	Candidate	Votes	%	±%
Ind. Residents	Jeffrey Tucker	1,982	52.9	
Ind. Residents	David Durant	1,395	37.2	
Ind. Residents	Keith Roberts	1,390	37.1	
UKIP	Michael Smith	1,284	34.2	
Labour	Anthony Ellis	973	26.0	
Labour	Alan Vickers	752	20.1	
Labour	Martin Earley	698	18.6	
Conservative	Ruth Camilleri	350	9.3	
Conservative	Bernadette Oddy	300	8.0	
Conservative	Stuart Farquhar	263	7.0	
Green	Maria Paterlini-Phillips	206	5.5	
Liberal Democrats	Pamela Coles	74	2.0	
Turnout		3,749	38.7	
Ind. Residents hold		Swing		
Ind. Residents hold		Swing		
Ind. Residents hold		Swing		

=== Romford Town ===
Romford Town (3)
Party	Candidate	Votes	%	±%
Conservative	Wendy Brice-Thompson	2,067	41.3	
Conservative	Joshua Chapman	1,946	38.9	
Conservative	Frederick Thompson	1,680	33.5	
Independent	Andrew Curtin	1,477	29.5	
UKIP	Bradley Whitby	1,467	29.3	
Labour	Neil Brindley	1,118	22.3	
Labour	Michael Yore	945	18.9	
Labour	Stephen Jaques	926	18.5	
Green	Amanda Haines	639	12.8	
Liberal Democrats	John Deeks	255	5.1	
Turnout		5,009	40.5	
Conservative hold		Swing		
Conservative hold		Swing		
Conservative hold		Swing		

=== St Andrew's ===
St Andrew's (3)
Party	Candidate	Votes	%	±%
Residents	John Wood	1,906	40.9	
Residents	John Mylod	1,894	40.7	
Residents	Reginald Whitney	1,572	33.7	
UKIP	Julian Clark	1,570	33.7	
Conservative	Malcolm Brace	976	21.0	
Conservative	Georgina Galpin	927	19.9	
Conservative	Edward Sepple	867	18.6	
Labour	Georgina Carr	575	12.3	
Labour	Barbara Bramley	568	10.0	
Labour	Keith Taffs	462	9.9	
Green	Danuta Gorzynska-Hart	312	6.7	
Liberal Democrats	Geoffrey Coles	81	1.7	
National Liberal	Graham Davidson	50	1.1	
National Liberal	Graham Littlechild	43	0.9	
National Liberal	Madelaine Marsden	32	0.7	
Turnout		4,658	42.9	
Residents gain from Conservative		Swing		
Residents hold		Swing		
Residents hold		Swing		

=== South Hornchurch ===
South Hornchurch (3)
Party	Candidate	Votes	%	±%
Ind. Residents	Michael-Deon Burton	1,738	44.4	
UKIP	Philip Martin	1,500	38.3	
Ind. Residents	Graham Williamson	1,336	34.1	
Ind. Residents	Mark Logan	1,264	32.3	
Labour	Patricia Brown	870	22.2	
Labour	Pervez Badruddin	867	22.1	
Labour	Christopher Freeman	710	18.1	
Conservative	Patricia Clark	567	14.5	
Conservative	Warren Camilleri	468	11.9	
Conservative	Tammey Oddy	296	7.6	
Green	Kuan Phillips	275	7.0	
Turnout		3,917	37.6	
Ind. Residents hold		Swing		
UKIP gain from Conservative		Swing		
Ind. Residents gain from Labour		Swing		

=== Squirrels Heath ===
Squirrels Heath (3)
Party	Candidate	Votes	%	±%
Conservative	Melvin Wallace	2,147	46.0	
Conservative	Damian White	2,057	44.1	
Conservative	Michael White	2,015	43.2	
UKIP	Eric Munday	1,299	27.8	
UKIP	Lynden Thorpe	1,291	27.7	
UKIP	Jacqueline Walsh	1,289	27.6	
Labour	Florence Brindley	603	12.9	
Labour	Joseph Macveigh	564	12.1	
Labour	Patrick Quinn	545	11.7	
Residents	Raymond Coomer	431	9.2	
Residents	Isabelle Alexander	401	8.6	
Residents	David Godwin	311	6.7	
Green	Michael Hughes	255	5.5	
Liberal Democrats	Madge Mulliner	103	2.2	
Turnout		4,669	44.6	
Conservative hold		Swing		
Conservative hold		Swing		
Conservative hold		Swing		

=== Upminster ===
Upminster (3)
Party	Candidate	Votes	%	±%
Residents	Linda Hawthorn	3,507	67.7	
Residents	Ron Ower	3,447	66.6	
Residents	Linda Van den Hende	3,204	61.9	
UKIP	Malvin Brown	1,212	23.4	
Conservative	Donna Gibson	673	13.0	
Conservative	Danny Weedon	572	11.0	
Conservative	Poh Foong	465	9.0	
Labour	Julia Darvill	364	7.0	
Green	Melanie Collins	338	6.5	
Labour	Kate Darvill	298	5.8	
Labour	Rosetta Reehill	223	4.3	
Liberal Democrats	Bruce Carter	98	1.9	
Turnout		5,178	49.3	
Residents hold		Swing		
Residents hold		Swing		
Residents hold		Swing		

== By-elections ==
The following by-election took place between the 2014 and 2018 elections:

- 2016 Heaton (Havering) by-election (Labour gain from UKIP)
