= 2006 Havering London Borough Council election =

2006 local election in England

- 4 May 2006

All 54 Havering London Borough Council seats 28 seats needed for a majority
	First party	Second party	Third party
Party	Conservative	Residents	Labour
Seats won	34	16	2
Seat change	▲8	▼2	▼7
Popular vote	26,940	22,372	11,269
Percentage	36.7%	30.6%	15.4%
Swing	▼0.5%	▲5.2%	▼9.7%
	Fourth party	Fifth party
Party	Liberal Democrats	BNP
Seats won	1	1
Seat change	Steady	▲1
Popular vote	1,761	1,591
Percentage	2.4%	2.2%
Swing	▼3.7%	New
- Map of the results of the 2006 Havering council election. BNP in dark blue, Conservatives in blue, Havering Residents Association in dark green, Labour in red, Liberal Democrats in yellow, Rainham & Wennington Independent Residents Group in grey.
Council control before election
No overall control
Council control after election
Conservative

Elections for Havering London Borough Council were held on 4 May 2006.

In London council elections, the entire council is elected every four years, as opposed to some local elections where one councillor is elected every year for three of the four years. In this election, the Conservatives took control of the council after gaining 8 seats.

== Electoral arrangements ==
New ward boundaries established in 2002 were used for the second time. 54 councillors were elected from 18 wards. Each ward returned three councillors.

Polling took place on 4 May 2006.

== Results ==
Havering Council election result 2006
Party	Seats	Gains	Losses	Net gain/loss	Seats %	Votes %	Votes	+/−
Conservative	34	10	2	▲8	63.0	36.7	26,940	▼0.5
Residents	16	1	3	▼2	24.1	30.6	22,372	▲5.2
Labour	2	1	8	▼7	3.7	15.4	11,269	▼9.7
Liberal Democrats	1	1	1	Steady	1.9	2.4	1,761	▼3.7
BNP	1	1	0	▲1	1.9	2.2	1,591	New
UKIP	0	0	0	Steady	0.0	4.0	2,954	▲3.7
Independent	0	0	0	Steady	0.0	3.3	2,456	▲2.6
National Liberal	0	0	0	Steady	0.0	2.9	2,153	▲0.7
Green	0	0	0	Steady	0.0	2.5	1,837	▲1.8

== Ward results ==
=== Brooklands ===
Brooklands (3)
Party	Candidate	Votes	%	±%
Conservative	Robert Benham	1,813	45.8	
Conservative	Frederick Osborne	1,745		
Conservative	Barry Tebbutt	1,708		
Liberal Democrats	Karen Kruzycka	762	19.3	
Liberal Democrats	Paul Kruzycki	721		
Liberal Democrats	Keith Taffs	666		
Labour	Jaqueline Fingleson	602	15.2	
Labour	Ian James	574		
Labour	Stephen Jaques	534		
Residents	Eamonn Mahon	477	12.1	
Residents	Robert Taylor	415		
Residents	Ronald Couzens	407		
Green	James Caspell	301	7.6	
Turnout			37.9	
Conservative gain from Liberal Democrats		Swing		
Conservative hold		Swing		
Conservative hold		Swing		

=== Cranham ===
Cranham (3)
Party	Candidate	Votes	%	±%
Residents	June Alexander	3,109	63.9	
Residents	Gillian Ford	3,023		
Residents	Clarence Barrett	3,014		
Conservative	Catherine Bull	1,012	20.8	
Conservative	Terence Monk	913		
Conservative	Marc Hand	838		
Labour	Margaret Lindsay	378	7.8	
Labour	Patrick Chalk	375		
Labour	John McKernan	356		
Green	David Voak	269	5.5	
National Liberal	Graham Littlechild	99	2.0	
National Liberal	Joan Morrison	86		
National Liberal	Edgar Smith	75		
Turnout			48.1	
Residents hold		Swing		
Residents hold		Swing		
Residents hold		Swing		

=== Elm Park ===
Elm Park (3)
Party	Candidate	Votes	%	±%
Conservative	David Grantham	1,448	37.8	
Conservative	Jeremy Evans	1,421		
Conservative	Barry Oddy	1,420		
National Liberal	Joyce Pammen	989	25.8	
Labour	Graham Carr	957	25.0	
National Liberal	Graham Williamson	954		
Labour	Ray Harris	946		
Labour	Janet Davis	938		
National Liberal	Keith Roberts	857		
Green	Gerald Haines	440	11.5	
Turnout			39.9	
Conservative gain from Labour		Swing		
Conservative gain from Labour		Swing		
Conservative gain from Labour		Swing		

=== Emerson Park ===
Emerson Park (3)
Party	Candidate	Votes	%	±%
Conservative	Roger Ramsey	2,495	61.8	
Conservative	Steven Kelly	2,373		
Conservative	Paul Rochford	2,291		
Residents	Jacqueline Long	679	16.8	
Residents	John Corrigan	675		
Residents	Giovanni Anastasi	597		
Labour	Terence Hughes	470		
Labour	Frances Chalk	470	11.6	
Labour	Sean Willis	425		
UKIP	Sunita Seenath	214	5.3	
Independent	Julia Fraser	179	4.4	
Independent	Robert Samson	151		
Independent	Gregory Segal	100		
Turnout			41.8	
Conservative hold		Swing		
Conservative hold		Swing		
Conservative hold		Swing		

=== Gooshays ===
Gooshays (3)
Party	Candidate	Votes	%	±%
BNP	Alan Bailey	996	28.2	
Conservative	Dennis Bull	952	27.0	
Conservative	Keith Wells	916		
Labour	Yvonne Cornell	915	25.9	
Labour	Brian Eagling	912		
Conservative	Marjorie Ramsey	885		
Labour	Jeffery Stafford	814		
UKIP	Florence Leverett	379	10.7	
UKIP	Bryan Woolerton	321		
Residents	Jonathon Holt	199	5.6	
Residents	Jacqueline Williams	162		
Residents	John Parker	157		
Independent	Guy Stevens	88	2.5	
Independent	Wendy Stevens	84		
Independent	Haydn Kent	78		
Turnout			31.0	
BNP gain from Labour		Swing		
Conservative gain from Labour		Swing		
Conservative gain from Labour		Swing		

=== Hacton ===
Hacton (3)
Party	Candidate	Votes	%	±%
Residents	Ray Morgon	2,341	52.3	
Residents	Barbara Reith	2,322		
Residents	Stephen Whittaker	2,035		
Conservative	Ruth Edes	1,181	26.4	
Labour	Julia Darvill	524	11.7	
Labour	Susan Jiggens	523		
Labour	Allen Roach	500		
National Liberal	Gary Roberts	272	6.1	
National Liberal	Nakkeeran Arasaratnam	190		
Independent	Pramjit Singh Sadra	162	3.6	
Turnout			40.1	
Residents hold		Swing		
Residents hold		Swing		
Residents hold		Swing		

=== Harold Wood ===
Harold Wood (3)
Party	Candidate	Votes	%	±%
Conservative	Lesley Kelly	1,047	24.7	
Conservative	Pamela Light	1,036		
Liberal Democrats	Jonathan Coles	999	23.6	
Liberal Democrats	Pamela Coles	969		
Residents	Patrick Curtis	968	22.8	
Conservative	Garry Pain	936		
Residents	Ronald Ower	929		
Residents	Richard Harrington	821		
Liberal Democrats	Ian Sanderson	804		
Labour	Bunny Eagling	646	15.2	
Labour	Michael Hitchin	564		
Labour	Darren Wise	525		
National Liberal	David Durant	353	8.3	
National Liberal	Geoffrey Taylor	339		
National Liberal	Nicholas Causton	315		
Green	Maryla Hart	227	5.4	
Turnout			40.7	
Conservative hold		Swing		
Conservative hold		Swing		
Liberal Democrats gain from Conservative		Swing		

=== Havering Park ===
Havering Park (3)
Party	Candidate	Votes	%	±%
Conservative	Sandra Binion	1,617	44.3	
Conservative	Geoffrey Starns	1,606		
Residents	Andy Mann	1,400	38.3	
Conservative	Alby Tebbutt	1,365		
Residents	Kevin Tonks	1,230		
Residents	Jean Gower	1,224		
Labour	Peter McInerney	415	11.4	
Labour	Peter White	404		
Labour	Pervez Badruddin	383		
UKIP	Charles Hawksbee	221	6.0	
UKIP	Harry Parkinson	179		
UKIP	Jennie Parkinson	168		
Turnout			39.0	
Conservative hold		Swing		
Conservative hold		Swing		
Residents gain from Conservative		Swing		

=== Heaton ===
Heaton (3)
Party	Candidate	Votes	%	±%
Conservative	Christine Fox	930	29.7	
Labour	Keith Darvill	902	28.8	
Conservative	Gary Adams	899		
Labour	Ken Clark	884		
Labour	Caroline Wood	811		
Conservative	Gary Murphy	794		
BNP	Anthony Easton	595	19.0	
UKIP	Colin Rout	568	18.1	
UKIP	Lawrence Webb	431		
UKIP	Ian de Wulverton	401		
Independent	Terence Burland	139	4.4	
Independent	Damian Wakeman	122		
Turnout			32.3	
Conservative gain from Labour		Swing		
Labour hold		Swing		
Conservative gain from Labour		Swing		

=== Hylands ===
Hylands (3)
Party	Candidate	Votes	%	±%
Conservative	Georgina Galpin	1,430	37.1	
Conservative	Mark Gadd	1,356		
Conservative	Malcolm Brace	1,325		
Residents	Susan Belcher	998	25.9	
Residents	Jeremy Wilkes	942		
Residents	Valerie Morris	897		
Labour	Raymond Shaw	670	17.4	
Labour	Michael Wood	637		
Labour	Patricia Wood	615		
UKIP	Kenneth Hayes	549	14.2	
UKIP	Terry Murray	538		
UKIP	Alan Scott	505		
National Liberal	Philip Davey	140	3.6	
National Liberal	Patricia Frater	111		
Independent	Paul Randell	72	1.9	
Turnout			39.3	
Conservative hold		Swing		
Conservative hold		Swing		
Conservative hold		Swing		

=== Mawneys ===
Mawneys (3)
Party	Candidate	Votes	%	±%
Conservative	Peter Gardner	1,723	43.0	
Conservative	Melvin Wallace	1,690		
Conservative	Robby Misir	1,570		
Residents	Alexandra Smith	1,378	34.4	
Residents	Derek Price	1,350		
Residents	Martin Smith	1,269		
Labour	Paul McGeary	518	12.9	
Labour	Patience Eagles	512		
Labour	Herbert White	490		
UKIP	Ian Joyce	285	7.1	
Independent	William Spink	105	2.6	
Turnout			40.6	
Conservative hold		Swing		
Conservative hold		Swing		
Conservative hold		Swing		

=== Pettits ===
Pettits (3)
Party	Candidate	Votes	%	±%
Conservative	Michael Armstrong	2,636	54.7	
Conservative	Edward Eden	2,567		
Conservative	Kevin Gregory	2,485		
Residents	Ian Wilkes	1,385	28.7	
Residents	Denis Stevens	1,379		
Residents	Duncan Macpherson	1,282		
Labour	James Forsyth	410	8.5	
Labour	Ben Kilpatrick	370		
Labour	John McCole	368		
UKIP	James Fellowes	207	4.3	
Independent	June Watson	180	3.7	
UKIP	Yogendra Sharma	152		
Turnout			45.8	
Conservative hold		Swing		
Conservative hold		Swing		
Conservative hold		Swing		

=== Rainham and Wennington ===
Rainham and Wennington (3)
Party	Candidate	Votes	%	±%
Ind. Residents	Jeffrey Tucker	2,211	59.2	
Ind. Residents	Coral Jeffery	1,900		
Ind. Residents	Mark Stewart	1,685		
Labour	Tony Ellis	870	23.3	
Conservative	George Daniels	651	17.4	
Labour	Kathleen Vann	587		
Labour	Denis O'Flynn	545		
Turnout			36.9	
Ind. Residents hold		Swing		
Ind. Residents gain from Labour		Swing		
Ind. Residents gain from Labour		Swing		

The following by-elections took place in the ward between the 2002 and 2006 elections:

- 2003 (Labour gain from Ind. Residents)
- 2004 (Labour gain from Ind. Residents)

=== Romford Town ===
Romford Town (3)
Party	Candidate	Votes	%	±%
Conservative	Andrew Curtin	1,925	52.6	
Conservative	Wendy Brice-Thompson	1,902		
Conservative	Frederick Thompson	1,781		
Residents	Edward McKiernan	812	22.2	
Residents	Pamela Wilkes	769		
Residents	Julie Porter	764		
Labour	Neil Brindley	724	19.8	
Labour	Susan Shaw	686		
Labour	Penelope White	653		
Independent	Madelaine Marsden	197	5.4	
Independent	Michael Davis	195		
Independent	Daniel Mannix	163		
Turnout			35.0	
Conservative hold		Swing		
Conservative hold		Swing		
Conservative hold		Swing		

=== St Andrew's ===
St Andrew's (3)
Party	Candidate	Votes	%	±%
Residents	John Mylod	1,585		
Conservative	David Charles	1,535		
Residents	Brenda Riddle	1,527		
Conservative	Christopher Ryan	1,462		
Conservative	Gloria Passannante	1,388		
Residents	Michael Winter	1,379		
Labour	Georgina Carr	703		
Labour	Michael Davis	616		
Labour	Bryan Vincent	613		
Independent	Mark Logan	324		
Independent	Kevin Jones	304		
National Liberal	John Coles	300		
Turnout				
Residents hold		Swing		
Conservative gain from Residents		Swing		
Residents hold		Swing		

=== South Hornchurch ===
South Hornchurch (3)
Party	Candidate	Votes	%	±%
Residents	Leonard Long	878	24.5	
Labour	Thomas Binding	821	22.9	
Conservative	John Clark	812	22.6	
Residents	Reginald Whitney	788		
Residents	Wendy Clark	757		
Conservative	Patricia Clark	742		
Labour	David Leigh	741		
Labour	Rosina Purnell	733		
Independent	Wendy Buck	687	19.1	
Independent	Michael-Deon Burton	656		
Independent	June Walker	623		
Conservative	Ronald Gadd	620		
Green	Susan Gower	204	5.7	
Green	Guy Gower	191		
Residents	Malvin Brown	186	5.2	
Turnout			34.0	
Residents hold		Swing		
Labour gain from Residents		Swing		
Conservative gain from Residents		Swing		

=== Squirrel's Heath ===
Squirrel's Heath (3)
Party	Candidate	Votes	%	±%
Conservative	Edward Cahill	2,614	64.5	
Conservative	Eric Munday	2,487		
Conservative	Michael White	2,423		
Residents	John Shrimpton	512	12.6	
Residents	Colin Maston	486		
Residents	Timothy Williams	474		
Labour	Eric Lovett	440	10.9	
Labour	Vineet Gupta	414		
Labour	Harry Webb	401		
UKIP	Robert Gracie	270	6.7	
Independent	Gregory Campbell	215	5.3	
Independent	Ann Kent	157		
Independent	Susan Francis	130		
Turnout			39.1	
Conservative hold		Swing		
Conservative hold		Swing		
Conservative hold		Swing		

=== Upminster ===
Upminster (3)
Party	Candidate	Votes	%	±%
Residents	Linda Hawthorn	3,254	59.8	
Residents	Muriel Mylod	3,137		
Residents	Linda Van den Hende	2,897		
Conservative	Claire Palmer	1,119	20.6	
Conservative	Richard Pyke	1,019		
Conservative	Matthew Walsh	947		
Green	Melanie Collins	396	7.3	
Labour	David Scott	304	5.6	
Labour	Matthew Carr	301		
UKIP	Ted Barrett	261	4.8	
Labour	Diane Willis	232		
Independent	Ron Hodgson	108	2.0	
Independent	Alfredo Dias	72		
Turnout			48.6	
Residents hold		Swing		
Residents hold		Swing		
Residents hold		Swing		

== By-elections ==
The following by-elections took place between the 2006 and 2010 elections:

- 2007 St Andrew's (Havering) by-election
- 2007 Squirrel's Heath by-election
- 2008 Gooshays by-election
- 2008 South Hornchurch by-election (Independent gain from Residents)
- 2009 St Andrew's (Havering) by-election (Residents gain from Conservative)
