= Maney (surname) =

Maney is a surname. Notable people with the surname include:

- C. Joseph Maney (died 1954), American businessman, part-owner of the Boston Braves baseball team
- George Earl Maney (1826–1901), American soldier, politician and diplomat
- Glen Maney (born 1964), British comedian
- James W. Maney (1862–1945), American engineer
- Mabel Maney, American artist and author
- Patt Maney (born 1948), American military officer, judge, and politician
- Vincent Maney (1886–1952), American baseball shortstop
