= 2018 Havering London Borough Council election =

- 3 May 2018

All 54 Havering London Borough Council seats 27 seats needed for a majority

	First party	Second party	Third party
Party	Conservative	Havering Residents Association	Labour
Last election	22 seats, 27.7%	19 seats, 26.9%	1 seat, 16.9%
Seats won	25	17	5
Seat change	▲3	▼2	▲4
Popular vote	75,088	57,445	41,586
Percentage	37.1%	28.4%	20.6%
Swing	▲9.4%	▲1.5%	▲3.7%
	Fourth party	Fifth party	Sixth party
Party	Ind. Residents	Harold Hill Ind.	UKIP
Last election	5 seats, 4.7%	Did not stand	7 seats, 19.9%
Seats won	5	1	0
Seat change	Steady	▲1	▼7
Popular vote	6,838	4,226	6,399
Percentage	3.4%	2.1%	3.2%
Swing	▼1.3%	n/a	▼16.7%
- Map of the results of the 2018 Havering council election. Conservatives in blue, Havering Residents Association in dark green, Labour in red, Rainham & Wennington Independent Residents Group in grey and Independents in light grey.
Council control before election
No Overall Control
Council control after election
No Overall Control

Map of Havering electoral wards.

The 2018 Havering London Borough Council election was held on 3 May 2018 to elect members of Havering London Borough Council in Greater London. Elections were held for all 54 seats on the council. This was on the same day as other local elections.

== Electoral arrangements ==
Ward boundaries established in 2002 were used for the fifth and final time, with new ward boundaries in use from the next election in 2022. 54 councillors were elected from 18 wards. Each ward returned three councillors.

Polling took place on 3 May 2018.

== Results ==
The Conservative Party gained three seats, increasing its number of councillors to 25. It consolidated its position as the largest group on the council, but did not gain overall control.

Havering Residents Association lost two seats, reducing its number of councillors to 17. However, it remained the second largest party on the council. Of its 17 councillors, eight represent Hornchurch Residents' Association, six Upminster and Cranham Residents' Association and three Harold Wood Hill Park Residents Association.

The Labour Party gained four seats, increasing its number of councillors to five. It is now the third largest party on the council.

Rainham and Wennington Independent Residents Association held three seats and South Hornchurch Independent Residents Association held two. Together, they formed the Independent Residents' Group. The Harold Hill Independent Party won one seat.

One independent candidate, Michael Deon-Burton, won a seat in South Hornchurch ward. However, shortly after being elected he joined the Conservative Party and was elected Deputy Mayor. Voters, councillors and defeated candidates protested the decision, and alleged that some other councillors who had been elected as Residents' Association candidates were now supporting the Conservative group.

The UK Independence Party lost all seven of its seats on the council.

Havering Council election result 2018
Party	Seats	Gains	Losses	Net gain/loss	Seats %	Votes %	Votes	+/−
Conservative	25			+3	46.3	37.1	75,088	+9.4
Havering Residents Association	17			-2	31.5	28.4	57,445	+1.5
Labour	5			+4	9.3	20.6	41,586	+3.7
Ind. Residents	5			±0	9.3	3.4	6,838	-1.3
UKIP	0			-7		3.2	6,399	-16.7
Harold Hill Ind.	1			+1	1.9	2.1	4,226	n/a
Green	0			0		1.9	3,840	+0.2
Independent	1			+1	1.9	1.8	3,588	+1.0
Liberal Democrats	0			±0		1.5	3,128	+0.6
BNP	0			±0		0.1	123	n/a
National Front	0			0		0.0	50	n/a

== Ward results ==
=== Brooklands ===
Brooklands (3)
Party	Candidate	Votes	%	±%
Conservative	Robert Benham	2,342	55.6	+18.2
Conservative	Timothy Ryan	2,146	51.0	+18.1
Conservative	Viddy Persaud	2,138	50.8	+16.3
Labour	Angelina Leatherbarrow	1,592	37.8	+13.4
Labour	Robert Ritchie	1,377	32.7	+8.8
Labour	Taimaz Ranjbaran	1,335	31.7	+10.0
Green	Josephine Longhurst	344	8.2	N/A
UKIP	Stephen Kimber	290	6.9	−24.4
Liberal Democrats	Peter Davies	240	5.7	+2.1
Turnout			32.51	
Majority		554		
Conservative hold		Swing		
Conservative hold		Swing		
Conservative hold		Swing		

=== Cranham ===
Cranham (3)
Party	Candidate	Votes	%	±%
Residents	Gillian Ford	2,932	68.0	+2.8
Residents	Clarence Barrett	2,817	65.3	+1.5
Residents	John Tyler	2,502	58.0	−9.0
Conservative	Paul Connew	974	22.6	+4.9
Conservative	Henry Frost	769	17.8	N/A
Conservative	Poh Foong	593	13.8	N/A
Labour	Kate Darvill	475	11.0	+3.5
Labour	John McKernan	415	9.6	+2.6
Green	Peter Caton	325	7.5	+0.4
Labour	John Millard	287	6.7	−0.6
UKIP	Helen Johnson	274	6.4	−14.5
Turnout			43.09	
Majority		1,528		
Residents hold		Swing		
Residents hold		Swing		
Residents hold		Swing		

=== Elm Park ===
Elm Park (3)
Party	Candidate	Votes	%	±%
Residents	Barry Mugglestone	2,160	57.6	+18.4
Residents	Stephanie Nunn	2,079	55.4	+18.4
Residents	Sally Miller	2,012	53.6	+20.4
Labour	Simon Darvill	776	20.7	+2.1
Conservative	Alfie Cooper	756	20.1	+2.0
Labour	Carol Palmer	732	19.5	+2.6
Conservative	Barry Oddy	648	17.3	+3.2
Labour	Umair Saeed	604	16.1	+1.4
Conservative	Rebecca Oddy	549	14.6	+3.2
UKIP	Philip Martin	281	7.5	−24.0
Green	Gerald Haines	149	4.0	−1.0
Liberal Democrats	Shane Foster	78	2.1	+0.2
Turnout			37.52	
Majority		1,236		
Residents hold		Swing		
Residents hold		Swing		
Residents hold		Swing		

=== Emerson Park ===
Emerson Park (3)
Party	Candidate	Votes	%	±%
Conservative	Roger Ramsey	1,857	46.1	+8.5
Conservative	Robert Perry	1,790	44.4	+10.5
Conservative	Matthew Sutton	1,495	37.1	+5.1
Residents	Laurance Garrard	1,491	37.0	+6.1
Residents	David Godwin	1,434	35.6	+3.7
Residents	John Stone	1,393	34.6	+8.4
Labour	Anil Gupta	570	14.1	+3.2
Labour	Susan Bearman	553	13.7	+4.1
Labour	Edwyn Mayhew	448	11.1	+1.9
UKIP	David Johnson	269	6.7	−26.1
Green	Ian Pirie	187	4.6	−2.5
Liberal Democrats	Graham Potter	89	2.2	+0.2
Turnout			41.18	
Majority		4		
Conservative hold		Swing		
Conservative hold		Swing		
Conservative gain from UKIP		Swing		

=== Gooshays ===
Gooshays (3)
Party	Candidate	Votes	%	±%
Labour	Carole Beth	1,100	33.1	+6.8
Labour	Paul McGeary	973	29.3	+4.7
Harold Hill Ind.	Jan Sargent	956	28.8	N/A
Harold Hill Ind.	Sam Brown	915	27.5	N/A
Labour	Adam Curtis	910	27.4	+6.4
Harold Hill Ind.	Lorraine Moss	839	25.2	N/A
Conservative	Gregory Samuel	693	20.8	+4.6
Conservative	Joseph Webster	619	18.6	+2.6
Conservative	Dominic Swan	593	17.8	+1.9
UKIP	Ben Buckland	479	14.4	−33.8
UKIP	Lawrence Webb	383	11.5	−35.7
UKIP	Patricia Rumble	382	11.5	−33.7
Residents	Isabelle Alexander	197	5.9	−1.4
Green	Katie Morant	173	5.2	N/A
Residents	Lucia Wise	160	4.8	−1.9
Residents	Irene Eagling	147	4.4	N/A
Liberal Democrats	John Porter	99	3.0	+0.2
National Front	Kevin Layzell	50	1.5	N/A
Turnout			40.93	
Majority		41		
Labour gain from UKIP		Swing		
Labour gain from UKIP		Swing		
Harold Hill Ind. gain from UKIP		Swing		

=== Hacton ===
Hacton (3)
Party	Candidate	Votes	%	±%
Residents	Raymond Morgon	2,653	65.2	+17.2
Residents	Louis Dodin	2,483	61.0	+5.5
Residents	Reginald Whitney	2,286	56.1	+0.9
Conservative	Carol Perry	807	19.8	+6.6
Conservative	Patricia Clark	781	19.2	+4.7
Conservative	Mazim Nwafor	630	15.5	+4.0
Labour	Michael Davis	567	13.9	+4.8
Labour	Sinead Earley	533	13.1	+4.3
Labour	Susan Jiggens	522	12.8	+4.8
UKIP	Jeffrey Long	289	7.1	−20.5
Green	David Beesley	200	4.9	−0.9
Liberal Democrats	Andrew Willmer	102	2.5	+0.3
Turnout			40.93	
Majority		1,479		
Residents hold		Swing		
Residents hold		Swing		
Residents hold		Swing		

=== Harold Wood ===
Harold Wood (3)
Party	Candidate	Votes	%	±%
Residents	Brian Eagling	2,804	68.7	+9.3
Residents	Martin Goode	2,664	65.3	+17.1
Residents	Darren Wise	2,566	62.9	+13.1
Labour	Christine McGeary	651	16.0	+6.5
Labour	Patrick Murray	607	14.9	+5.9
Conservative	Michail Koufalitakis	539	13.2	−5.3
Conservative	Frederick Thompson	530	13.0	−2.7
Labour	Desmond Withrington	522	12.8	+5.3
Conservative	Ashok Kumar	448	11.0	−3.3
UKIP	Paul Thurtle	252	6.2	−18.5
Liberal Democrats	Jonathan Coles	182	4.5	+0.1
Turnout			36.93	
Majority		1,915		
Residents hold		Swing		
Residents hold		Swing		
Residents hold		Swing		

=== Havering Park ===
Havering Park (3)
Party	Candidate	Votes	%	±%
Conservative	Raymond Best	2,088	64.1	+23.4
Conservative	John Crowder	2,001	61.4	+22.2
Conservative	Christine Vickery	1,865	57.2	+14.4
Labour	David Dawson	802	24.6	+10.8
Labour	Carol Singh	687	21.1	+5.4
Labour	Birendra Singh	678	20.8	+8.0
UKIP	David Rumble	370	11.4	−25.2
Green	Andrew Longhurst	356	10.9	+7.3
Liberal Democrats	Peter Hobday	190	5.8	+3.6
Turnout			32.1	
Majority		1,063		
Conservative hold		Swing		
Conservative hold		Swing		
Conservative hold		Swing		

=== Heaton ===
Heaton (3)
Party	Candidate	Votes	%	±%
Labour	Keith Darvill	1,109	35.7	+1.9
Labour	Denis O'Flynn	1,063	34.2	+1.5
Labour	Ramota Lawal	1,050	33.8	+2.0
Conservative	Wendy Brice-Thompson	904	29.1	+7.8
Harold Hill Ind.	Christopher Cooper	843	27.1	N/A
Conservative	Keith Wells	829	26.7	+8.9
Conservative	Garry Pain	723	23.3	+6.3
Harold Hill Ind.	Philip Hyde	673	21.7	−21.7
UKIP	Ian de Wulverton	557	17.9	−24.3
UKIP	Brian Parker	367	11.8	−31.6
UKIP	John Thurtle	296	9.5	N/A
Liberal Democrats	John Deeks	105	3.4	N/A
Turnout			30.18	
Majority		146		
Labour hold		Swing		
Labour gain from UKIP		Swing		
Labour gain from UKIP		Swing		

The following by-election took place in the ward between the 2014 and 2018 elections:

- 2016 (Labour gain from UKIP)

=== Hylands ===
Hylands (3)
Party	Candidate	Votes	%	±%
Conservative	Christine Smith	2,527	56.6	+25.4
Conservative	Andromahi Themistocli	2,509	56.2	+21.8
Conservative	Ciaran White	2,425	54.3	+21.1
Residents	Derek Ganly	1,215	27.2	−2.0
Residents	David Malillos-Cabezas	1,138	25.5	−2.2
Residents	Jody Ganly	1,121	25.1	−8.3
Labour	Neil Brindley	667	14.9	+5.4
Labour	Robert Tomlinson	631	14.1	+4.0
Labour	Mohammed Hassan	602	13.5	+2.7
Green	Amanda Haines	203	4.5	−1.6
Liberal Democrats	Susan Brewington	91	2.0	+0.5
Turnout			42.34	
Majority		1,210		
Conservative hold		Swing		
Conservative gain from Residents		Swing		
Conservative hold		Swing		

=== Mawneys ===
Mawneys (3)
Party	Candidate	Votes	%	±%
Conservative	Jason Frost	2,446	66.1	+19.1
Conservative	Dilipkumar Patel	2,276	61.5	+20.4
Conservative	Carol Smith	2,227	60.2	+14.9
Residents	Linda Trew	631	17.1	−28.2
Labour	Ian James	623	16.8	−2.4
Labour	Daniel Nichols	593	16.0	−2.5
Labour	Raymond Shaw	505	13.7	−2.6
Residents	Graham Trew	492	13.3	N/A
UKIP	Nina Bailey	354	9.6	−31.1
Liberal Democrats	Stewart Mott	145	3.9	−0.5
Turnout			36.90	
Majority		1,596		
Conservative hold		Swing		
Conservative hold		Swing		
Conservative hold		Swing		

=== Pettits ===
Pettits (3)
Party	Candidate	Votes	%	±%
Conservative	Philippa Crowder	2,143	52.9	+12.8
Conservative	Osman Dervish	1,933	47.7	+11.7
Conservative	Robby Misir	1,893	46.8	+11.9
Residents	Denis Stevens	1,461	36.1	+14.0
Residents	John Clarke	1,215	30.0	+7.4
Residents	Samantha Lammin	1,185	29.3	+8.5
Labour	Peter Wheelband	630	15.6	−2.4
Labour	Christopher Purnell	577	14.3	−3.6
Labour	Michael Wood	521	12.9	−3.8
Liberal Democrats	David Bower	191	4.7	+2.7
Turnout			38.56	
Majority		432		
Conservative hold		Swing		
Conservative hold		Swing		
Conservative hold		Swing		

=== Rainham and Wennington ===
Rainham and Wennington (3)
Party	Candidate	Votes	%	±%
Ind. Residents	Jeffrey Tucker	1,387	40.0	−12.9
Ind. Residents	David Durant	1,011	29.2	−8.0
Ind. Residents	Tony Durdin	981	28.3	−8.8
Independent	Sue Ospreay	913	26.3	N/A
Labour	Fay Hough	907	26.2	+0.2
Labour	Kim Arrowsmith	841	24.3	+4.2
Labour	Christopher Freeman	753	21.7	+3.1
Independent	Keith Roberts	710	20.5	−16.6
Independent	Jacqueline McArdle	653	18.8	N/A
Conservative	John Clark	557	16.1	+6.8
Conservative	Billy Kensit	357	10.3	+2.3
UKIP	Julian Clark	351	10.1	−24.1
Conservative	Eileen Rosindell	332	9.6	+2.6
Green	Azzees Minott	191	5.5	±0.0
Turnout			35.15	
Majority		68		
Ind. Residents hold		Swing		
Ind. Residents hold		Swing		
Ind. Residents hold		Swing		

=== Romford Town ===
Romford Town (3)
Party	Candidate	Votes	%	±%
Conservative	Joshua Chapman	2,617	56.6	+17.7
Conservative	Judith Holt	2,462	53.2	+11.9
Conservative	Nisha Patel	2,102	45.4	+11.9
Labour	Neil Cassidy	1,478	31.9	+9.6
Labour	Emma Hamblett	1,443	31.2	+12.7
Labour	Michael Yore	1,288	27.8	+8.9
Green	David Hughes	422	9.1	−3.7
Liberal Democrats	Kerrie Salt	345	7.5	+2.4
Liberal Democrats	Thomas Clarke	344	7.4	N/A
UKIP	Tyrone Patten-Walsh	344	7.4	−21.9
Liberal Democrats	Ian Sanderson	323	7.0	N/A
Turnout			36.06	
Majority		624		
Conservative hold		Swing		
Conservative hold		Swing		
Conservative hold		Swing		

=== St Andrews ===
St Andrew's (3)
Party	Candidate	Votes	%	±%
Residents	Paul Middleton	1,738	40.8	−0.1
Residents	Gerald O'Sullivan	1,705	40.0	−0.7
Conservative	John Mylod	1,626	38.1	+17.1
Residents	Bryan Vincent	1,601	37.5	+3.8
Conservative	Christopher Sutton	1,491	35.0	+15.1
Conservative	Richard Rimkus	1,438	33.7	+15.1
Labour	Janet Davis	709	16.6	+4.3
Labour	Jeffery Stafford	576	13.5	+3.5
Labour	Keith Taffs	546	12.8	+2.9
UKIP	Malvin Brown	369	8.7	−25.0
Green	Danuta Gorzynska-Hart	248	5.8	−0.9
Liberal Democrats	David Williams	150	3.5	+1.8
BNP	Denise Underwood	123	2.9	N/A
Turnout			39.43	
Majority		25		
Residents hold		Swing		
Residents hold		Swing		
Conservative gain from Residents		Swing		

=== South Hornchurch ===
South Hornchurch (3)
Party	Candidate	Votes	%	±%
Ind. Residents	Natasha Summers	1,362	39.5	−4.9
Independent	Michael Deon-Burton	1,312	38.1	−6.3
Ind. Residents	Graham Williamson	1,286	37.3	+3.2
Labour	Patricia Brown	1,043	30.3	+8.1
Labour	Trevor McKeever	1,019	29.6	+7.5
Labour	Nicholas West	939	27.3	+9.2
Ind. Residents	Phillip Bowen	811	23.5	−8.8
Conservative	George Brind	634	18.4	+3.9
Conservative	Grant Rose	561	16.3	+4.4
Conservative	Tammy Farquhar	422	12.2	+4.6
UKIP	Jane Fellowes	315	9.1	−29.2
Green	Mohammad Ali	165	4.8	−2.2
Turnout			32.43	
Majority				
Ind. Residents hold		Swing		
Independent gain from UKIP		Swing		
Ind. Residents hold		Swing		

=== Squirrel's Heath ===
Squirrel's Heath (3)
Party	Candidate	Votes	%	±%
Conservative	Melvin Wallace	2,507	67.5	+21.5
Conservative	Michael White	2,409	64.9	+21.7
Conservative	Damian White	2,392	64.4	+20.3
Labour	Joseph MacVeigh	801	21.6	+8.7
Labour	Sophia Mousoulides	793	21.4	+9.3
Labour	John McCole	751	20.2	+8.5
Green	Victoria Wiseman	519	14.0	+8.5
Liberal Democrats	Madge Mulliner	337	9.1	+6.9
Turnout			35.27	
Majority		1,591		
Conservative hold		Swing		
Conservative hold		Swing		
Conservative hold		Swing		

=== Upminster ===
Upminster (3)
Party	Candidate	Votes	%	±%
Residents	Linda Hawthorn	3,142	65.5	−2.2
Residents	Ronald Ower	3,109	64.8	−1.8
Residents	Christopher Wilkins	2,908	60.6	−1.3
Conservative	Susan Connew	1,147	23.9	+10.9
Conservative	Danny Weedon	776	16.2	+5.2
Conservative	Anastasia Ravenall	743	15.5	+6.5
Labour	Julia Darvill	517	10.8	+3.8
Labour	Patrick Chalk	459	9.6	+3.8
Labour	John Sullivan	418	8.7	+4.4
Green	Melanie Collins	358	7.5	+1.0
UKIP	James Fellowes	177	3.7	−19.7
Liberal Democrats	Bruce Carter	148	3.1	+1.2
Turnout			45.47	
Majority		1,761		
Residents hold		Swing		
Residents hold		Swing		
Residents hold		Swing		

== By-elections ==
The following by-election took place between the 2018 and 2022 elections:

- 2019 Cranham by-election
