= Harold Hill Independent Party =

The Harold Hill Independent Party
- Leader: Lorraine Moss
- Founded: 16 August 2017; 8 years ago
- Dissolved: 17 December 2018
- Headquarters: 147 Sheffield Drive; Romford; Greater London; RM3 9YB
- Ideology: Localism
- Colours: White Green

Website
- harold-hill.co.uk

The Harold Hill Independent Party was a British minor political party formed in 2017 and dissolved in 2018. It returned one candidate to the Gooshays ward at the 2018 Havering London Borough Council election. It is named for the London suburb of Harold Hill.

== Elected representatives ==
=== Havering London Borough Council ===
Councillor	Ward	First elected	Ref
Jan Sargent	Gooshays	2018	

Cllr Jan Sargent sat with the Independent Residents group on the council.

== Electoral performance ==
=== Havering London Borough Council ===
Year	Candidates	Votes	Share of votes		Seats	
2018	6	4,226	2.1%	New	1 / 54	▲1
