= Marshalls and Rise Park =

- Electoral ward for the Havering London Borough Council
- Marshalls and Rise Park ward boundaries since 2022
- Borough: Havering
- County: Greater London
- Population: 12,954 (2021) (Note: 2021 Census data reported for 2022 ward boundaries)
- Electorate: 9,843 (2022)
- Major settlements: Gidea Park, Rise Park and Romford
- Area: 3.994 square kilometres (1.542 sq mi)

Current electoral ward
- Created: 2022
- Number of members: 3
- Councillors: Robert Benham; Bailey Nash-Gardner; Gary Payne
- Created from: Pettits and Romford Town
- GSS code: E05013977

Marshalls and Rise Park is an electoral ward in the London Borough of Havering. The ward was first used in the 2022 elections. It returns three councillors to Havering London Borough Council.

== List of councillors ==
Term	Councillor	Party
2022–2026	Philippa Crowder (Note: Philippa Crowder changed parties in 2024)	Conservative
2022–2026	Philippa Crowder	Residents
2022–2026	Osman Dervish	Conservative
2022–2026	Robby Misir (Note: Robby Misir changed parties in 2024)	Conservative
2022–2026	Robby Misir	Residents
2026–present	Robert Benham	Reform
2026–present	Bailey Nash-Gardner	Reform
2026–present	Gary Payne	Reform

== Summary ==
Councillors elected by party at each general borough election.

- Conservative
- Reform

== Havering council elections ==
=== 2026 election ===
The election took place on 7 May 2026.

2026 Havering London Borough Council election: Marshalls and Rise Park (3)
Party	Candidate	Votes	%	±%
Reform	Robert Benham (Note: Councillor for Rush Green and Crowlands since 2022. Stood as a Conservative Party candidate in 2022.)	2,241		
Reform	Gary Payne	2,135		
Reform	Bailey Nash-Gardner	2,111		
Residents	Philippa Crowder	1103		
Conservative	Lucy Tully	1086		
Conservative	Nisha Patel	984		
Residents	Rob Chesney	975		
Conservative	Janina White	949		
Residents	Robby Misir	873		
Green	Michael Amaning	442		
Labour	Nick Butler	420		
Green	Suzanne Ciechomski	380		
Green	Alex Heslop	379		
Labour	Pauline Dennis	376		
Labour	Anita Pollack	359		
Liberal Democrats	Elliot Kidner	131		
Turnout			51.8	
Reform gain from Conservative		Swing		
Reform gain from Conservative		Swing		
Reform gain from Conservative		Swing		

=== 2022 election ===
The election took place on 5 May 2022.

2022 Havering London Borough Council election: Marshalls and Rise Park (3)
Party	Candidate	Votes	%	±%
Conservative	Philippa Crowder	2,122	53.7	
Conservative	Osman Dervish	1,981	50.1	
Conservative	Robby Misir	1,955	49.5	
Residents	Andrew Mann	1,440	36.4	
Residents	Kevin Barrett	1,432	36.2	
Residents	Robert Chesney	1,395	35.3	
Labour	Siobhan McGeary	547	13.8	
Labour	Birendra Singh	497	12.6	
Labour	Carol Singh	488	12.3	
Turnout			41.13%	
Majority		515	13.1	
Conservative win (new seat)				
Conservative win (new seat)				
Conservative win (new seat)				
