= Romford Town (ward) =

Electoral ward in the London Borough of Havering

- Former electoral ward for the Havering London Borough Council
- Romford Town ward boundaries
- Borough: Havering
- County: Greater London
- Population: 15,921 (2011)
- Electorate: 12,864 (2018)
- Major settlements: Romford

Former electoral ward
- Created: 2002
- Abolished: 2022
- Councillors: 3
- Replaced by: Hylands and Harrow Lodge; Marshalls and Rise Park; Mawneys; Rush Green and Crowlands; St Alban's; St Edward's; Squirrels Heath
- ONS code: 00ARGR
- GSS code: E05000319

Romford Town was an electoral ward in the London Borough of Havering from 2002 to 2022. The ward was first used in the 2002 elections and last used at the 2018 elections. It returned three councillors to Havering London Borough Council.

== List of councillors ==
The ward was represented by three councillors.

| Term | Councillor | Party |
|---|---|---|
| 2002–2014 | Andrew Curtin | Conservative |
| 2002–2018 | Wendy Brice-Thompson | Conservative |
| 2002–2018 | Frederick Thompson | Conservative |
| 2014–2022 | Joshua Chapman | Conservative |
| 2018–2022 | Judith Holt | Conservative |
| 2018–2022 | Nisha Patel | Conservative |

== Havering council elections ==
=== 2018 election ===
The election took place on 3 May 2018.

2018 Havering London Borough Council election: Romford Town (3)
| Party | Candidate | Votes | % | ±% |
|---|---|---|---|---|
| Conservative | Joshua Chapman | 2,617 | 56.6 | |
| Conservative | Judith Holt | 2,462 | 53.2 | |
| Conservative | Nisha Patel | 2,102 | 45.4 | |
| Labour | Neil Cassidy | 1,478 | 31.9 | |
| Labour | Emma Hamblett | 1,443 | 31.2 | |
| Labour | Michael Yore | 1,288 | 27.8 | |
| Green | David Hughes | 422 | 9.1 | |
| Liberal Democrats | Kerrie Salt | 345 | 7.5 | |
| Liberal Democrats | Thomas Clarke | 344 | 7.4 | |
| UKIP | Tyrone Patten-Walsh | 344 | 7.4 | |
| Liberal Democrats | Ian Sanderson | 323 | 7.0 | |
| Turnout | | | 36.06% | |
| Majority | | 624 | | |
| Conservative hold | | Swing | | |
| Conservative hold | | Swing | | |
| Conservative hold | | Swing | | |

=== 2014 election ===
The election took place on 22 May 2014.

2014 Havering London Borough Council election: Romford Town (3)
| Party | Candidate | Votes | % | ±% |
|---|---|---|---|---|
| Conservative | Wendy Brice-Thompson | 2,067 | | |
| Conservative | Joshua Chapman | 1,946 | | |
| Conservative | Frederick Thompson | 1,680 | | |
| Independent | Andrew Curtin (Note: Andrew Curtin was not selected as a Conservative candidate for the 2014 election and stood as an independent.) | 1,477 | | |
| UKIP | Bradley Whitby | 1,467 | | |
| Labour | Neil Brindley | 1,118 | | |
| Labour | Michael Yore | 945 | | |
| Labour | Stephen Jaques | 926 | | |
| Green | Amanda Haines | 639 | | |
| Liberal Democrats | John Deeks | 255 | | |
| Turnout | | | | |
| Conservative hold | | Swing | | |
| Conservative hold | | Swing | | |
| Conservative hold | | Swing | | |

=== 2010 election ===
The election on 6 May 2010 took place on the same day as the United Kingdom general election.

2010 Havering London Borough Council election: Romford Town (3)
| Party | Candidate | Votes | % | ±% |
|---|---|---|---|---|
| Conservative | Andrew Curtin | 3,198 | | |
| Conservative | Wendy Brice-Thompson | 3,186 | | |
| Conservative | Frederick Thompson | 2,993 | | |
| Labour | James Maker | 1,612 | | |
| Labour | Pervez Badruddin | 1,564 | | |
| Labour | Olajide Omotayo | 1,518 | | |
| Residents | Duncan Macpherson | 1,173 | | |
| Residents | Julie Porter | 1,149 | | |
| Residents | Edward Mckiernan | 1,123 | | |
| Turnout | | | | |
| Conservative hold | | Swing | | |
| Conservative hold | | Swing | | |
| Conservative hold | | Swing | | |

=== 2006 election ===
The election took place on 4 May 2006.

2006 Havering London Borough Council election: Romford Town (3)
| Party | Candidate | Votes | % | ±% |
|---|---|---|---|---|
| Conservative | Andrew Curtin | 1,925 | 52.6 | |
| Conservative | Wendy Brice-Thompson | 1,902 | | |
| Conservative | Frederick Thompson | 1,781 | | |
| Residents | Edward McKiernan | 812 | 22.2 | |
| Residents | Pamela Wilkes | 769 | | |
| Residents | Julie Porter | 764 | | |
| Labour | Neil Brindley | 724 | 19.8 | |
| Labour | Susan Shaw | 686 | | |
| Labour | Penelope White | 653 | | |
| Independent | Madelaine Marsden | 197 | 5.4 | |
| Independent | Michael Davis | 195 | | |
| Independent | Daniel Mannix | 163 | | |
| Turnout | | | 35.0 | |
| Conservative hold | | Swing | | |
| Conservative hold | | Swing | | |
| Conservative hold | | Swing | | |

=== 2002 election ===
The election took place on 2 May 2002. As an experiment, it was a postal voting election, with the option to hand the papers in on election day.

2002 Havering London Borough Council election: Romford Town (3)
| Party | Candidate | Votes | % | ±% |
|---|---|---|---|---|
| Conservative | Andrew Curtin | 2,336 | | |
| Conservative | Wendy Brice-Thompson | 2,312 | | |
| Conservative | Frederick Thompson | 2,238 | | |
| Labour | Angela Durso | 1,205 | | |
| Labour | Robert Kilbey | 1,143 | | |
| Labour | Peter McInerney | 1,130 | | |
| Liberal Democrats | Peter Davies | 710 | | |
| Liberal Democrats | Renee Giller | 609 | | |
| Liberal Democrats | John Porter | 605 | | |
| Turnout | | | | |
| Conservative win (new seat) | | | | |
| Conservative win (new seat) | | | | |
| Conservative win (new seat) | | | | |
