= Brooklands (Havering ward) =

Former electoral ward in the London borough of Havering, England

- Former electoral ward for the Havering London Borough Council
- Brooklands ward boundaries between 2002 and 2022
- Borough: Havering
- County: Greater London
- Population: 19,112 (2020)
- Electorate: 12,952 (2018)
- Major settlements: Romford and Rush Green
- Area: 4.2 square kilometres (1.6 sq mi)

Former electoral ward
- Created: 1978
- Abolished: 2022
- Councillors: 1978–2002: 2; 2002–2022: 3
- Replaced by: Hylands and Harrow Lodge, Rush Green and Crowlands and St Edward's
- ONS code: 02BBFC (1978–2002); 00ARGC (2002–2022)
- GSS code: E05000306 (2002–2022)

Brooklands was an electoral ward in the London Borough of Havering from 1978 to 2022. The ward was first used in the 1978 elections and last used for the 2018 elections. It returned councillors to Havering London Borough Council. It was replaced by Hylands and Harrow Lodge, Rush Green and Crowlands and St Edward's electoral wards.

== 2002–2022 Havering council elections ==
=== 2018 election ===
The election took place on 3 May 2018.

2018 Havering London Borough Council election: Brooklands (3)
Party	Candidate	Votes	%	±%
Conservative	Robert Benham	2,342	55.6	
Conservative	Timothy Ryan	2,146	51.0	
Conservative	Viddy Persaud	2,138	50.8	
Labour	Angelina Leatherbarrow	1,592	37.8	
Labour	Robert Ritchie	1,377	32.7	
Labour	Taimaz Ranjbaran	1,335	31.7	
Green	Josephine Longhurst	344	8.2	
UKIP	Stephen Kimber	290	6.9	
Liberal Democrats	Peter Davies	240	5.7	
Turnout			32.51	
Majority		554		
Conservative hold		Swing		
Conservative hold		Swing		
Conservative hold		Swing		

=== 2014 election ===
The election took place on 22 May 2014.

2014 Havering London Borough Council election: Brooklands (3)
Party	Candidate	Votes	%	±%
Conservative	Robert Benham	1,758	34.7	−13.0
Conservative	Vidyotama Persaud	1,620		
Conservative	Roger Westwood	1,545		
UKIP	Neil Connelly	1,469	29.0	N/A
UKIP	Herbert Humphries	1,413		
UKIP	Frederick Osborne	1,413		
Labour	Eamonn Mahon	1,147	22.7	−8.3
Labour	Samuel Gould	1,121		
Labour	Herbert White	1,019		
Residents	Derek Smith	273	5.3	N/A
Independent	Gaggandip Sandhu-Nelson	245	4.8	N/A
Liberal Democrats	Karen Kruzycka	171	3.4	−17.8
Turnout				
Majority				
Conservative hold		Swing		
Conservative hold		Swing		
Conservative hold		Swing		

=== 2010 election ===
The election on 6 May 2010 took place on the same day as the United Kingdom general election.

2010 Havering London Borough Council election: Brooklands (3)
Party	Candidate	Votes	%	±%
Conservative	Robert Benham	3,026		
Conservative	Frederick Osborne	2,905		
Conservative	Henry Tebbutt	2,776		
Labour	Eamonn Mahon	1,967		
Labour	Daniel Young	1,783		
Labour	John Reid	1,748		
Liberal Democrats	Peter Davies	1,346		
Liberal Democrats	Madge Mulliner	1,088		
Liberal Democrats	Karen Kruzycka	1,063		
Turnout				
Conservative hold		Swing		
Conservative hold		Swing		
Conservative hold		Swing		

=== 2006 election ===
The election took place on 4 May 2006.

2006 Havering London Borough Council election: Brooklands (3)
Party	Candidate	Votes	%	±%
Conservative	Robert Benham	1,813	45.8	
Conservative	Frederick Osborne	1,745		
Conservative	Barry Tebbutt	1,708		
Liberal Democrats	Karen Kruzycka	762	19.3	
Liberal Democrats	Paul Kruzycki	721		
Liberal Democrats	Keith Taffs	666		
Labour	Jaqueline Fingleson	602	15.2	
Labour	Ian James	574		
Labour	Stephen Jaques	534		
Residents	Eamonn Mahon	477	12.1	
Residents	Robert Taylor	415		
Residents	Ronald Couzens	407		
Green	James Caspell	301	7.6	
Turnout			37.9	
Conservative gain from Liberal Democrats		Swing		
Conservative hold		Swing		
Conservative hold		Swing		

=== 2002 election ===
The election took place on 2 May 2002. As an experiment, it was a postal voting election, with the option to hand the papers in on election day.

2002 Havering London Borough Council election: Brooklands (3)
Party	Candidate	Votes	%	±%
Liberal Democrats	Nigel Meyer	1,405		
Conservative	Henry Tebbutt	1,394		
Conservative	Jean Gower	1,377		
Conservative	Corinne Simmons	1,336		
Liberal Democrats	Patricia Rumble	1,312		
Liberal Democrats	Malcolm Zetter	1,286		
Labour	John McCole	1,122		
Labour	Sean Willis	975		
Labour	Pervez Badruddin	877		
Independent	Eamonn Mahon	608		
Turnout				
Liberal Democrats win (new boundaries)				
Conservative win (new boundaries)				
Conservative win (new boundaries)				

== 1978–2002 Havering council elections ==
Brooklands ward boundaries from 1978 to 2002

=== 1998 election ===
The election on 7 May 1998 took place on the same day as the 1998 Greater London Authority referendum.

1998 Havering London Borough Council election: Brooklands (2)
Party	Candidate	Votes	%	±%
Labour	Eamonn Mahon	750		
Labour	Jeffery Stafford	663		
Residents	Charles Fancourt	406		
Residents	Carole Burnie	398		
Conservative	Henry Tebbutt	398		
Conservative	David Hayhow	305		
Liberal Democrats	Peter Davies	126		
Liberal Democrats	John Deeks	121		
Turnout				
Labour hold				
Labour hold				

=== 1994 election ===
The election took place on 5 May 1994.

1994 Havering London Borough Council election: Brooklands (2)
Party	Candidate	Votes	%	±%
Labour	Arthur Latham	1,490	53.99	▲10.75
Labour	George Taylor	1,406		
Conservative	Henry Tebbutt	933	34.19	▼10.97
Conservative	Cyril North	901		
Residents	Eric King	331	11.82	New
Residents	Charles Vincent	303		
Registered electors		5,605		▼126
Turnout		2,788	49.74	▼2.38
Rejected ballots		3	0.11	▼0.06
Labour hold				
Labour gain from Conservative				

=== 1990 election ===
The election took place on 3 May 1990.

1990 Havering London Borough Council election: Brooklands (2)
Party	Candidate	Votes	%	±%
Labour	Arthur Latham	1,415	43.24	
Conservative	Henry Tebbutt	1,404	45.16	
Conservative	Michael White	1,320		
Labour Co-op	Sheila McCole	1,193		
Green	Anthony Edwards	350	11.60	
Registered electors		5,731		
Turnout		2,987	52.12	
Rejected ballots		5	0.17	
Labour gain from Conservative				
Conservative gain from Labour				

=== 1986 election ===
The election took place on 8 May 1986.

1986 Havering London Borough Council election: Brooklands (2)
Party	Candidate	Votes	%	±%
Conservative	Henry Tebbutt	857		
Labour	Arthur Latham	773		
Conservative	Roland Vials	697		
Labour	Diane Tomlinson	687		
Alliance	Eden Mulliner	652		
Alliance	Graham Potter	609		
Turnout				
Conservative hold		Swing		
Labour gain from Conservative		Swing		

=== 1982 election ===
The election took place on 6 May 1982.

1982 Havering London Borough Council election: Brooklands (2)
Party	Candidate	Votes	%	±%
Conservative	Henry Tebbutt	1,271		
Conservative	Roland Vials	1,030		
Labour	William Harrison	697		
Labour	Michael Blake	690		
Alliance	Charles Brooks	520		
Alliance	Linda Foord	456		
Turnout				
Majority				
Conservative hold		Swing		
Conservative hold		Swing		

=== 1978 election ===
The election took place on 4 May 1978.

1978 Havering London Borough Council election: Brooklands (2)
Party	Candidate	Votes	%	±%
Conservative	Henry Tebbutt	1,233		
Conservative	Meirion Owens	1,209		
Labour	George Cox	1,141		
Labour	Jesse Taylor	1,063		
Turnout				
Conservative win (new seat)				
Conservative win (new seat)				
