= Glen Maney =

Stand-up comedian, actor, film director, writer, politician (born 1964)

- Born: 13 October 1964 (age 61); Battersea, London, England, U.K.
- Occupations: Comedian, actor, film director, writer, politician

Glen Maney (born 13 October 1964, in Battersea) is a comedian, actor, writer, film director, and politician.

== Career ==
In 2011, he became National Secretary of the National Liberal Party. He has conducted several undercover investigations into the effect European Union migration is having on British workers. In April 2014, he resigned as the National Secretary of The National Liberal Party citing a difference of opinion in how to move the party forward with other executive committee members and an increasing workload.

He wrote, directed and acted in a film called The Limelight (2012). He sold the rights to the script in 2001, though the film initially fell through due to financing problems and reverted to him. It is the story of a comedian named Gary Shand, trying to make a career of his avocation while revealing his personal struggles with addictions. The low-budget work has been characterized as a "black comedy". One review said it was an uneven mess ("more miss than hit") with an unblinking and unremitting downbeat portrayal of its subject. Other reviews stated that it was "part tear-jerker, part life-affirming comedy". On 21 May 2012, The Limelight was a hit at The London Independent Film Festival where it sold out and was a featured film.

He appears opposite Timothy Spall, as Bus Driver Ken in the 2021 drama film The Last Bus, directed by Gillies MacKinnon.

He announced his intention to stand for U.K. parliament in the 2015 elections.
