= St Edward's (ward) =

- Electoral ward for the Havering London Borough Council
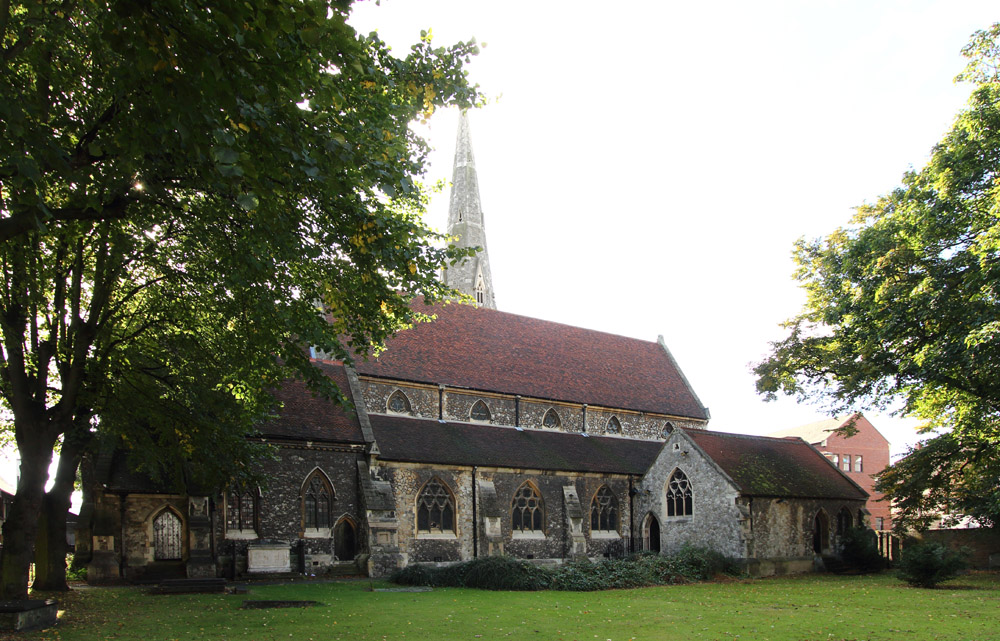
- The ward is named for the Church of St Edward the Confessor in Market Place
- St Edward's ward boundaries since 2022
- Borough: Havering
- County: Greater London
- Population: 10,423 (2021) (Note: 2021 Census data reported for 2022 ward boundaries)
- Electorate: 7,345 (2022)
- Major settlements: Gidea Park and Romford
- Area: 1.668 square kilometres (0.644 sq mi)

Current electoral ward
- Created: 1978–2002 (first creation); 2022 (second creation)
- Number of members: 1978–2002: 2; 2022–present: 3
- Councillors: Terry Brown; Martin Lardner; Sathya Maddasani
- Created from: Brooklands, Romford Town, Squirrel's Heath in 2022
- GSS code: E05013983 (2022–present)

St Edward's is an electoral ward in the London Borough of Havering. The ward was originally created in 1978 and abolished in 2002. It was created again in 2022. It returns councillors to Havering London Borough Council.

== List of councillors ==
Term	Councillor	Party
1978–1998	Lydia Hutton	Conservative
1978–1986	Roger Ramsey	Conservative
1986–1994	Ann Cockerton	Conservative
1994–1998	Charles Harrison	Liberal Democrats
1998–2002	Raymond Connelly	Conservative
1998–2002	Wendy Thompson	Conservative
2022–2026	Joshua Chapman	Conservative
2022–2026	David Taylor	Conservative
2022–2026	Nisha Patel	Conservative
2026–present	Terry Brown	Reform
2026–present	Martin Lardner	Reform
2026–present	Sathya Maddasani	Reform

== Havering council elections since 2022 ==
There was a revision of ward boundaries in Havering in 2022.

=== 2026 election ===
The election took place on 7 May 2026.

2026 Havering London Borough Council election: St Edward's (3)
Party	Candidate	Votes	%	±%
Reform	Terry Brown	1,108		
Reform	Martin Lardner	1,075		
Reform	Sathya Maddasani	965		
Conservative	Wendy Brice-Thompson	732		
Conservative	Roy Chowdhury	680		
Conservative	Svetlana Joao	568		
Green	Alexandra Betkowska	552		
Labour	Emma Hawkins	547		
Green	Scott Donovan	494		
Labour	Alex Navarro-James	453		
Labour	Pushpa Makwana	452		
Green	Kieron Thomson-Turnage	424		
Residents	Dianne Thomson	411		
Residents	Jody Ganly	359		
Residents	Nuno Justo	319		
Liberal Democrats	Tej Singh	120		
Turnout			42.32	
Reform gain from Conservative		Swing		
Reform gain from Conservative		Swing		
Reform gain from Conservative		Swing		

=== 2022 election ===
The election took place on 5 May 2022.

2022 Havering London Borough Council election: St Edward's (3)
Party	Candidate	Votes	%	±%
Conservative	Joshua Chapman	1,108	47.2	N/A
Conservative	David Taylor	1,003	42.7	N/A
Conservative	Nisha Patel	952	40.5	N/A
Residents	Ann Kendrick	662	28.2	N/A
Residents	Alexander Stilwell	602	25.6	N/A
Labour	Alexander Leatherbarrow	594	25.3	N/A
Labour	Deborah Williams	589	25.1	N/A
Labour	Abiodun Adesanya	588	25.0	N/A
Residents	David Tyler	526	22.4	N/A
Green	Karen Kruzycka	210	8.9	N/A
Liberal Democrats	Peter Davies	120	5.1	N/A
Liberal Democrats	Kerrie Sait	92	3.9	N/A
Turnout			32.87%	N/A
Majority		290	12.3	N/A
Conservative win (new seat)				
Conservative win (new seat)				
Conservative win (new seat)				

== 1978–2002 Havering council elections ==
St Edward's ward boundaries from 1978 to 2002

=== 1998 election ===
The election on 7 May 1998 took place on the same day as the 1998 Greater London Authority referendum.

1998 Havering London Borough Council election: St Edward's (2)
Party	Candidate	Votes	%	±%
Conservative	Raymond Connelly	560		
Conservative	Wendy Thompson	526		
Residents	George Montgomery	447		
Labour	George Taylor	445		
Liberal Democrats	Eden Mulliner	436		
Labour	Caroline Warren	435		
Liberal Democrats	David Williams	421		
Residents	Pamela Wilkes	378		
Turnout				
Conservative hold		Swing		
Conservative gain from Liberal Democrats		Swing		

=== 1994 election ===
The election took place on 5 May 1994.

1994 Havering London Borough Council election: St Edward's (2)
Party	Candidate	Votes	%	±%
Conservative	Lydia Hutton	821	35.45	▼22.32
Liberal Democrats	Charles Harrison	820	36.07	New
Liberal Democrats	Helen Tegg	805		
Conservative	Ann Cockerton	776		
Labour	Michael Flynn	642	28.48	▼13.75
Labour	Patricia Brown	641		
Registered electors		5,075		Steady
Turnout		2,363	46.56	▲0.39
Rejected ballots		5	0.21	▼0.52
Conservative hold		Swing		
Liberal Democrats gain from Conservative		Swing		

=== 1990 election ===
The election took place on 3 May 1990.

1990 Havering London Borough Council election: St Edward's (2)
Party	Candidate	Votes	%	±%
Conservative	Lydia Hutton	1,272	57.77	
Conservative	Ann Cockerton	1,225		
Labour	Michael Hann	940	42.23	
Labour Co-op	John Bowyer	885		
Registered electors		5,075		
Turnout		2,343	46.17	
Rejected ballots		17	0.73	
Conservative hold		Swing		
Conservative hold		Swing		

=== 1986 election ===
The election took place on 8 May 1986.

1986 Havering London Borough Council election: St Edward's (2)
Party	Candidate	Votes	%	±%
Conservative	Lydia Hutton	1,020		
Conservative	Ann Cockerton	992		
Labour	John John	543		
Labour	Joseph Moore	473		
Alliance	Betty McDowell	390		
Alliance	Peter Osborne	363		
Green	May Burgess	87		
Turnout				
Conservative hold		Swing		
Conservative hold		Swing		

=== 1982 election ===
The election took place on 6 May 1982.

1982 Havering London Borough Council election: St Edward's (2)
Party	Candidate	Votes	%	±%
Conservative	Lydia Hutton	1,329		
Conservative	Roger Ramsey	1,324		
Alliance	Keith Penfold	476		
Alliance	Michael Long	465		
Labour	Patrick Gilley	348		
Labour	Frederick Kaler	328		
Turnout				
Conservative hold		Swing		
Conservative hold		Swing		

=== 1978 election ===
The election took place on 4 May 1978.

1978 Havering London Borough Council election: St Edward's (2)
Party	Candidate	Votes	%	±%
Conservative	Lydia Hutton	1,631		
Conservative	Roger Ramsey	1,549		
Labour	Jeannette Bowyer	635		
Labour	Albert Mills	556		
Turnout				
Conservative win (new seat)				
Conservative win (new seat)				
