= Maney, Minnesota =

Maney
- Unincorporated community
- Location within Minnesota Location within the United States
- Coordinates: 46°59′25″N 92°36′29″W
- Country: United States
- State: Minnesota
- County: St. Louis
- Elevation: 1,342 ft (409 m)
- Time zone: UTC-6 (Central (CST))
  - Summer (DST): UTC-5 (CDT)
- Area code: 218
- GNIS feature ID: 661855

Maney is an unincorporated community in St. Louis County, in the U.S. state of Minnesota.

The community was named for E. J. Maney, a railroad official.
