= Upminster (ward) =

Electoral ward in the London borough of Havering

- Electoral ward for the Havering London Borough Council
- Upminster ward boundaries since 2022
- Borough: Havering
- County: Greater London
- Population: 13,347 (2021) (Note: 2021 Census data reported for 2022 ward boundaries)
- Electorate: 10,359 (2022)
- Major settlements: Upminster and North Ockendon
- Area: 22.54 square kilometres (8.70 sq mi)

Current electoral ward
- Created: 1965
- Number of members: 3
- Councillors: Oscar Ford; Christopher Wilkins; Michael Fisher
- GSS code: E05000323 (2002–2022); E05013986 (2022–present)

Upminster is an electoral ward in the London Borough of Havering. The ward has existed since the creation of the borough on 1 April 1965 and was first used in the 1964 elections. It returns councillors to Havering London Borough Council.

== List of councillors ==
Term	Councillor	Party
1964–1968	T. Dix	Residents
1964–1968	Kenneth Hay	Residents
1964–1974	F. Morley	Residents
1968–1974	F. Everett	Residents
1968–1974	R. Manning	Residents
1974–1982; 1986–1990	Bruce Gordon-Picking	Conservative
1974–1981	Rodney Chamberlain	Conservative
1974–1978	L. Reilly	Conservative
1978–1982	Joyce White	Conservative
1981–1986	Geoffrey Lewis	Residents
1982–1990	Norman Kemble	Conservative
1982–1990	Jean Frost	Conservative
1990–2006	Owen Ware	Residents
1990–2023	Linda Hawthorn	Residents
1990–2010	Muriel Mylod	Residents
2006–2018	Linda Van den Hende	Residents
2010–2022	Ron Ower	Residents
2018–present	Christopher Wilkins	Residents
2022–present	Oscar Ford	Residents
2023–2026	Jacqueline Williams	Residents
2026–present	Michael Fisher	Residents

== Summary ==
Councillors elected by party at each general borough election.

- Residents
- Conservative

== Havering council elections since 2022 ==
There was a revision of ward boundaries in Havering in 2022 and the Upminster ward was unaltered.

=== 2026 election ===
The election took place on 7 May 2026.

2026 Havering London Borough Council election: Upminster (3)
Party	Candidate	Votes	%	±%
Residents	Oscar Ford	2,770	47.1	−24.1
Residents	Michael Fisher	2,633		
Residents	Christopher Wilkins	2,541		
Reform	Leslie Montague-Nahla	1,950		
Reform	Sam Tiwari	1,824		
Reform	Mahbub Rahman	1,697		
Conservative	Christopher Nicholls	647		
Conservative	Ian de Wulverton	627		
Conservative	Oliver Rose	592		
Green	Noel Richardson	394		
Green	Rowan Elworthy	342		
Labour	Simon Darvill	334		
Labour	Patrick Chalk	308		
Green	Riley Rogers	288		
Labour	Keane Handley	240		
Liberal Democrats	Jessica Townsend	112		
Turnout			56.4	
Residents hold		Swing		
Residents hold		Swing		
Residents hold		Swing		

=== 2023 by-election ===
The by-election took place on 10 August 2023, following the death of Linda Hawthorn.

2023 Upminster by-election
Party	Candidate	Votes	%	±%
Residents	Jacqueline Williams	1,642	63.2	
Conservative	Edward Green	421	16.2	
Labour	John Sullivan	234	9.0	
Independent	David Durant	150	5.8	
Green	Melanie Collins	115	4.4	
Liberal Democrats	Thomas Clark	35	1.3	
Majority		1,221	47.0	
Turnout		2,597		
Residents hold		Swing		

=== 2022 election ===
The election took place on 5 May 2022.

2022 Havering London Borough Council election: Upminster (3)
Party	Candidate	Votes	%	±%
Residents	Linda Hawthorn	3,028	71.2	+5.7
Residents	Oscar Ford	2,954	69.5	+4.7
Residents	Christopher Wilkins	2,930	68.9	+8.3
Conservative	Adam Baker	953	22.4	−1.5
Conservative	Sally Miller	711	16.7	+0.5
Conservative	Bernice Robinson	584	13.7	−1.8
Labour	Patrick Chalk	453	10.7	−0.1
Labour	Suzanne McGeary	419	9.9	+0.3
Green	Melanie Collins	362	8.5	+1.0
Labour	John Sullivan	362	8.5	−0.2
Turnout			42.3	−3.17
Majority		1,977	46.5	+9.8
Residents hold		Swing		
Residents hold		Swing		
Residents hold		Swing		

== 2002–2022 Havering council elections ==
Upminster ward boundaries from 2002 to 2022

There was a revision of ward boundaries in Havering in 2002.

=== 2018 election ===
The election took place on 3 May 2018.

2018 Havering London Borough Council election: Upminster (3)
Party	Candidate	Votes	%	±%
Residents	Linda Hawthorn	3,142	65.5	
Residents	Ron Ower	3,109	64.8	
Residents	Christopher Wilkins	2,908	60.6	
Conservative	Susan Connew	1,147	23.9	
Conservative	Danny Weedon	776	16.2	
Conservative	Anastasia Ravenall	743	15.5	
Labour	Julia Darvill	517	10.8	
Labour	Patrick Chalk	459	9.6	
Labour	John Sullivan	418	8.7	
Green	Melanie Collins	358	7.5	
UKIP	James Fellowes	177	3.7	
Liberal Democrats	Bruce Carter	148	3.1	
Turnout			45.47	
Majority		1,761		
Residents hold		Swing		
Residents hold		Swing		
Residents hold		Swing		

=== 2014 election ===
The election took place on 22 May 2014.

2014 Havering London Borough Council election: Upminster (3)
Party	Candidate	Votes	%	±%
Residents	Linda Hawthorn	3,507		
Residents	Ron Ower	3,447		
Residents	Linda Van den Hende	3,204		
UKIP	Malvin Brown	1,212		
Conservative	Donna Gibson	673		
Conservative	Danny Weedon	572		
Conservative	Poh Foong	465		
Labour	Julia Darvill	364		
Green	Melanie Collins	338		
Labour	Kate Darvill	298		
Labour	Rosetta Reehill	223		
Liberal Democrats	Bruce Carter	98		
Turnout				
Residents hold		Swing		
Residents hold		Swing		
Residents hold		Swing		

=== 2010 election ===
The election on 6 May 2010 took place on the same day as the United Kingdom general election.

2010 Havering London Borough Council election: Upminster (3)
Party	Candidate	Votes	%	±%
Residents	Ron Ower	4,871		
Residents	Linda Hawthorn	4,839		
Residents	Linda Van den Hende	4,603		
Conservative	Catherine Bull	1,939		
Conservative	Alan Bruniges	1,636		
Conservative	Alexander Mckenzie	1,378		
Labour	Simon Darvill	742		
UKIP	Thomas Mulcahy	587		
Labour	Margaret Lindsay	531		
Labour	Rachel Harris	531		
Green	Melanie Collins	173		
Green	Philip Butler	71		
Green	Ian Pirie	65		
Independent	Ena Risby	50		
Turnout				
Residents hold		Swing		
Residents hold		Swing		
Residents hold		Swing		

=== 2006 election ===
The election took place on 4 May 2006.

2006 Havering London Borough Council election: Upminster (3)
Party	Candidate	Votes	%	±%
Residents	Linda Hawthorn	3,254	59.8	
Residents	Muriel Mylod	3,137		
Residents	Linda Van den Hende	2,897		
Conservative	Claire Palmer	1,119	20.6	
Conservative	Richard Pyke	1,019		
Conservative	Matthew Walsh	947		
Green	Melanie Collins	396	7.3	
Labour	David Scott	304	5.6	
Labour	Matthew Carr	301		
UKIP	Ted Barrett	261	4.8	
Labour	Diane Willis	232		
Independent	Ron Hodgson	108	2.0	
Independent	Alfredo Dias	72		
Turnout			48.6	
Residents hold		Swing		
Residents hold		Swing		
Residents hold		Swing		

=== 2002 election ===
The election took place on 2 May 2002. As an experiment, it was a postal voting election, with the option to hand the papers in on election day.

2002 Havering London Borough Council election: Upminster (3)
Party	Candidate	Votes	%	±%
Residents	Linda Hawthorn	4,202		
Residents	Owen Ware	4,119		
Residents	Muriel Mylod	4,082		
Conservative	Guy Gower	979		
Conservative	Susan Gower	950		
Conservative	Gloria Passannante	894		
Labour	Andrew Darvill	618		
Labour	Patricia Brown	520		
Labour	David Scott	456		
Green	Melanie Collins	297		
Turnout				
Residents win (new boundaries)				
Residents win (new boundaries)				
Residents win (new boundaries)				

== 1978–2002 Havering council elections ==
Upminster ward boundaries from 1978 to 1994

There was a revision of ward boundaries in Havering in 1978. The boundaries of the ward were subject to a very minor boundary change on 1 April 1994 that did not affect the population.

=== 1998 election ===
The election on 7 May 1998 took place on the same day as the 1998 Greater London Authority referendum.

1998 Havering London Borough Council election: Upminster (3)
Party	Candidate	Votes	%	±%
Residents	Linda Hawthorn	3,012		
Residents	Owen Ware	2,935		
Residents	Muriel Mylod	2,902		
Labour	Patricia Brown	480		
Labour	David Scott	412		
Labour	Renata Martins	405		
Conservative	Patricia Jones	372		
Conservative	Carol Roberts	344		
Turnout				
Residents hold		Swing		
Residents hold		Swing		
Residents hold		Swing		

=== 1994 election ===
The election took place on 5 May 1994.

1994 Havering London Borough Council election: Upminster (3)
Party	Candidate	Votes	%	±%
Residents	Linda Hawthorn	3,007	68.38	▲25.02
Residents	Owen Ware	3,001		
Residents	Muriel Mylod	2,971		
Conservative	Eric Nicholls	875	19.76	▼21.90
Conservative	Guy Gower	870		
Conservative	Grace Cudby	850		
Labour	Stuart Brittain	533	11.86	▼3.12
Labour	David Hill	514		
Labour	Ann Georgiou	511		
Registered electors		8,459		▲16
Turnout		4,645	54.91	▼1.56
Rejected ballots		7	0.15	▼0.02
Residents hold		Swing		
Residents hold		Swing		
Residents hold		Swing		

=== 1990 election ===
The election took place on 3 May 1990.

1990 Havering London Borough Council election: Upminster (3)
Party	Candidate	Votes	%	±%
Residents	Owen Ware	2,076	43.36	
Residents	Linda Hawthorn	1,999		
Residents	Muriel Mylod	1,976		
Conservative	Frank Everett	1,947	41.66	
Conservative	Bruce Gordon-Picking	1,937		
Conservative	Norman Kemble	1,931		
Labour	Stuart Brittain	719	14.98	
Labour	Keith Darvill	705		
Labour	Margaret Hoepelman	667		
Registered electors		8,443		
Turnout		4,768	56.47	
Rejected ballots		8	0.17	
Residents gain from Conservative		Swing		
Residents gain from Conservative		Swing		
Residents gain from Conservative		Swing		

=== 1986 election ===
The election took place on 8 May 1986.

1986 Havering London Borough Council election: Upminster (3)
Party	Candidate	Votes	%	±%
Conservative	Bruce Gordon-Picking	1,835		
Conservative	Jean Frost	1,821		
Conservative	Norman Kemble	1,807		
Ratepayers	Geoffrey Lewis	1,784		
Ratepayers	Joan Lewis	1,700		
Ratepayers	Owen Ware	1,639		
Labour	Tom Horlock	401		
Labour	Margaret Pickford	393		
Labour	James Abrey	392		
Alliance	Margery Ford	366		
Alliance	Colin McArdle	350		
Alliance	Douglas Peters	333		
Turnout				
Conservative gain from Ratepayers		Swing		
Conservative hold		Swing		
Conservative hold		Swing		

=== 1982 election ===
The election took place on 6 May 1982.

1982 Havering London Borough Council election: Upminster (3)
Party	Candidate	Votes	%	±%
Ratepayers	Geoffrey Lewis	2,090		
Conservative	Norman Kemble	2,016		
Conservative	Jean Frost	2,000		
Ratepayers	Joan Lewis	1,974		
Ratepayers	Owen Ware	1,926		
Conservative	Doreen White	1,894		
Alliance	Martin Taylor	464		
Alliance	Anthony Gunton	439		
Alliance	Rodney Dorken	429		
Labour	David Burn	246		
Labour	Peter Baines	237		
Labour	Glyn Harris	226		
Turnout				
Ratepayers hold		Swing		
Conservative hold		Swing		
Conservative hold		Swing		

=== 1981 by-election ===
The by-election took place on 12 March 1981, following the resignation of Rodney Chamberlain.

1981 Upminster by-election
Party	Candidate	Votes	%	±%
Ratepayers	Geoffrey Lewis	2,202		
Conservative	Normal Kemble	1,185		
Labour	Keith Dutton	317		
Liberal	Derek Brown	203		
Turnout				
Ratepayers gain from Conservative		Swing		

=== 1978 election ===
The election took place on 4 May 1978.

1978 Havering London Borough Council election: Upminster (3)
Party	Candidate	Votes	%	±%
Conservative	Bruce Gordon-Picking	2,613		
Conservative	Rodney Chamberlain	2,547		
Conservative	Joyce White	2,467		
Ratepayers	Geoffrey Lewis	1,991		
Ratepayers	Carol Springthorpe	1,943		
Ratepayers	Owen Ware	1,920		
Labour	Megan Lamb	449		
Labour	Joseph Moore	365		
Labour	William Nicholls	351		
Turnout				
Conservative win (new boundaries)				
Conservative win (new boundaries)				
Conservative win (new boundaries)				

== 1964–1978 Havering council elections ==
External image
- Map showing Upminster ward boundaries from 1965 to 1978

For elections to the Greater London Council, the ward was part of the Havering electoral division from 1965 and then the Upminster division from 1973.

=== 1974 election ===
The election took place on 2 May 1974.

1974 Havering London Borough Council election: Upminster (3)
Party	Candidate	Votes	%	±%
Conservative	Bruce Gordon-Picking	2,334		
Conservative	Rodney Chamberlain	2,242		
Conservative	L. Reilly	2,080		
Ind. Ratepayers	F. Everett	1,906		
Ind. Ratepayers	R. Manning	1,752		
Ind. Ratepayers	F. Morley	1,736		
Labour	C. Murray	399		
Labour	J. Scott	333		
Labour	L. Thompson	321		
Turnout				
Conservative gain from Ind. Ratepayers		Swing		
Conservative gain from Ind. Ratepayers		Swing		
Conservative gain from Ind. Ratepayers		Swing		

=== 1971 election ===
The election took place on 13 May 1971.

1971 Havering London Borough Council election: Upminster (3)
Party	Candidate	Votes	%	±%
Ind. Ratepayers	F. Everett	2,245		
Ind. Ratepayers	F. Morley	2,201		
Ind. Ratepayers	R. Manning	2,196		
Conservative	O. Collins	1,669		
Conservative	Bruce Gordon-Picking	1,635		
Conservative	L. Reilly	1,554		
Labour	S. Miller	433		
Labour	S. Gibson	412		
Labour	M. Hoepelman	394		
Liberal	P. Atkinson	164		
Liberal	A. Rabone	160		
Liberal	D. Kruger	120		
Turnout				
Ind. Ratepayers hold		Swing		
Ind. Ratepayers hold		Swing		
Ind. Ratepayers hold		Swing		

=== 1968 election ===
1968 Havering London Borough Council election: Upminster (3)
Party	Candidate	Votes	%	±%
Ind. Residents	F. Everett	2,631		
Ind. Residents	R. Manning	2,603		
Ind. Residents	F. Morley	2,592		
Conservative	O. Collins	1,755		
Conservative	P. Ellis	1,728		
Conservative	R. Guest	1,723		
Labour	W. Mansfield	264		
Labour	H. Sparks	216		
Labour	A. Booton	212		
Liberal	A. Rabone	167		
Liberal	B. Thame	162		
Liberal	G. Burnett	153		
Turnout				
Ind. Residents gain from Independent		Swing		
Ind. Residents gain from Independent		Swing		
Ind. Residents gain from Independent		Swing		

=== 1964 election ===
The election took place on 7 May 1964.

1964 Havering London Borough Council election: Upminster (3)
Party	Candidate	Votes	%	±%
Independent	T. Dix	2,403		
Independent	Kenneth Hay	2,339		
Independent	F. Morley	2,270		
Conservative	C. Ellis	1,305		
Conservative	O. Collins	1,241		
Conservative	P. Dughes	1,202		
Labour	W. Mills	347		
Labour	G. Miles	334		
Labour	S. Moore	328		
Turnout		3,965	46.2	
Independent win (new seat)				
Independent win (new seat)				
Independent win (new seat)				
