= Pettits (ward) =

- Former electoral ward for the Havering London Borough Council
- Pettits ward boundaries
- Borough: Havering
- County: Greater London

Former electoral ward
- Created: 2002
- Abolished: 2022
- Councillors: 3
- Replaced by: Marshalls and Rise Park, Mawneys
- GSS code: E05000317

Pettits was an electoral ward in the London Borough of Havering from 2002 to 2022. The ward was first used in the 2002 elections and last used at the 2018 elections. It returned three councillors to Havering London Borough Council.

== Havering council elections ==
=== 2018 election ===
The election took place on 3 May 2018.

2018 Havering London Borough Council election: Pettits
Party	Candidate	Votes	%	±%
Conservative	Philippa Crowder	2,143	52.9	
Conservative	Osman Dervish	1,933	47.7	
Conservative	Robby Misir	1,893	46.8	
Residents	Denis Stevens	1,461	36.1	
Residents	John Clarke	1,215	30.0	
Residents	Samantha Lammin	1,185	29.3	
Labour	Peter Wheelband	630	15.6	
Labour	Christopher Purnell	577	14.3	
Labour	Michael Wood	521	12.9	
Liberal Democrats	David Bower	191	4.7	
Turnout			38.56%	
Majority		432		
Conservative hold		Swing		
Conservative hold		Swing		
Conservative hold		Swing		

=== 2014 election ===
The election took place on 22 May 2014.

2014 Havering London Borough Council election: Pettits
Party	Candidate	Votes	%	±%
Conservative	Philippa Crowder	2,102		
Conservative	Osman Dervish	1,887		
Conservative	Robby Misir	1,827		
UKIP	Edward Eden	1,498		
UKIP	Katrina Birch	1,488		
UKIP	Henry Tebbutt	1,367		
Residents	Denis Stevens	1,157		
Residents	Philip Wailing	1,091		
Residents	Samantha LAmmin	1,185		
Labour	Matthew Reid	942		
Labour	John McCole	939		
Labour	Umar Kankima	874		
Liberal Democrats	Michael McCarthy	105		
Turnout			50	
Conservative hold		Swing		
Conservative hold		Swing		
Conservative hold		Swing		

=== 2010 election ===
The election on 6 May 2010 took place on the same day as the United Kingdom general election.

2010 Havering London Borough Council election: Pettits
Party	Candidate	Votes	%	±%
Conservative	Michael Armstrong	3,707		
Conservative	Edward Eden	3,572		
Conservative	Robby Misir	3,032		
Residents	Peter Goldsmith	2,398		
Residents	Ian Wilkes	2,395		
Residents	Philip Wailing	2,045		
Labour	Siobhan Mcgeary	963		
Labour	Sean Rogers	916		
Labour	Ben Kilpatrick	890		
Turnout				
Conservative hold		Swing		
Conservative hold		Swing		
Conservative hold		Swing		

=== 2006 election ===
The election took place on 4 May 2006.

2006 Havering London Borough Council election: Pettits
Party	Candidate	Votes	%	±%
Conservative	Michael Armstrong	2,636	54.7	
Conservative	Edward Eden	2,567		
Conservative	Kevin Gregory	2,485		
Residents	Ian Wilkes	1,385	28.7	
Residents	Denis Stevens	1,379		
Residents	Duncan Macpherson	1,282		
Labour	James Forsyth	410	8.5	
Labour	Ben Kilpatrick	370		
Labour	John McCole	368		
UKIP	James Fellowes	207	4.3	
Independent	June Watson	180	3.7	
UKIP	Yogendra Sharma	152		
Turnout			45.8	
Conservative hold		Swing		
Conservative hold		Swing		
Conservative hold		Swing		

=== 2002 election ===
The election took place on 2 May 2002. As an experiment, it was a postal voting election, with the option to hand the papers in on election day.

2002 Havering London Borough Council election: Pettits
Party	Candidate	Votes	%	±%
Conservative	Joseph Webster	2,688		
Conservative	Henry Tebbutt	2,660		
Conservative	Ray Morgon	2,565		
Residents	Valerie Evans	2,005		
Residents	Ian Wilkes	1,991		
Residents	Denis Stevens	1,885		
Labour	Pamela Craig	659		
Labour	Richard Packer	625		
Labour	Herbert White	608		
Turnout				
Conservative win (new seat)				
Conservative win (new seat)				
Conservative win (new seat)				
