= Hylands and Harrow Lodge =

Electoral ward

- Electoral ward for the Havering London Borough Council
- Hylands and Harrow Lodge ward boundaries since 2022
- Borough: Havering
- County: Greater London
- Population: 13,758 (2021) (Note: 2021 Census data reported for 2022 ward boundaries)
- Electorate: 10,677 (2022)
- Major settlements: Hornchurch
- Area: 2.931 square kilometres (1.132 sq mi)

Current electoral ward
- Created: 2022
- Number of members: 3
- Councillors: Kevin Gill; Sean McMahon; Maggie Themistocli
- Created from: Hylands, Brooklands and Romford Town
- GSS code: E05013976

Hylands and Harrow Lodge is an electoral ward in the London Borough of Havering. The ward was first used in the 2022 elections. It returns three councillors to Havering London Borough Council.

The ward is made up of the entirety of the previous ward of Hylands with a few streets taken from the wards of Brooklands and Romford Town in the Roneo Corner area.

It is named for Harrow Lodge Park and Hylands Park.

== List of councillors ==
Term	Councillor	Party
2022–2026	James Glass	Residents
2022–2026	John Wood	Residents
2022–2026	Christine Smith (Note: Christine Smith changed parties in 2024)	Conservative
2022–2026	Christine Smith	Residents
2026–present	Kevin Gill	Reform
2026–present	Sean McMahon	Reform
2026–present	Maggie Themistocli	Reform

== Summary ==
Councillors elected by party at each general borough election.

- Residents
- Conservative
- Reform

== Havering council elections ==
=== 2026 election ===
The election took place on 7 May 2026.

2026 Havering London Borough Council election: Hylands and Harrow Lodge (3)
Party	Candidate	Votes	%	±%
Reform	Kevin Gill	2,271		
Reform	Sean McMahon	2,212		
Reform	Maggie Themistocli	2,173		
Residents	Jay Belshaw	1,824		
Residents	Christine Smith	1,818		
Residents	Ciaran White	1,728		
Conservative	Marco Caporaso	530		
Conservative	Tracey McEvoy	511		
Conservative	Ashley Kissin	498		
Green	Erin Bush	497		
Labour	Pat Farrell	456		
Green	Erin Hickman	432		
Green	Sami Khan	403		
Labour	Susan Jiggens	377		
Labour	David Wood	333		
Liberal Democrats	Wesley Pollard	90		
Turnout			50.31	
Reform gain from Residents		Swing		
Reform gain from Residents		Swing		
Reform gain from Conservative		Swing		

=== 2022 election ===
The election took place on 5 May 2022.

2022 Havering London Borough Council election: Hylands and Harrow Lodge (3)
Party	Candidate	Votes	%	±%
Residents	James Glass	1,729	46.8	
Residents	John Wood	1,713	46.3	
Conservative	Christine Smith	1,596	43.2	
Conservative	Ciaran White	1,483	40.1	
Conservative	Alexander Donald	1,476	39.9	
Labour	Robert Farnsworth	822	22.2	
Labour	Michael Wood	756	20.4	
Labour	Mohammad Hassan	689	18.6	
Green	Amanda Haines	562	15.2	
English Constitution Party	Colin Birch	140	3.8	
English Constitution Party	Jane Birch	125	3.4	
Turnout			37.83%	
Residents win (new seat)				
Residents win (new seat)				
Conservative win (new seat)				
