= Rush Green and Crowlands =

- Electoral ward for the Havering London Borough Council
- Rush Green and Crowlands ward boundaries since 2022
- Borough: Havering
- County: Greater London
- Population: 16,022 (2021) (Note: 2021 Census data reported for 2022 ward boundaries)
- Electorate: 10,324 (2022)
- Major settlements: Romford, Rush Green
- Area: 3.745 square kilometres (1.446 sq mi)

Current electoral ward
- Created: 2022
- Number of members: 3
- Councillors: Alex Donald; Henry Williams; Petru Dinsorean
- Created from: Brooklands, Romford Town
- GSS code: E05013980

Rush Green and Crowlands is an electoral ward in the London Borough of Havering. The ward was first used in the 2022 elections. It returns three councillors to Havering London Borough Council.

== List of councillors ==
Term	Councillor	Party
2022–2026	Robert Benham (Note: Robert Benham changed parties in 2026.)	Conservative
2022–2026	Robert Benham	Reform
2022–2026	Vidyotama Persaud	Conservative
2022–2026	Timothy Ryan	Conservative
2026–present	Petru Dinsorean	Reform
2026–present	Henry Williams	Reform
2026–present	Petru Dinsorean	Reform

== Havering council elections ==
=== 2026 election ===
The election took place on 7 May 2026.

2026 Havering London Borough Council election: Rush Green and Crowlands (3)
Party	Candidate	Votes	%	±%
Reform	Alex Donald (Note: Councillor for Harold Wood from 2014 to 2018. Stood as a Residents Association candidate.)	1,347		
Reform	Henry William	1,293		
Reform	Petru Dinsorean	1,277		
Conservative	Viddy Persaud	1,103		
Conservative	Tim Ryan	1,057		
Conservative	Abul Hussain	1,038		
Labour	John Curtis	810		
Green	Kelly-Louise Edwards	750		
Labour	Joe Jervis	712		
Labour	Tom Pickford	697		
Green	Angelina Leatherbarrow	675		
Green	Beth Winslow	635		
Residents	Tracey Niemierko	269		
Residents	Robert O'Dea	237		
Residents	Garry Pain (Note: Councillor for Hylands from 2014 to 2018. Stood as a Conservative Party candidate.)	228		
Liberal Democrats	Agnius Bogdanovas	128		
Turnout			39.95	
Reform gain from Conservative		Swing		
Reform gain from Conservative		Swing		
Reform gain from Conservative		Swing		

=== 2022 election ===
The election took place on 5 May 2022.

2022 Havering London Borough Council election: Rush Green and Crowlands (3)
Party	Candidate	Votes	%	±%
Conservative	Robert Benham	1,561	47.4	
Conservative	Vidyotama Persaud	1,536	46.7	
Conservative	Timothy Ryan	1,472	44.7	
Labour	Angelina Leatherbarrow	1,276	38.8	
Labour	John Curtis	1,258	38.2	
Labour	Robert Ritchie	1,184	36.0	
Residents	Gemma Bevan	578	17.6	
Residents	Ajay Singh	482	14.6	
Residents	Tracey Niemierko	466	14.2	
Independent	Robert O`Dea	63	1.9	
Turnout			32.84%	
Majority		196	5.9	
Conservative win (new seat)				
Conservative win (new seat)				
Conservative win (new seat)				
