= Squirrels Heath (ward) =

Electoral ward in the London borough of Havering

- Electoral ward for the Havering London Borough Council
- Squirrels Heath ward boundaries since 2022
- Borough: Havering
- County: Greater London
- Population: 15,517 (2021) (Note: 2021 Census data reported for 2022 ward boundaries)
- Electorate: 11,623 (2022)
- Major settlements: Ardleigh Green and Gidea Park
- Area: 2.924 square kilometres (1.129 sq mi)

Current electoral ward
- Created: 2002
- Number of members: 3
- Councillors: Christine Vickery; Tom Vickery; Martynas Cekavicius
- GSS code: E05013985 (2022–present)

Squirrels Heath (from 2002 to 2022 Squirrel's Heath) is an electoral ward in the London Borough of Havering. The ward was first used in the 2002 elections. It returns councillors to Havering London Borough Council.

== List of councillors ==
Term	Councillor	Party
2002–2007	Edward Cahill	Conservative
2002–2014	Eric Munday	Conservative
2002–2026	Michael White	Conservative
2007–2014	Lynden Thorpe	Conservative
2014–2022	Melvin Wallace	Conservative
2014–2022	Damian White	Conservative
2022–present	Christine Vickery (Note: Christine Vickery changed parties in 2026.)	Conservative
2022–present	Christine Vickery	Reform
2022–2026	Keith Prince (Note: Keith Prince changed parties in 2025.)	Conservative
2022–2026	Keith Prince	Reform
2026-present	Tom Vickery	Reform
2026-present	Martynas Cekavicius	Reform

== Havering council elections since 2022 ==
There was a revision of ward boundaries in Havering in 2022.

=== 2026 election ===
The election took place on 7 May 2026.

2026 Havering London Borough Council election: Squirrels Heath (3)
Party	Candidate	Votes	%	±%
Reform	Christine Vickery	2,330	40.1	N/A
Reform	Tom Vickery	2,255	38.1	N/A
Reform	Martynas Cekavicius	2,159	37.1	N/A
Conservative	Adam Baker	1,432	24.6	−29.8
Conservative	Michael White	1,357	23.4	−29.8
Conservative	Spencer Seaton	1,306	22.5	−29.9
Green	Mark Whiley	851	14.6	N/A
Green	Madhu Devershetty	847	14.6	N/A
Green	Richard Killip	815	14.0	N/A
Residents	Paul Highman	620	10.7	−15.2
Residents	Jordan Beal	609	10.5	−11.4
Residents	Bob Perry	552	9.5	−11.0
Labour	Nadia Abid	550	9.5	−10.4
Labour	Alison Cummerson	509	8.8	−8.1
Labour	Antonia Osammor	432	7.4	−8.9
Liberal Democrats	Thomas Clarke	226	3.9	−1.5
Liberal Democrats	Shane Forster	166	2.9	−1.3
Turnout		5,581	49.78	+11.24
Reform gain from Conservative		Swing	N/A	
Reform gain from Conservative		Swing	N/A	
Reform gain from Conservative		Swing	N/A	

=== 2022 election ===
The election took place on 5 May 2022.

2022 Havering London Borough Council election: Squirrels Heath (3)
Party	Candidate	Votes	%	±%
Conservative	Christine Vickery	2,383	54.4	
Conservative	Keith Prince	2,331	53.2	
Conservative	Michael White	2,295	52.4	
Residents	Karen Bryan	1,124	25.7	
Residents	Robert Perry	967	22.1	
Residents	Colin Rushworth	897	20.5	
Labour	Mary Burke	871	19.9	
Labour	Nigel Meyer	741	16.9	
Labour	Christopher Purnell	714	16.3	
Independent	Melvin Wallace	237	5.4	
Liberal Democrats	Thomas Clarke	235	5.4	
Liberal Democrats	Caroline Hibbs-Brown	184	4.2	
Liberal Democrats	Christopher Stafford	161	3.7	
Turnout			38.54%	
Majority		1,171	26.7	
Conservative win (new boundaries)				
Conservative win (new boundaries)				
Conservative win (new boundaries)				

== 2002–2022 Havering council elections ==
Squirrel's Heath ward boundaries from 2002 to 2022

=== 2018 election ===
The election took place on 3 May 2018.

2018 Havering London Borough Council election: Squirrel's Heath (3)
Party	Candidate	Votes	%	±%
Conservative	Melvin Wallace	2,507	67.5	
Conservative	Michael White	2,409	64.9	
Conservative	Damian White	2,392	64.4	
Labour	Joseph MacVeigh	801	21.6	
Labour	Sophia Mousoulides	793	21.4	
Labour	John McCole	751	20.2	
Green	Victoria Wiseman	519	14.0	
Liberal Democrats	Madge Mulliner	337	9.1	
Turnout			35.27	
Majority		1,591		
Conservative hold		Swing		
Conservative hold		Swing		
Conservative hold		Swing		

=== 2014 election ===
The election took place on 22 May 2014.

2014 Havering London Borough Council election: Squirrels Heath (3)
Party	Candidate	Votes	%	±%
Conservative	Melvin Wallace	2,147		
Conservative	Damian White	2,057		
Conservative	Michael White	2,015		
UKIP	Eric Munday	1,299		
UKIP	Lynden Thorpe	1,291		
UKIP	Jacqueline Walsh	1,289		
Labour	Florence Brindley	603		
Labour	Joseph Macveigh	564		
Labour	Patrick Quinn	545		
Residents	Raymond Coomer	431		
Residents	Isabelle Alexander	401		
Residents	David Godwin	311		
Green	Michael Hughes	255		
Liberal Democrats	Madge Mulliner	103		
Turnout				
Conservative hold		Swing		
Conservative hold		Swing		
Conservative hold		Swing		

=== 2010 election ===
The election on 6 May 2010 took place on the same day as the United Kingdom general election.

2010 Havering London Borough Council election: Squirrels Heath (3)
Party	Candidate	Votes	%	±%
Conservative	Lynden Thorpe	4,081		
Conservative	Eric Munday	4,021		
Conservative	Michael White	3,699		
Labour	Anne-Marie Ducker	1,292		
Labour	Craig Bourne	1,241		
Residents	John Shrimpton	1,113		
Residents	Ann Webster	1,112		
Labour	Olanipe Fayokun	1,101		
Residents	Colin Maston	1,046		
Turnout				
Conservative hold		Swing		
Conservative hold		Swing		
Conservative hold		Swing		

=== 2007 by-election ===
The by-election took place on 23 August 2007, following the death of Edward Cahill.

2007 Squirrel's Heath by-election
Party	Candidate	Votes	%	±%
Conservative	Lynden Thorpe	1,828		
Residents	Denis Stevens	310		
Labour	Peter Mcinerney	210		
Liberal	Gregory Campbell	170		
UKIP	Terry Murray	134		
Turnout				
Conservative hold		Swing		

=== 2006 election ===
The election took place on 4 May 2006.

2006 Havering London Borough Council election: Squirrel's Heath (3)
Party	Candidate	Votes	%	±%
Conservative	Edward Cahill	2,614	64.5	
Conservative	Eric Munday	2,487		
Conservative	Michael White	2,423		
Residents	John Shrimpton	512	12.6	
Residents	Colin Maston	486		
Residents	Timothy Williams	474		
Labour	Eric Lovett	440	10.9	
Labour	Vineet Gupta	414		
Labour	Harry Webb	401		
UKIP	Robert Gracie	270	6.7	
Independent	Gregory Campbell	215	5.3	
Independent	Ann Kent	157		
Independent	Susan Francis	130		
Turnout			39.1	
Conservative hold		Swing		
Conservative hold		Swing		
Conservative hold		Swing		

=== 2002 election ===
The election took place on 2 May 2002.

2002 Havering London Borough Council election: Squirrel's Heath (3)
Party	Candidate	Votes	%	±%
Conservative	Edward Cahill	2,993		
Conservative	Eric Munday	2,965		
Conservative	Michael White	2,917		
Labour	David Harding	836		
Labour	Neil Brindley	817		
Labour	Stephen Jaques	803		
Liberal Democrats	Brian Taylor	593		
Liberal Democrats	Caroline Turner	584		
Liberal Democrats	Peter Spence	535		
Turnout				
Conservative win (new seat)				
Conservative win (new seat)				
Conservative win (new seat)				
