= National Liberal Party (UK, 1999) =

British far-right political party

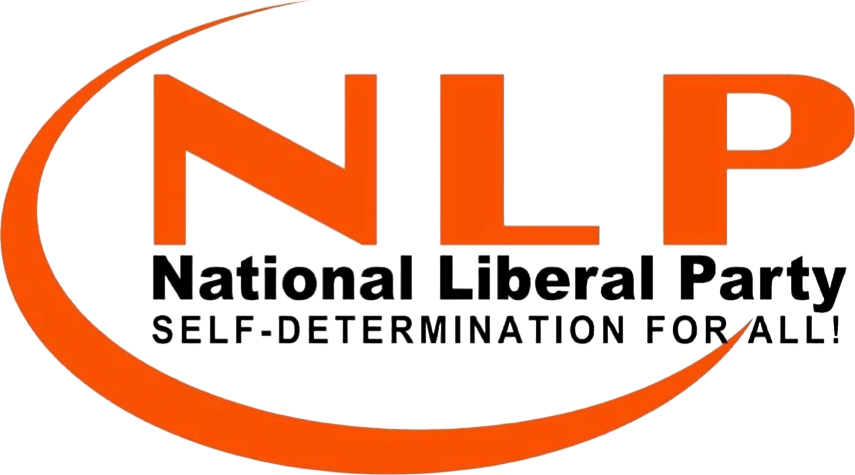
- Abbreviation: NLP
- Founders: Graham Williamson; Patrick Harrington
- Founded: March 1999
- Ideology: Euroscepticism; Right-wing antiglobalism
- Colours: Orange

Website
- http://nationalliberal.org/

The National Liberal Party is a far-right political party formed in the United Kingdom in 1999 with several former National Front activists as its most prominent members. Graham Williamson is listed as Nominating Officer and Upkar Singh Rai is listed as Leader and Treasurer. It has a number of ballot paper descriptions authorised by the Electoral Commission including: 'National Liberal Party – The Radical Centre' and 'National Liberal Party – Liberty, Independence, Democracy'. The group sporadically contested elections until emerging more prominently in the run-up to the 2014 European Parliament election, where it fielded eight candidates for the London constituency, but failed to meet the threshold of votes for its first list-candidate to be elected.

== Background ==
The National Liberal Party was founded by Graham Williamson and Patrick Harrington. It appeals for ethnic minority votes by focusing on national struggles abroad, with particular emphasis on injustices in Sri Lanka and India.

The party ran in the 2010 general election, contesting the Eastleigh seat. Its candidate, Keith Lowe, ran a campaign criticising the sitting MP Chris Huhne for his failure to support a referendum for the public to ratify the Treaty of Lisbon. During the election, the presence of several former National Front (NF) members in prominent positions was raised in the local press, although the general secretary, David Durant – himself a former NF member – said that the party belonged to the "patriotic centre".

Despite the far-right and fascist backgrounds of its leaders, the party fielded eight candidates for the 2014 European Parliament election in London, on a multicultural election list including Tamil, Sikh and Kurdish candidates. The party manifesto gave no indication of its far-right origins. It said, "The National Liberal Party is putting forward a team of 8 ethnically and racially diverse candidates – Tamil, Sikh, Azerbaijan, Kurdish, English, north Borneo (Sabah-Sarawak), to represent the real grassroots London." One of the group's candidates, Yussuf Anwar, appeared on BBC's Daily Politics and declared himself proud of Graham Williamson, arguing that his NF membership was a youthful mistake.

== Criticism from the extreme right ==
Following revelations about the party's origins by Channel 4, the NLP was pilloried in Heritage and Destiny, a longstanding periodical closely linked to several groups including the nationalist, frequently neo-fascist and anti-Semitic International Third Position. The article focused on the party's website which named its political progenitors as the Earl of Rosebery, Joseph Chamberlain and Leslie Hore-Belisha and criticised the establishment Jewish links of all except Chamberlain as well as the perceived lack of ideological connection between the three and even the poor spelling of their names.

== Elections contested ==
=== Parliamentary elections ===
General election, 6 May 2010

Constituency	Candidate	Votes	%
Eastleigh	Keith Low	93	0.2

General election, 7 May 2015

Constituency	Candidate	Votes	%
Ealing, Southall	Jagdeesh Singh	461	1.1
Ruislip, Northwood & Pinner	Sockalingam Yogalingam	166	0.3

=== European Parliament elections ===
2014 European elections

Regional lists	Candidates	Votes	%	MEPs
London	Graham Williamson; Jagdeesh Singh; Sockalingam Yogalingam; Doris Jones; Upkar Singh Rai; Yussef Anwar; Araz Yurdseven; Bernard Dube	6,736	0.3	0

=== London Assembly elections ===
2021 London Assembly election

List	Candidates	Votes	%	AMs
London-wide list	Upkar Rai; Arunasalam Rajalingam; Faisal Maramazi; Araz Yurdseven; Ponniah Yogaraja	2,860	0.1	0
