= Romford =

Town in Greater London, England

Coordinates: 51.5768°N 0.1801°E

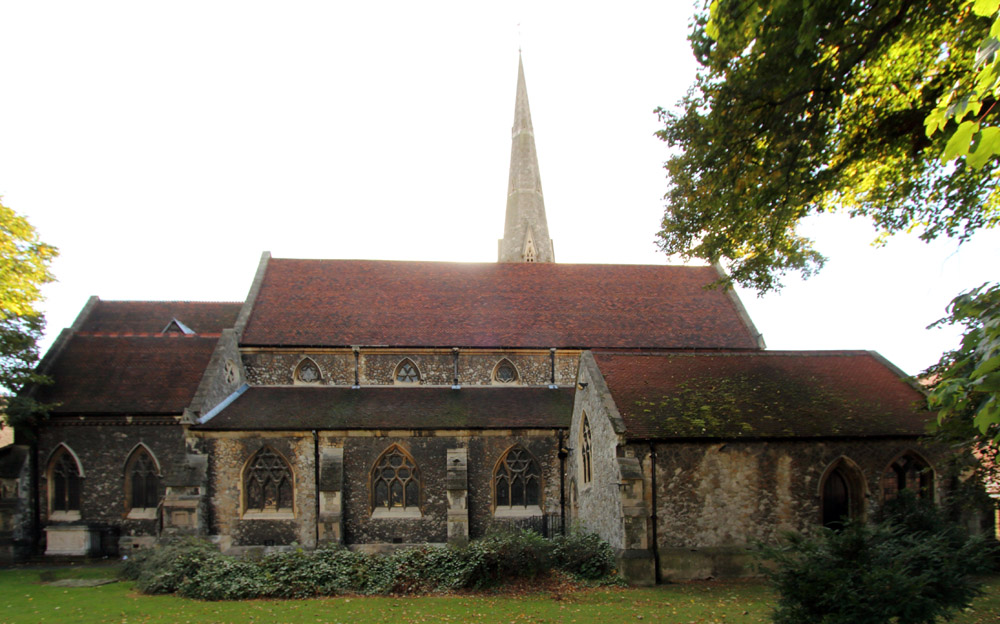
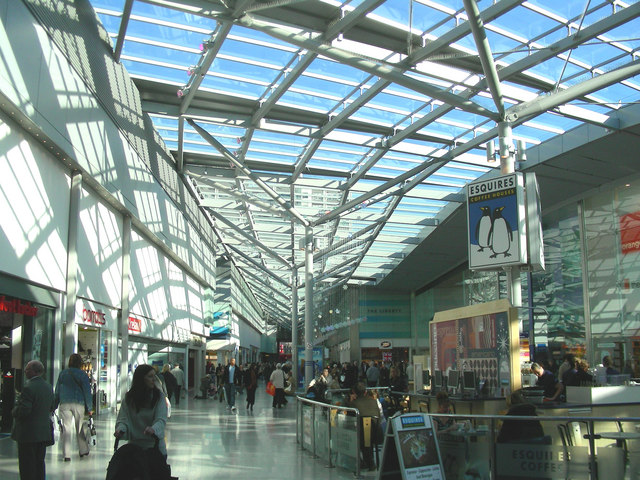
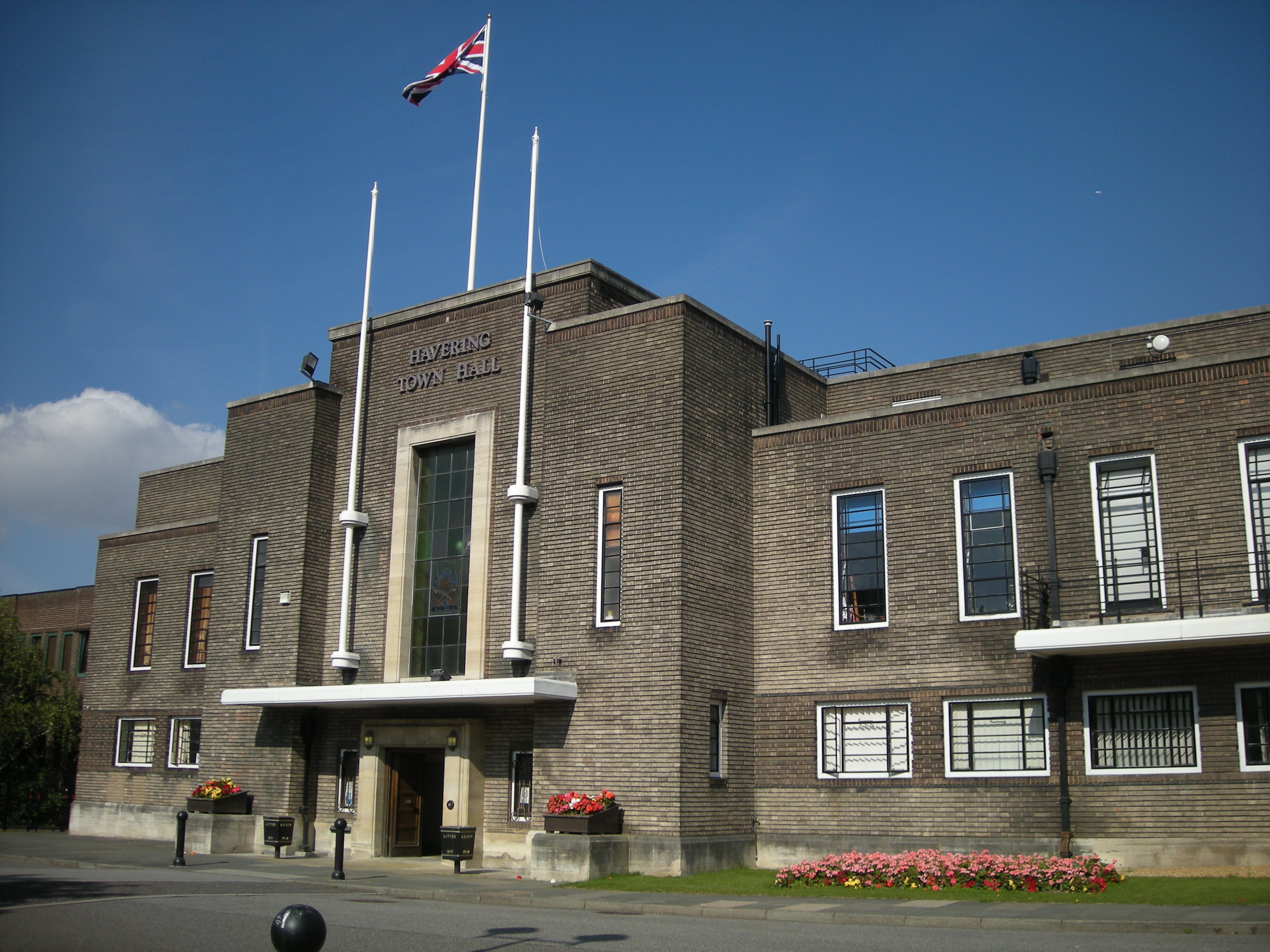
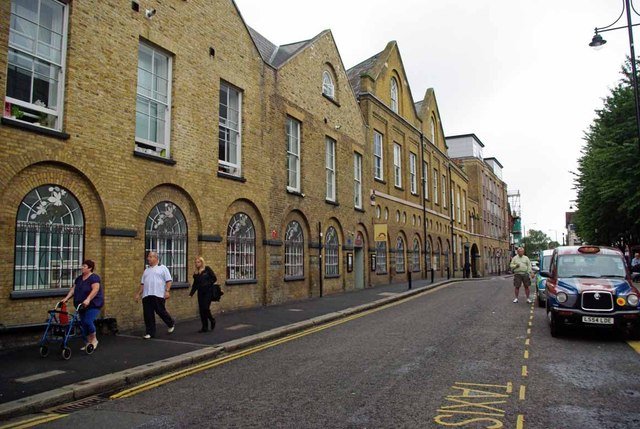
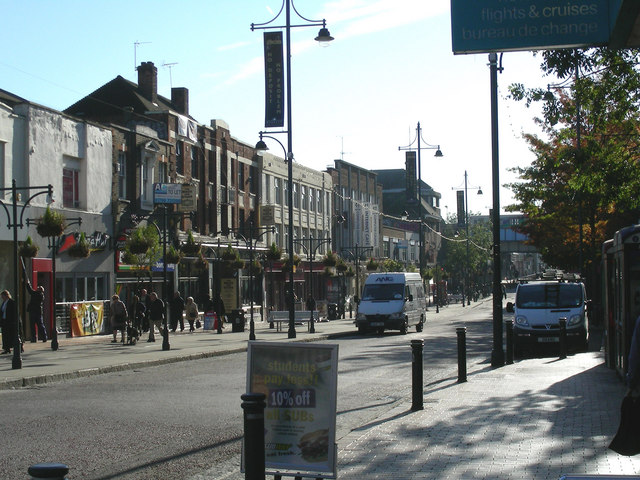
- Clockwise from top: Church of St Edward the Confessor; Havering Town Hall; South Street; Havering Museum (former Ind Coope brewery); The Liberty Shopping Centre

- Location within Greater London
- OS grid reference: TQ510887
  - Charing Cross: 14.1 mi (22.7 km) SW
- London borough: Havering
- Ceremonial county: Greater London
- Region: London
- Country: England
- Sovereign state: United Kingdom
- Post town: ROMFORD
- Postcode district: RM1-RM7
- Dialling code: 01708
- Police: Metropolitan
- Fire: London
- Ambulance: London
- UK Parliament: Romford
- London Assembly: Havering and Redbridge

Romford is a large town in east London, England, located 14 mi (23 km) northeast of Charing Cross. Part of the London Borough of Havering, the town is one of the major metropolitan centres of Greater London identified in the London Plan.

Historically part of the ancient parish of Hornchurch in the Becontree hundred of Essex, Romford has been a market town since 1247. It formed the administrative centre of the liberty of Havering until that liberty was dissolved in 1892, and became a civil parish of its own in 1849. Good road links to London and the opening of the railway station in 1839 were key to the development of the town. The economic history of Romford is characterised by a shift from agriculture to light industry and then to retail and commerce.

As part of the suburban growth of London throughout the 20th century, Romford significantly expanded and increased in population, becoming a municipal borough in 1937. In 1965, following reform of local government in London, it merged with the Hornchurch Urban District to form the London Borough of Havering, and was incorporated into Greater London. Today, it is one of the largest commercial, retail, entertainment and leisure districts in London and has a well-developed night-time economy.

== History ==
Romford (parish) population
1881	9,050
1891	10,722
1901	13,656
1911	16,970
1921	19,442
1931	35,918
1941	war (Note: No census was held due to World War II)
1951	76,580
1961	114,584
source: UK census

=== Toponymy ===
Romford is first recorded in 1177 as Romfort, which is formed from Old English 'rūm' and 'ford' and means "the wide or spacious ford". The naming of the River Rom is a local 'back-formation' from the name of the town; and the river is elsewhere known as the Beam. The ford most likely existed on the main London to Colchester road where it crossed that river.

=== Economic development ===
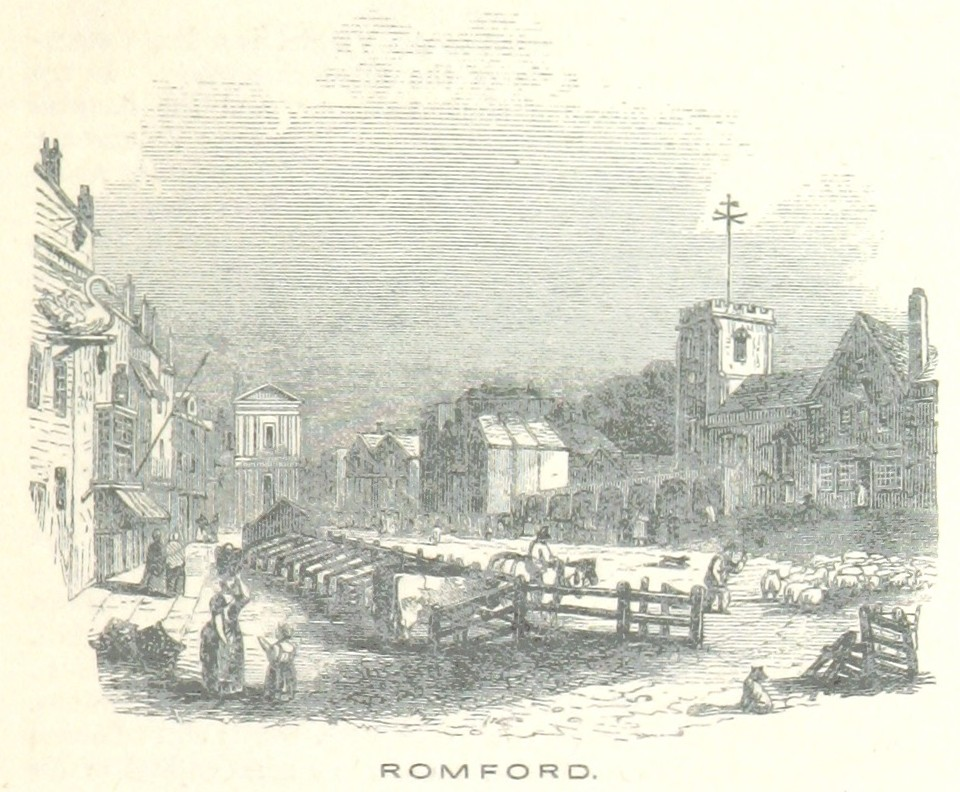
Market Place with the Havering Liberty court house in the background in 1851

The town developed in the Middle Ages on the main road to London and the regionally significant Romford Market was established in 1247. The original site of the town was to the south, in an area known as Oldchurch. It was moved northwards to the present site in the later medieval period to avoid the frequent flooding of the River Rom. The first permanent church on the site of the current Church of St Edward the Confessor was built after permission was granted by Henry IV in 1406. The early history of Romford and the immediate area is agricultural and it is recorded as being the location of a number of mills used to grind corn. The area was a focus of the leather industry from the 15th to the early 19th centuries and there is record of a wide range of industries such as cloth making, weaving, charcoal burning, metal working and brewing. Communications played an important part in its development; the main road to London was maintained by the Middlesex and Essex Turnpike Trust from 1721 and Romford became a coaching town in the 18th century.

Several failed attempts were made in the early 19th century to connect the town to the Thames via a Romford Canal. It was initially intended to terminate at a basin near to the Star Brewery, to transport agricultural products to London and, eventually, to serve growing industrial sites in Romford. A later proposal included an extension to Collier Row, whereby timber from Hainault Forest could be transported to the Thames for use in the Royal Dockyards. Only two miles of canal were constructed and the canal company were unable to reach the town.

The development of the town was accelerated by the opening of the railway station in 1839 which stimulated the local economy and was key to the development of the Star Brewery. Initially Eastern Counties Railway services operated between Mile End and Romford, with extensions to Brentwood and to Shoreditch in 1840. A second station was opened on South Street in 1892 by the London, Tilbury and Southend Railway on the line to Upminster and Grays, giving Romford a rail connection to Tilbury Docks. The two stations were combined into one in 1934. Light industry slowly developed, reaching a peak in the 1970s with a number of factories on the edge of town, such as the Roneo Vickers office machinery company, Colvern manufacturers of wireless components, May's Sheet Metal Works and brush manufacturers Betterware. Suburban expansion increased the population and reinforced Romford's position as a significant regional town centre. The Liberty Shopping Centre was constructed in the 1960s, and has been modernised and supplemented with further shopping centres throughout the town, including The Mercury Mall, opened in 1990; (Note: The Mercury Mall was opened as Liberty 2) and The Brewery, opened in 2000 on the site of the old Star Brewery.

=== Local government ===
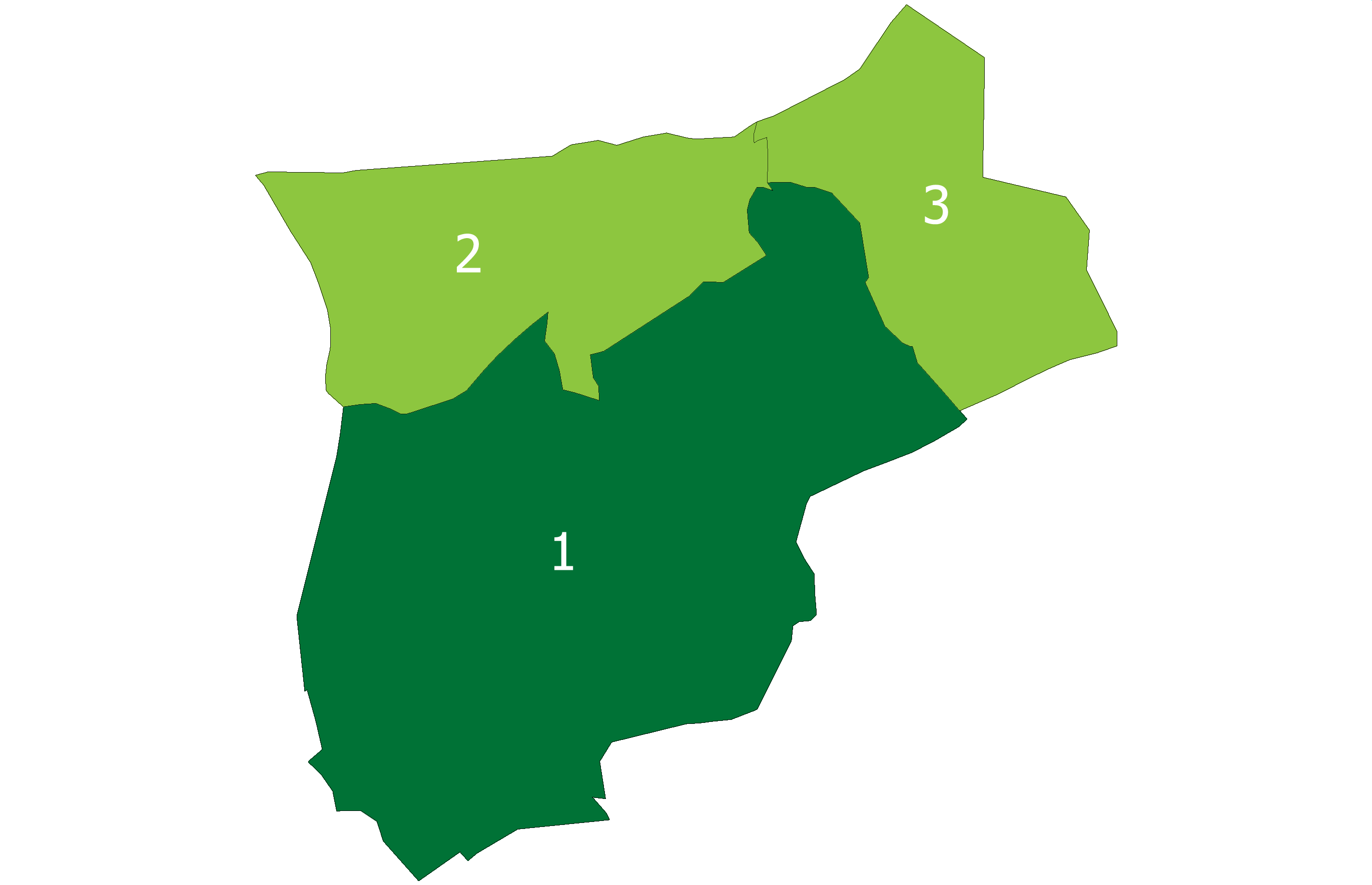
Romford Urban District (1) absorbed Havering-atte-Bower (2) and Noak Hill (3) in 1934

Romford formed a chapelry in the large ancient parish of Hornchurch in the Becontree hundred of Essex; as well as the town it included the wards of Collier Row, Harold Wood, and Noak Hill. Through ancient custom the area enjoyed special status and a charter in 1465 removed the parish from the Becontree hundred and the county of Essex and it instead formed the independent liberty of Havering governed from a court house in the market place. Over time the vestry of Romford chapelry absorbed the local powers that would usually be held by the parish authorities in Hornchurch and in 1849 Romford became a separate parish within the liberty. Improvement commissioners were set up in 1819 for paving, lighting, watching, and cleansing of the marketplace and main streets. As the town grew this arrangement became ineffective at controlling sanitation and in 1851 a local board of health was set up for the parish; although its area was reduced in 1855 to cover only the town ward. The remainder of the parish became part of the Romford rural sanitary district in 1875. These changes and the introduction of the Romford Poor Law Union in 1836 eroded the powers of the liberty and it was finally abolished in 1892 and reincorporated into Essex.

The Local Government Act 1894 reformed local government and created the Romford Urban District and Romford Rural District to replace the local board and sanitary district; following which the Romford parish was split into Romford Urban and Romford Rural along the lines of the urban district. In 1900 the parish was recombined and the urban district expanded to cover all of the former area of the historic chapelry, except for Noak Hill which remained in the rural district and had become a parish in its own right in 1895. The enlarged urban district formed part of the London Traffic Area from 1924 and the London Passenger Transport Area from 1933. The suburban expansion of London caused an increase in population during the 1930s and the urban district was expanded further in 1934, taking in the parishes of Havering-atte-Bower and Noak Hill. It was incorporated as the Municipal Borough of Romford in 1937. In 1965 the municipal borough was abolished and its former area was combined with that of Hornchurch Urban District; it was again removed from Essex and since then has formed the northern part of the London Borough of Havering in Greater London. For elections to the Greater London Council, Romford was part of the Havering electoral division until 1973 and then the Romford electoral division until 1986.

=== Suburban expansion ===
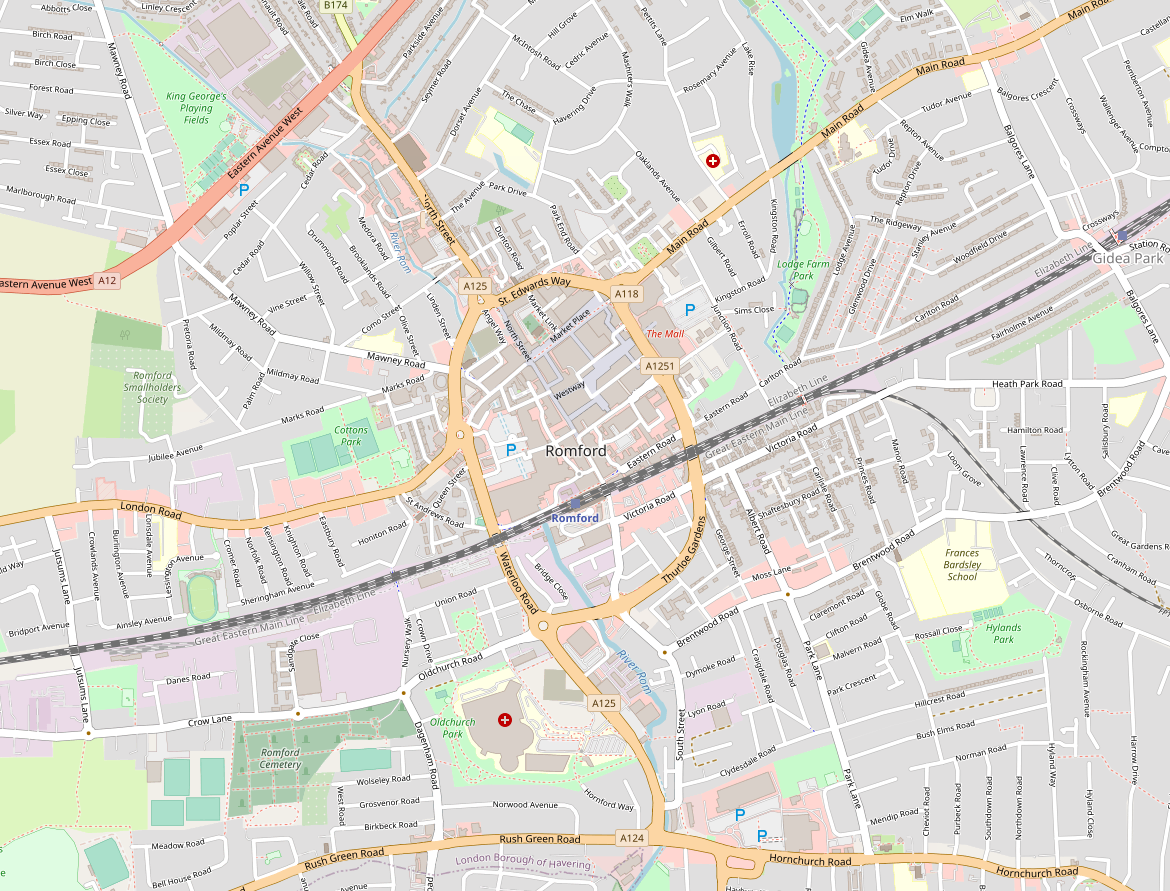
Map of Romford and surrounding area

There was early expansion of 200 cottages in the 1840s in an area known as New Romford that was formerly occupied by an army barracks. To the east of the market place from 1850 middle class suburban housing was constructed with a much larger area of 200 acres (80 hectares) built-over to the south of the railway from 1851 and by 1861 the population had grown to 3790. Through a gradual process of selling off former manors, houses were built radiating from the town in all directions for about a mile, and further significant growth occurred between 1910 and 1911 with the construction of Romford Garden Suburb, which included Raphael Park and Gidea Park railway station. Large sections of land to the north of the town at Collier Row were developed in the interwar period and after World War II, the London County Council built the Harold Hill estate to the north east from 1948 to 1958. The Barrack Ground estate was redeveloped in the early 1960s and the name Waterloo Road estate was applied.

The right to supply electricity to the town was secured by the County of London Electricity Supply Company in 1913. Initially power was generated within the Star Brewery site, with the supply switching to Barking Power Station in 1925. Gas supply began in 1825 with gas works of 25 acres (10 ha) constructed by 1938. Following the Telegraph Act 1899 Romford became part of the Post Office London telephone area and the Romford exchange was recorded as having 240 subscribers in 1916. The town water supply initially came from the Havering Well, and 1859 a new public well and pump was built at the east end of the market. The South Essex Waterworks Company started installing mains water supply in 1863 and had offices in South Street. By 1905 its supply was serving Ilford, Collier Row, Ardleigh Green, Brentwood, and Hornchurch. Sewage works were installed by the local board at Oldchurch in 1862, with further works built in Hornchurch in 1869. Romford Cemetery was established in 1871.

== Governance ==
Romford constituency in Greater London since 2024

As of 2024, the Romford UK Parliament constituency consists of the Havering wards of Havering-atte-Bower, Hylands and Harrow Lodge, Marshalls and Rise Park, Mawneys, Rush Green and Crowlands, St Alban's, St Edward's and Squirrels Heath. The MP since 2001 is Andrew Rosindell of Reform UK, a native of the town.

Since the 2022 election, each ward elects two or three councillors to Havering London Borough Council. Romford forms part of the Havering and Redbridge constituency for elections to the London Assembly.

== Geography ==
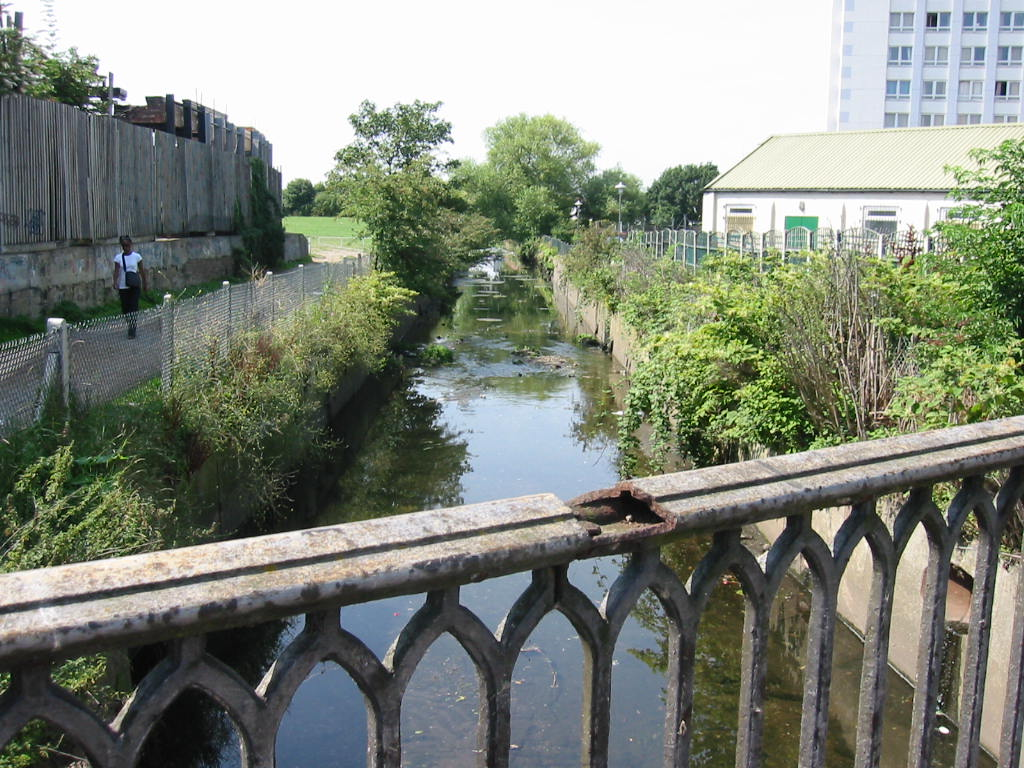
The River Rom emerges from underground channels at Roneo Corner.

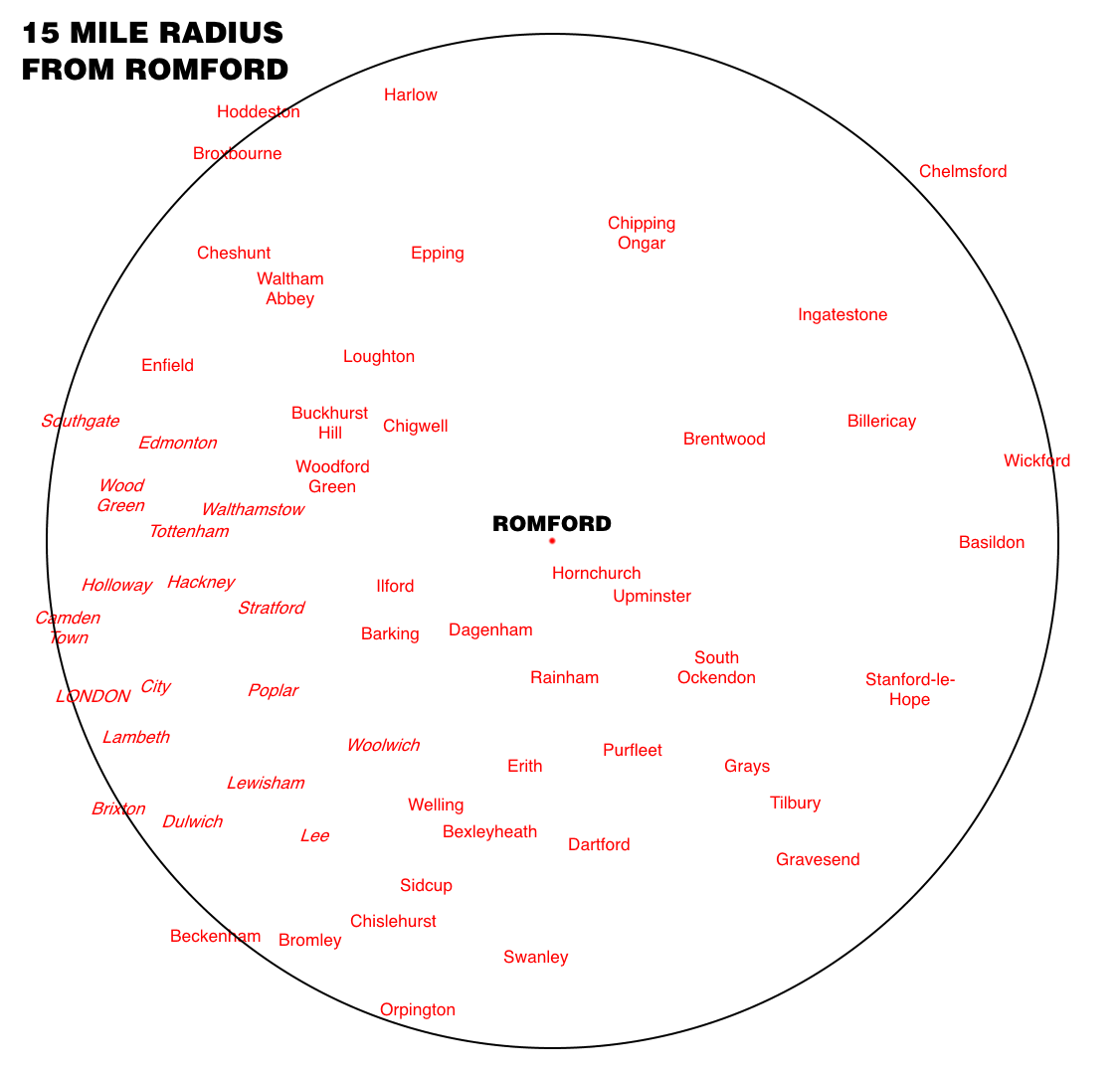
15 mile radius map for Romford

The town centre is about 50 feet (15 m) above sea level on a gravel terrace rising from the River Thames. The north of the town has developed on London Clay and is situated as much as 150 ft (46 m) above sea level. A continuous gentle rise in the eastern suburbs towards Gidea Park and Harold Wood peaks around 177 feet (54 m) around the Harold Court. On the northern side, Harold Hill peaks at 75 m (246 ft). The semi-rural area north of Collier Row and Harold Hill consists of many rolls of hills, with elevation peaking at the village of Havering-atte-Bower, 344 feet (105 m). The town centre is for the most part contained within a ring road formed of St Edwards Way, Mercury Gardens, Thurloe Gardens, Oldchurch Road and Waterloo Road. The market place and much of South Street and the High Street are pedestrianised. The railway cuts through the town from east to west on a viaduct, with the bulk of the central Romford area to its north. The River Rom flows through the town in underground channels and joins the Thames after flowing through Hornchurch; elsewhere along its course it is known as the River Beam and forms part of the strategic waterways Blue Ribbon Network.

Romford has formed part of the continuously built-up area of London since the 1930s and is contiguous with Rush Green to the west, Collier Row to the north, Gidea Park to the east and Hornchurch to the southeast.

The Romford post town covers Chadwell Heath, Collier Row, Gidea Park, Harold Hill, Harold Park, Harold Wood, Havering-atte-Bower, Rise Park and Rush Green, extending into sections of the London Borough of Barking and Dagenham, the London Borough of Redbridge and Epping Forest District. The Romford postcode area extends further.

Romford is located 14 mi (23 km) northeast of Charing Cross in central London; 4 3/4 mi (7.5 km) northeast of Ilford; 2 1/2 mi (4 km) north of Dagenham; 9 mi (14 km) northwest of Grays; 6 mi (10 km) south-west of Brentwood; 12 mi (19 km) west of Basildon; and 9 mi (14 km) southeast of Epping.

=== Climate ===
Climate data for Romford is taken from the nearest weather station at Greenwich, around 10 miles (16 km) southwest of the marketplace.

Climate data for Greenwich Park, elevation: 47 m (154 ft), 1991–2020 normals, extremes 1948–2004
Month	Jan	Feb	Mar	Apr	May	Jun	Jul	Aug	Sep	Oct	Nov	Dec	Year
Record high °C (°F)	16.8 (62.2)	19.7 (67.5)	23.3 (73.9)	25.3 (77.5)	29.0 (84.2)	34.5 (94.1)	35.3 (95.5)	37.5 (99.5)	30.2 (86.4)	26.1 (79.0)	18.9 (66.0)	16.4 (61.5)	37.5 (99.5)
Mean daily maximum °C (°F)	8.5 (47.3)	9.2 (48.6)	12.1 (53.8)	15.4 (59.7)	18.6 (65.5)	21.4 (70.5)	23.8 (74.8)	23.3 (73.9)	20.3 (68.5)	15.8 (60.4)	11.6 (52.9)	8.9 (48.0)	15.8 (60.4)
Daily mean °C (°F)	5.9 (42.6)	6.2 (43.2)	8.4 (47.1)	10.7 (51.3)	13.8 (56.8)	16.7 (62.1)	18.8 (65.8)	18.7 (65.7)	15.9 (60.6)	12.4 (54.3)	8.8 (47.8)	6.3 (43.3)	11.9 (53.4)
Mean daily minimum °C (°F)	3.4 (38.1)	3.2 (37.8)	4.7 (40.5)	6.0 (42.8)	9.1 (48.4)	12.0 (53.6)	13.9 (57.0)	14.1 (57.4)	11.6 (52.9)	9.0 (48.2)	6.1 (43.0)	3.8 (38.8)	8.1 (46.6)
Record low °C (°F)	−12.7 (9.1)	−9.4 (15.1)	−6.7 (19.9)	−4.8 (23.4)	−1.0 (30.2)	1.1 (34.0)	5.0 (41.0)	5.3 (41.5)	1.1 (34.0)	−2.1 (28.2)	−8.0 (17.6)	−10.5 (13.1)	−12.7 (9.1)
Average precipitation mm (inches)	43.9 (1.73)	39.9 (1.57)	36.5 (1.44)	38.6 (1.52)	44.0 (1.73)	49.3 (1.94)	36.3 (1.43)	53.0 (2.09)	52.4 (2.06)	58.3 (2.30)	59.9 (2.36)	50.7 (2.00)	562.9 (22.16)
Average precipitation days (≥ 1.0 mm)	10.5	9.2	7.9	8.1	7.9	7.8	7.1	8.2	7.9	10.3	10.6	10.2	105.6
Mean monthly sunshine hours	44.4	66.1	109.7	152.9	198.7	198.6	209.2	198.0	140.6	99.7	58.5	50.1	1,526.4
Source 1: Met Office
Source 2: Starlings Roost Weather

== Demography ==
The population of the Romford parliamentary constituency was 109,400 in 2022. The population of the London Borough of Havering was 264,700. In 2021 there were 41,800 households in Romford constituency and 101,300 in the borough of Havering. In 2021 12.8% in Romford constituency (10.7% in Havering) were Asian, Asian British or Asian Welsh; 8.1% (8.2%) were Black, Black British, Black Welsh, Caribbean or African; 4.1% (3.7%) were Mixed or Multiple ethnic groups; 72.4% (75.3%) were White; and 2.5% (2.0%) were Other ethnic group. In 2021, 29.2% in Romford constituency (30.6% in Havering) report No religion; 51.1% (52.2%) were Christian; 0.4% (0.4%) Buddhist; 2.9% (2.5%) Hindu; 0.7% (0.5%) Jewish; 7.5% (6.2%) Muslim; 2.0% (1.7%) Sikh; 0.4% (0.4%) Other religion; and 5.7% (5.5%) Not answered.

== Economy ==
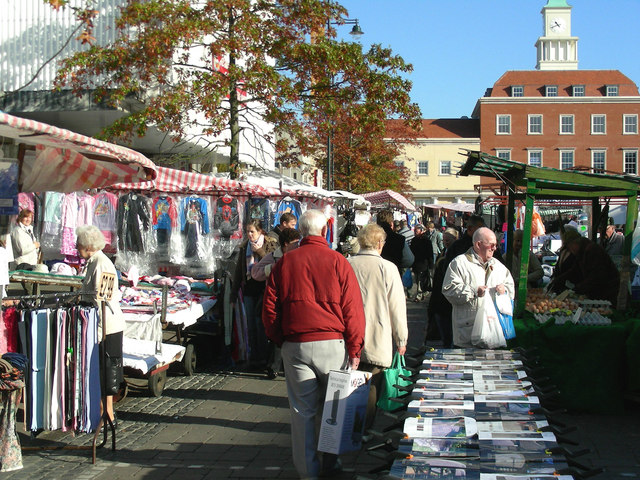
The market place

Romford is recognised in the London Plan as one of 14 regionally significant metropolitan centres in Greater London, with a considerable catchment area. The town has significant retail, office, leisure and cultural floorspace. There is a developed night-time economy, greater than in any other metropolitan centre in Greater London, with 8,360 m^{2} (90,000 sq ft) of cinemas, theatres and concert hall space; 9,530 m^{2} (102,600 sq ft) of bars and pubs; 5,510 m^{2} (59,300 sq ft) of cafés and restaurants; and 2,680 m^{2} (28,800 sq ft) of fast food and take away venues. The night-time economy is almost as significant as the day economy with around 12,000 visits to Romford during the day and 11,000 visits to pubs, clubs and bars at night. The night-time economy of clubs, pubs and bars has been growing since 2023. Romford Market has been in a long period of decline with 60 regular traders in 2020, down from a peak of over 300.

== Transport ==
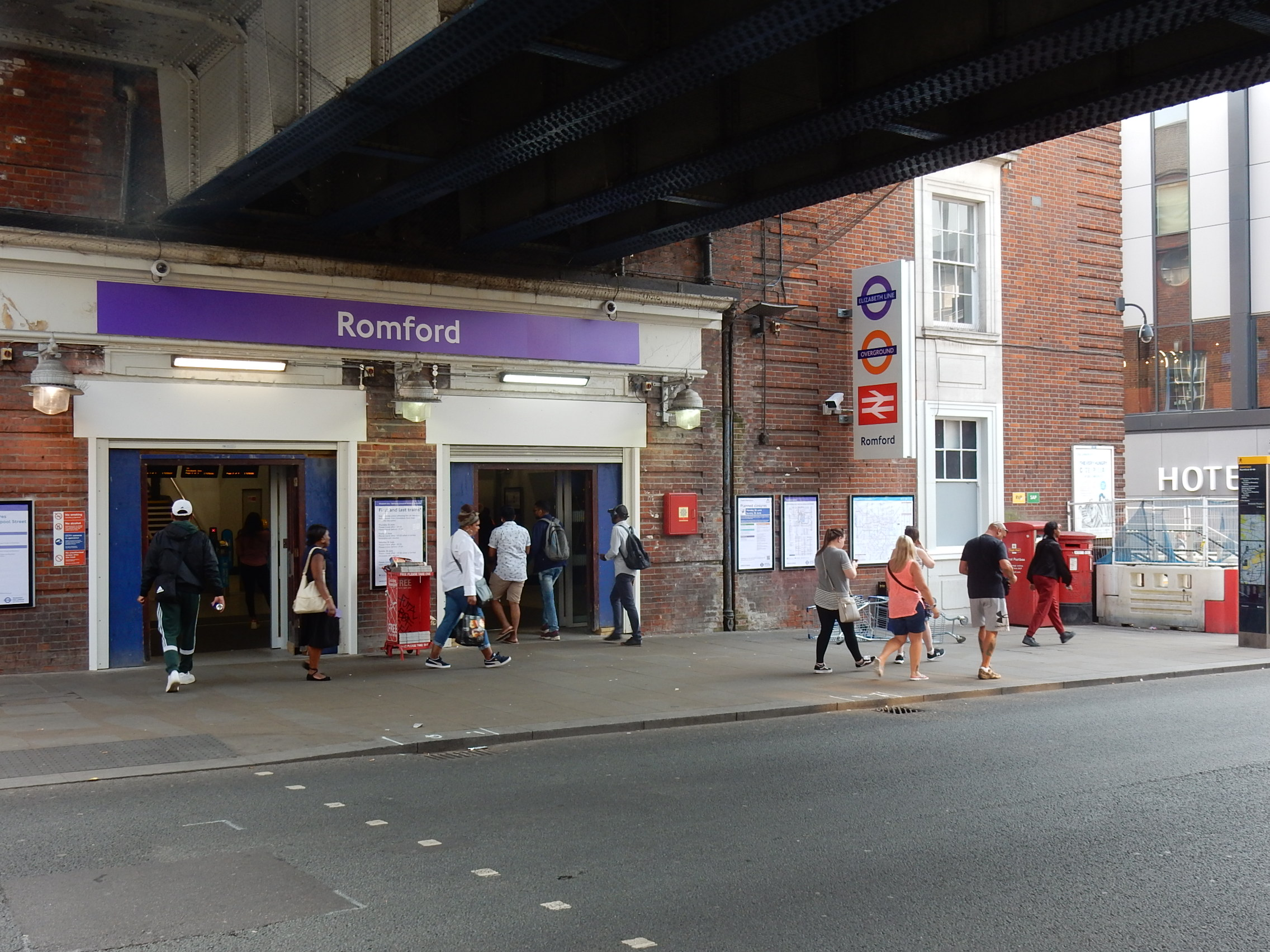
Romford railway station

Romford town centre has a very high Public Transport Accessibility Level score of 6.

The town is served by Romford railway station, in London fare zone 6. The station is a stop on the Great Eastern Main Line. It is served by Elizabeth line trains between Shenfield and Paddington, with some services extended to Heathrow Airport. Romford is the western terminus of the Liberty line service of the London Overground, which connects the town to Upminster. Since May 2025, there is a regular off-peak Greater Anglia service between Southend Victoria and Liverpool Street calling at the station.

Romford is a hub of the London Buses network, with services to Canning Town, Stratford, Leytonstone and Dagenham; there are also feeder services from the large housing developments at Collier Row and Harold Hill. There are night bus services to Beam Park, Claybury Broadway, Havering Park, Leytonstone, Stratford, Harold Hill and Oxford Circus.

The A12 trunk road passes to the north of Romford, while the A118 road from Stratford connects with it at Gallows Corner at the start of the A127 road to Southend.

== Culture ==
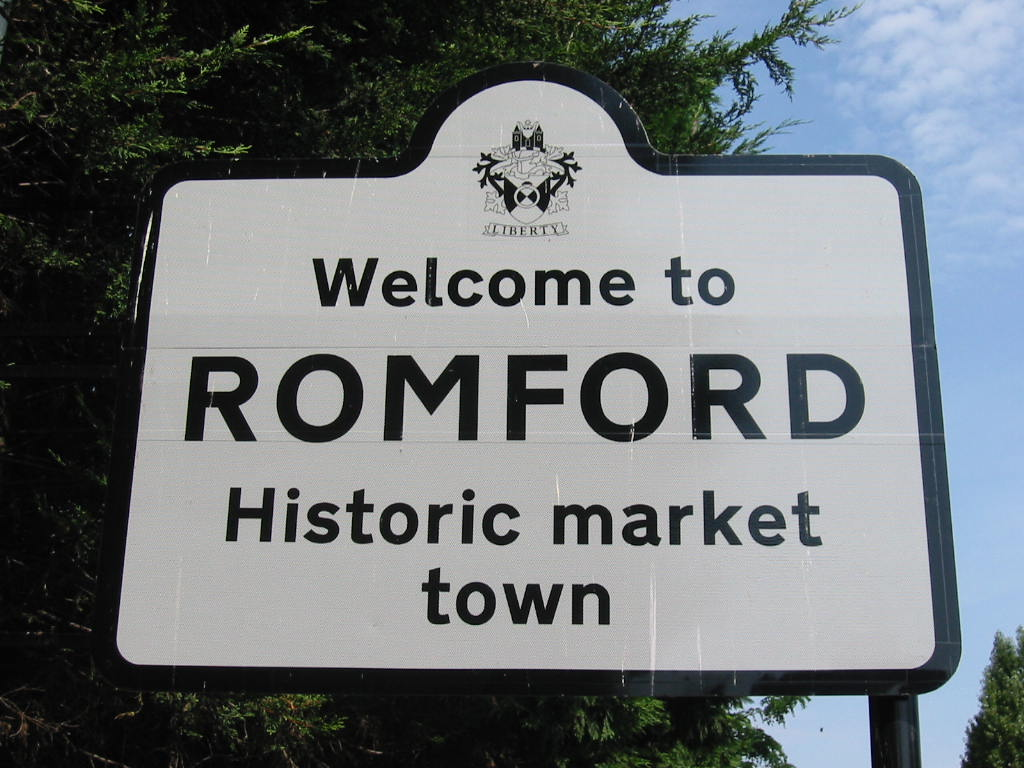
Welcome sign at Roneo Corner with the coat of arms and motto of Havering London Borough Council

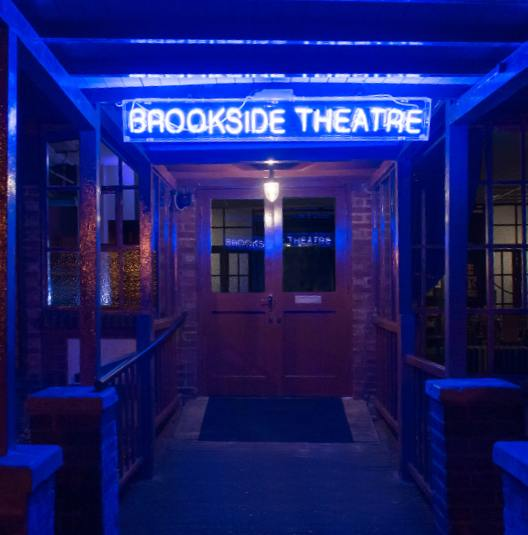
Brookside Theatre entrance

In 2005, Havering Council's urban strategy had the stated aims of making Romford a cultural destination, whilst recognising that Hornchurch forms the main cultural hub of the borough with a large theatre and arts spaces. As a former market and coaching town, Romford is well served by public houses and two that are located in the market place are listed buildings. The market and adjacent streets also form a conservation area.

Mass entertainment facilities in the town include the Brookside Theatre, Romford Greyhound Stadium (the last remaining dog racing track in London), and two multi-screen cinemas. The town is strongly associated with the electronic music group Underworld, who cite Romford in their hit "Born Slippy", affiliated to the movie Trainspotting.

Ride the sainted rhythms on the midnight train to Romford

— Dirty Epic on dubnobasswithmyheadman, Underworld (1994)

Romford's position as a focus for electronic music production was reinforced by the presence of the Strictly Underground and Suburban Base record labels, with Suburban Base developing from the Boogie Times record store. According to a Billboard article in 1992, Romford-produced dance music formed part of a trend favouring suburban and provincial "bedroom" record labels over those in central London. In 2013, the film Death Walks was filmed in Romford over a four-month period. The cult TV series Garth Marenghi's Darkplace was set in the fictional Darkplace Hospital, in Romford.

Romford appears as the fictional Romton in George Orwell's "Down and Out in Paris and London". George Orwell bibliography

The local newspaper for the town and the borough of Havering is the Romford Recorder, with an average circulation per issue of 8,852 in 2024.

Bedrock Radio is a local community radio station, based at Queen's Hospital Romford. The station is available online and is due to launch on DAB+ serving East London in late 2025. Time 107.5 was a local radio station based in the Liberty Shopping Centre, The 107.5 FM frequency was sold to Nation Broadcasting and now broadcasts as Nation Radio London.

Lumiere Cinema, located within the Mercury Mall, has served as the venue for the Romford Film Festival since 2017, the Romford Horror Film Festival since 2020, and the East London LGBTQ+ Film Festival since 2023.

In April 2023, hoodies were banned from the town centre along with Ski masks and motorcycle helmets in an initiative by Romford Business Improvement District, backed by Havering councillors and local Metropolitan Police officers, as a measure against antisocial behaviour.

== Sports ==
Romford F.C., who currently play in the Essex Senior League, is the local football team. The Raiders IHC ice hockey team is based in Romford, at Romford Ice Arena until 2013 and now Sapphire Ice and Leisure. Sapphire Ice also replaced the Dolphin Centre, which was a popular swimming and leisure facility from 1982 to 1995. Romford and Gidea Park Rugby Football Club is based at Crowlands in Romford. Romford Bowls Club is based in Lodge Farm Park.

== See also ==
- List of people from the London Borough of Havering
- List of schools in the London Borough of Havering
