= East London LGBTQ+ Film Festival =

LGBTQ film festival in England

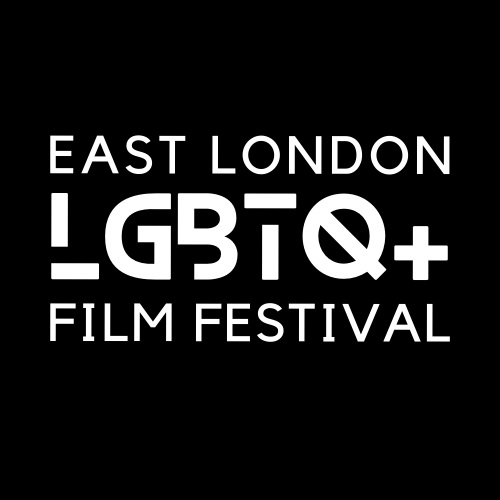
- Location: Romford, London, England
- Founded: 2023; 3 years ago
- Founded by: Carrie Kendall
- Most recent: Nov 4, 2023
- Awards: 5
- Language: English
- Website: Official Website

East London LGBTQ+ Film Festival is an independent film festival founded in 2023 by festival director Carrie Kendall in partnership with Kaleidoscope. The festival is designated to showing independent and studio cinema made for and by members of the LGBTQIA+ community, encouraging and inspiring the youth community in the local area, raising important funds and awareness for the charitable organisation Kaleidoscope. The festival takes place annually in Romford, United Kingdom and is hosted at Premiere Cinemas inside The Mercury Mall.

The festival celebrates the showcasing of the best LGBTQIA+ independent British and International films. The festival provides a platform for established and emerging filmmakers in showcasing their work, discover new talent, and network with industry professionals. The festival also bring a variety of talks and stalls as well as giving the audience opportunities to engage with those filmmakers through live Q&A's. The festival includes screenings from first-time filmmakers to some of the most established names on the independent film circuit with features, short films and music videos. The festival recognises the achievements of filmmakers through awards in multiple categories.

== History ==
In 2023, it was announced that Carrie Kendall in partnership with Kaleidoscope was developing the festival and began taking submissions prior to the event. The festival was supported by The Mayor of London's community fund. The fund was used to increase positive and accurate representation of LGBTQ+ people on screen and celebrating the local LGBTQ+ community. The event was to be one day event showing films all day for £15. As part of the event Kinky Boots would be screened. The festival award categories for the first festival was; Best Feature Film. Best Short Film. Best Documentary. Best Performance. Best Music Video. Kendall, festival director, referenced how important films are to the LGBTQIA+ Community, "Cinema has played a pivotal role for acceptance of the LGBTQ+ community. It normalises and demystifies same-sex relationships, it's also just nice to see someone like yourself on the big screen." The first event took place at Premiere Cinemas inside The Mercury Mall on 4 November 2023, the funds raised helps support young LGBTQIA+ people in Havering. Special guests David McGillivray and Sarah Jane Potts attended the festival. McGillivray was presented with a lifetime achievement award. Potts virtually introduced Kinky Boots, followed by an award ceremony for the best films, selected by the audience.

In 2024, the 2nd festival will be held 9–10 November 2024.

== Awards ==
The East London LGBTQ+ Film Festival recognises the achievements of filmmakers in the following awards.

The East London LGBTQ+ Film Festival recognises the achievements of filmmakers in the following awards.

- Best Feature Film
- Best Short Film
- Best Music Video
- Best Documentary
- Best Performance
- Best Student Film
- Best Animated Film
- Lifetime Achievement

Key
| Award Nomination |
| Award winner |

2023 Season Nominations & Award Winners
| Award | Nominee / Award Winner |
|---|---|
| Best Feature Film | Absent Bodies |
| Best Feature Film | Piecht |
| Best Feature Film | RE:GEN(D)ERATION |
| Best Short Film | Flowers |
| Best Short Film | Friday Night Shidduch |
| Best Short Film | Making Up |
| Best Music Video | Bold |
| Best Music Video | Hold You Down |
| Best Music Video | Love Is Hell |
| Best Documentary | Call Me Miles |
| Best Documentary | Stonewall Postal Action Network |
| Best Performance | Jessica Ellery (Making Up) |
| Best Performance | Keith Qdidika (Black Queer Futures) |
| Best Performance | Rocco Roberts (Flowers) |
| Best Performance | Thorne Brown (RE:GEN(D)ERATION) |
| Lifetime Achievement | David McGillivray |

2024 Season Nominations & Award Winners
| Award | Nominee / Award Finalist |
|---|---|
| Best Feature Film | Arthur's Whisky |
| Best Feature Film | Blue for a Boy |
| Best Feature Film | Maxxie Lawow: Drag Super-Shero |
| Best Feature Film | Out |
| Best Short Film | Hey You |
| Best Short Film | Lay-By |
| Best Short Film | Magic Cottage |
| Best Short Film | Sister Wives |
| Best Short Film | Their Universe |
| Best Short Film | Turbo Dum |
| Best Music Video | Left for Dead |
| Best Music Video | Peach PRC – Like a Girl Does |
| Best Music Video | Transformation of Acceptance |
| Best Documentary | As Leaves in the Wind |
| Best Documentary | Avant-Drag! |
| Best Documentary | Burning World |
| Best Documentary | Hello Stranger |
| Best Documentary | Layered Identities: Intersectionality and LGBT+ Rights |
| Best Documentary | Waiting, Funding, Dancing: The Crisis in Trans Healthcare |
| Best Performance | Eurydice Correia (Midnight on MSN) |
| Best Performance | Léopold Buchsbaum (Jeanne) |
| Best Performance | Lyndon Henley Hanrahan (I Hope He Doesn't Kill Me) |
| Best Performance | Neil Summerville (For Queen and Country) |
| Best Performance | Sian Kayleigh (Viva La Vulva) |
| Best Performance | Yên Sen (Clementine) |
| Best Student Film | All the Young Dudes |
| Best Student Film | Dust |
| Best Student Film | I Hope He Doesn't Kill Me |
| Best Student Film | Midnight on MSN |
| Best Student Film | Synergy |
| Best Student Film | Viva La Vulva |
| Best Animated Film | (W)Hole |
| Best Animated Film | Maxxie Lawow: Drag Super-Shero |
| Best Animated Film | Talkin' Trash |
| Best Animated Film | The Pansy of Pickadee |

== Official Selection ==
2023 Season (4 November 2023)
| Project | Director(s) | Runtime | Type | Country |
|---|---|---|---|---|
| A Stroll Through Colmar | Jules Mahé, Vaughn Trudeau | 2:25 | Short Film | United States |
| Absent Bodies | Antonius Ghosn | 26:14 | Short Film | Lebanon |
| Black Queer Futures | Louis Femi Adebowale | 10:00 | Short Film | United Kingdom |
| Bold | Myrriah Xochitl | 3:24 | Music Video | Canada |
| Call Me Miles | Wynand Dreyer | 51:27 | Feature Film | South Africa |
| Dash | Rory Fleck Byrne | 14:56 | Short Film | Ireland |
| Dogma | Fernando García Arias | 26:38 | Short Film | Colombia |
| Flowers | Nicholas Hansell | 20:11 | Short Film | United States |
| Friday Night Shidduch | Zara Woolf | 15:00 | Short Film | United Kingdom |
| Hold You Down | Jean Charles Charavin | 5:18 | Music Video | United States |
| In my own image | Giuseppe Bucci | 12:00 | Short Film | Italy |
| Love Is Hell | Brendan Void | 2:56 | Music Video | United Kingdom |
| Making Up | Ryan Paige | 15:00 | Short Film | United Kingdom |
| Paradise | Minki Hong | 29:57 | Short Film | Korea, Republic of |
| Piecht | Luka Lara Steffen | 29:57 | Short Film | Germany |
| RE:GEN(D)ERATION | Mihaly Szabados, Hanlon Uafás-Álainn | 32:57 | Short Film | Canada |
| Rise Like A Phoenix | Carl Hunter | 8:10 | Short Film | United Kingdom |
| Stonewall Postal Action Network | Sarah Elizabeth Drummond | 12:00 | Short Film | United Kingdom |
| Sweet Forty | Annlin Chao | 15:00 | Short Film | United Kingdom |
| The Prince's Dilemma | Devin Rowe | 5:00 | Short Film | United States |
