= Municipal Borough of Romford =

Former local government area in the UK

Coordinates: 51.5812°N 0.1837°E

Romford
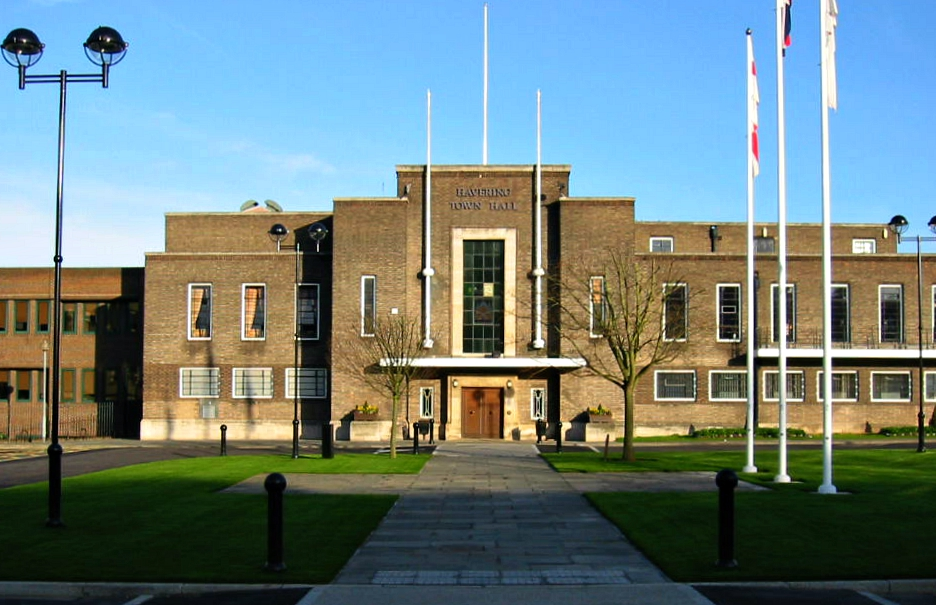
- Romford Town Hall

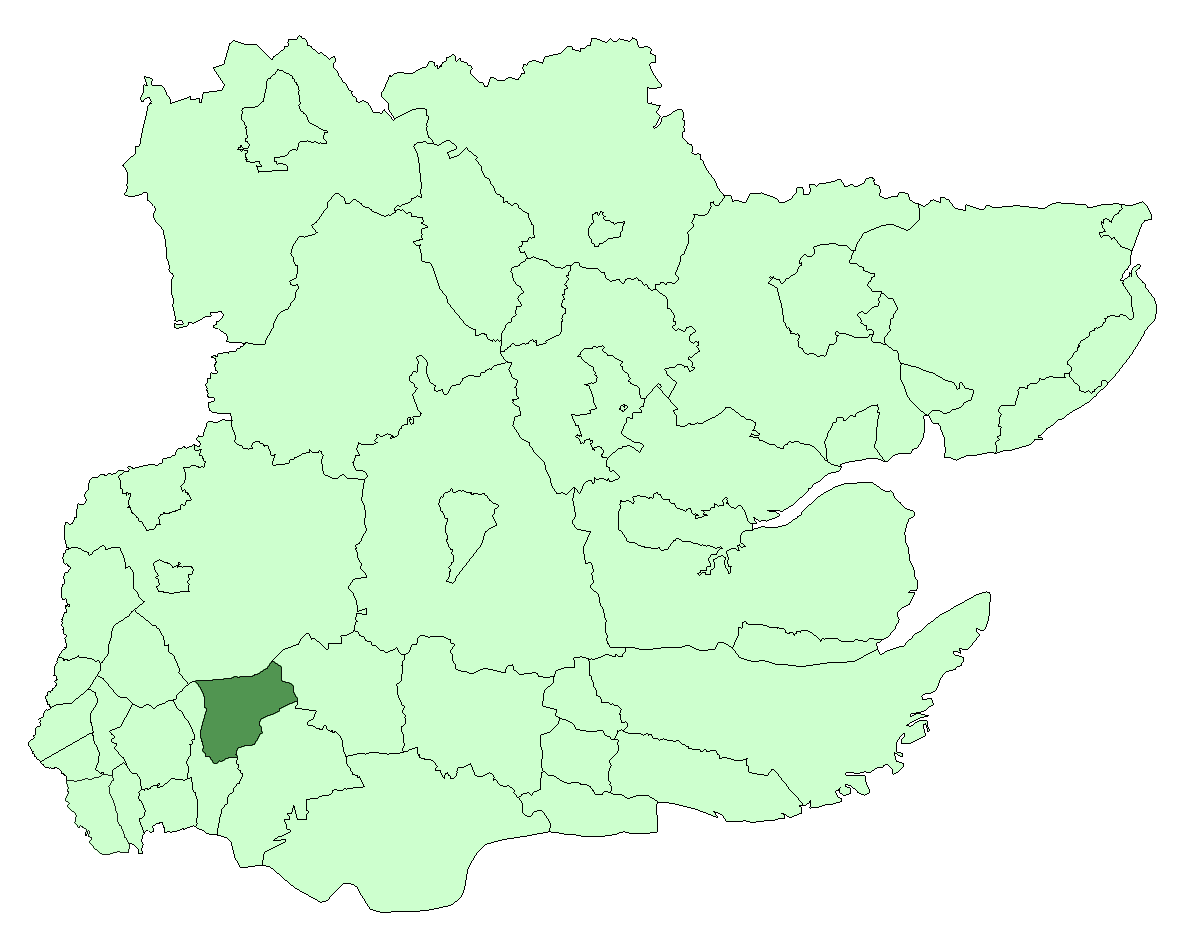
- Romford within Essex in 1961
- Area
  - 1911: 5,630 acres (22.8 km^{2})
  - 1931: 5,627 acres (22.8 km^{2})
  - 1961: 9,342 acres (37.8 km^{2})
- Population
  - 1911: 16,970
  - 1931: 35,918
  - 1961: 114,584
- Density
  - 1911: 3/acre
  - 1931: 6/acre
  - 1961: 12/acre
- History
  - Created: 1894
  - Abolished: 1965
  - Succeeded by: London Borough of Havering
- Status: Local board district (1851–1894); Urban district (1894–1937); Municipal borough (1937–1965)
- Government: Romford Board of Health (1851–1894); Romford Urban District Council (1894–1937); Romford Borough Council (1937–1965)
  - HQ: Romford
  - Motto: Serve with gladness
- Coat of arms of the borough council
- Subdivisions
  - Type: Civil parishes
  - Units: Romford (1851–1894)^{[note a]} Romford Urban (1894–1900); Romford (1900–1965); Noak Hill (1934–1965); Havering-atte-Bower (1934–1965)

Romford was a local government district in southwest Essex from 1851 to 1965 around the town of Romford. It was significantly expanded in 1934 and gained the status of municipal borough in 1937. The population density of the district consistently increased during its existence and its former area now corresponds to the northern part of the London Borough of Havering in Greater London.

== Background and formation ==
Romford had formed a chapelry in the historic Liberty of Havering, becoming a civil parish in its own right in 1849. In 1851 a local board of health was set up for the parish; although its area was reduced in 1855 to cover only the southwest part of the parish covering the town. The local board convened at St Edward's Hall in Laurie Square from 1851 to 1853 and used the old liberty court house from 1853 to 1869. From 1869 it was based in offices in the marketplace and finally purchased the old court house in 1892. In 1894 the local board's area became Romford urban district as part of the Local Government Act 1894. This caused the parish to be divided into Romford Urban and Romford Rural, with the outer part becoming a component of Romford Rural District.

== District and borough ==
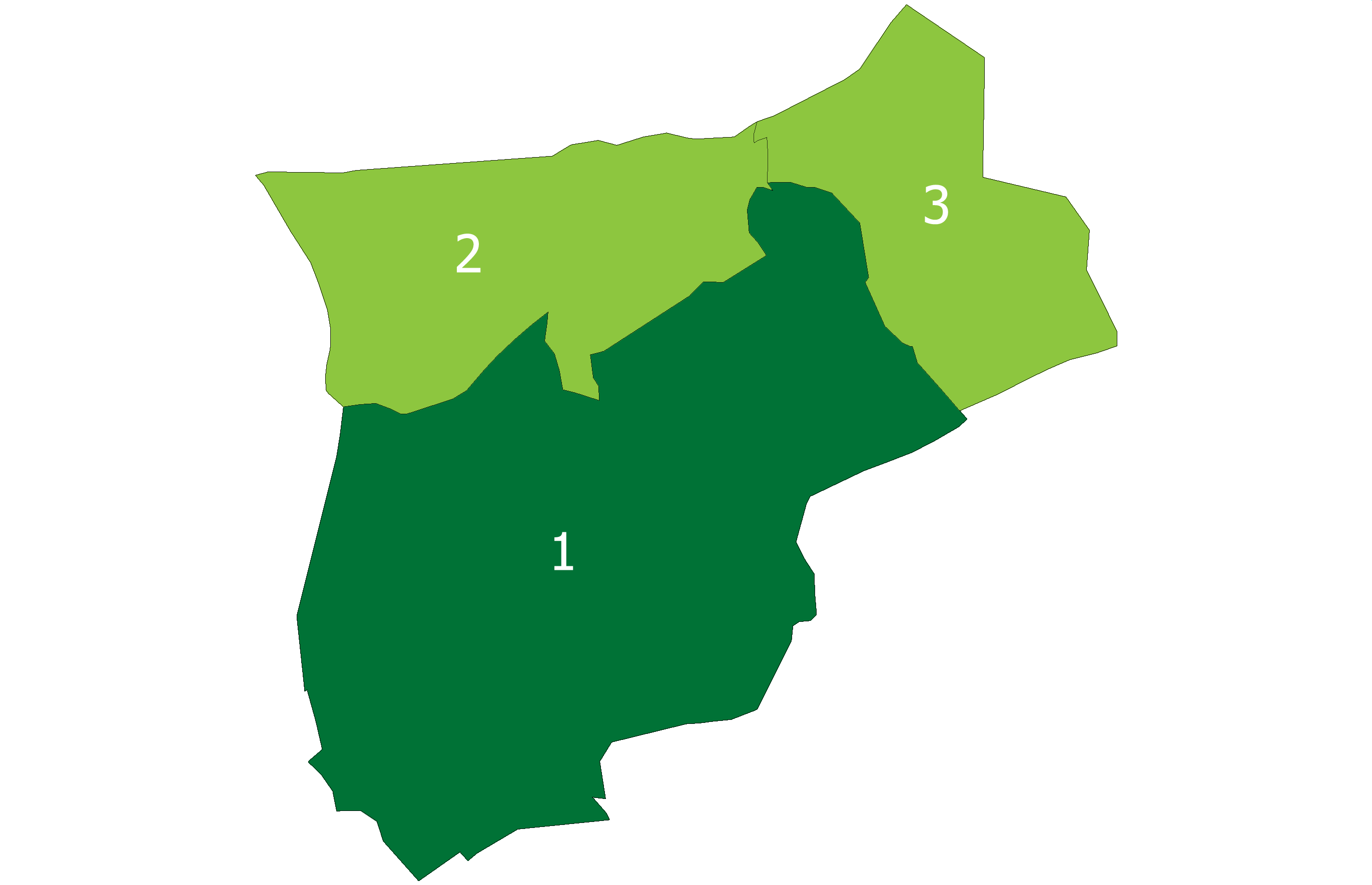
1. Romford in 1911; 2. Havering-atte-Bower; 3. Noak Hill (absorbed in 1934)

From 1894 to 1900 the urban district consisted of the civil parish of Romford Urban. In 1900 the two Romford parishes were recombined and the urban district was expanded to cover the reconstituted parish of Romford from 1900 to 1934. The urban district was surrounded by Romford Rural District until 1934 when the rural district was abolished and the urban district gained the parishes of Noak Hill and Havering-atte-Bower. The urban district council continued to meet at the old court house until it was demolished in 1933. The Romford urban district was incorporated as a municipal borough in 1937 and the council moved to a new town hall on Main Road (formerly Hare Street).

== Civic works ==
The local board purchased Romford Market in 1892. Public swimming baths were provided in Mawney Road in 1900.

In 1901 the council proposed to build a network tram lines, connecting with the Ilford Urban District Council Tramways system and passing through the parish of Dagenham. The Romford and District Tramways Act 1903 permitted construction, but it was not built.

== Abolition ==
The Royal Commission on Local Government in Greater London considered the borough for inclusion in Greater London and in 1965 the municipal borough was abolished by the London Government Act 1963. Its former area was transferred to Greater London from Essex and combined with that of Hornchurch Urban District to form the present-day London Borough of Havering.

== Population ==
Year	1901	1911	1921	1931	1941	1951	1961
Population	13,656	16,970	19,442	35,918		88,002	114,584

== Gallery ==
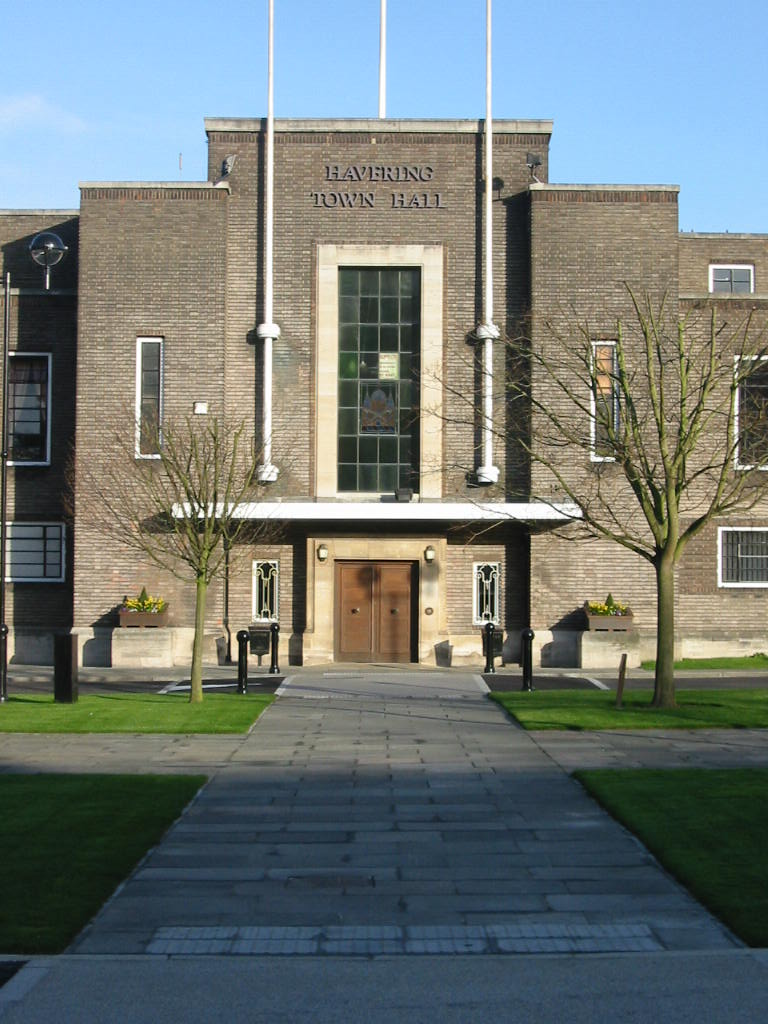
Romford Town Hall entrance

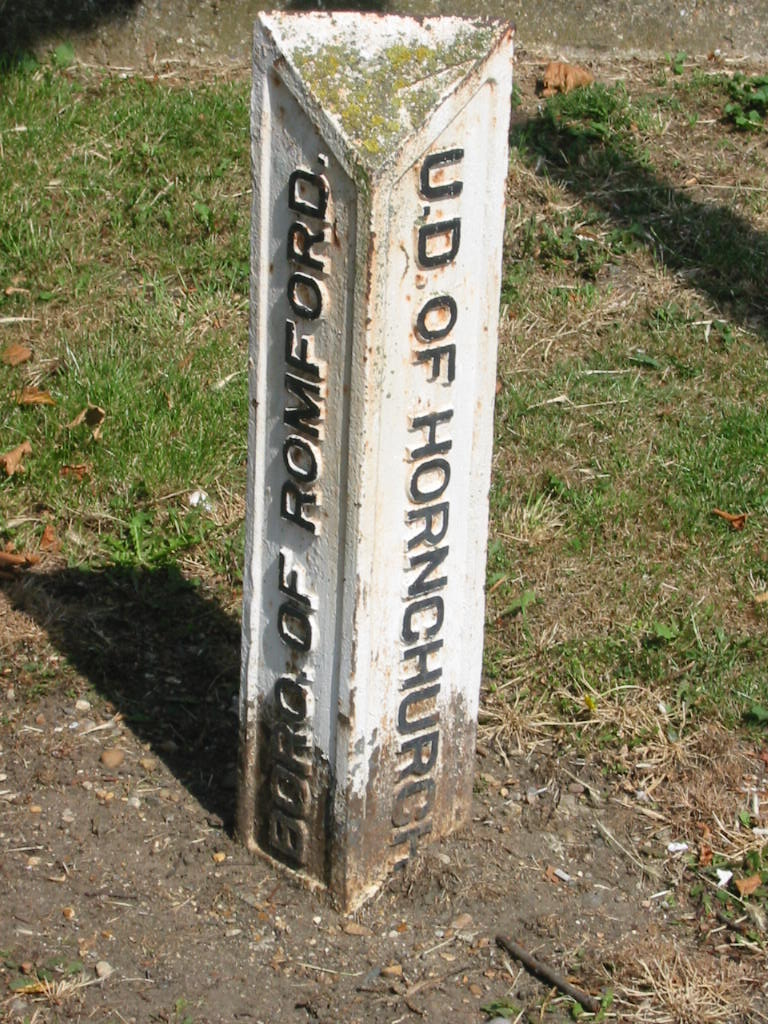
Boundary marker at Roneo Corner

== See also ==
- John Basil Poel

== Notes ==
- ^note a : The whole parish from 1851 to 1855, part thereafter.
