= Rise Park (disambiguation) =

Rise Park could refer to:

- Rise Park, neighbourhood in Havering, London
  - Rise Park (park), urban park in Havering, London
  - Rise Park (ward), for Havering Council
- Rise Park, Nottingham
