= The Brewery (shopping centre) =

Coordinates: 51.575°N 0.180°E

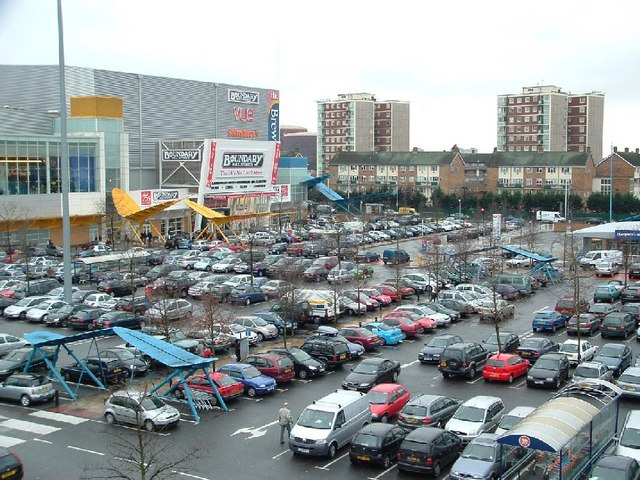
- Location: Romford, England
- Opened: May 2001
- Manager: Savills
- Owner: Schroders
- Floor area: 530,000 square feet (49,000 m^{2})
- Floors: 3
- Parking: 1,700
- Website: Official website

The Brewery is a shopping and leisure centre in Romford town centre, in the London Borough of Havering, England. It is located on the site of the former Star Brewery, and it opened in 2001. It is—along with The Liberty and The Mercury—one of the three main shopping centres in Romford.

In 2010, a 25% stake in the complex was sold by the Henderson Group to Prudential Property Investment Managers for £44.25m. At the time of the sale, its location in east London, mix of retail and leisure uses, and the Sainsbury's anchor store were explained as factors for its sustained success during the late-2000s recession.

Leisure uses in the centre include a bowling and amusement arcade unit, a cinema, and a number of restaurants. The Brewery is located within Romford's town centre and is near to Romford railway station. A number of London Buses serve the centre and route 165 terminates within The Brewery car park.

== History ==
In 1708, the Star Brewery was founded as a change for Romford. For 285 years, it served as a main industry, and occupied 20 acres of land and had 1000 workers by 1970. In 1993, the Star Brewery permanently closed and was later demolished.

In 1999, construction for The Brewery Shopping Centre began on the plot of the old Star Brewery – and by May of 2001 construction was completed and The Brewery subsequently opened. Services that came with its opening included Sainsbury's, which had moved from The Mercury, and Ster Century Cinemas, along with many other services. However, Ster Century was replaced by Vue in 2005, after a buyout.
