= Romford Recorder =

Local newspaper in London, England

- Front cover on 2 January 2026
- Type: Weekly newspaper
- Format: Tabloid
- Owner: USA Today Co.
- Publisher: Newsquest
- Editor: Simon Murfitt
- Founded: 1899
- Language: English
- Headquarters: Queens House, 55/56 Lincolns Inn Fields, London, WC2A 3LJ
- Country: England
- Circulation: 8,852 (as of 2024)
- ISSN: 0961-3382
- Website: www.romfordrecorder.co.uk

The Romford Recorder is a local newspaper for the town of Romford and the wider London Borough of Havering.

== History ==
The newspaper was established in 1899.

In 1934, the paper successfully defended itself against an accusation of libel by Frederick Standen, a member of Hornchurch Urban District Council, who claimed a letter published had incorrectly linked private interest in the development of a housing estate to his elected office.

In 1957, during petrol rationing caused by the Suez Crisis, the paper was found to be in contempt of the House of Commons for printing the headline "MPs too kind to themselves" for a story about parliamentarian petrol allowances.

Following the departure of Mark Sweetingham in 2013, there ceased to be a single editor for the publication and responsibility was shared with other publications.

Archant, including the Romford Recorder, was purchased by Newsquest in 2022.

In 2024, the publication won a three-year legal battle with Havering London Borough Council over the publication of an internal investigation into racism that found discrimination had been "normalised" at the authority.

== Circulation ==
During 2024, the publication had an average circulation of 8,852 from paid and free copies.
