= Rise Park =

Coordinates: 51.596281°N 0.181285°E

- Location within Greater London
- London borough: Havering
- Ceremonial county: Greater London
- Region: London
- Country: England
- Sovereign state: United Kingdom
- Post town: ROMFORD
- Postcode district: RM1
- Dialling code: 01708
- Police: Metropolitan
- Fire: London
- Ambulance: London
- London Assembly: Havering and Redbridge

Rise Park is an area of Romford, a district in the London Borough of Havering. It is also the name of an urban park in the neighbourhood.

== History ==
Romford Borough Council were given 23 acres of land by Thomas England in 1937 and used it to create a park.

The council intended to use land at Rise Park for council houses. However, in 1953 the compulsory purchase order was blocked. It was then developed with 400 houses for private sale.

== Governance ==
There was a Rise Park electoral ward for elections to Havering Council from 1978 to 2002.

== Urban park ==
The neighbourhood contains an urban park also called Rise Park. It is one of a series of parks which stretch northwards from the railway line at Romford. The southern entrance is just north of the A12 Eastern Avenue, and the northern entrance is on Lower Bedfords Road. There are four other entrances located in Beauly Way, Dee Way, Garry Close, and Isbell Gardens.
