= Collier Row =

Area in Havering in east London, England

Coordinates: 51.5931°N 0.1736°E

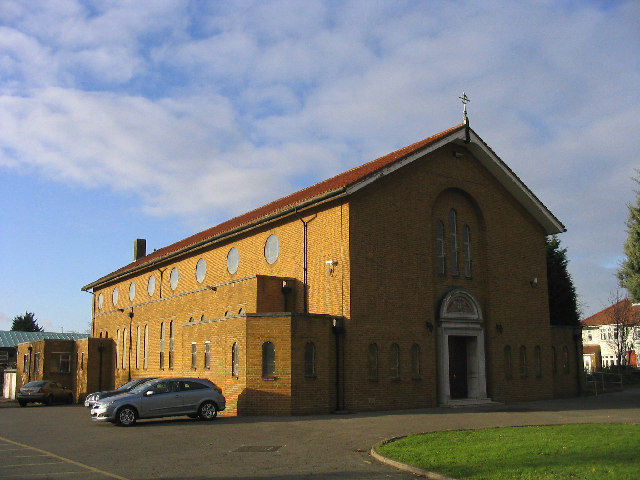
- Corpus Christi Church

- Location within Greater London
- OS grid reference: TQ505905
  - Charing Cross: 14 mi (23 km) SW
- London borough: Havering
- Ceremonial county: Greater London
- Region: London
- Country: England
- Sovereign state: United Kingdom
- Post town: ROMFORD
- Postcode district: RM5, RM7
- Dialling code: 01708
- Police: Metropolitan
- Fire: London
- Ambulance: London
- UK Parliament: Romford
- London Assembly: Havering and Redbridge

Collier Row is a neighbourhood to the north of Romford in East London, England, within the London Borough of Havering. It is a suburban development located 14 miles (23 km) northeast of Charing Cross.

== History ==
Its name originates from charcoal burners who used to occupy the area.

The area is based on a large housing estate built during the 1930s as part of the inter-war London housing expansion, with shopping facilities around a central crossroads.

Remains of a Roman settlement have been uncovered in the area.

== Transport ==
The area is not connected to the London Underground or National Rail networks; however, Hainault and Newbury Park Underground stations (Central line) and Romford railway station are nearby. Transport for London bus routes 103, 175, 247, 252, 294, 365 (24 hour) and 375 serve the local area, and it is planned that a future extension of the East London Transit could serve the area.

The A12 (Eastern Avenue), which runs through Collier Row at its southern end, leads to London and the east coast of Essex, and crosses the M25 on its eastern section.

== Geography ==
Collier Row is located north of Romford within the London Borough of Havering and 14 miles (23 km) northeast of Charing Cross in Central London. It includes a town centre with housing extending to the north.

=== Nearest places ===
- Hainault
- Marks Gate
- Rise Park
- Havering-atte-Bower
- Romford
- Chigwell Row

== Education ==
Situated on Havering Road, Parklands School (both primary and junior) opened in 1929–1931. In 1995 the school was given "Beacon Status" due to the high standards of education provided. It is one of the largest primary schools in the area. Other schools in Collier Row includes

- Clockhouse Primary School
- Crownfield Infant School
- Crownfield Junior School
- St. Patrick’s Catholic Primary School

- Parklands Primary School

Bower Park Academy is the Secondary School
