= The Mercury Mall =

Coordinates: 51.5794°N 0.1857°E

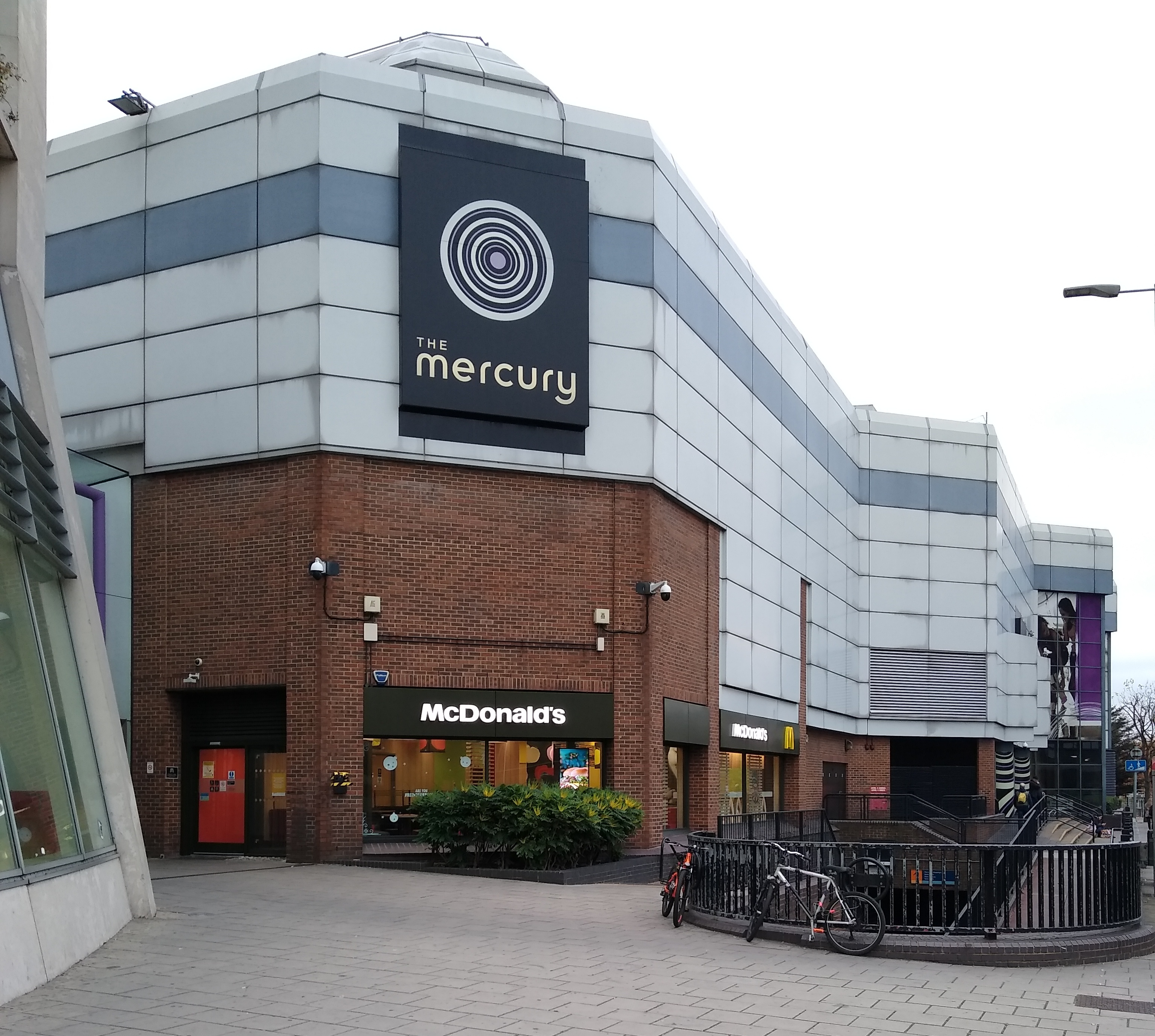
- Location: Romford, England
- Opened: June 1990
- Num. of stores: approx 45
- Num. of anchor tenants: 2 (1 vacant)
- Floor area: 188,000 square feet (17,500 m^{2})
- Floors: 4 (1 closed)
- Parking: 999
- Website: Official website

The Mercury Mall is an enclosed shopping centre in Romford town centre, in the London Borough of Havering, Greater London. It opened in June 1990 as Liberty 2. From 2006 to August 2010 it was owned by The Mall Fund and was known as The Mall Romford. It is—along with The Liberty and The Brewery—one of the three main shopping centres in Romford.

== History ==
The Liberty 2 opened with a mix of retail and leisure tenants, although these were spatially separated with the shops on the first two levels and the nightclub, cinema and bingo hall on the third floor. The name referred to existing Liberty Shopping Centre.

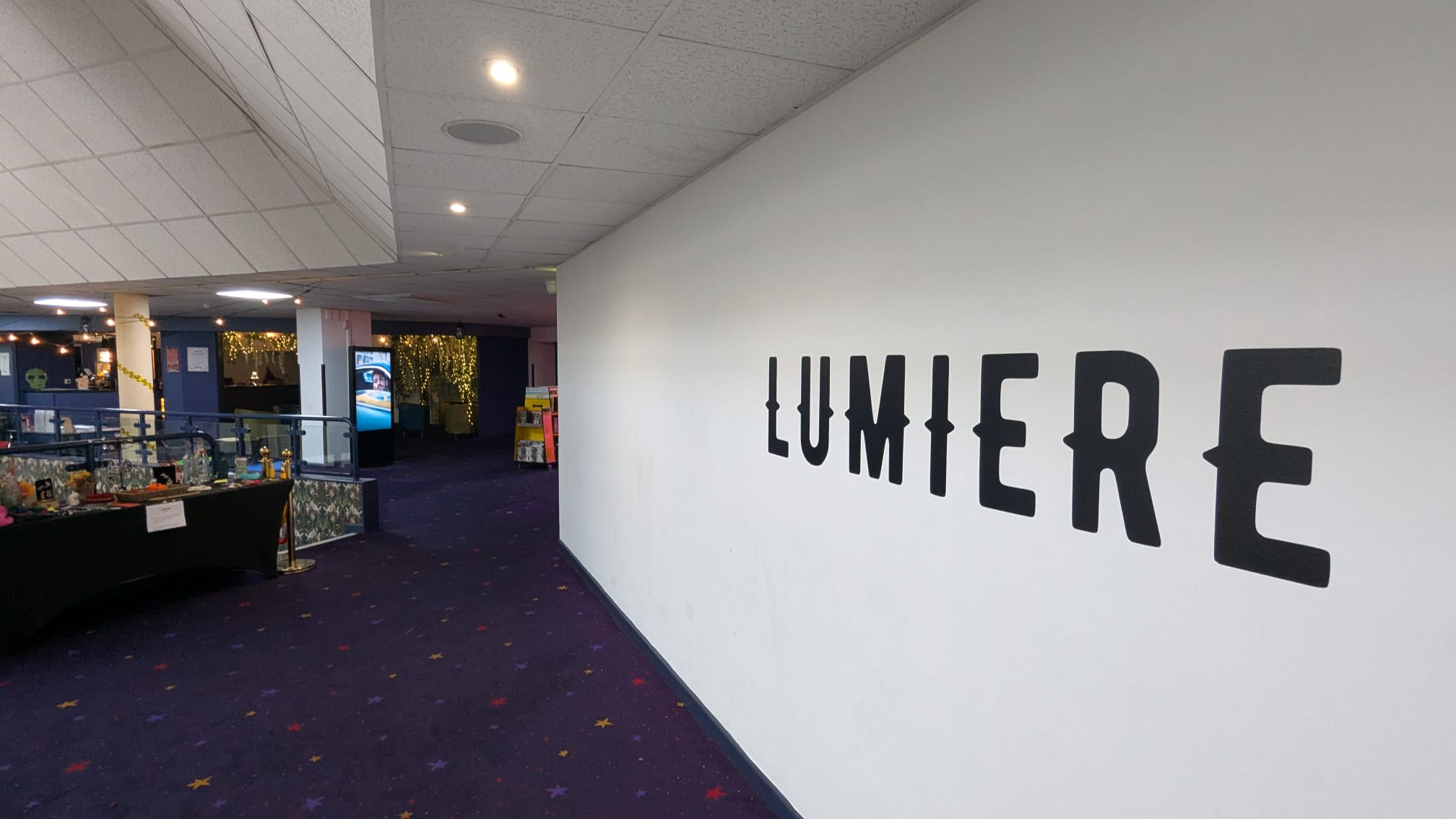
Lumiere Cinema Romford on Floor 3 of the Mercury Mall

It was initially anchored by a Sainsbury's supermarket, but when this relocated to The Brewery elsewhere in the town centre, the former supermarket space in the mall was taken by Wilko. In 2001 shortly after the opening of The Brewery the Odeon Cinema closed, but reopened in 2012 as Premiere Cinemas which was then the cheapest multiplex cinema in the UK.

In 2006 the Liberty 2 was expanded with the redevelopment of the adjacent former Dolphin Centre to form part of the retail site. The redevelopment included the development of a new anchor store, an Asda supermarket, which was also linked into the mall at level two. The redevelopment also saw a housing block above the supermarket site. As part of the revamp, the centre - which had previously still been heavily carrying the 'Liberty 2' branding - was rebranded under The Mall Fund's corporate identity.

The Mercury has been used as a filming location; for instance, it was featured in the Reebok "Belly's gonna getcha!" television advertisement. In the advert one can clearly see The Mercury's lifts. The centre is also frequently used in hidden camera TV shows Bad Robot's and Off Their Rockers.

In 2011 the centre was sold to Rockspring UK and The Other Retail Group as part of a package of centres from The Mall Fund, the centre was then rebranded The Mercury Mall.

In 2013 The Mercury Mall became the backdrop for the horror movie Death Walks.

In 2014 Rockspring announced it was to sell its raft of shopping centres, these centres were sold to Ellandi and Lone Star.

Since 2017 the Mercury has been the home of Romford Film Festival, showing movies over 5 to 6 days at the Premiere Cinema during the months of May or June.

On October 8th 2023, due to the entire chain collapsing into administration, the anchoring Wilko store was closed down.

In 2024, the Premiere Cinema ceased trading. In 2025, the cinema was re-opened as Lumiere Cinema Romford by non-profit cooperative the Romford Film Trust.

== Layout ==
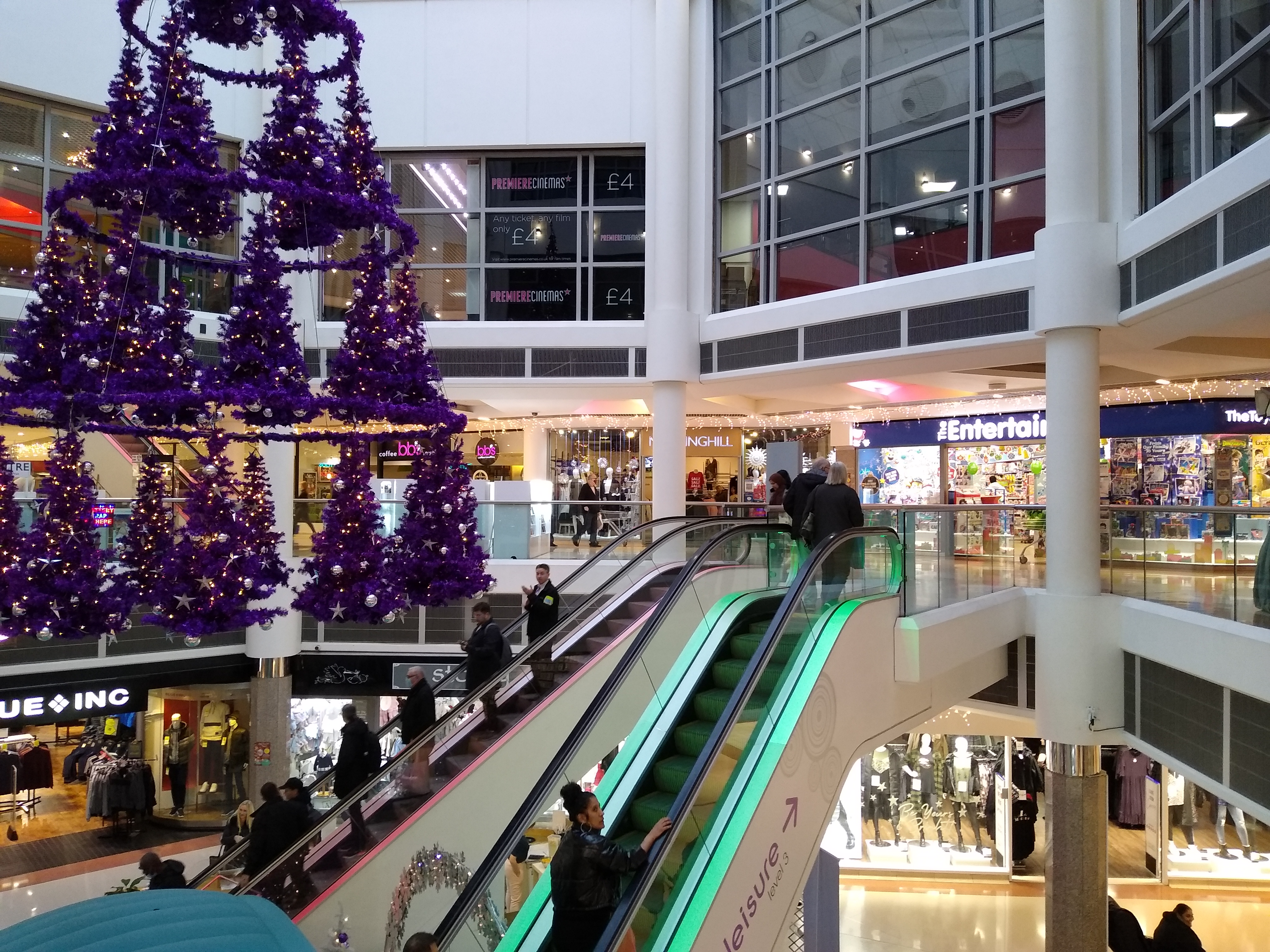
Interior

The Mercury is separated from the adjacent The Liberty shopping centre at ground level by the Romford ring road, but is connected to it by an underground section of the shopping mall, accessed from the lower level, which leads up into The Liberty. Although the two centres are connected physically in this way, they are independently owned and are run separately from one another.

It comprises two levels of retail stores, and a third level which includes a Mecca Bingo hall, Stages Dance Studio, and Lumiere Cinema Romford since 2025. There is a forth level which used to be the home of Pulse Nightclub, which closed in 1999 - leaving the fourth floor abandoned and unused.

The centre is iconic in Romford due to its glass dome enclosure, which is represented frequently in local art and illustration.

Other stores and services in The Mercury include McDonald's.
