= Becontree Hundred =

Former administrative division of Essex, England

Becontree
- Area
  - 1831: 35,950 acres (145.5 km^{2})
  - 1887: 37,705 acres (152.59 km^{2})
- Population
  - 1851: 46,777
  - 1887: 221,217
- History
  - Created: in antiquity
  - Abolished: 1894
  - Succeeded by: various, see text
- Status: hundred
  - HQ: Becontree Heath

Becontree was an ancient hundred in the south west of the county of Essex, England. Its area has been entirely absorbed by the growth of London; with its name reused in 1921 for the large Becontree estate of the London County Council. Its former area now corresponds to the London Borough of Newham, the London Borough of Barking and Dagenham and parts of the London Borough of Waltham Forest and the London Borough of Redbridge. Its early extent also included parts of what is now the London Borough of Havering.

== History ==
The name is first recorded in the 1086 Domesday Book as Beuentreu, meaning tree of a man called Beohha. The original tree, at Becontree Heath, was the location that early hundred meetings took place. Before 1465 it included the area of Havering liberty, which comprised the parishes of Hornchurch, Romford and Havering-atte-Bower, and thus the hundred meeting place was not originally located on the fringe of the area. After the area of the liberty was removed, the hundred contained the parishes of Barking (including Great Ilford), Dagenham, East Ham, Leyton, Little Ilford, Walthamstow, Wanstead and West Ham.

The southern boundary with the Blackheath hundred of Kent was the River Thames, however there was also a land boundary; the Woolwich parish included two small detached parts north of the river, totalling 402 acres (1.63 km^{2}). In the east it bordered the Havering liberty and to the north Waltham and Ongar hundreds. The River Lea formed the western boundary with the Tower division of the Ossulstone hundred of Middlesex. The River Roding runs roughly north to south through the area.

In 1831, the hundred occupied 35,950 acres (145.5 km^{2}). In 1840 the hundred was included in the Metropolitan Police District by the Metropolitan Police Act 1839. The population of the hundred in 1851 was 46,777 and in 1861, 73,023. In 1887 the area is recorded as 37,705 acres (152.59 km^{2}) and the population as 221,217.

== Replacement ==
The hundreds of England declined in administrative use because of the rise of various ad hoc boards. By 1894 they were effectively replaced by a system of uniform local government districts, which were consolidated over time and finally replaced in 1965 by the London boroughs which are still in use.

Parish	District	Today
Barking	Barking Town Urban District	Barking and Dagenham
Dagenham	Romford Rural District	Barking and Dagenham
East Ham	East Ham Urban District	Newham
Ilford	Ilford Urban District	Redbridge
Leyton	Leyton Urban District	Waltham Forest
Little Ilford	East Ham Urban District	Newham
Walthamstow	Walthamstow Urban District	Waltham Forest
Wanstead	Wanstead Urban District	Redbridge
West Ham	County Borough of West Ham	Newham
Woodford	Woodford Urban District	Redbridge

== See also ==
- Hundreds of Essex
