= Havering Town Hall =

Municipal building in London, England

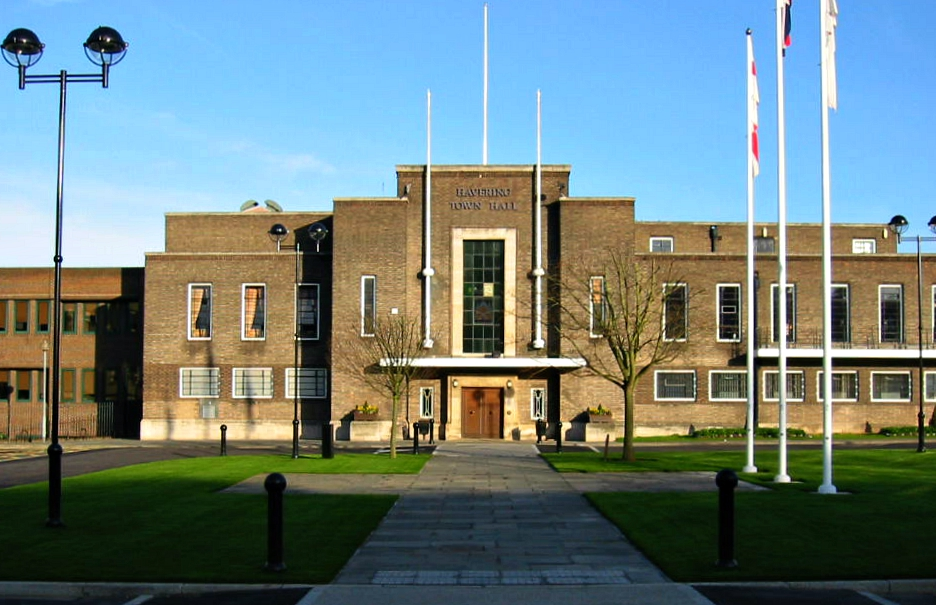
- Havering Town Hall

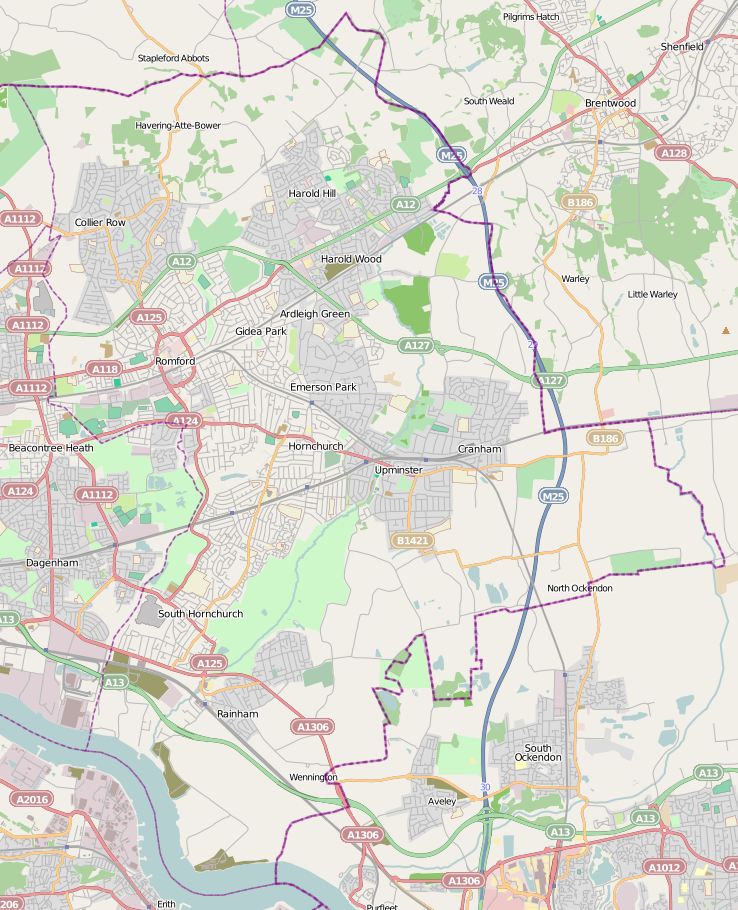
- Shown in Havering
- 51.5814°N 0.1836°E
- Location: Main Road, Romford

History
- Built: 1937

Site notes
- Architect(s): Herbert R. Collins and Antoine Englebert O. Geens
- Architectural style: International Moderne style

Listed Building – Grade II
- Designated: 17 February 1999
- Reference no.: 1245551

Havering Town Hall is a municipal building in Main Road, Romford, London. The town hall, which is the headquarters of Havering London Borough Council, is a Grade II listed building.

== History ==
In the second half of the 19th century the local board of health was based in offices in the Market Place in Romford before acquiring the old court house of the independent liberty of Havering on the south side of the Market Place in 1892. The local board was restructured as an urban district in 1894 and, after the old court house became inadequate for their needs, civic leaders decided to procure a purpose-built town hall: the site selected in Main Road had previously been open land. The council relocated to temporary offices in South Street in 1931 while it waited for the new building to become available.

The foundation stone for the new building was laid by the local member of parliament, John Parker, on 28 November 1936. It was designed by Herbert R. Collins and Antoine Englebert O. Geens in the International Moderne style, built by Thomas Bates & Son in brown brick and was officially opened as Romford Town Hall by the Lord Mayor of London, Sir George Broadbridge, on 16 September 1937. The district was also incorporated as a municipal borough that year and Broadbridge took the opportunity to present the charter of incorporation to the charter mayor, Councillor Charles Allen, on the same day. The design for the building, which had a Scandinavian element to it, involved an asymmetrical main frontage facing onto Main Road; it featured a tower on the left with a doorway and canopy on the ground floor and a tall window on the first floor flanked by flagpoles with a further flagpole on the roof; to the right were eleven bays with windows on each of the ground and first floors. The building was extended by three bays to the left in a similar style in 1960. Internally, the main rooms were council chamber and two large committee rooms.

The building remained the local seat of government, and was renamed "Havering Town Hall", when the expanded London Borough of Havering was formed in 1965. Queen Elizabeth II, accompanied by the Duke of Edinburgh, attended a civic lunch with council officials on 6 March 2003.

The town hall was extensively restored and redecorated in autumn 2017. In the council chamber, the coats of arms of Havering and Ludwigshafen are displayed.

In May 2024, the town hall experienced an arson attack, damaging the property but not leading to any injuries or loss of data.
