= Dolphin Centre =

Former leisure centre in Romford, England

Coordinates: 51.579°N 0.184°E

The Dolphin Centre was a swimming and leisure facility in Romford, in the London Borough of Havering, England.

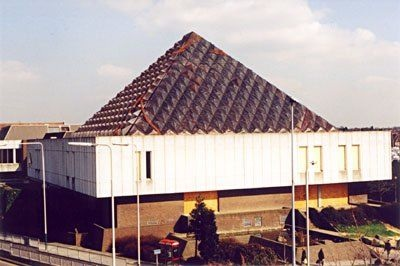
Dolphin centre early 2000s

== History ==
Havering London Borough Council approved the design and £7.5 million construction of the Dolphin Centre in April 1980; it was named after a public house which existed in the nearby Romford Market from 1630 to 1900. When the centre was opened in April 1982, by Prince Richard, Duke of Gloucester, it had a state-of-the-art pyramid roof (the first of its kind in Europe). However, corrosion and the collapse of one of the panels in the roof led to it being draped with netting in 1990 to calm safety fears.

As well as the swimming pool, with its slides and wave machine, the Dolphin also contained a gymnasium and squash courts, and acted as a community functions centre for meetings, social events and exhibitions.

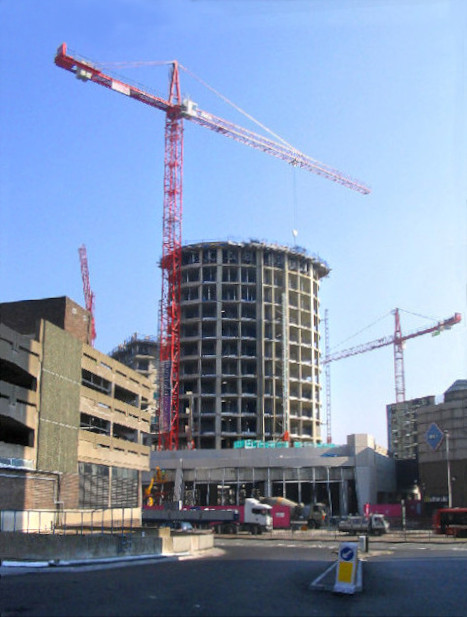
Redevelopment work in 2005

After thirteen years, the Dolphin Centre was closed to the public in April 1995 in the face of escalating operating costs and repayments on the finance lease. The site remained derelict until June 2003 when it was agreed to demolish the centre and build a new 15-storey residential tower block, providing over 200 new homes, above an Asda supermarket there. Demolition of the Dolphin Centre commenced in July 2004 and construction of the new development began in October 2004.

Sapphire Ice and Leisure, including a replacement town centre swimming pool, opened in 2018.
