= Royal Liberty of Havering =

Royal manor and liberty in England

Havering Havering-atte-Bower
- Area
  - 1831: 12,550 acres (50.8 km^{2})
  - 1892: 12,550 acres (50.8 km^{2})
- Population
  - 1831: 6,812
- History
  - Origin: Hornchurch parish in the Becontree Hundred of Essex
  - Created: 12th century
  - Abolished: 1 July 1892
  - Succeeded by: Reincorporated with Essex
- Status: Royal manor (11th century–1828); Liberty (1465–1892)
- Government: Havering Quarter Sessions
  - HQ: Court House, Market Place, Romford
- Seal of Havering
- Subdivisions
  - Type: Chapelries (later became parishes)
  - Units: 1. Romford; 2. Havering atte Bower; 3. Hornchurch
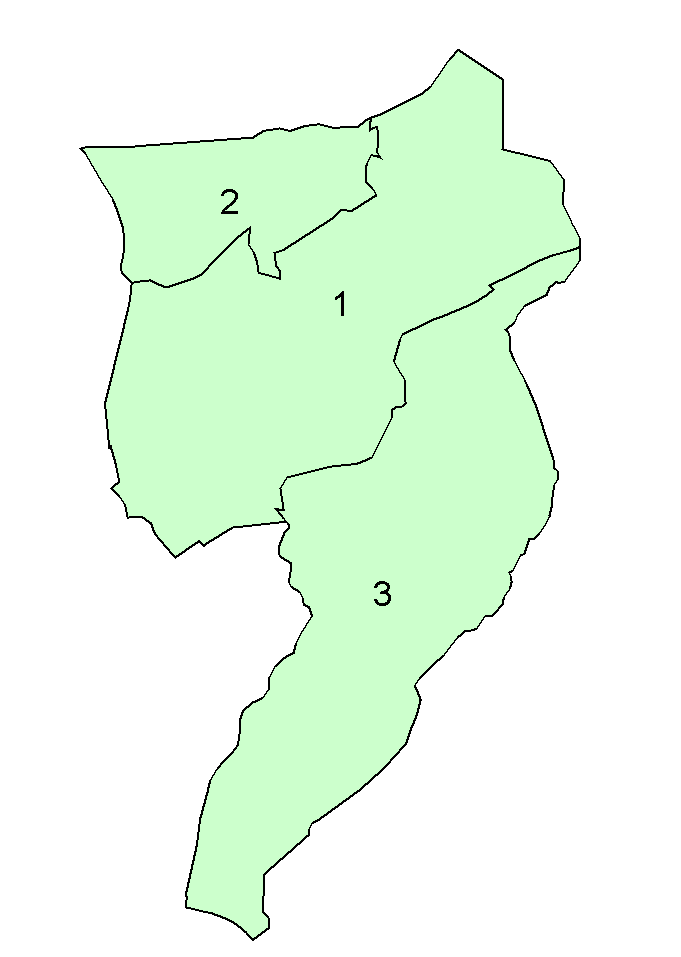
- Three parishes of the liberty in 1881

Havering, also known as Havering-atte-Bower, was a royal manor and ancient liberty whose area now forms part of, and gives its name to, the London Borough of Havering in Greater London. The manor was in the possession of the Crown from the 11th to the 19th centuries and was the location of Havering Palace from the 13th to the late 17th century. It occupied the same area as the ancient parish of Hornchurch which was divided into the three chapelries of Havering, Hornchurch and Romford.

== History ==
=== Toponymy ===
The name Havering is recorded in the 1086 Domesday Book as "Haueringas" and means 'the settlement of the family or followers of a man called Hæfer', an ancient folk name. From the 13th century the suffix -atte-Bower was added and means 'at the royal residence'. The London Borough of Havering and the small settlement of Havering-atte-Bower continue to use these names.

=== Formation ===
Havering Palace, a resort house for hunting, was well established by the early 12th century. This suggests that the manor of Havering was in royal ownership prior to 1066, although the beginning of its association with royalty is unrecorded. Havering was recorded as part of the Becontree hundred of Essex in the Domesday Book of 1086. The manor was held directly by the Crown, with the monarch acting as lord of the manor. Because they were not normally resident in Havering, and did not appoint a representative to act in their place, the residents of Havering enjoyed unusual autonomy. In 1251 Havering had a population of nearly 2,000.

=== Liberty charters ===
A liberty was formed by charter for the manor of Havering in 1465. The charter issued in 1465 by King Edward IV reconfirmed many existing rights. The event was celebrated by the issue of a copper token for currency in the late 18th century, which uniquely among the many coins of that era bears the date 1465. The charter gave residents of the area freedom from taxation, its own local magistrates and gaol, and, earlier, freedom from the service of writs by the Essex Quarter Sessions. The famous Romford Market was another privilege that was guaranteed under this arrangement.

=== Governance ===
The government of the liberty was in the hands of a high steward, deputy steward, clerk of the peace and coroner. The high steward was chosen by the lord of the manor. The office of deputy steward was instituted by the 1465 charter, being appointed by the high steward. The clerk of the peace and coroner were elected by the tenants and inhabitants of the liberty. In 1848 other officers of the corporation were a high bailiff, under bailiff, two head constables and nine petty constables. Gallows Corner was used as the place of execution in the liberty.

The manor and liberty originally comprised the large ancient parish of Hornchurch which was divided into eight wards. By the 16th century 'Romford side' comprising the five northern wards of Romford Town, Harold Wood, Collier Row, Noak Hill, and Havering had achieved some degree of self-government. The remaining 'Hornchurch side' consisted of Hornchurch Town, North End, and South End wards. Hornchurch Town ward was absorbed into North End and South End around 1722. Havering ward grew independent of Romford in the 17th century and became a separate parish in the 1780s. In 1849 Romford became a parish in its own right.

=== Replacement ===
The manor was sold by the Crown on 23 September 1828 and the right to appoint the high steward and justices of the liberty was transferred to the private owners. During the 19th century ad hoc boards, such as unions for poor law or public health, started to erode the powers of the liberty. It was unreformed by the Municipal Corporations Act 1835 and the Municipal Corporations Act 1883 made provision for the liberty to be absorbed into the county of Essex, but did not force the amalgamation. Under the Local Government Act 1888 the property of the liberty was merged with that of the county, and the offices of high and deputy steward were no longer filled. The separate court of quarter sessions, limited to three justices, continued to exist, and a high bailiff and coroner continued to be appointed.

One of the three justices was elected by the inhabitants of the manor. The last election took place on 3 July 1891 at the market court house. The candidates were Major Holmes of Grey Towers, Hornchurch, and Alfred William Harvey of Romford. Holmes won the election with 78 votes to 42.

On 21 October 1891 the Essex quarter sessions resolved "that a petition be presented to Her Majesty praying that an Order in Council be made to unite the Liberty of Havering-atte-Bower to the County of Essex, so far as the same is not already united by the Local Government Act, 1888." The Order in Council, under the Liberties Act 1850, was made on 9 May 1892, and came into effect on 1 July 1892. The last court leet was held on 7 June 1892. The last high bailiff was paid a pension of £3 for life, while the coroner became a county employee.

In 1894, under the Local Government Act 1894, the central part of the Romford parish, named Romford Urban formed the Romford Urban District while the remaining parts of the liberty went on to form part of Romford Rural District. The modern day London Borough of Havering, created in 1965, takes its name from the liberty and incorporates the original area and other territories formerly part of Chafford hundred, including North Ockendon, Rainham, Upminster, Cranham, and Wennington.

=== Legacy ===
Modern day references to the liberty include the Liberty Shopping Centre and Royal Liberty School. The motto of Havering London Borough Council is "Liberty". In 2024 the Romford–Upminster service of the London Overground was renamed the Liberty line.

== Geography ==
The liberty was partially bounded by rivers. To the south there was a short boundary with Erith in the Lessness hundred of Kent, formed by the River Thames. To the east the River Ingrebourne formed a boundary with the Chafford hundred of Essex and the parishes of (from north to south) South Weald, Upminster and Rainham. To the north of the liberty was much higher ground and the boundary with the Ongar hundred and the parishes of (west to east) Lambourne, Navestock and Stapleford Abbotts. The western boundary was with the reduced Becontree hundred and the parish of Dagenham, partially formed by the River Beam. To the south the lower elevation formed the Hornchurch Marshes. The London to Colchester Roman Road (now the A12) cut through the liberty further north. In 1831 the total population of the liberty was 6,812.
