= Noak Hill =

Coordinates: 51.6190°N 0.2327°E

- Village
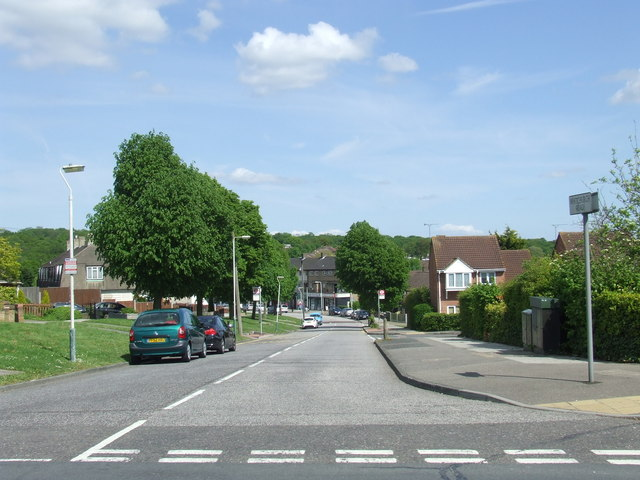
- Whitchurch Road, Noak Hill

- Location within Greater London
- OS grid reference: TQ545935
- London borough: Havering
- Ceremonial county: Greater London
- Region: London
- Country: England
- Sovereign state: United Kingdom
- Post town: ROMFORD
- Postcode district: RM3, RM4
- Dialling code: 01708
- Police: Metropolitan
- Fire: London
- Ambulance: London
- UK Parliament: Hornchurch and Upminster
- London Assembly: Havering and Redbridge

Noak Hill is a village in outer East London, in the London Borough of Havering. It is located 17.1 miles northeast of Charing Cross.

== History ==
Noak Hill was a ward in the ancient parish of Hornchurch. By the 16th century, it had come under the control of the Romford vestry and was included in the newly created Romford civil parish in 1849. On 1 October 1895, Noak Hill became a separate civil parish, being formed from part of Romford Rural, it had its own parish council until 1934. On 1 April 1965 the parish was abolished. At the 1951 census (one of the last before the abolition of the parish), Noak Hill had a population of 5610.

The name "Noak" is a corruption of the Middle English atten oak, meaning "at the oak [tree]".

== Geography ==
Noak Hill is situated on hilly terrain in the far northeastern edge of Greater London, with the M25 motorway being the boundary. The village consists of various period homes, many of which are listed buildings, a 19th-century church and scattered farms. It is located immediately north of the post-war estate of Harold Hill and east of Havering-atte-Bower.

== Transport ==
Noak Hill is served by several London Buses routes: the 256 (to Hornchurch), 294 (to Romford) and 499 (to Romford or Gallows Corner).
