= Star Brewery =

Brewery in Romford, England

Coordinates: 51.57532°N 0.17953°E

The Star Brewery was a brewery in Romford, England. For much of its history, it was a main industry and a significant employer in the area. It was closed in 1993.

The site was redeveloped as a shopping centre named The Brewery, which opened in 2001. The brewery produced John Bull Bitter, named after the archetypal English farmer.

== History ==
The brewery was founded in 1708 by Benjamin Wilson as an attachment to the Star Inn on the high street, then the main road to the City of London, and beside the River Rom. The inn and brewery were purchased by Edward Ind in 1799 becoming part of Ind Smith, and from 1845 the company was known as Ind Coope when Octavius and Edward Coope joined.

Romford railway station was opened to the south of the site in 1839 and in the 1860s a connection was made between the goods yard in South Street and the brewery via a tunnel under the railway line, the access to the railway enabling significant expansion. By 1908, with its own network of railway sidings, the brewery employed 450 workers and by 1970 it occupied 20 acres (81,000 m^{2}) and had 1,000 workers.

The brewery was closed in 1993 and demolished. The site was redeveloped in 2001 as The Brewery shopping centre, with one of the 160 ft (50 m) chimneys incorporated into the design. Part of the site is used to house the Havering Museum.
