= The Liberty =

Shopping centre in Greater London

Coordinates: 51.57750°N 0.18291°E

The Liberty Shopping Centre

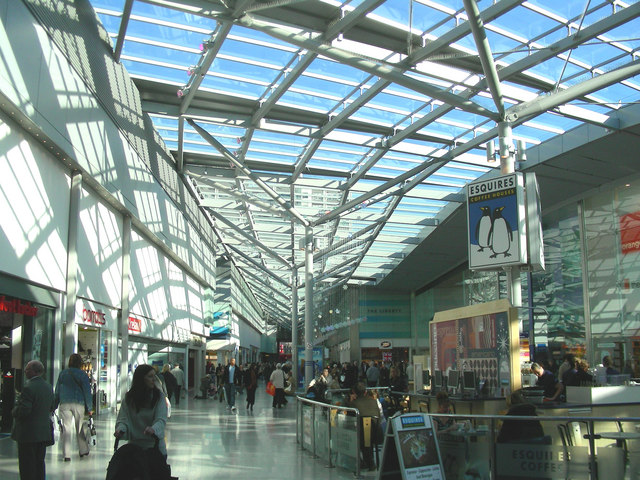
- Location: Romford, Greater London, England
- Opened: 1968; 58 years ago
- Owner: Redical AG
- Num. of stores: 100
- Num. of anchor tenants: 7
- Floor area: 432,000 square feet (40,100 m^{2})
- Floors: 1
- Parking: 806
- Public transit: Romford railway station
- Website: www.theliberty.co.uk

The Liberty, formally named The Liberty Shopping Centre, is a covered shopping centre in Romford, London, England, the largest such centre in the town. It was originally built in 1968 and underwent a four-year redevelopment completed in 2003. The centre takes its name from the former Liberty of Havering and is owned by the Cosgrave Property Group. It is also the largest indoor shopping centre in the borough of Havering overall and covers 432,000 square feet (40,100 m^{2}) of retail space, around 100 shops.

The Liberty has an annual footfall of 23 million, equating to 425,000 people per week. It is linked to The Mercury Mall (formerly known as Liberty 2) by an underpass.

== History ==
The Liberty Shopping Centre was first opened in 1968 in a joint deal between Hammerson and Standard Life Investments. In 1999 Hammerson acquired Standards Life's 50% interest for £53 million and in 2000 acquired the freehold on the land. In September 2006, Irish property developers, The Cosgrave Property Group acquired the centre from Hammerson for £281 million.

The centre underwent an extensive redevelopment which was completed in 2003 at a cost of £52 million. Previously, the main part of the centre was open-air, with several covered arcades running off from it linking it to other parts of the town centre. The changes undertaken in the 2000s included the covering of the main part of the centre with a glazed roof, and the development of a new car parking facility, plus new large stores for Next and H&M. Several existing stores were remodelled or relocated, or received other modernisations, as part of the redesign, including Boots, BHS and W H Smith.

Once the planning application had been granted for the transformation of the centre, work started in August 2001. In April 2003, the centre achieved practical completion.
