= London Borough of Havering =

Coordinates: 51°33′N 00°13′E

- London borough
- Flag Coat of arms Council logo
- Motto: Liberty
- Havering shown within Greater London
- Sovereign state: United Kingdom
- Constituent country: England
- Region: London
- Ceremonial county: Greater London
- Created: 1 April 1965
- Admin HQ: Romford

Government
  - Type: London borough council
  - Body: Havering London Borough Council
  - London Assembly: Keith Prince (Ref) AM for Havering and Redbridge
  - MPs: Andrew Rosindell (Ref); Julia Lopez (Con); Margaret Mullane (Lab)

Area
  - Total: 43.35 sq mi (112.27 km^{2})
  - Rank: 184th (of 296)

Population (2025)
  - Total: 280,787
  - Rank: 64th (of 296)
  - Density: 6,477.6/sq mi (2,501.0/km^{2})
- Time zone: UTC (GMT)
  - Summer (DST): UTC+1 (BST)
- Postcodes: RM
- Area codes: 01708, 020
- ISO 3166 code: GB-HAV
- ONS code: 00AR
- GSS code: E09000016
- Police: Metropolitan Police
- Website: www.havering.gov.uk

The London Borough of Havering (/ˈheɪvərɪŋ/) in East London, England, forms part of Outer London. It has a population of 259,552 inhabitants; the principal town is Romford, while other communities include Hornchurch, Upminster, Collier Row and Rainham. The borough is mainly suburban, with large areas of protected open space, including parts of the Metropolitan Green Belt. Romford is a major retail and night time entertainment centre, and to the south the borough extends into the London Riverside redevelopment area of the Thames Gateway. The name Havering is a reference to the Royal Liberty of Havering which occupied the area for several centuries. The local authority is Havering London Borough Council. It is the easternmost London borough.

The neighbouring districts (clockwise from south) are the London boroughs of Bexley (across the River Thames), Barking and Dagenham and Redbridge, the Essex districts of Epping Forest and Brentwood, and the unitary authority of Thurrock, also in Essex.

== History ==
=== Early history ===
Modern settlement originated in Anglo-Saxon times when it consisted of Havering Palace and the surrounding lands that belonged to the king. The palace itself is known to have existed since at least the reign of Edward the Confessor when it was one of his primary residences. The area formed a liberty from 1465 which included the parishes of Havering-atte-Bower, Hornchurch and Romford.

The name Havering appears in documents from around the 12th century. The origins of this name have been debated by historians since the Middle Ages when it was linked to the legend of Edward the Confessor and a mystical ring returned to him by Saint John the Apostle. This event has been commemorated in stained glass (from about 1407) in a chapel at Romford dedicated to the king.

=== Settlement ===
London Underground and fast rail services to central London resulted in considerable residential land use mixed with designated parklands and farmland under the planning policy of the predecessor local authorities and current authority during the 20th century and into the early 21st century.

The development of the borough came in two distinct phases. The first middle class suburban developments were built in the late Victorian and Edwardian period. The garden suburbs of Upminster, Emerson Park and Gidea Park (also known as Romford Garden Suburb) were spurred on by the building of the railway lines through Havering from Liverpool Street and Fenchurch Street in the late 19th century.

In the 1930s the District Line was electrified and extended to Upminster with new stations at Elm Park and Upminster Bridge. Also at this time new industries near the area such as the Ford Motor Company plant at Dagenham caused a new wave of mostly working class developments along the route of the new Underground line. In addition to this, to the north of the borough, the large housing estates of Harold Hill and Collier Row were constructed to deal with the chronic housing shortages and early slum clearance programmes in central London.

=== Administrative history ===
The borough was created in 1965 under the London Government Act 1963, covering the combined area of the former Municipal Borough of Romford and Hornchurch Urban District. The area was transferred from Essex to Greater London to become one of the 32 London Boroughs.

Romford had been a local board district from 1851. It was converted into an urban district in 1894, was enlarged in 1934 to take in the neighbouring parishes of Havering-atte-Bower and Noak Hill, and was incorporated to become a municipal borough in 1937.

The parish of Hornchurch had been made an urban district in 1926, which was enlarged in 1934 to take in the parishes of Cranham, Great Warley, Rainham, Upminster and Wennington.

The new borough was named after the former Royal Liberty of Havering, which had covered a similar area.

== Districts ==
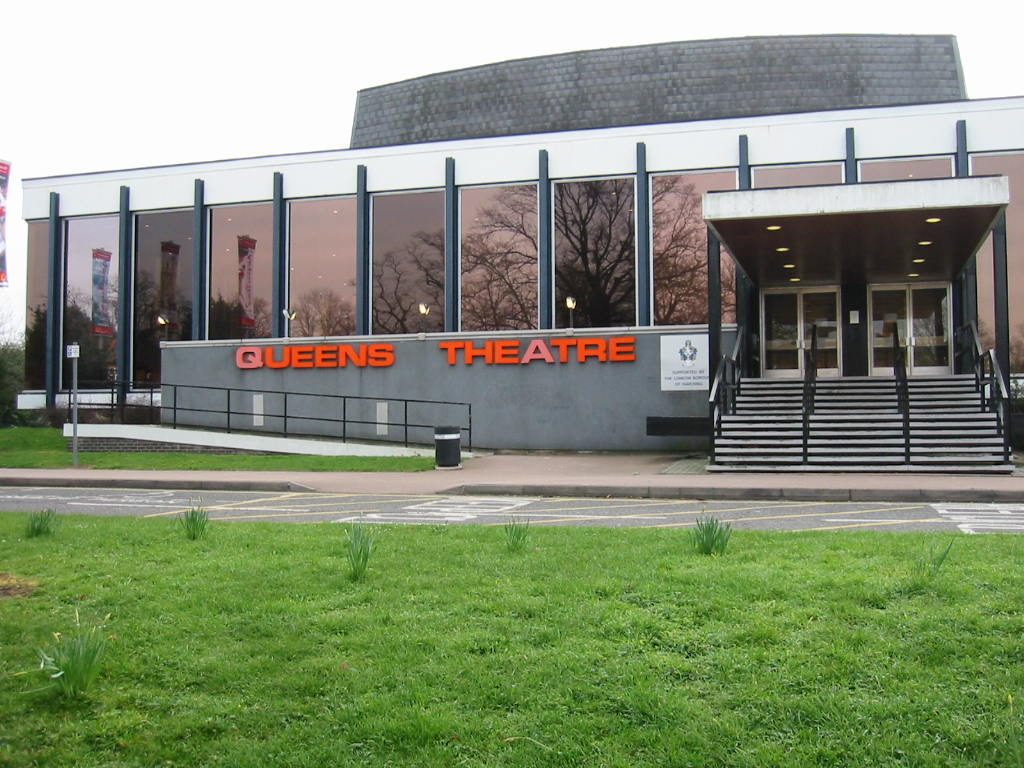
Queen's Theatre, Hornchurch

This pattern of the 'garden suburb' with inter- and post-war private housing developments occurred widely across the borough, with small estates of social housing representing a low percentage of housing in any single council ward; six of the 30 electoral wards with fewer than 2% social housing are in the borough: Hylands, Mawneys, Pettits, Hacton and the two wards forming Upminster, Cranham and Upminster Ward. Plans to extend existing developments in much of the borough are blocked as open land is protected as part of the Metropolitan Green Belt. In contrast, the southern part of Havering adjacent to the Thames is within the London Riverside section of the Thames Gateway redevelopment area. New open spaces and large scale house building to provide an entirely new residential community is planned.

The most built-up areas are the traditional garden suburb districts of Hornchurch, Emerson Park, Gidea Park, Harold Wood, Romford and Upminster. These places have developed over the last hundred years to form a large area of continuous urban sprawl with indistinct boundaries.

A 2017 study found that, when comparing low-end rent to low-end earnings, private rented housing in Havering is the most affordable of any London borough.

Named neighbourhoods are the developments of Ardleigh Green, Chase Cross, Collier Row, Elm Park, Harold Hill, Rainham. The borough's exurbs with green buffers of farmland or parkland are:

- Havering-atte-Bower
- North Ockendon
- Noak Hill
- Wennington

== Governance ==
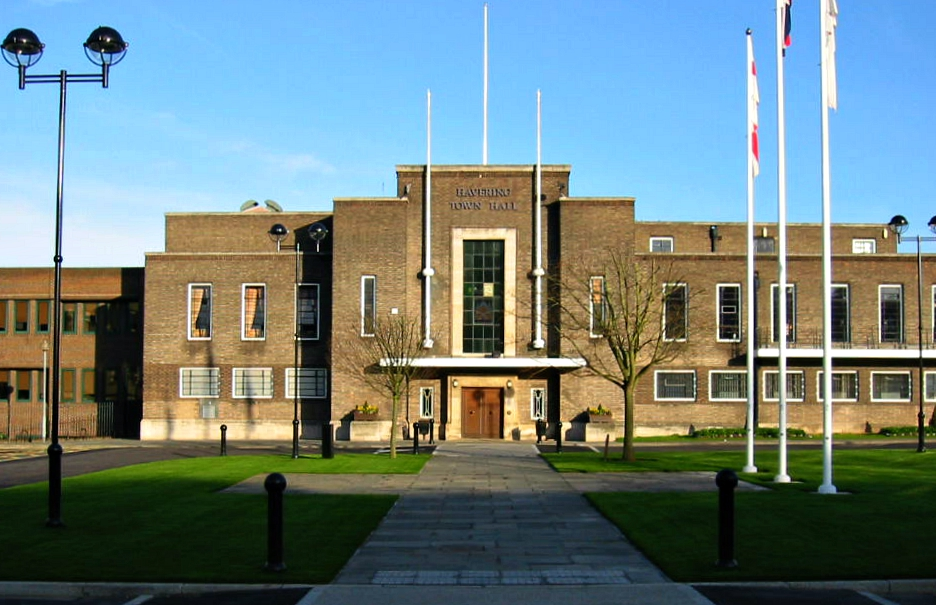
Havering Town Hall

The local authority is Havering Council, based at Havering Town Hall (formerly Romford Town Hall) in Romford.

A map showing the wards of Havering since 2022

Havering elects 55 councillors from 20 wards:

1. Beam Park (2)
2. Cranham (3)
3. Elm Park (3)
4. Emerson Park (2)
5. Gooshays (3)
6. Hacton (2)
7. Harold Wood (3)
8. Havering-atte-Bower (3)
9. Heaton (3)
10. Hylands & Harrow Lodge (3)
11. Marshalls & Rise Park (3)
12. Mawneys (3)
13. Rainham & Wennington (3)
14. Rush Green & Crowlands (3)
15. South Hornchurch (2)
16. Squirrels Heath (3)
17. St Alban's (2)
18. St Andrew's (3)
19. St Edward's (3)
20. Upminster (3)

=== Greater London representation ===
For elections to the Greater London Council, the borough formed the Havering electoral division, electing three members. In 1973 it was divided into the single-member Hornchurch, Romford and Upminster electoral divisions. The Greater London Council was abolished in 1986.

Since 2000, for elections to the London Assembly, the borough forms part of the Havering and Redbridge constituency.

=== UK Parliament ===
Until 2010 the borough was split between the parliamentary constituencies of Hornchurch, Romford and Upminster with the three constituencies entirely within the borough. At the 2010 general election, the boundaries of these constituencies changed to a new Hornchurch and Upminster constituency and Rainham became part of the new cross-borough Dagenham and Rainham constituency.

== Demography ==
Population pyramid of the Borough of Havering

In 2011, the borough had a population of 237,232 over 43 square miles (111.4 km^{2}). Havering has a lower population density than other London Boroughs as large areas are parkland and 23 square miles (60 km^{2}) (more than half the borough) is Metropolitan Green Belt protected land. Those areas of development are extensive but rarely intensive. It has, at 4.5%, a below average unemployment rate for Greater London, and one of the lowest crime rates.

Havering has a significantly higher proportion of residents in white ethnic groups than other outer London boroughs (87.7% – 2011 census). The Black African population is the most significant minority ethnic group in Havering (3.2%). The Upminster ward of the borough is the third least ethnically diverse in Greater London, with a Simpson's diversity index of 1.10.

=== Ethnicity ===
Ethnic makeup of Havering by single year ages in 2021

Ethnic demography of the London Borough of Havering over time

Ethnic group	Year											
Ethnic group	1971 estimations		1981 estimations		1991 census		2001 census		2011 census		2021 census	
White: Total	–	99.1%	232,585	97.6%	222,168	96.8%	213,421	95.2%	207,949	87.7%	197,314	75.3%
White: British	–	–	–	–	–	–	206,365	92%	197,615	83.3%	174,232	66.5%
White: Irish	–	–	–	–	–	–	3,390	1.5%	2,989	1.3%	2,894	1.1%
White: Gypsy or Irish Traveller	–	–	–	–	–	–	–	–	160	–	259	0.1%
White: Roma	–	–	–	–	–	–	–	–	–	–	433	0.2%
White: Other	–	–	–	–	–	–	3,666	1.6%	7,185	3%	19,496	7.4%
Asian or Asian British: Total	–	–	–	–	4,266	1.85%	4,974	2.2%	11,545	4.8%	28,150	10.8%
Asian or Asian British: Indian	–	–	–	–	2,437	1.1%	2,756	1.2%	5,017	2.1%	11,292	4.3%
Asian or Asian British: Pakistani	–	–	–	–	369	0.2%	457	0.2%	1,492	0.6%	5,683	2.2%
Asian or Asian British: Bangladeshi	–	–	–	–	181	–	216	–	975	0.4%	4,774	1.8%
Asian or Asian British: Chinese	–	–	–	–	822	0.3%	886	0.4%	1,459	0.6%	2,011	0.8%
Asian or Asian British: Other Asian	–	–	–	–	457	0.2%	659	0.3%	2,602	1.1%	4,390	1.7%
Black or Black British: Total	–	–	–	–	2,166	0.94%	3,139	1.4%	11,481	4.8%	21,567	8.2%
Black or Black British: African	–	–	–	–	392	0.2%	1,377	0.6%	7,581	3.2%	14,138	5.4%
Black or Black British: Caribbean	–	–	–	–	1,297	0.6%	1,554	0.7%	2,885	1.2%	4,832	1.8%
Black or Black British: Other Black	–	–	–	–	477	0.2%	208	–	1,015	0.4%	2,597	1.0%
Mixed or British Mixed: Total	–	–	–	–	–	–	2,298	1%	4,933	2.1%	9,747	3.7%
Mixed: White and Black Caribbean	–	–	–	–	–	–	827	0.4%	1,970	0.8%	3,224	1.2%
Mixed: White and Black African	–	–	–	–	–	–	226	0.1%	712	0.3%	1,535	0.6%
Mixed: White and Asian	–	–	–	–	–	–	705	0.3%	1,154	0.5%	2,344	0.9%
Mixed: Other Mixed	–	–	–	–	–	–	540	0.2%	1,097	0.5%	2,644	1.0%
Other: Total	–	–	–	–	892	0.38%	416	0.2%	1,324	0.6%	5,274	2%
Other: Arab	–	–	–	–	–	–	–	–	311	0.1%	809	0.3%
Other: Any other ethnic group	–	–	–	–	892	0.38%	416	0.2%	1,013	0.4%	4465	1.7%
Ethnic minority: Total	–	0.9%	5,662	2.4%	7,324	3.17%	10,827	5.8%	29,283	12.3	64,738	24.7%
Total	–	100%	238,247	100%	229,492	100%	224,248	100%	237,232	100%	262,052	100%

=== Religion ===
Religious makeup of Havering by single year age groups in 2021

Religious identity of residents residing in Havering
Religion	2021	
Religion	Number	%
Christian	136,765	52.2
Muslim	16,135	6.2
Jewish	1,305	0.5
Hindu	6,454	2.5
Sikh	4,498	1.7
Buddhism	1,092	0.4
Other religion	1,056	0.4
No religion	80,235	30.6
Religion not stated	14,512	5.5
Total	262,052	100.0

=== Immigration ===
This list includes top-15 sources of immigration to Havering for 2021 census:

#	Country	Number
1	Romania	5,393
2	India	4,603
3	Nigeria	4,137
4	Lithuania	2,841
5	Pakistan	2,505
6	Ireland	2,082
7	Bangladesh	1,910
8	Poland	1,868
9	Moldova	1,769
10	Ghana	1,246
11	Bulgaria	1,172
12	Philippines	1,138
13	Albania	935
14	Sri Lanka	764
15	Italy	752

Population census
Year	Pop.	±%
1801	6,370	—
1811	7,028	+10.3%
1821	8,198	+16.6%
1831	9,036	+10.2%
1841	10,696	+18.4%
1851	11,492	+7.4%
1861	12,850	+11.8%
1871	14,208	+10.6%
1881	15,566	+9.6%
1891	19,041	+22.3%
1901	24,853	+30.5%
1911	32,439	+30.5%
1921	49,681	+53.2%
1931	76,092	+53.2%
1941	119,292	+56.8%
1951	187,022	+56.8%
1961	215,404	+15.2%
1971	248,107	+15.2%
1981	239,769	−3.4%
1991	232,491	−3.0%
2001	224,248	−3.5%
2011	237,232	+5.8%
2021	262,052	+10.5%
2024 estimate	276,274	+5.4%
Note: 2024 estimate

== Economy ==
There are over 7,000 businesses based in Havering. Romford is the main commercial hub of the borough with a small district of mainly office development close to the railway station. There is also some industry to the south between Rainham and the River Thames such as Rainham Steel headquarters on the boundary of Elm Park. Light industry elsewhere in the borough has been in decline, with major employers such as the former Star Brewery now closed down. New industrial development in the south of the borough has been encouraged by the London Development Agency (now GLA Land and Property), with the opening of the Centre for Engineering and Manufacturing Excellence.

The main retail district is also located in Romford with several interconnected or neighbouring shopping arcades including the Liberty Shopping Centre, the Mercury Mall, and the Brewery. Romford Market is located to the north of Romford and is the largest market within the borough and in the surrounding area. Hornchurch and Upminster are the other main retail centres with extensive high street shopping areas.

Romford has a developed night-time economy with one of the highest concentrations of bars and nightclubs anywhere in Greater London outside the West End with public transport radiating into all parts of the borough.

Havering London Borough Council applied to the Government to allow a 'super-casino' to be built in the south of the borough, however the application was rejected in May 2006.

== Transport ==
=== Roads ===
The M25 motorway forms part of the borough boundary to the east with North Ockendon the only settlement to fall outside. The A12 (near Romford) and the A13 (near Rainham) are the main trunk radial routes from central London and are located to the north and south of the borough respectively. The A127 trunk route to Southend begins at Gallows Corner; which also forms the eastern end of the A118 local artery from Stratford. The A124 local artery from Canning Town terminates at Upminster.

London Underground stations in Havering

=== Public transport ===
The District line of the London Underground runs roughly east–west through the middle of the borough and there is an extensive network of London bus routes, linking all districts to Romford and other places beyond the borough. The London, Tilbury & Southend line (operated by c2c) passes through the borough in two places and the Great Eastern Main Line (GEML) passes through the north of the borough serving Romford, Gidea Park and Harold Wood. Elizabeth line runs stopping services via the GEML, and Greater Anglia operate non-stop services running straight through these stations. There is also a branch line from Romford to Upminster which is currently operated by the London Overground's Liberty line There are proposals for transport improvements in the south of the borough where the population is expected to rise.

==== Modernisation of railway transport in Havering ====
In May 2015, stopping services operated by Abellio Greater Anglia at the time, were replaced by Transport for London's new railway service, TfL Rail. These services ran new Class 345 trains, and occasionally some older Class 315 services. In May 2022, TfL Rail was rebranded as Elizabeth line, and all Class 315 trains were scrapped.

=== Travel to work ===
In March 2011, the main forms of transport that residents used to travel to work were: driving a car or van, 31.8% of all residents aged 16–74; train, 11.9%; underground, metro, light rail, tram, 6.3%; bus, minibus or coach, 5.1%; on foot, 4.1%; work mainly at or from home, 2.4%; passenger in a car or van, 2.1%.

== Media ==
The local newspapers in Havering are The Havering Daily and the Romford Recorder.

Bedrock Radio is a charity run community health & Hospital radio station located within the Queen's Hospital in Romford.

The first Hospital Radio Service In Havering began broadcasting in 1964 as Harold Wood Radio. Today, Bedrock Radio serves the community by broadcasting online and to Queen's, King George & Goodmayes Hospitals and features information about the Hospitals, NHS services, promotes charitable and community organisations and has an extensive local events guide featuring community non-profit events. Bedrock Radio also provide local news on-air covering East London and South Essex, the station has announced it will launch on a local DAB+ later in 2025.

Time 107.5 FM was the commercial radio station broadcasting to Havering and surrounding areas and features local news, Time FM closed on 1 August 2025 becoming part of Nation Radio London.

== Places of interest ==
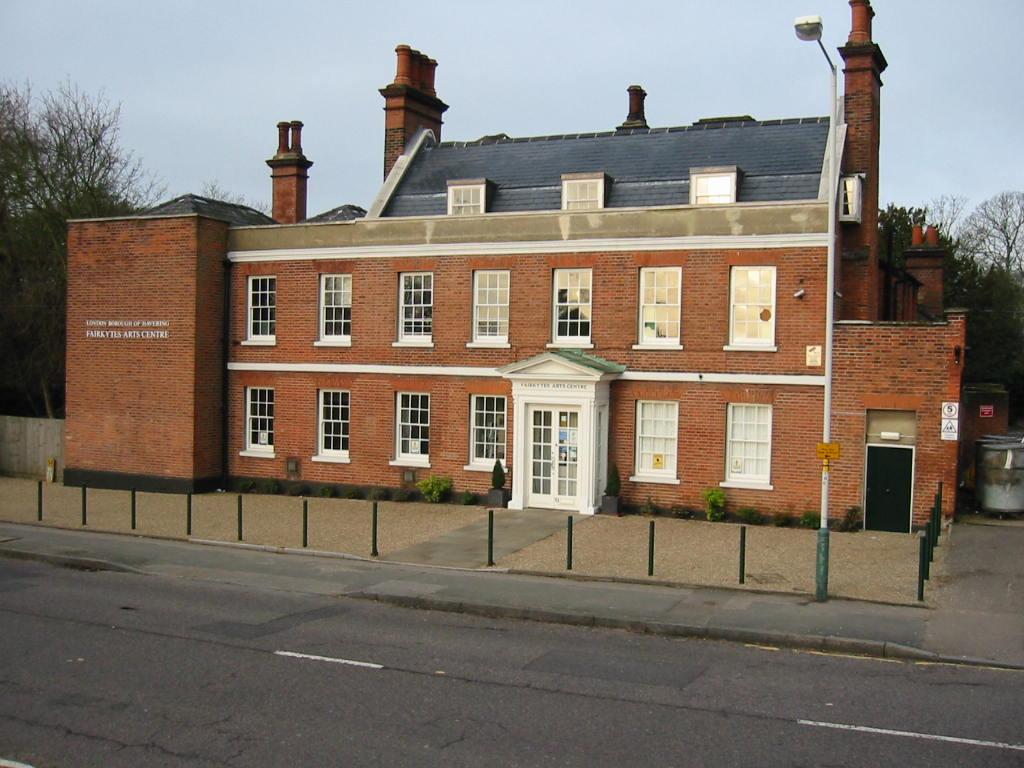
Fairkytes Arts Centre in Hornchurch is operated by Havering Council.

- The Diver
- Brookside Theatre
- Langtons
- Liberty Shopping Centre
- Queen's Theatre
- RAF Hornchurch Heritage Centre
- Rainham Hall – National Trust house in Rainham
- Romford Market
- Romford Garden Suburb
- Upminster Windmill
- Upminster Tithe Barn

== Sport and leisure ==
The London Borough of Havering has several sporting clubs:

- Football
  - Romford F.C., a non-League football club who play at Rookery Hill, Corringham
  - A.F.C. Hornchurch, a non-League football club who play at Hornchurch Stadium
- Ice hockey
  - Romford Raiders, an ice hockey team who play at Romford Ice Arena
- Field hockey
  - Havering Hockey Club, who play at Campion School

== Twinning ==
Havering is twinned with:

- Ludwigshafen, Germany
- Hesdin, France

== Education ==
The Borough is the education authority for the district providing education in a mix of foundation, community and voluntary aided schools. There are also a number of academies.

Havering Adult College provides part-time day, evening and weekend adult education (19+) from sites throughout the borough. Havering Sixth Form College provides sixth form education for pupils of borough schools as well as those who are resident in the borough. Havering College of Further and Higher Education provides part-time and full-time education to students aged 14+.

A 2017 study by Trust for London and the New Policy Institute found that 52% of adults in Havering lack Level 3 Qualifications (A Level equivalent) – the worst level of any London borough. 44% of 19 year olds in Havering also lacked these qualifications – the second worst level in the capital.

== Health Care ==
The Borough of Havering is serviced by The Barking Havering and Redbridge University Hospitals NHS Trust.

Provisions of Accident and Emergency from Queens Hospital, Romford. During the 2019/2020 financial year Queens hospital received 309,551 patients into the A&E department.

== See also ==
- List of people from Havering
