= King's Wood =

King's Wood may refer to

in England

- King's Wood, Heath and Reach, Bedfordshire
- King's Wood, part of the King's Wood and Urchin Wood SSSI, North Somerset
- King's Wood School, Harold Hill, Essex
- King's Wood, a forest near Molash, Kent
- King's Wood, a wood at Micklefield, High Wycombe, Buckinghamshire
- King's Wood, Corby, a local nature reserve in Northamptonshire
- King's Wood, on the Trentham Estate, Staffordshire and part of the King's and Hargreaves Woods SSSI

other things

- King's Wood Symphony, a musical composition

== See also ==
- Kingswood (disambiguation)
