= Kingswood School (disambiguation) =

Kingswood School may refer to

in Burma

- Kingswood High School, Kalaw

in England

- Kingswood House School, Epsom, Surrey
- Kingswood School, Bath, Somerset
- The Kingswood School, former name of Kingswood Secondary Academy, Northamptonshire
- King's Wood School, Essex

in Canada

- Kingswood Drive Public School, an elementary school in Brampton, Ontario
- Kingswood Elementary School (British Columbia), an elementary school in Richmond
- Kingswood Elementary School (Nova Scotia), an elementary school in Hammonds Plains

in the United States

- Cranbrook Kingswood School, a private K-12 college preparatory school in Bloomfield Hills, Michigan
- Kingswood-Oxford School, West Hartford, Connecticut

== See also ==
- Kingswood Academy (disambiguation)
- Kingswood College (disambiguation)
- Kingswood (disambiguation)
