= Kingswood College =

Kingswood College may refer to:

- Kingswood College (Box Hill), Victoria, Australia
- Kingswood College (Doncaster), Victoria, Australia
- Kingswood College (South Africa)
- Kingswood College (Sri Lanka)
- The former name of Scarisbrick Hall School, Lancashire, England
- A Kingswood College existed in Kingswood, Kentucky from 1906 to 1934

== See also ==
- Kingswood School (disambiguation)
- Kingswood Academy (disambiguation)
- Kingswood (disambiguation)
