= Kingswood Academy =

Kingswood Academy may refer to:

- Kingswood Academy, Hull, East Riding of Yorkshire, England
- Kingswood Secondary Academy, Corby, Northamptonshire, England

== See also ==
- Kingswood School (disambiguation)
- Kingswood College (disambiguation)
- Kingswood (disambiguation)
