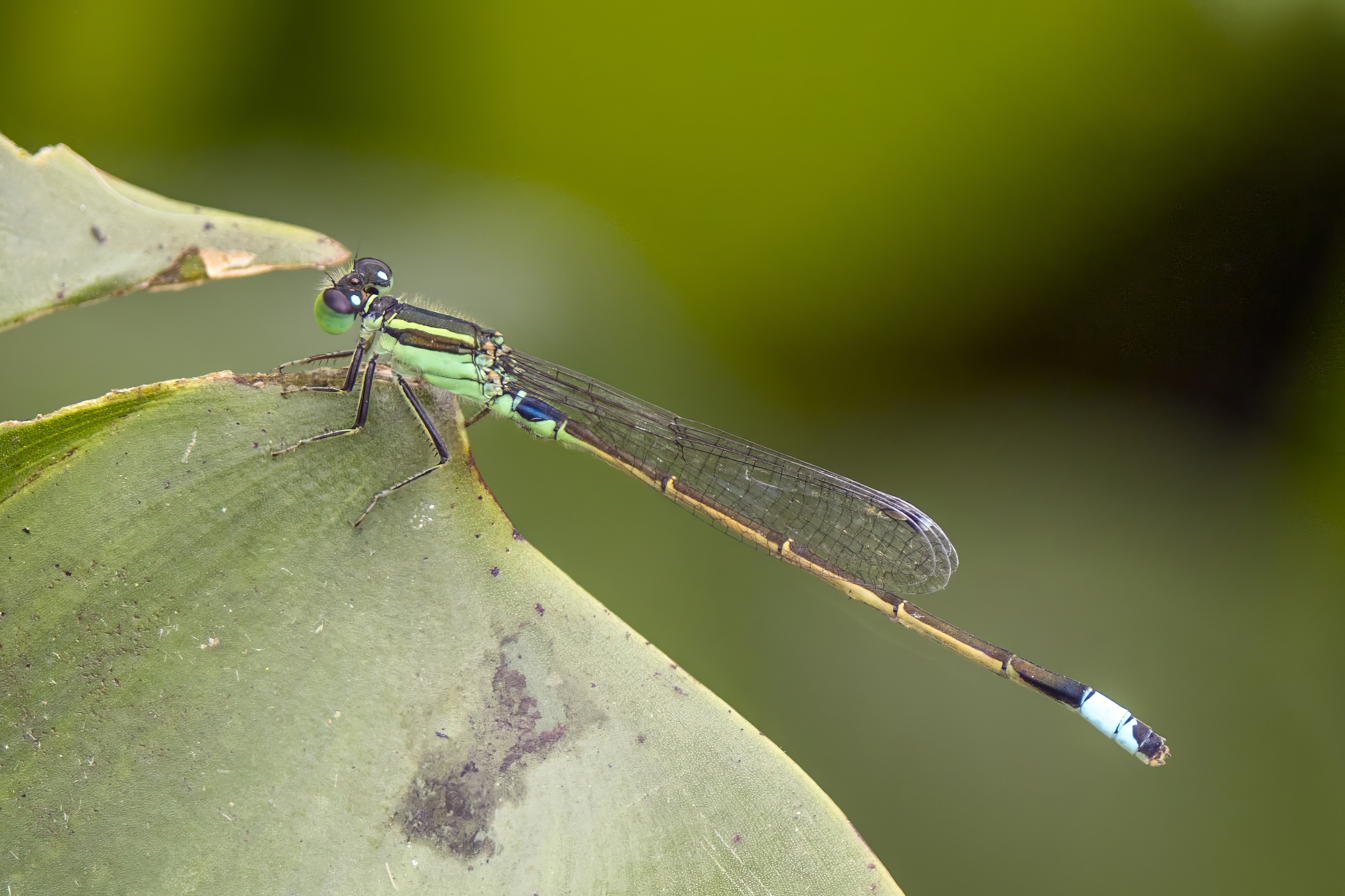
- male
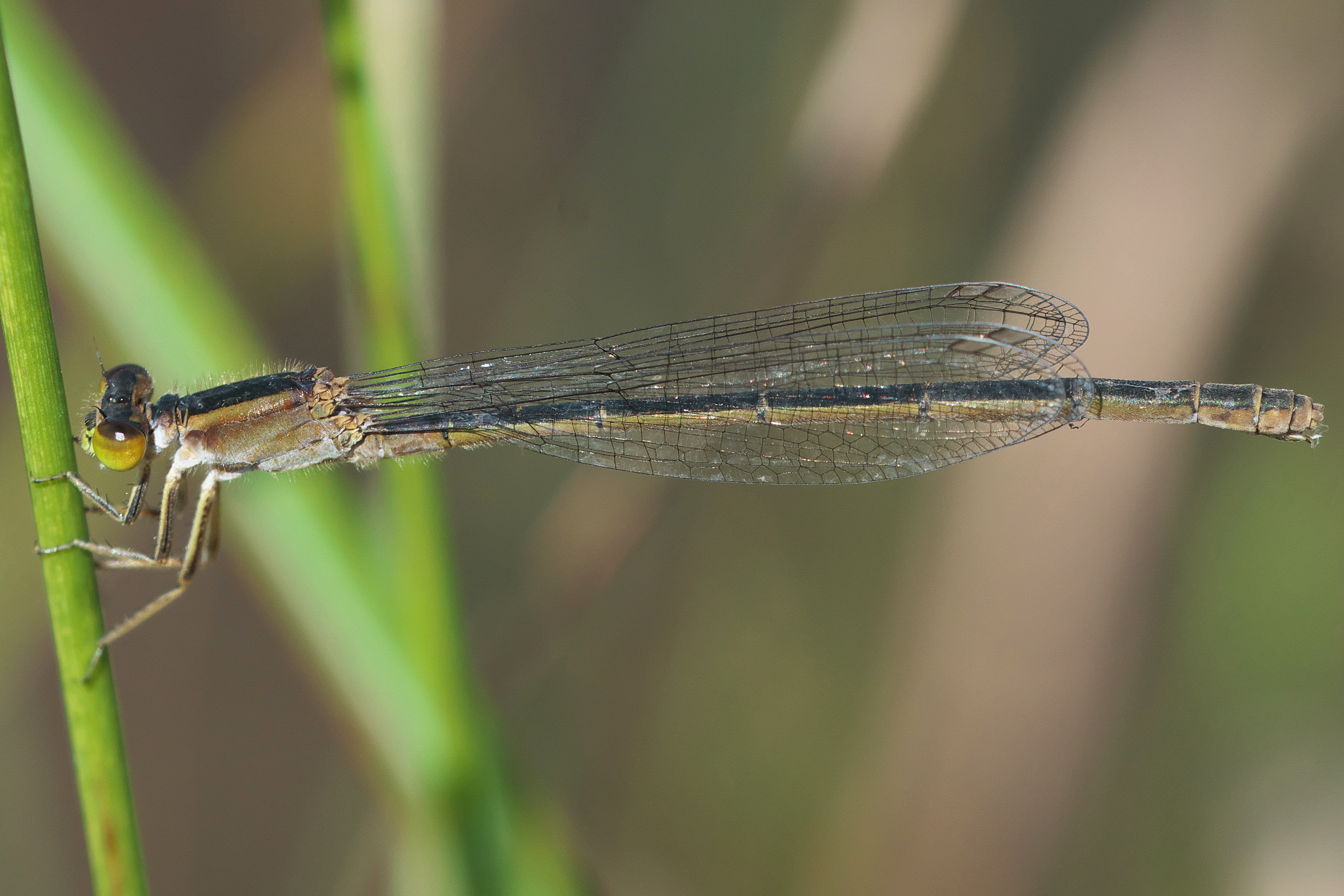
- gynochrome female

Conservation status
- Least Concern (IUCN 3.1)

Scientific classification
- Kingdom: Animalia
- Phylum: Arthropoda
- Clade: Pancrustacea
- Class: Insecta
- Order: Odonata
- Suborder: Zygoptera
- Family: Coenagrionidae
- Genus: Ischnura
- Species: I. senegalensis

Binomial name
- Ischnura senegalensis (Rambur, 1842)

Synonyms
- Agrion senegalense Rambur, 1842; Enallagma brevispina Selys, 1876

= Ischnura senegalensis =

Species of insect

Ischnura senegalensis, also known variously as common bluetail, marsh bluetail, ubiquitous bluetail, African bluetail, and Senegal golden dartlet, is a widespread damselfly of the family Coenagrionidae. It is native from Africa, through the Middle East, to southern and eastern Asia.

== Description and habitat ==
It is a small damselfly with black capped bluish green eyes. Its thorax is black on dorsum and greenish blue on the sides. Its abdomen is black on dorsum up to segment 7. Segments 1 and 2 are greenish blue and 3 to 7 are khaki yellow on the sides. Segments 8 and 9 are azure blue, with 9 black on dorsum. Segment 10 is black on dorsum and khaki yellow on the sides. The green on thorax and abdomen may turn to blue in both male and female when aged.

The females of this species exhibit sexual mimicry. One group mimics the males' colour (androchromes). Other group will have their own female colouration (gynochromes). Androchrom female looks exactly like the male except in sexual characteristics. In gynochrome, the eyes are olive green with orange above. Sides of the thorax is mud colored, will pale when matured. All the abdominal segments are marked with black on dorsum. The lateral sides are khaki yellow. Segments 1–2 and 8–10 have orange color laterally, will fade when matured.

It breeds in marshes, weedy ponds and wetlands.

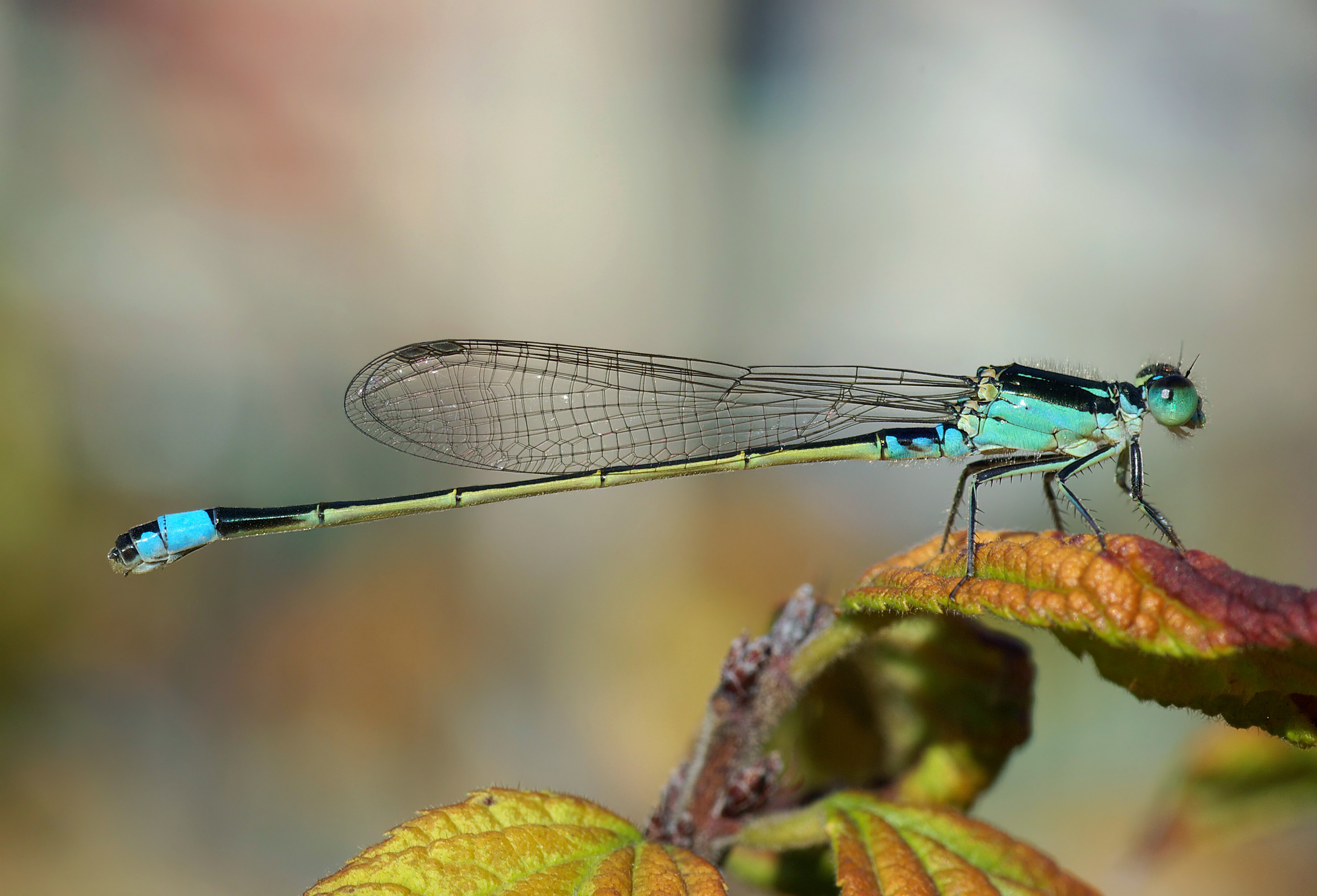
Female with blue thorax (androchrome)

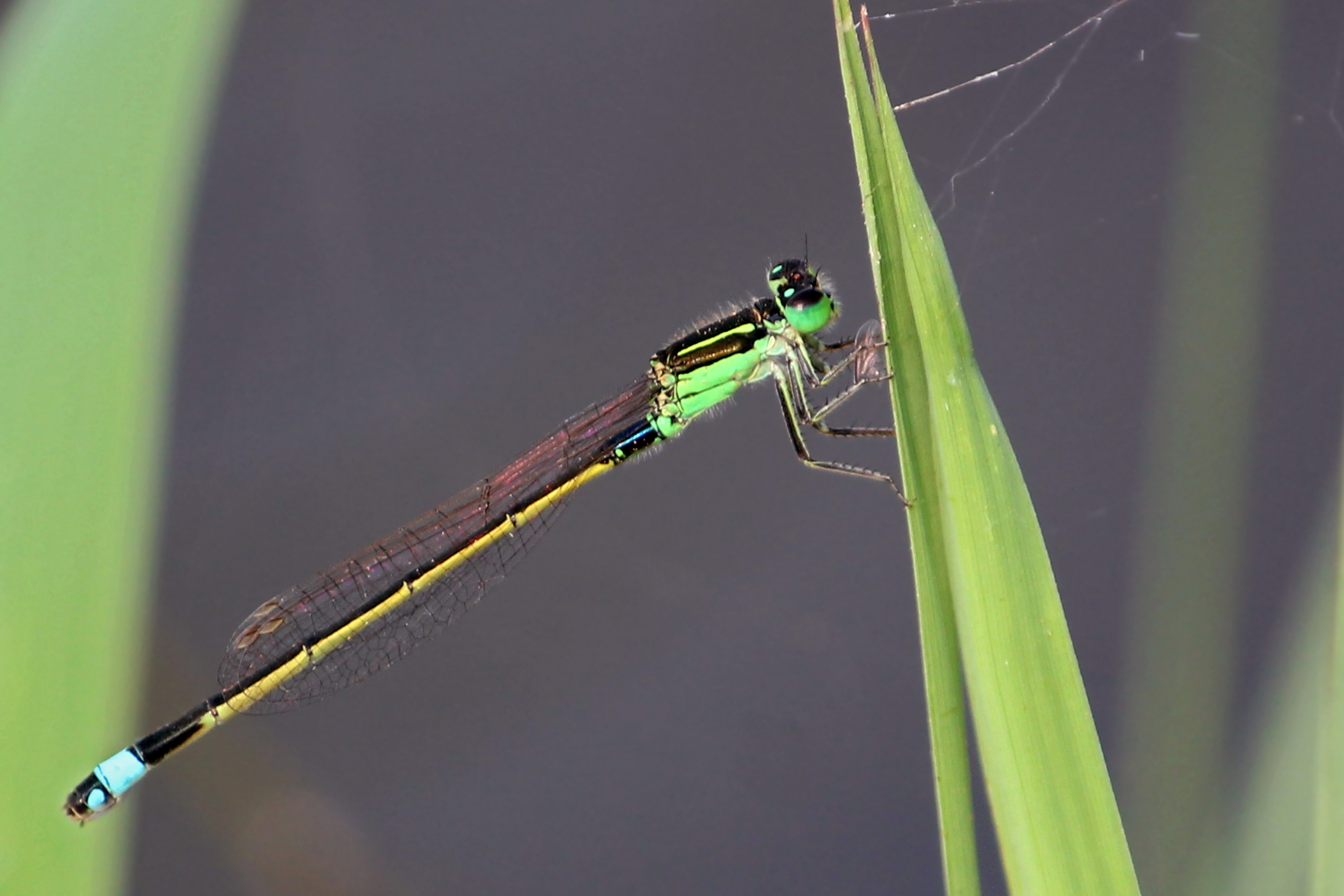
Female with green thorax (androchrome)

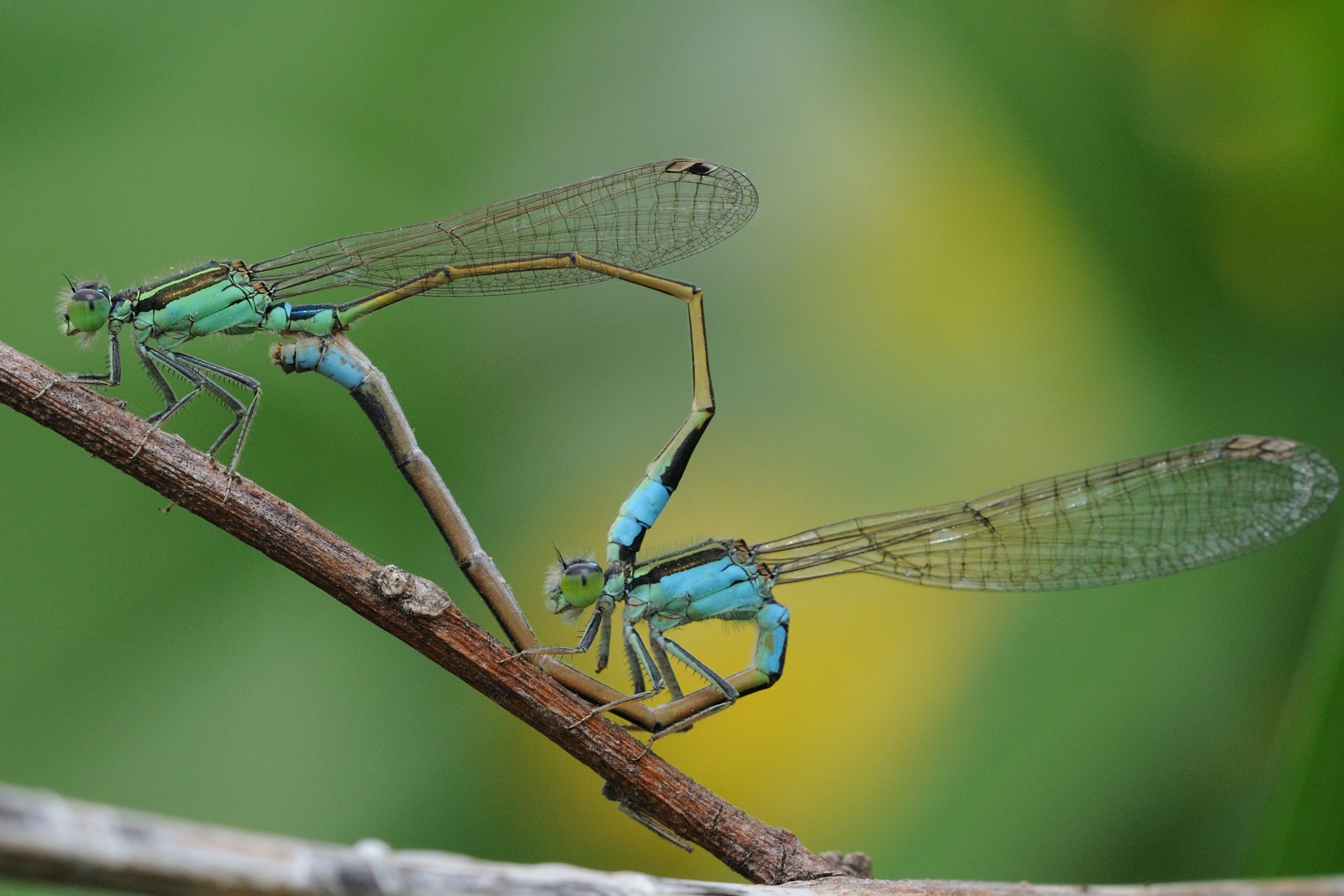
Mating pair (androchrome female)

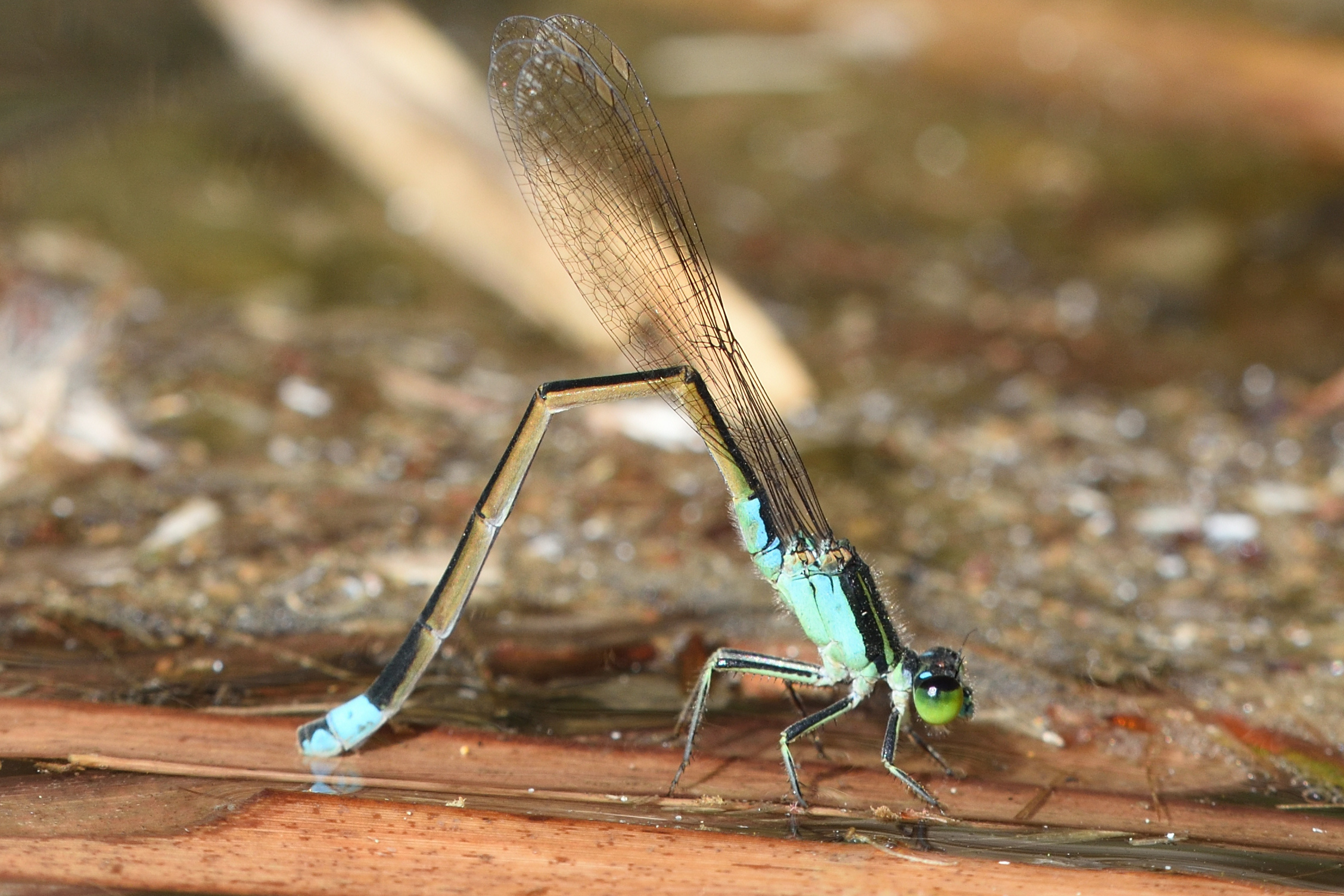
Oviposition (androchrome female)

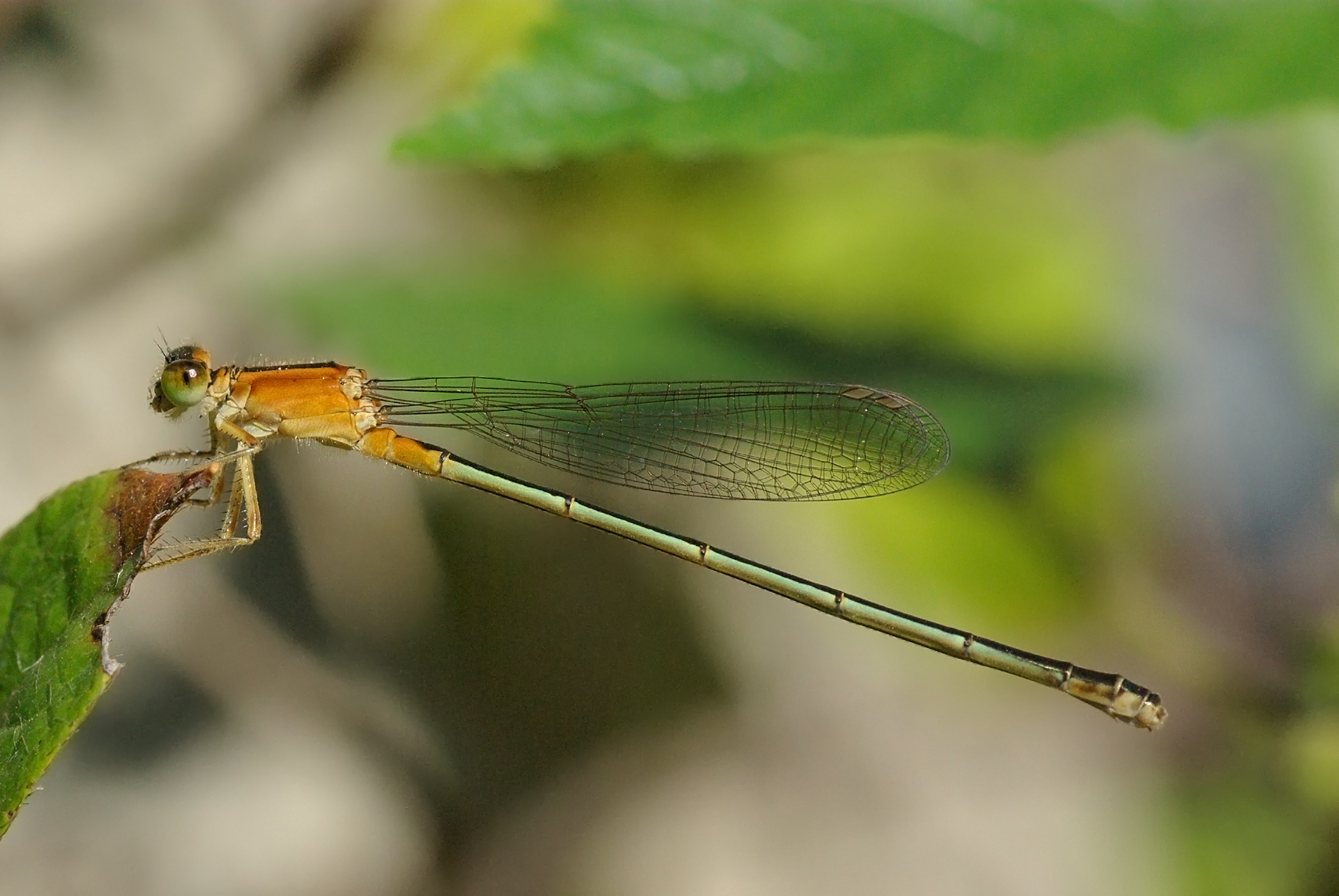
Female (gynochrome, sub-adult)

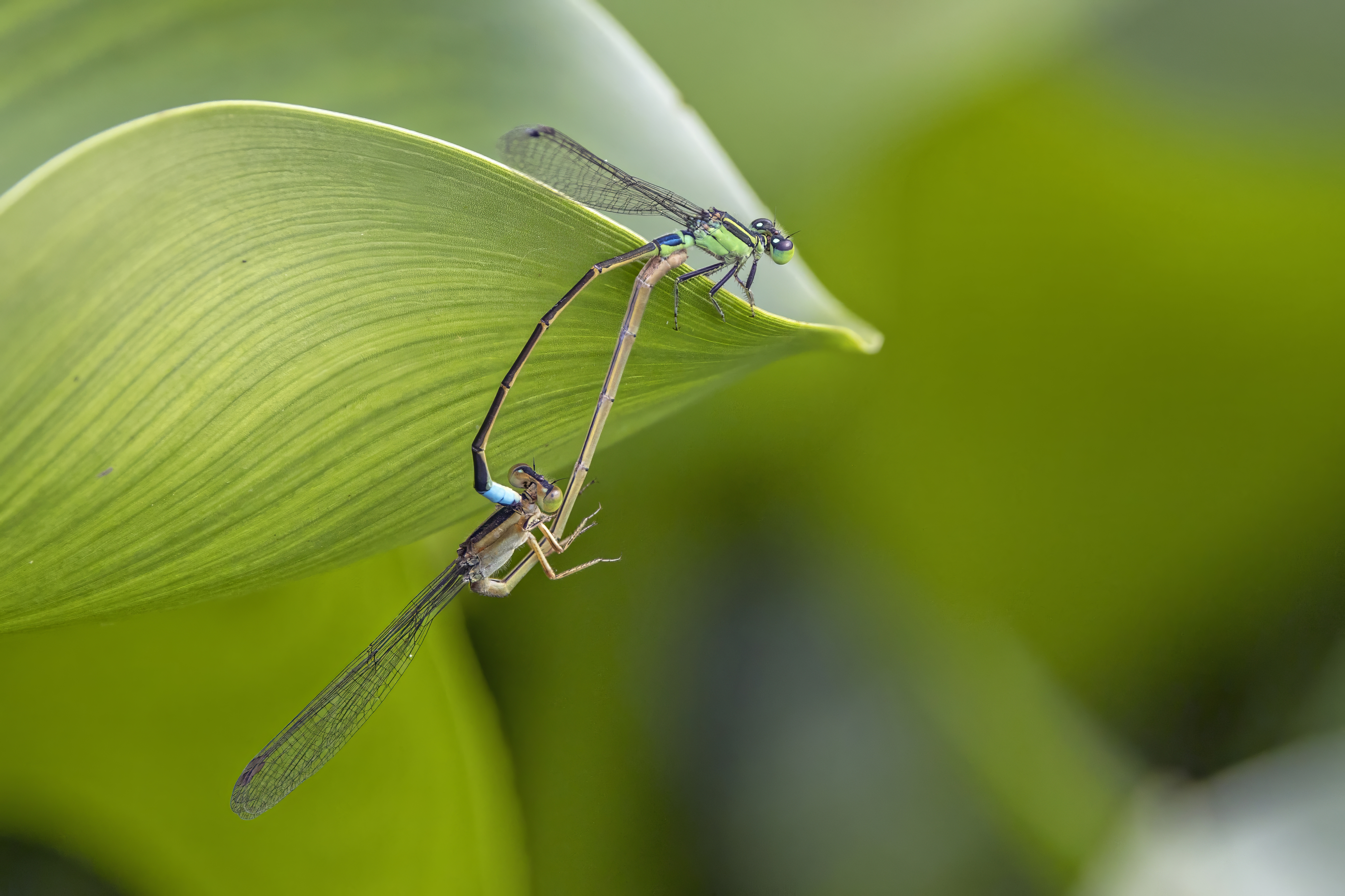
Mating pair (gynochrome female)

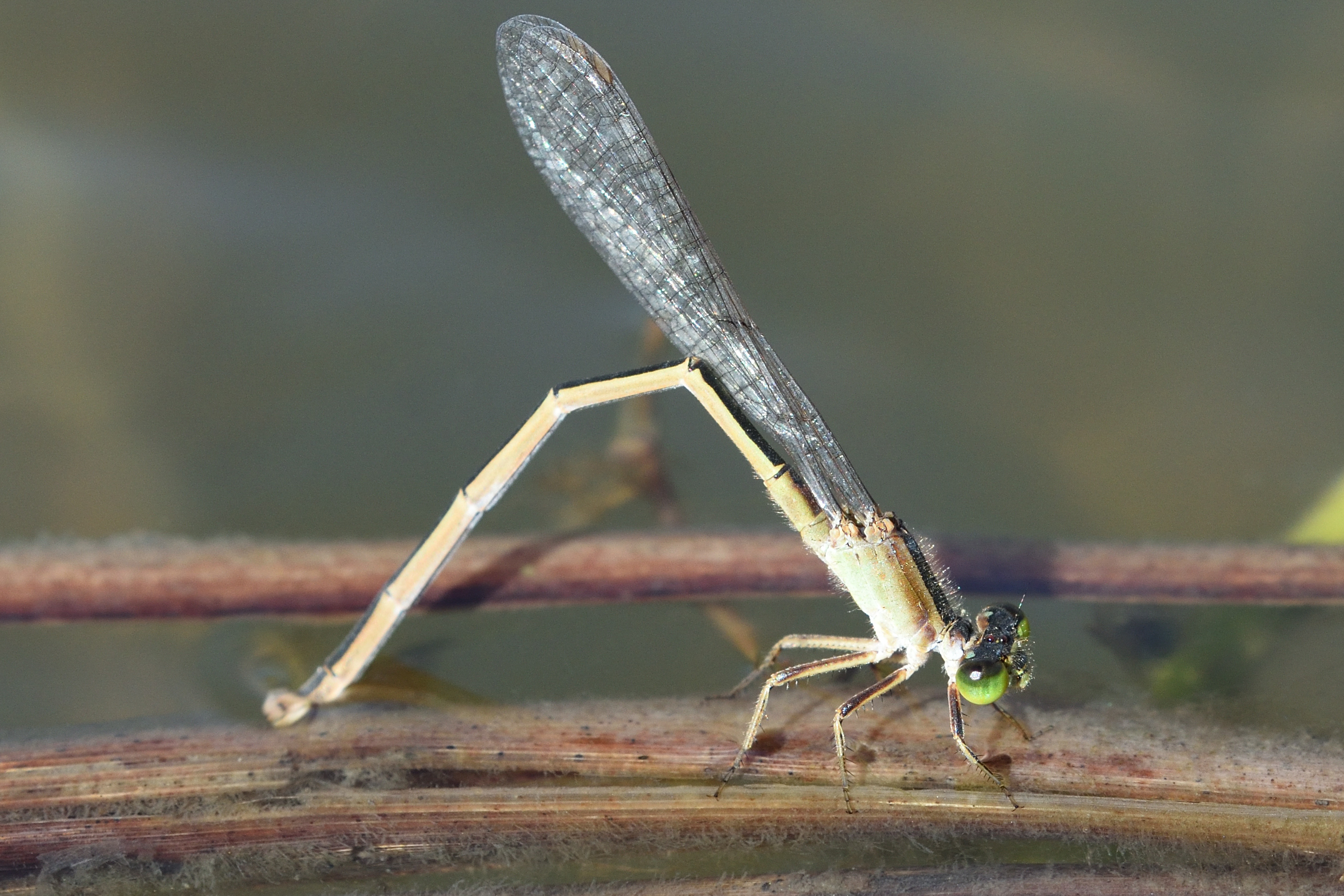
Oviposition (gynochrome female)

== See also ==
- List of odonates of India
- List of odonates of Sri Lanka
- List of odonata of Kerala
