= King's Wood, Corby =

Nature reserve in Northamptonshire, England

Coordinates: 52.475°N 0.728°W

King's Wood
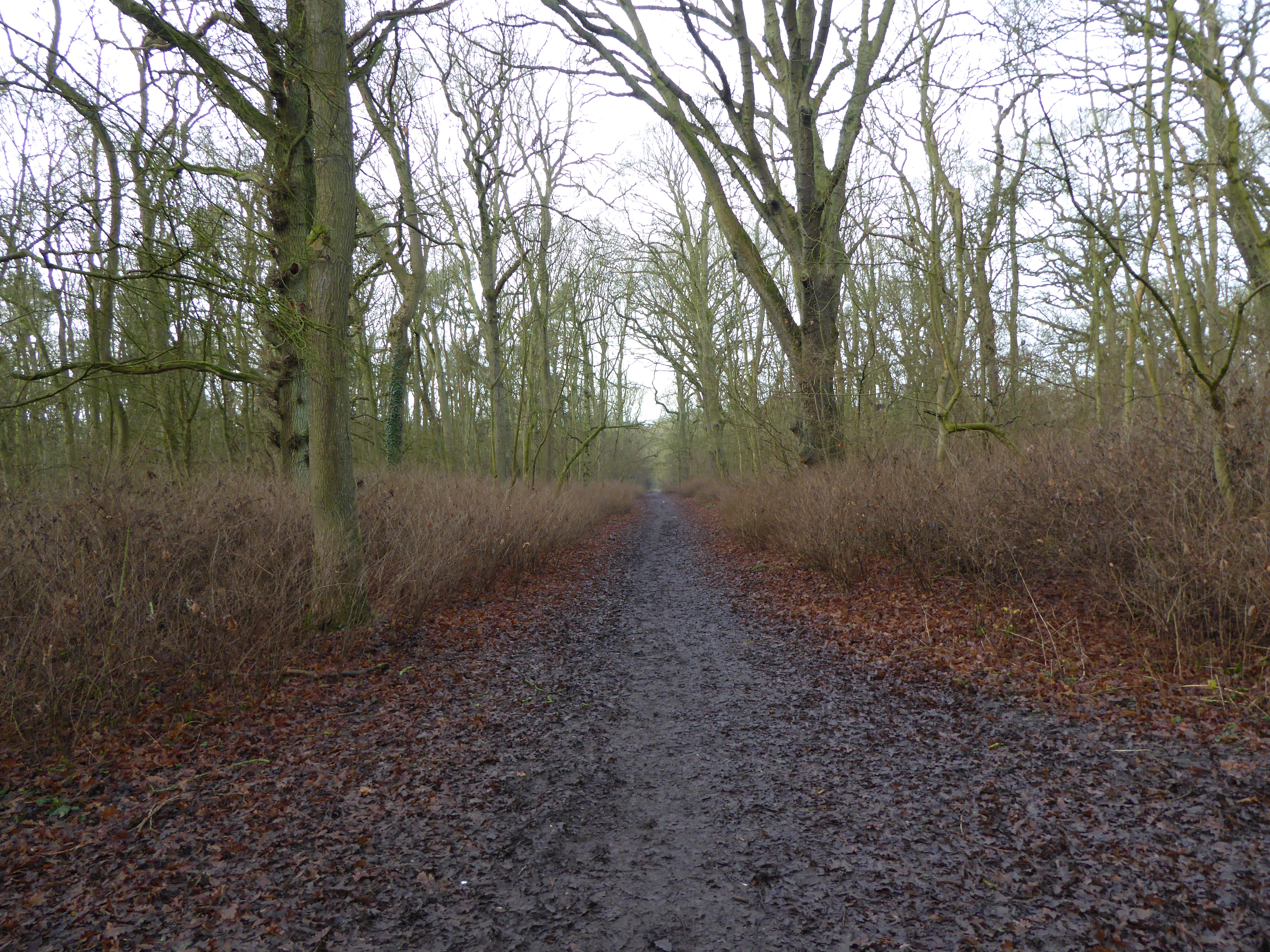
- Interactive map of King's Wood
- Type: Local Nature Reserve
- Location: Corby, Northamptonshire
- OS grid: SP 865 871
- Area: 31.7 hectares (78 acres)
- Manager: Wildlife Trust for Bedfordshire, Cambridgeshire and Northamptonshire

King's Wood is a 31.7 hectare Local Nature Reserve in Corby in Northamptonshire. It managed by the Wildlife Trust for Bedfordshire, Cambridgeshire and Northamptonshire.

It is a remnant of the former royal hunting forest, Rockingham Forest. More than 250 plant species have been recorded, including ones characteristic of ancient woods including yellow archangel and wood anemone. There are diverse invertebrates such as green-veined white butterflies and common blue damselflies, and birds include treecreepers, long-tailed tits, green woodpeckers and tawny owls.

Access points include one at the junction of Danesholme Road and Gainsborough Road.
