= Kingswood =

Kingswood may refer to:

== Places ==
=== Australia ===
- Kingswood, New South Wales
- Kingswood (Tamworth), New South Wales
- Kingswood Park, New South Wales
- Kingswood, South Australia

=== Canada ===
- Kingswood Music Theatre, Vaughan, Ontario
- Kingswood Drive Public School, an elementary school located in Brampton, Ontario
- Kingswood Elementary School (British Columbia), an elementary school in Richmond
- Kingswood Elementary School (Nova Scotia), an elementary school in Hammonds Plains
- Kingswood University (New Brunswick), a private Christian university in Sussex

=== England and Wales ===
- Kingswood, Buckinghamshire
- Kingswood, Cheshire West and Chester, a former civil parish in Runcorn Rural District, Cheshire
- Kingswood, Warrington, a location in the United Kingdom in Cheshire
- Kingswood, Kingston upon Hull, a housing estate in the East Riding of Yorkshire
- Kingswood, Essex, a location in the United Kingdom
- Kingswood, South Gloucestershire, on the outskirts of Bristol
  - Kingswood (UK Parliament constituency)
  - Kingswood Borough, a former borough
- Kingswood, Stroud District, Gloucestershire
  - Kingswood Abbey
- Kingswood, Herefordshire, a location in the United Kingdom
- Kingswood, Hertfordshire, a location in the United Kingdom
- Kingswood, Kent
- Kingswood, Powys, a location in the United Kingdom
- Kingswood, Somerset
- Kingswood, Surrey
- Kingswood, Warwickshire
- Kingswood House
- Kingswood Estate

=== Ireland ===
- Kingswood, Dublin, a suburb
  - Kingswood Luas stop, a tram stop

=== United States ===
- Kingswood, Kentucky

== Motor vehicles ==
- Chevrolet Kingswood, a station-wagon automobile manufactured from 1959 to 1972
  - Chevrolet Kingswood Estate, a premium variation of the Chevrolet Kingswood, manufactured from 1969 to 1972
- Holden Kingswood, an automobile manufactured in various forms from 1968 to 1984

== Media and entertainment ==
- Kingswood Country, an Australian sitcom, screened from 1980 to 1984
- Kingswood, a song by the Vasco Era
- Kingswood (band), an Australian indie rock band

== See also ==
- King's Wood (disambiguation)
- Kingwood (disambiguation)
- Kingswood Academy (disambiguation)
- Kingswood College (disambiguation)
- Kingswood School (disambiguation)
- Royal forest (also known as kingswood)
