= Harold Hill =

Coordinates: 51.6100°N 0.2322°E

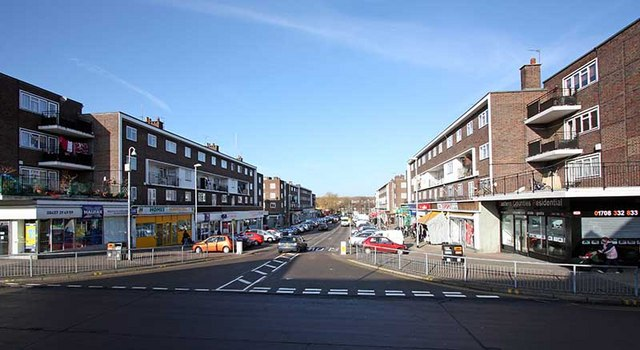
- View from St George's Church, Chippenham Road, Harold Hill

- Location within Greater London
- OS grid reference: TQ545925
  - Charing Cross: 16.6 mi (26.7 km) WSW
- London borough: Havering
- Ceremonial county: Greater London
- Region: London
- Country: England
- Sovereign state: United Kingdom
- Post town: ROMFORD
- Postcode district: RM3
- Dialling code: 01708
- Police: Metropolitan
- Fire: London
- Ambulance: London
- UK Parliament: Hornchurch and Upminster
- London Assembly: Havering and Redbridge

Harold Hill is a suburban area in the London Borough of Havering, East London. 16.6 miles (26.7 km) northeast of Charing Cross. It is a district centre in the London Plan. The name refers to King Harold II, who held the manor of Havering-atte-Bower, and who was killed at the Battle of Hastings in 1066. The suburb is peripheral to London, forming an eastern edge of the urban sprawl.

The extensive London County Council housing development of Harold Hill was conceived in the Greater London Plan of 1944 in order to alleviate housing shortages in Inner London. Before construction of the estate, which was completed in 1958, it was the location of Dagnam Park house and grounds, and in the Municipal Borough of Romford and the county of Essex, but was transferred to Greater London in 1965. The first Greater London Council tenant to buy their council house did so here in 1967. The area is part of a long-term regeneration project led by Havering London Borough Council.

== History ==
=== Local government ===
The area that became Harold Hill formed part of the Harold Wood and Noak Hill wards of the parish of Hornchurch; the large ancient parish occupied the same area as the royal manor and liberty of Havering. The boundary between Harold Wood and Noak Hill was formed by a tributary of the River Ingrebourne. In the Harold Hill area the manor was subdivided into Dagnams, Cockerells and Gooshays. The Havering courts and Romford vestry were the principal local government in the area. The Havering liberty was abolished in 1892 and the vestry in 1894. Following the Local Government Act 1894 the area was split between the parishes of Romford Rural (in the west) and Noak Hill (in the east), each with a parish council and within the Romford Rural District. In 1900 the Romford Rural parish was abolished and the area was then split between the Romford Urban District (in the west) and Noak Hill in Romford Rural District (in the east). In 1934 Romford Urban District absorbed Noak Hill, bringing the whole area under the authority of Romford Urban District Council. Romford was incorporated as a municipal borough in 1937 governed by Romford Borough Council, which was the local authority during the construction of the estate. The Municipal Borough of Romford was abolished in 1965 and Harold Hill became part of the London Borough of Havering in Greater London.

=== Urban development ===
Harold Hill was a planned community, conceived as part of the Greater London Plan in 1944 as a satellite town on the edge of the built up area. (Note: New towns by contrast were planned to be further away from London and provide more diverse development.)

Land for the estate, which consisted of the remaining 850 acres (340 hectares) of Dagnams, was purchased in 1947 by the London County Council. The rest of Dagnams had been sold off in 1919, with the land used for the estate consisting of parkland, woodland, and farmland. The area was within the designated Metropolitan Green Belt, but an exception was made for the development because of the exceptional housing need in London following the Second World War.

Reflecting the urgency of the problem, housing was initially prefabricated. Construction of 7,631 permanent homes, housing 25,000 people, began in 1948 and was complete by 1958. The development is fairly low density with large sections of parkland retained in the centre and edges of the estate. The estate was constructed primarily in brick, with mostly terraces of houses and some flats. Provision was made for community facilities and three shopping areas were planned to break up the size of the development. Some industrial development already existed to the south and adjacent to the A12 road and this was retained.

== Governance ==
Hornchurch and Upminster constituency in Greater London

Harold Hill is located within the Heaton and Gooshays electoral wards, with Heaton covering the west and Gooshays the east. Each ward elects three councillors to Havering London Borough Council. All of Harold Hill is within the Hornchurch and Upminster UK Parliament constituency and the Havering and Redbridge London Assembly constituency.

== Geography ==
Harold Hill is situated on the north-eastern edge of London's urban sprawl, almost 17 miles (27 km) from Charing Cross. The district has clear geographic boundaries formed in the south by the A12 road, in the east by the M25 motorway and in the north where the built up area ends at Noak Hill Road. Large sections of parklands and woodlands are in the middle and on the edges of the estate, including Central Park and Dagnam Park. The land is gently undulating, the most significant feature being a tributary of the River Ingrebourne called Carter's Brook and Paine's Brook, which runs north to south through the middle of Harold Hill. To the south is Gidea Park, to the north is Noak Hill, to the west is Collier Row and to the east is Great Warley. Harold Hill is part of the Romford post town in the RM3 postcode district, which also includes Harold Wood and Noak Hill. Climate data for Harold Hill is taken from the nearest weather station at Greenwich.

Climate data for Greenwich Park, elevation: 47 m (154 ft), 1991–2020 normals, extremes 1948–2004
Month	Jan	Feb	Mar	Apr	May	Jun	Jul	Aug	Sep	Oct	Nov	Dec	Year
Record high °C (°F)	16.8 (62.2)	19.7 (67.5)	23.3 (73.9)	25.3 (77.5)	29.0 (84.2)	34.5 (94.1)	35.3 (95.5)	37.5 (99.5)	30.2 (86.4)	26.1 (79.0)	18.9 (66.0)	16.4 (61.5)	37.5 (99.5)
Mean daily maximum °C (°F)	8.5 (47.3)	9.2 (48.6)	12.1 (53.8)	15.4 (59.7)	18.6 (65.5)	21.4 (70.5)	23.8 (74.8)	23.3 (73.9)	20.3 (68.5)	15.8 (60.4)	11.6 (52.9)	8.9 (48.0)	15.8 (60.4)
Daily mean °C (°F)	5.9 (42.6)	6.2 (43.2)	8.4 (47.1)	10.7 (51.3)	13.8 (56.8)	16.7 (62.1)	18.8 (65.8)	18.7 (65.7)	15.9 (60.6)	12.4 (54.3)	8.8 (47.8)	6.3 (43.3)	11.9 (53.4)
Mean daily minimum °C (°F)	3.4 (38.1)	3.2 (37.8)	4.7 (40.5)	6.0 (42.8)	9.1 (48.4)	12.0 (53.6)	13.9 (57.0)	14.1 (57.4)	11.6 (52.9)	9.0 (48.2)	6.1 (43.0)	3.8 (38.8)	8.1 (46.6)
Record low °C (°F)	−12.7 (9.1)	−9.4 (15.1)	−6.7 (19.9)	−4.8 (23.4)	−1.0 (30.2)	1.1 (34.0)	5.0 (41.0)	5.3 (41.5)	1.1 (34.0)	−2.1 (28.2)	−8.0 (17.6)	−10.5 (13.1)	−12.7 (9.1)
Average precipitation mm (inches)	43.9 (1.73)	39.9 (1.57)	36.5 (1.44)	38.6 (1.52)	44.0 (1.73)	49.3 (1.94)	36.3 (1.43)	53.0 (2.09)	52.4 (2.06)	58.3 (2.30)	59.9 (2.36)	50.7 (2.00)	562.9 (22.16)
Average precipitation days (≥ 1.0 mm)	10.5	9.2	7.9	8.1	7.9	7.8	7.1	8.2	7.9	10.3	10.6	10.2	105.6
Mean monthly sunshine hours	44.4	66.1	109.7	152.9	198.7	198.6	209.2	198.0	140.6	99.7	58.5	50.1	1,526.4
Source 1: Met Office
Source 2: Starlings Roost Weather

== Transport ==
The nearest railway station is at Harold Wood, approximately 1 mile (1.6 km) south of the centre of the estate, and is one of the stations on the Elizabeth line. The nearest London Underground station is at Upminster, approximately 3 miles (4.8 km) to the south. Transport for London provides bus routes 174, 256, 294, 346, 496, 499 and N86.

== Education ==
History

By the early 1960s, Harold Hill had six secondary schools:

- Broxhill Secondary Modern (Mixed), near the corner of Broxhill Road and Noak Hill Road. Amongst its notable former pupils is Dr David Scurry, Dean of Undergraduate Programmes, Oxford Brookes University, 1989–2008.
- Harold Hill Grammar School (Mixed), in Appleby Drive
- Harrowfield Secondary Modern School (Boys), in Settle Road
- Harrowfield Secondary Modern School (Girls), in Settle Road – adjacent, but run separately
- Quarles Secondary Modern School (Boys), in Tring Gardens
- Quarles Secondary Modern School (Girls), in Tring Gardens – adjacent, but run separately

These schools had been built to cope with the post-Second World War "baby-boom", but because of government education policy, Broxhill and Harold Hill Grammar merged to form Bedfords Park Comprehensive. Then because of demographic changes, Quarles Boys' and Girls' Schools later merged with Harrowfield to form the Neave School (later King's Wood).

Present

After further name changes and closures, Harold Hill now has just one secondary school, Drapers' Academy, on the site of the former Harrowfield/Neave/King's Wood schools. Havering College, a mixed college of further education, is situated on the site of the former Quarles Secondary Modern Schools, in Tring Gardens.

== Culture and community ==
Every year in Harold Hill there is a community festival held in Central Park normally in early July called the Harold Hill Festival.

Ian Dury referenced Harold Hill in self-penned song, "This Is What We Find":

"Home improvement expert Harold Hill from Harold Hill"

"Of do it yourself dexterity and double glazing skill"
"Came home to find another gentleman's kippers in the grill"

"So he sanded off his winkle with his Black & Decker drill"

— Ian Dury

The song set all three of its verses in real places; the others were Turnham Green and Lambeth Walk. In his double CD, Retrospective Reasons To be Cheerful produced by Repertoire Records, Dury stated that he never wrote another verse as good as Harold Hill's verse.

The area has been covered in relation to various murders and attempted murders. Despite its past, Harold Hill is now one of the fastest improving boroughs since the council built the Myplace centre, a new community and performance space, allowing young people a safe location to spend time with their friends. The Prime Minister said that since Draper's Academy opened in Settle Road, it has become one of the fastest improving schools in England helping Harold Hill improve in the future. It has had so much success in the past year that the Queen visited Drapers Academy in October 2012, that being her first visit to Harold Hill.

Bedrock is the local hospital radio service available online to the local area and broadcasting a range of health-related information and locally produced entertainment. Radio Harold Hill which started in 2013 is the local community radio station and broadcasts online on their website and on mobile apps.

== Sport ==
The area has its own non league football club, Harold Hill F.C. who currently play in the Mid-Essex League Premier Division at the Henderson Sports & social club, Kenilworth Avenue.
