= Drapers' Academy =

Location
- Settle Road; Romford, Greater London, RM3 9XR; England
- Coordinates: 51°36′37″N 0°14′25″E

Information
- Type: Academy sponsor-led
- Established: September 2010
- Trust: Drapers Multi-academy Trust
- Department for Education URN: 136090 Tables
- Ofsted: Reports
- Chair: Oliver Everett
- Principal: Gillian Dineen
- Gender: Mixed
- Age: 11 to 19
- Enrolment: 1140
- Capacity: 1100
- Website: www.drapersacademy.com

Drapers' Academy is a secondary school for girls and boys, from years 7 to 13 sixth form with academy status, located in Harold Hill near Romford, Greater London, England. It was the first academy to be established in the London Borough of Havering.

== History ==
It was established in September 2010 under the joint sponsorship of the Drapers' Company and Queen Mary, University of London. It is located on the site of the former King's Wood School. Its future was thrown into doubt on 7 July 2010 by the government's announcement of cuts to the national school building programme, but after reconsideration was given approval on 6 August.

== Description ==
For two years the Academy occupied one of the original King's Wood buildings while the new buildings were being constructed and the extensive 23 acre grounds re-landscaped. This work is now completed and the new buildings opened on 3 September 2012. The new buildings were designed by architects Feilden Clegg Bradley Studios working with structural, mechanical and electrical engineers WSP for main contractor Kier and won an RIBA National Award in 2014

Queen Elizabeth II (a Freeman of the Drapers' Company) officially opened the buildings on 26 October 2012.

The Academy is designed to be a 'Harold Hill School for Harold Hill Families.' The Academy specialisms are science and mathematics but a broad syllabus is taught.

The Academy is also home to a Sixth Form hosting 200 students.

Drapers' Academy is a member school of the Drapers' Multi-Academy Trust, along with Drapers' Maylands Primary School, Drapers' Pyrgo Priory School, Drapers' Brookside Infant School and Drapers' Brookside Junior School.
