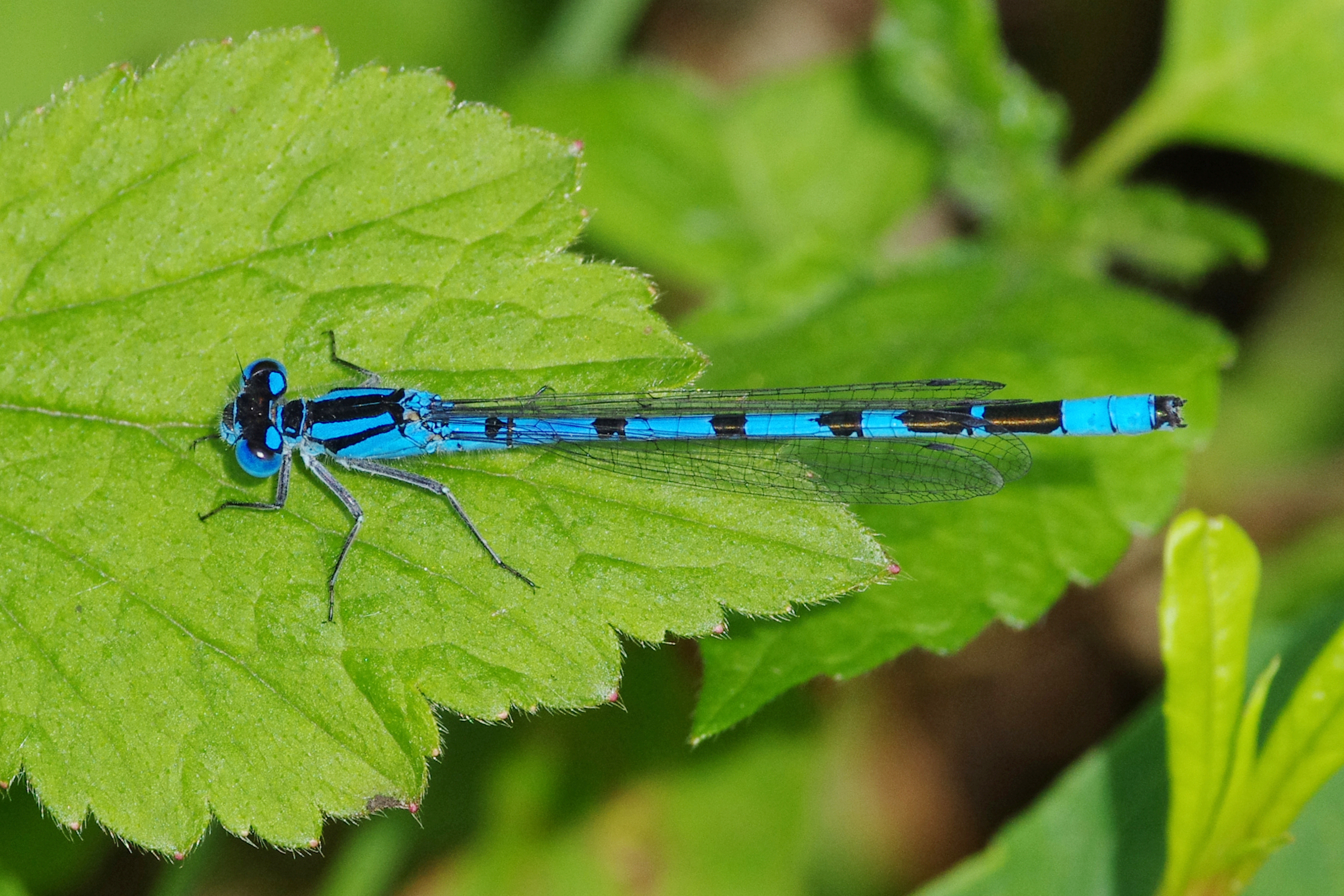
- Adult male
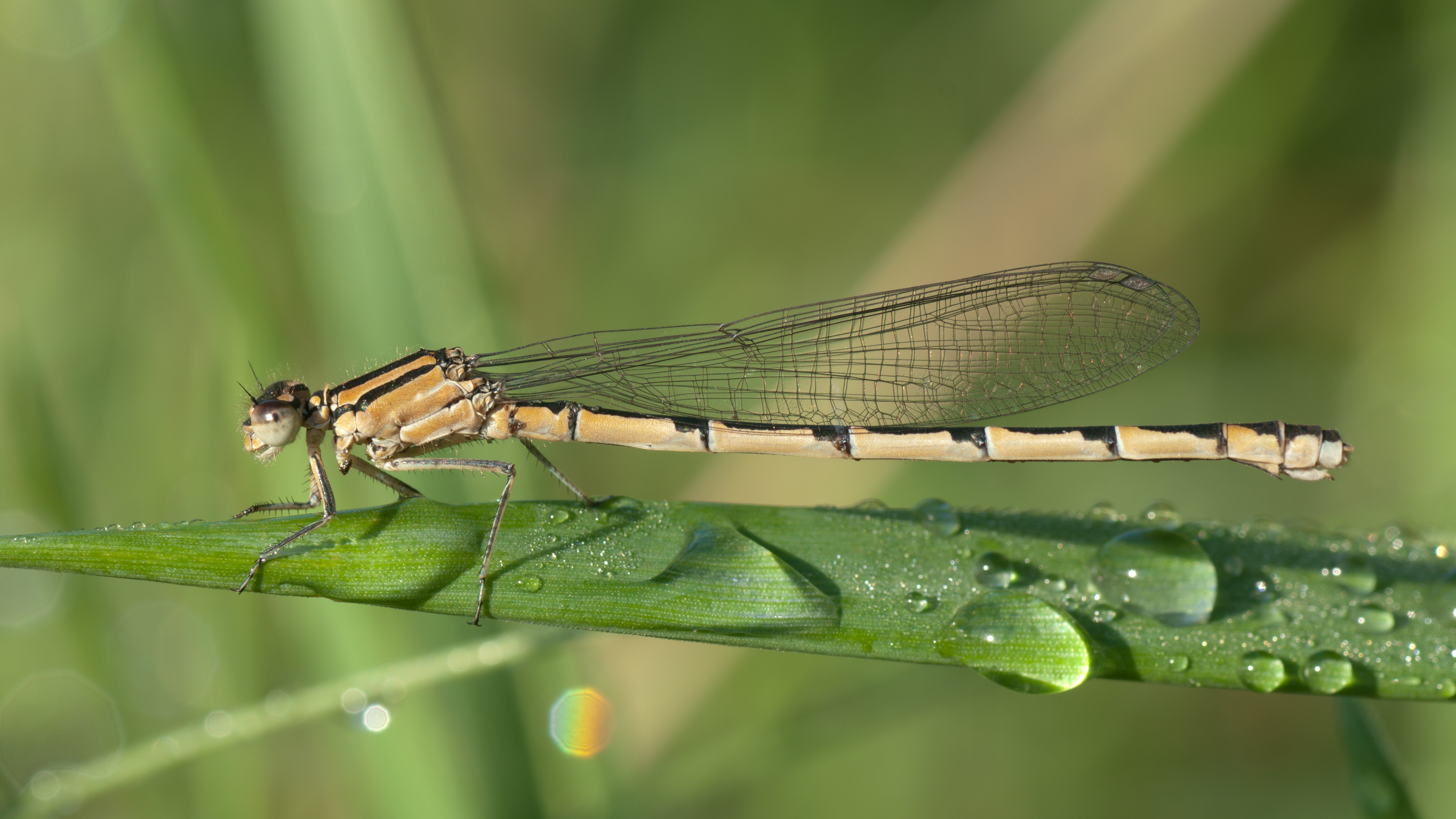
- Adult female

Conservation status
- Least Concern (IUCN 3.1)

Scientific classification
- Kingdom: Animalia
- Phylum: Arthropoda
- Clade: Pancrustacea
- Class: Insecta
- Order: Odonata
- Suborder: Zygoptera
- Family: Coenagrionidae
- Genus: Enallagma
- Species: E. cyathigerum

Binomial name
- Enallagma cyathigerum (Charpentier, 1840)

Synonyms
- Agrion annexum Stephens, 1835 (nec Charpentier, 1825); Agrion pulchrum Hagen, 1840; Agrion charpentieri Selys, 1840; Agrion annexum Hagen, 1861; Enallagma robustum Selys, 1875; Enallagma continentale Belyshev, 1956

= Enallagma cyathigerum =

Common blue damselfly

Species of damselfly

Enallagma cyathigerum (common blue damselfly or common bluet) is a species found mainly between latitudes 40°N and 72°N; It is widely distributed in the Palearctic, common in all European countries (including Portugal, Spain, France, Great Britain, Ireland, Germany, Sweden, Norway, Finland, Poland, etc.) and in Asia in Turkey, Iran, Russia, and South Korea, and throughout Ontario in North America. The species reaches a length of 29–36 mm (1.1–1.4 in) with wings 18–20 mm (0.71–0.79 in) long. Damselflies are an important link between the health of the aquatic ecosystem and its response to climate change. The closely related Nearctic species Enallagma annexum (northern bluet) was at one time considered to be synonymous with it.

== Habitat ==
These damselflies inhabit freshwater bodies whose conditions range, they have been seen in acidic fens as well as eutrophic ponds. They have been considered one of the more sensitive insects in an aquatic setting. They are important within the trophic levels as they are an intermediate predator. They consume smaller larvae and they are preyed on by fish and larvae bigger than them.

The larvae prefer a habitat that has a more complex structure in the ground composition as well as the plants. The larval stages spend most of their time within the plants, climbing and feeding. Although they do prefer a more complex habitat, they can also be found in habitats with simpler vegetation. They are efficient in both complexities equally, but the complex vegetation also serves as protection from fish.

These larvae are able to live in a dense population in shallow areas of water without showing signs of competition between the larvae. The damselfly larvae require a plant structure that can withstand the backward movement that occurs when the labium protracts to catch food.

== Identification ==
The males of this species are a caerulean blue colour with black markings, while the females have a larger variation in their colouring.

Within females there are a few different morphs in which they can take, andromorph and heteromorph. Andromorphic females resemble the caerulean blue males, but they have more black patterning on their bodies. The heteromorphic females are more of a brown or green brown colour and do not resemble the males at all. The reasoning behind the different morphs is to attempt to limit the amount of attention the female receives when she is near the water for reproduction.

The common blue damselfly can be easily mistaken for the azure damselfly (Coenagrion puella), but on the back and the thorax, the common blue damselfly has more blue than black; for the azure damselfly it is the other way around. The second segment of the thorax has a distinctive spot with a line below connecting to the third segment.

Another difference can be observed when inspecting the side of the thorax. The common blue damselfly has only one small black stripe there, while all other blue damselflies have two.

== Lifecycles ==
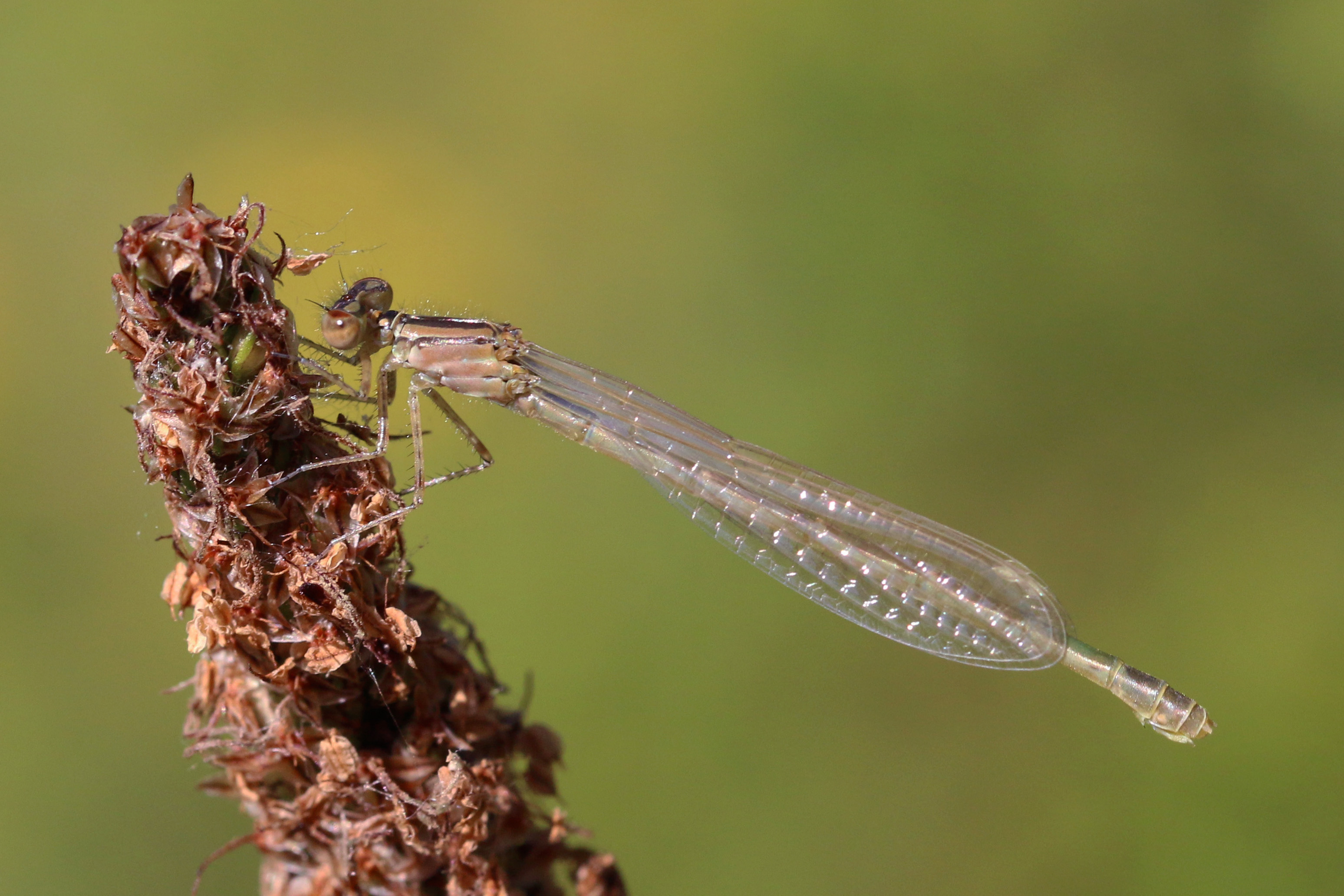
Newly emerged

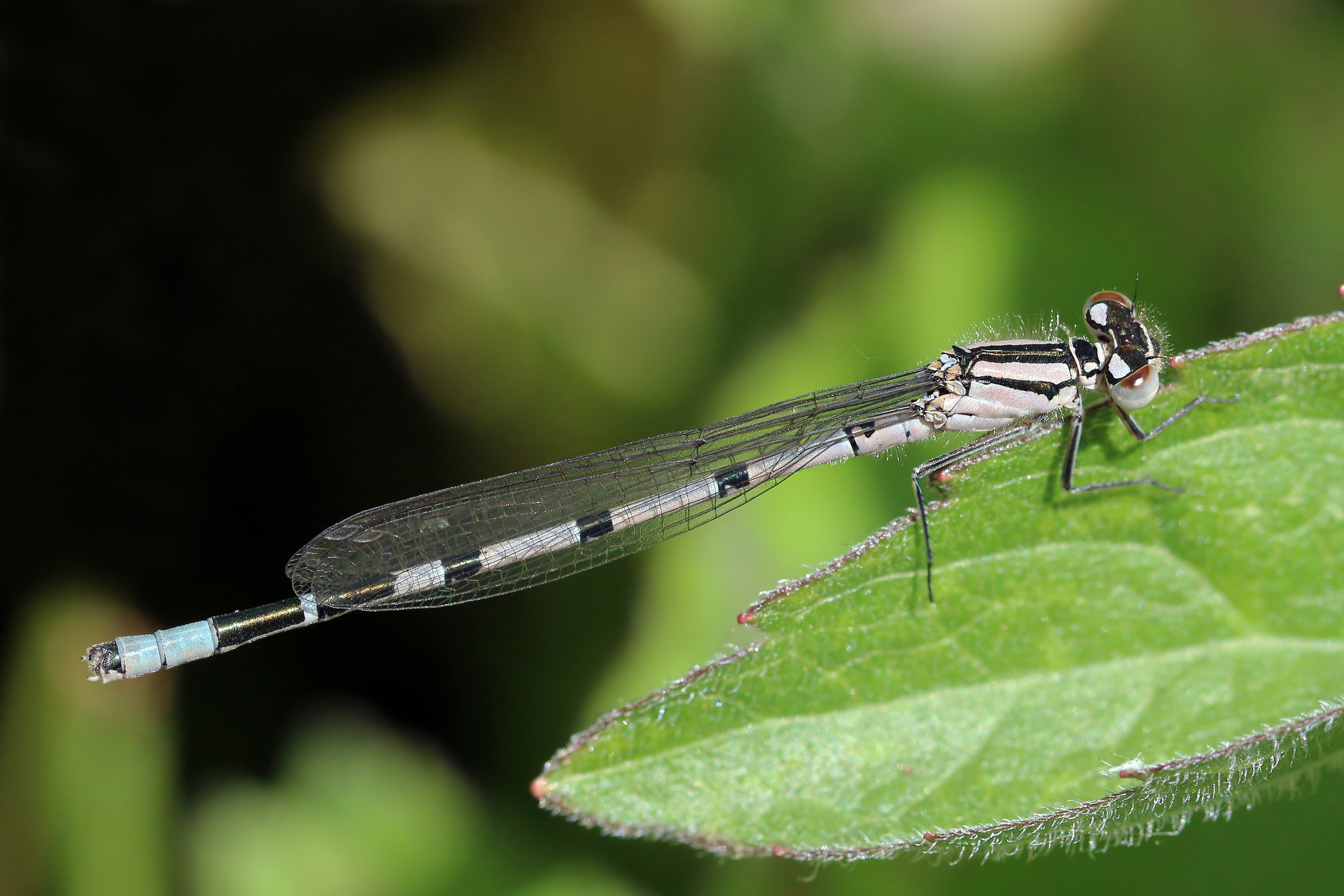
Immature male

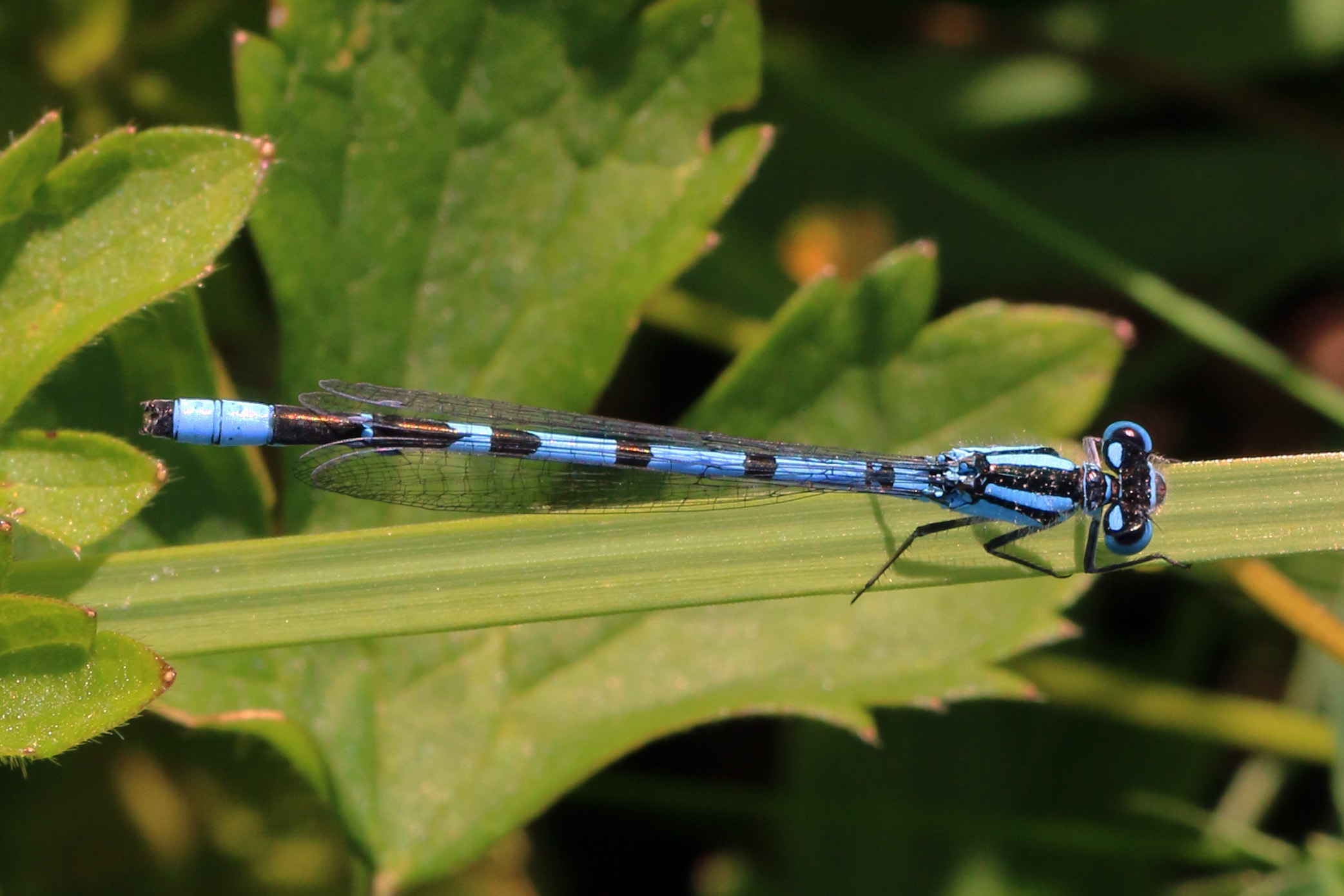
Adult male

The lifecycle of this species begins in freshwater, they spend most of their time as larvae. The larval stage depends on the temperature, light, and the resource level. Once the temperatures drop the larvae can go into a state called diapause instead of dying. The damselflies that endure diapause effect the body size for the next season. Since these damselflies are flexible, they have two different lifecycles depending on latitude univoltine or semivoltine. The more north these damselflies are found, the more likely they are to be semivoltine. By being able to shift the lifecycle due to the conditions this allows for twice the amount of development time, so larger adults are typically found in more northern areas.

Once the larvae emerge as adults between May and August they have a brief time to feed before they are to find a mate and reproduce the next generation of larvae. Once emerged, there is an estimated sex ratio of 1:1 within the colony, allows for mating within the colony to be less of a competition.

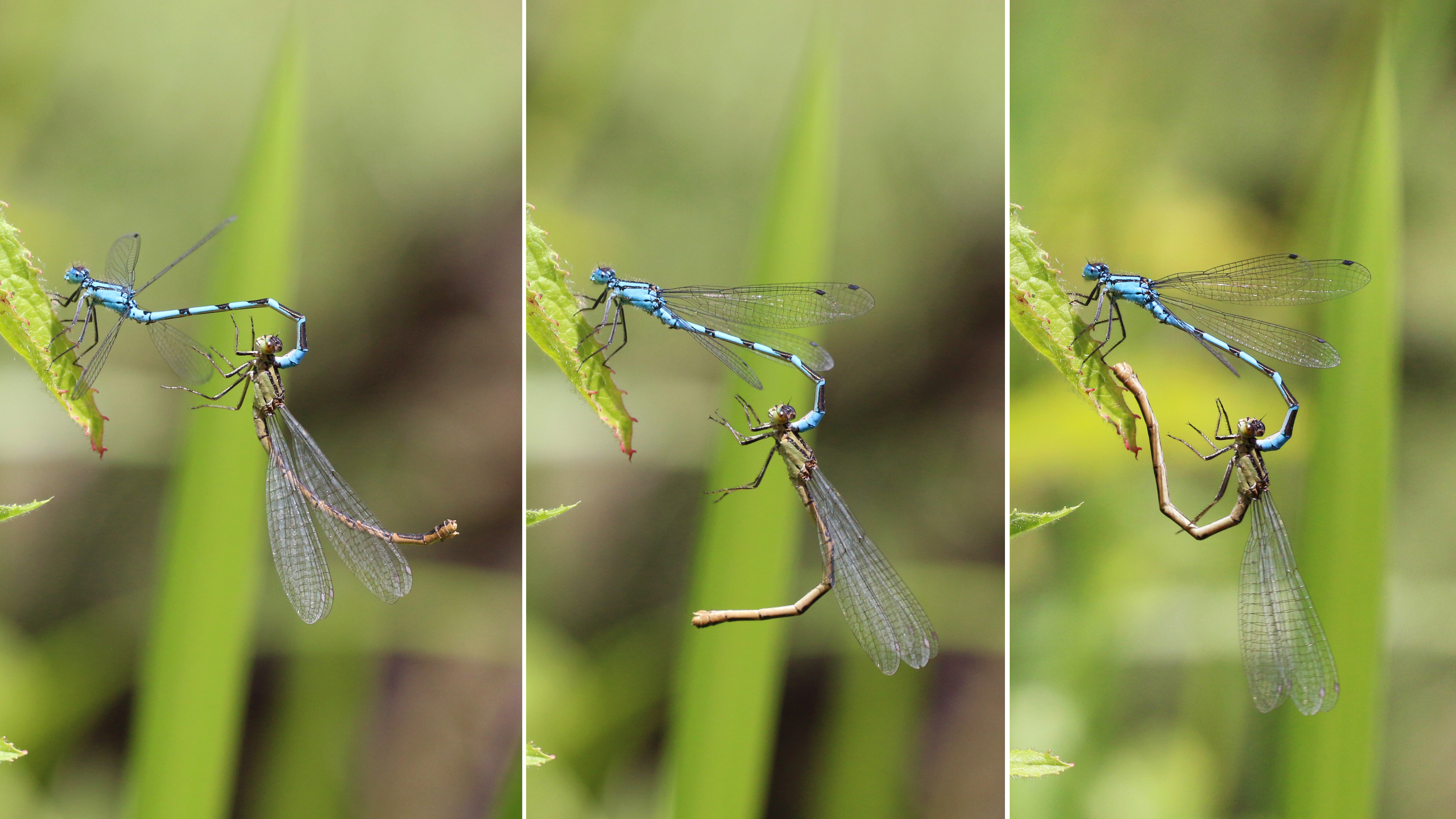
Female initiating mating (heterochrome female)

During mating, the male clasps the female by her neck while she bends her body around to his reproductive organs – this is called a mating wheel. The pair flies together over the water and eggs are laid within a suitable plant, just below the surface. The eggs hatch and the larvae, called nymphs, live in the water and feed on small aquatic animals. Nymphs climb out of the water up a suitable stem to molt into damselflies.

== Behaviour ==
All Coenagrionid larvae have a broad range in diet, so they can live in many different habitats. The larvae are able to eat relatively large prey items, but the prey are typically less mobile and therefore easier to catch. The males in the colony show a higher mobility level compared to other species. There has also been pairings with Ischnura elegans and Coenagrion puella which are similar to Enallagma, although this occurs when there is same species mates are unable to be located. This damselfly requires a close look for a beginner to distinguish them from an azure damselfly. Typically, they fly low through the reeds and often fly well out over the water, unlike azure damselflies. They are also a brighter blue.

== Mitogenome ==
The mitogenome was sequenced for this species. The circular DNA sequence is 16,661 base pairs long. Within the order Odonata it is one of the largest mitogenomes to be sequenced thus far. The composition of the sequence is 74.2% adenine and thymine and 25.8% cytosine and guanine. This knowledge assists with the placement within a phylogenetic tree.

== Human impacts ==
Pesticides have a large impact on this species due to its sensitivity. These pesticides are introduced to the water by runoff and by being added directly. Being exposed to pesticides made these organisms less likely to be successful in metamorphosis with the effects being worse the longer the organism is exposed. The exposure to the larvae has effects on the adult life stage in regard to their fitness Behaviour is lessened by the introduction of pesticides.

== Gallery ==
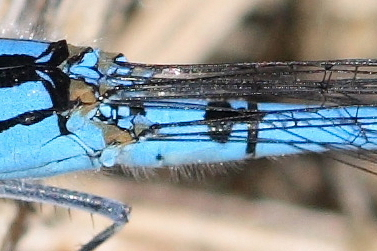
Distinctive marking at base of abdomen of male segment S2

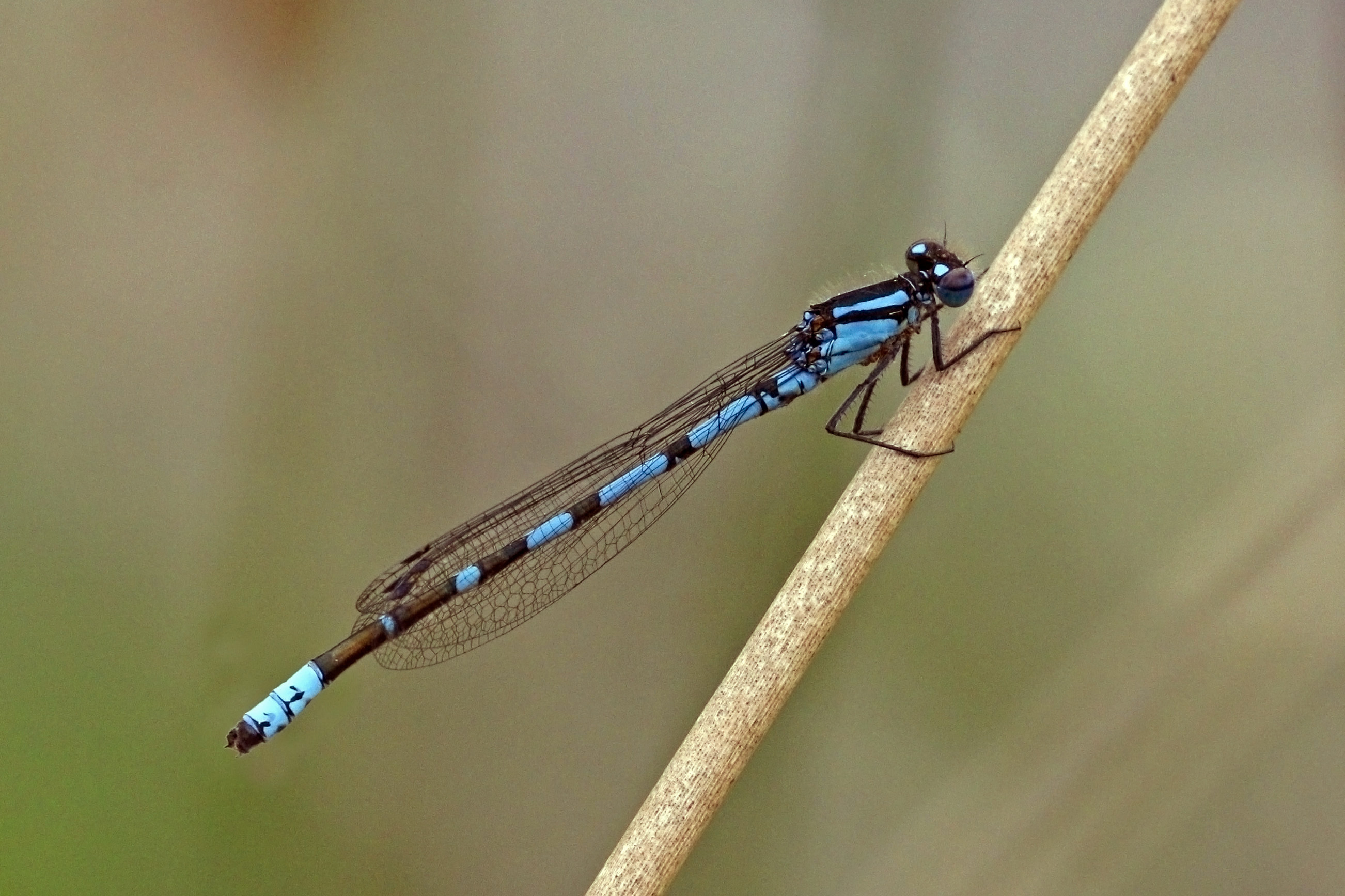
Adult male, dark variant of S2

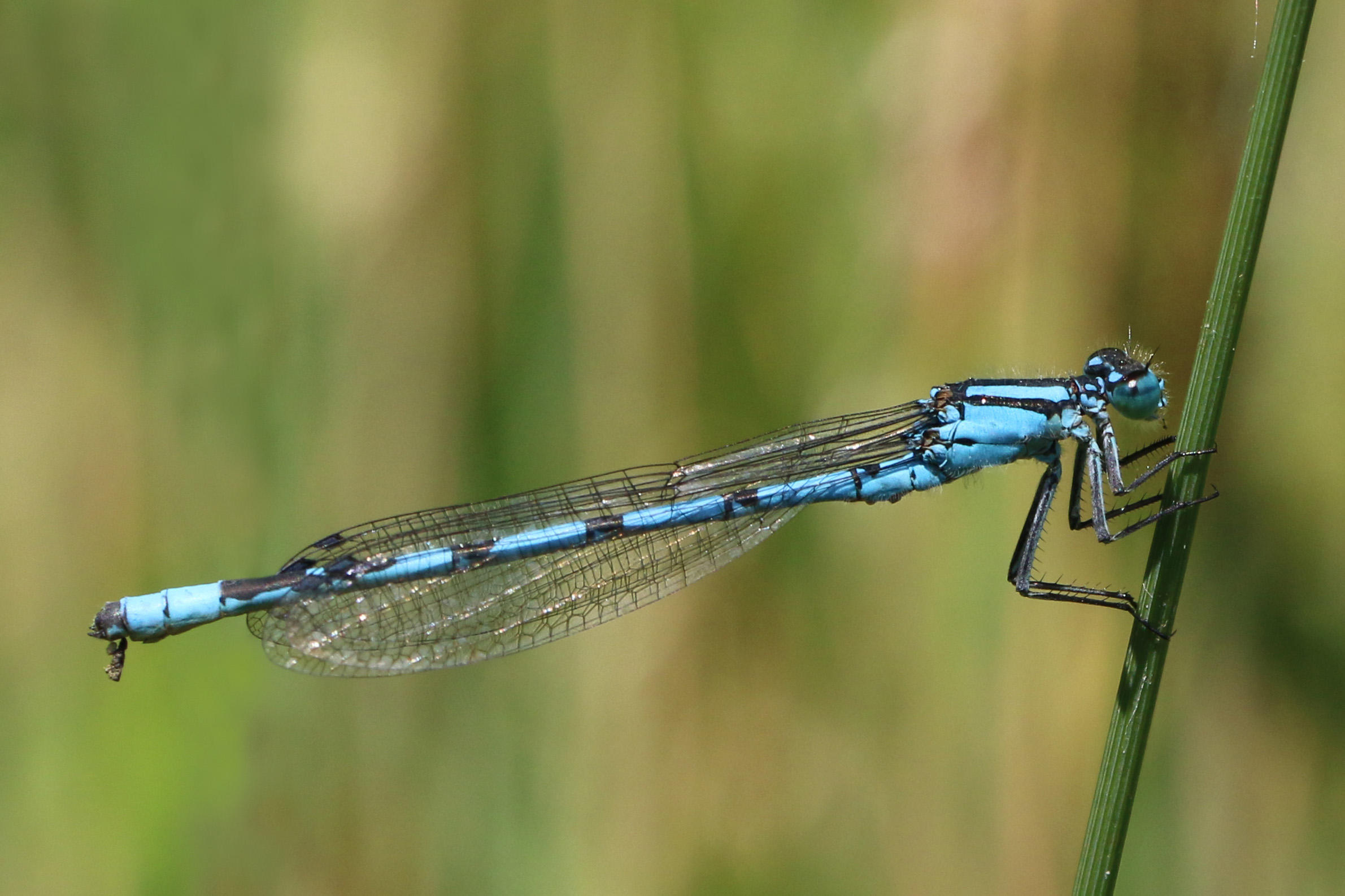
Adult male

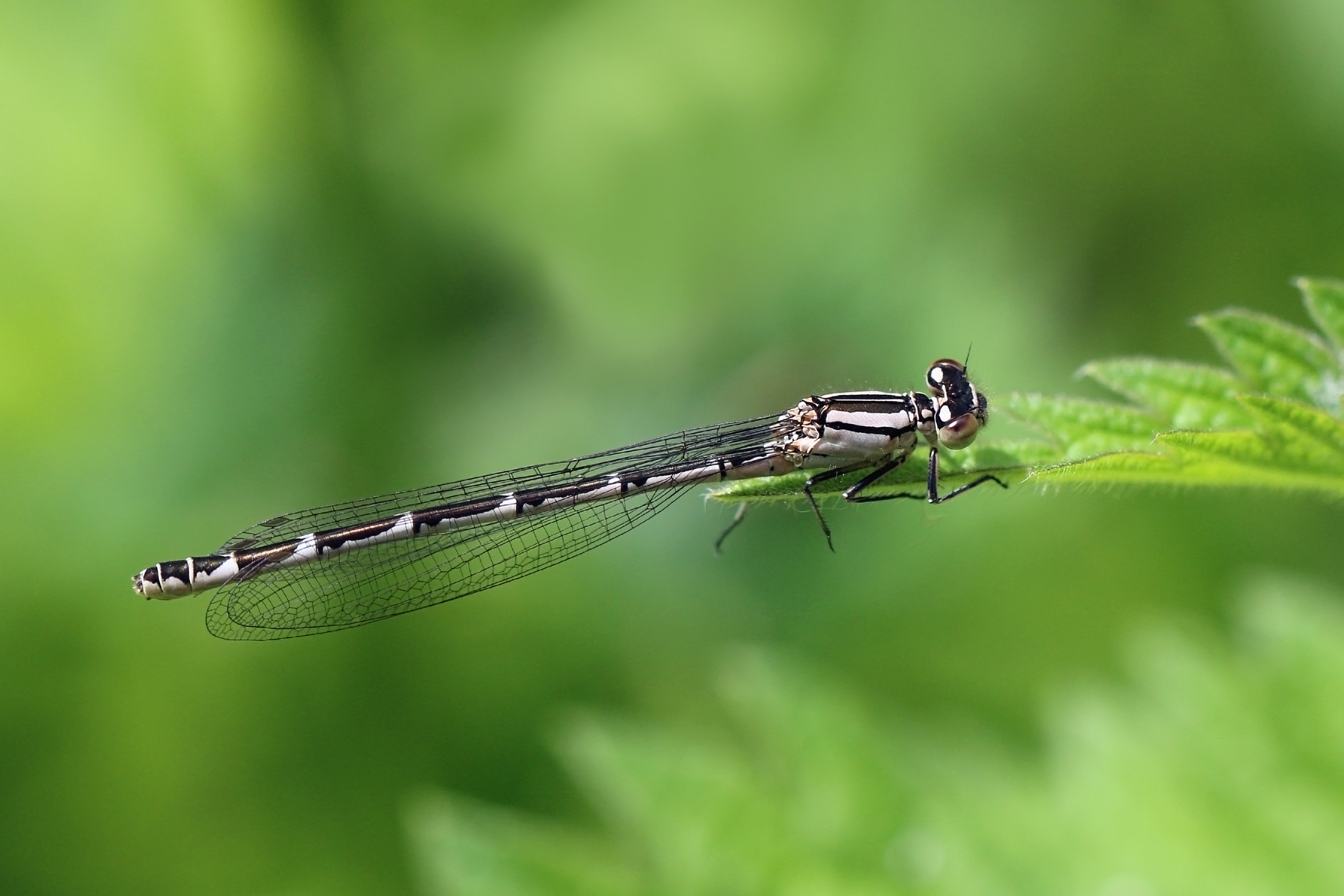
Heterochrome female

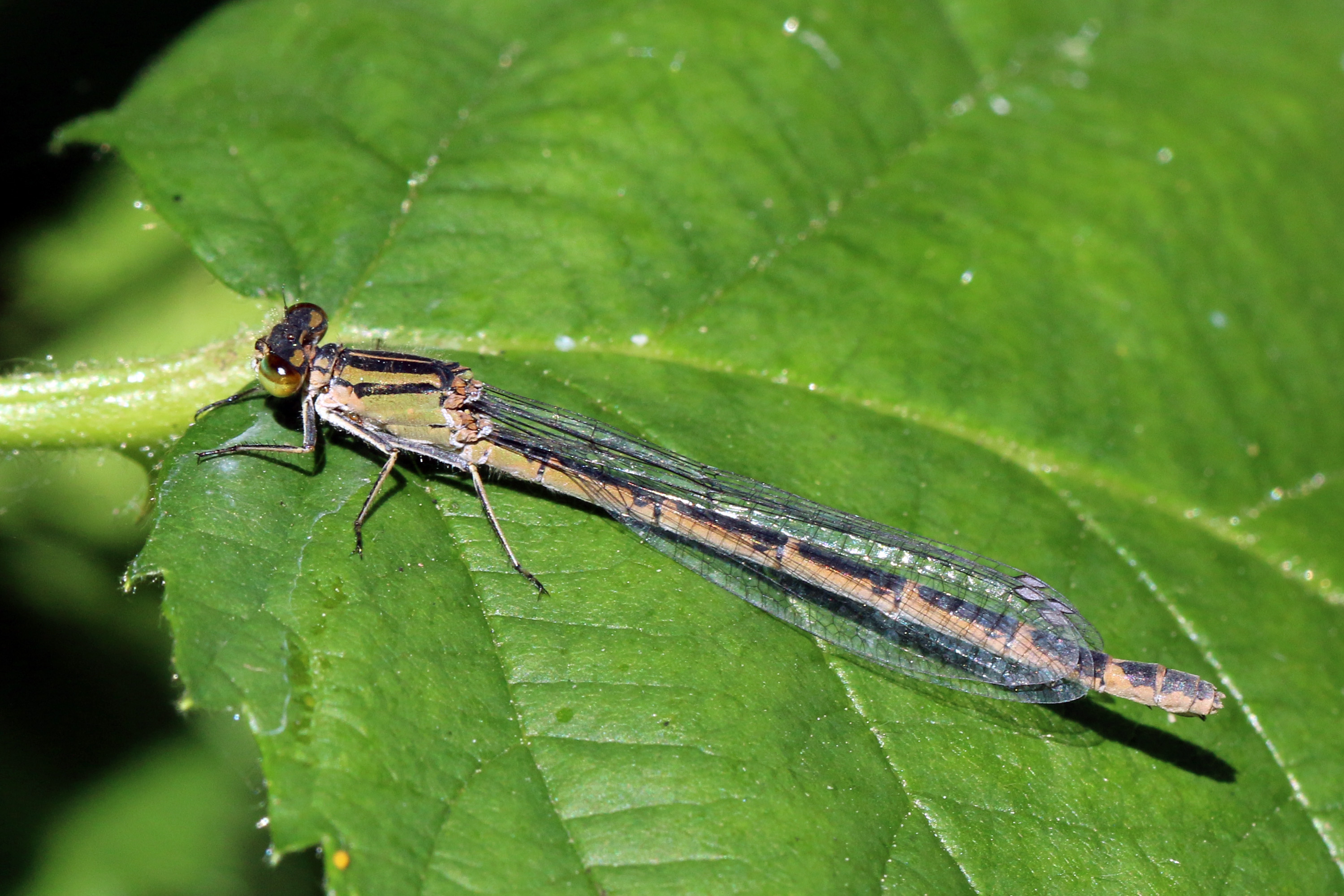
Heterochrome female (green variety)

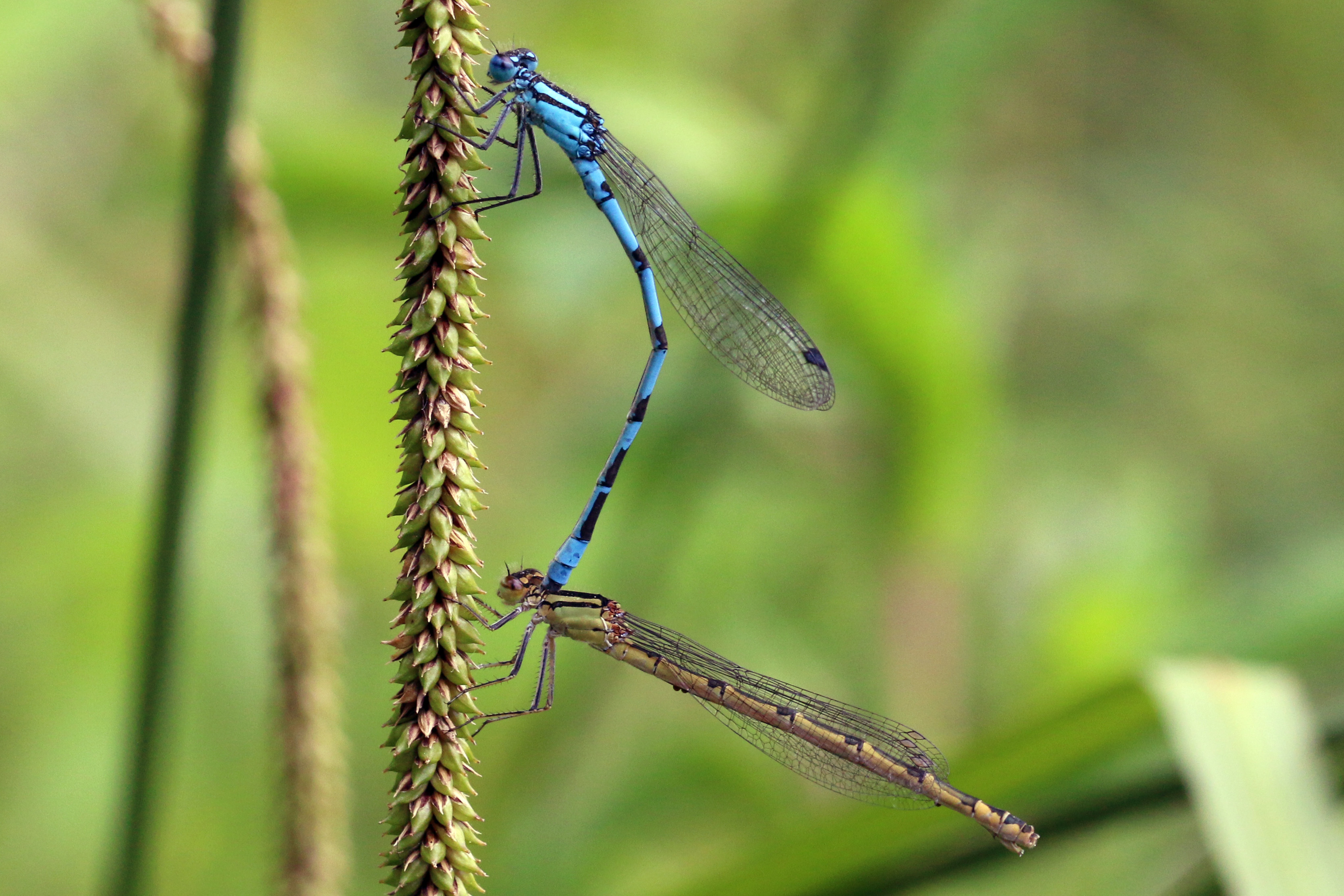
In tandem
(heterochrome female)

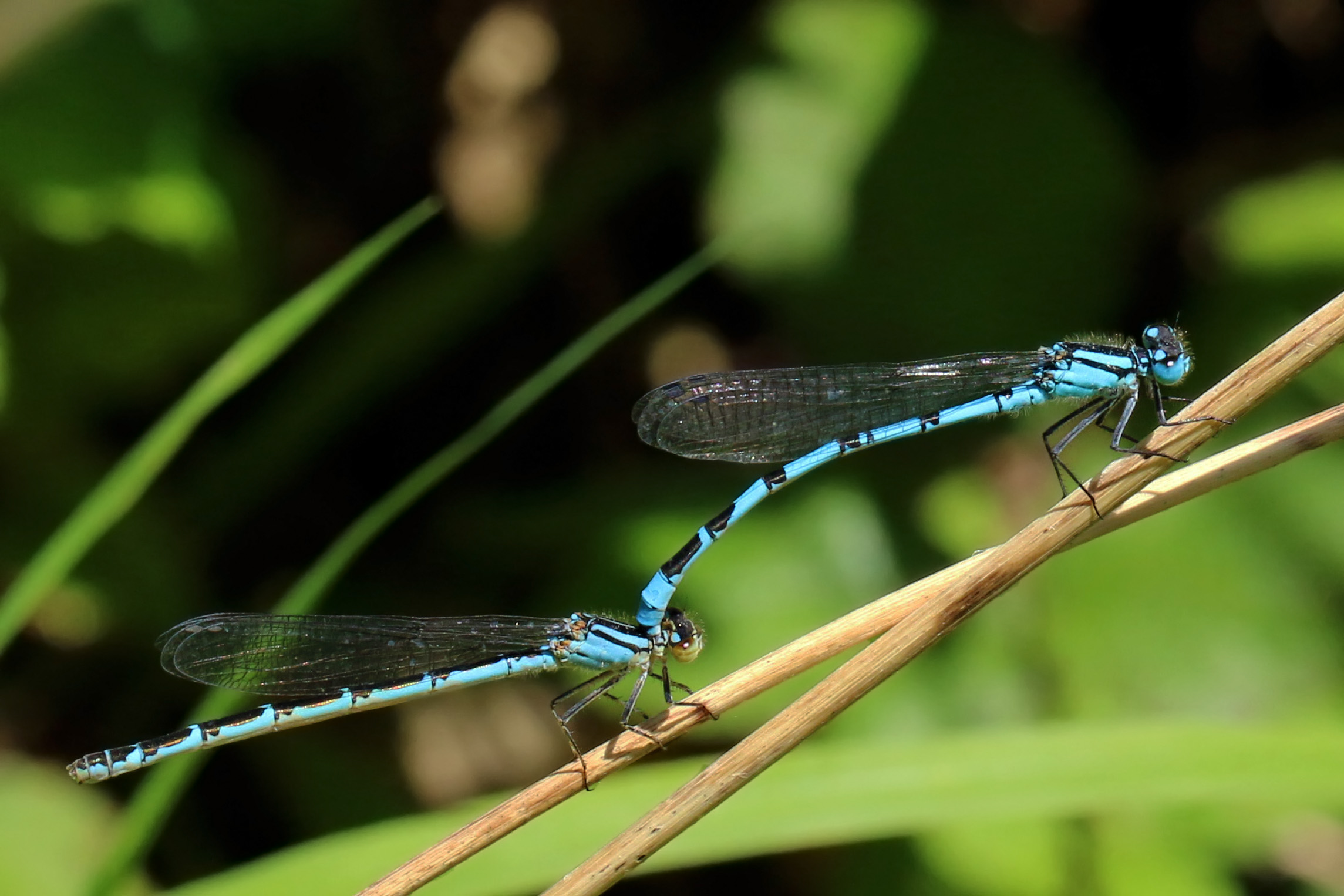
In tandem
(homochrome female)

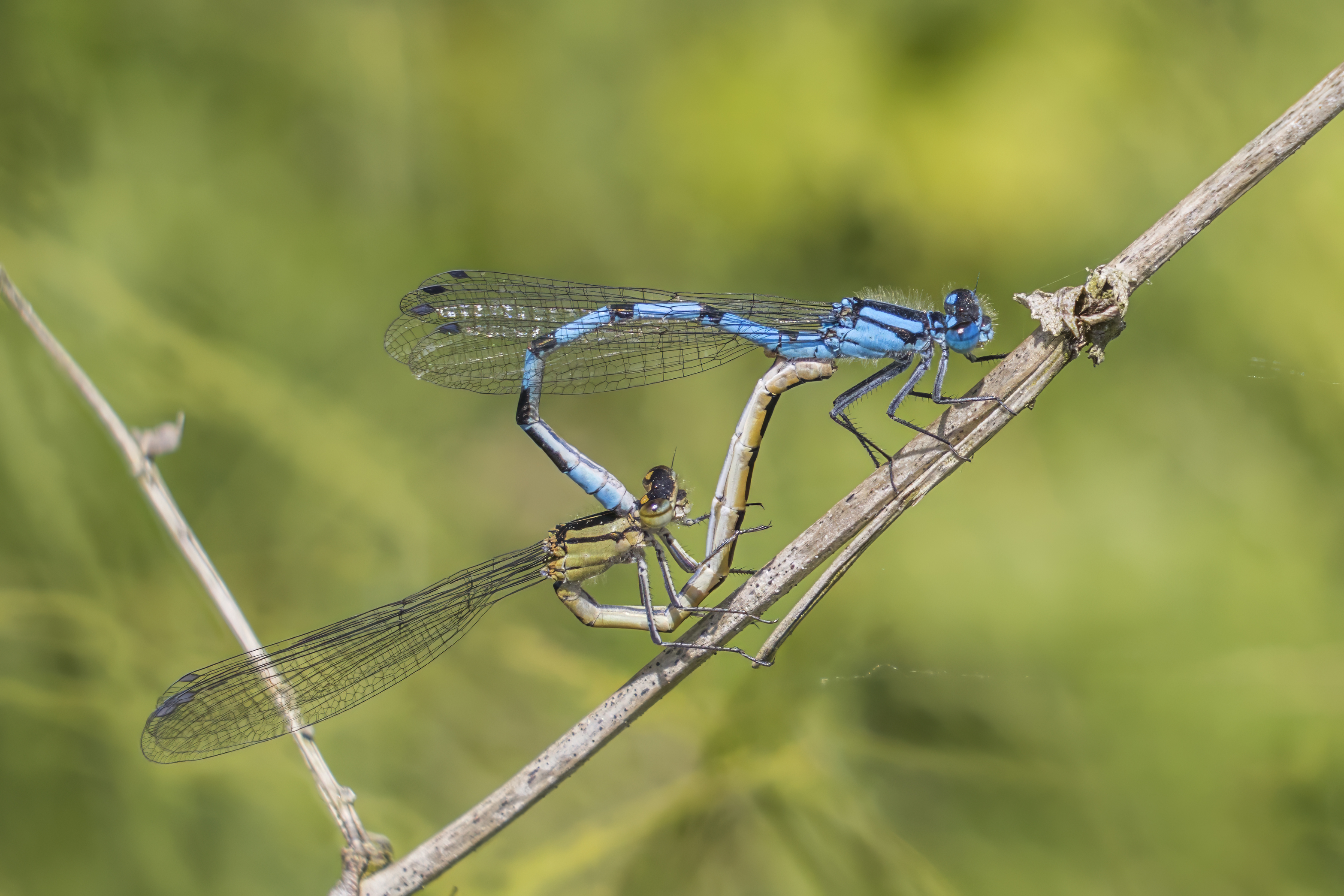
Mating

Oviposition on Marsilea quadrifolia

Common blue damselfly, genus Enallagma, family Coenagrionidae

== See also ==
- Azure damselfly, a similar looking species
- Ischnura heterosticta, a similar Australian damselfly
- List of British dragonflies
