= Common bluetail =

Common bluetail may refer to any of several damselfly species:

- Ischnura senegalensis, in Africa and the Middle East
- Ischnura heterosticta, in Australia
- Ischnura elegans, the blue-tailed damselfly, in Europe
