= Kingwood =

Kingwood may refer to:

- Kingwood (wood), a classic wood used for inlay work in furniture

== Places ==
- Kingwood Center, Mansfield, Ohio, USA
- Kingwood, Houston, Texas, USA
- Kingwood, West Virginia, USA
- Kingwood Township, New Jersey, USA

== Music ==
- Kingwood (album), an album by the Swedish punk rock group Millencolin

== See also ==
- Kingswood (disambiguation)
