= Kingswood College Doncaster =

Location
- Doncaster East, Victoria; Australia; 37°45′11″S 145°10′43″E

Information
- Type: Independent, co-educational
- Denomination: Uniting Church
- Established: 1985
- Closed: 1989
- Key people: Brian Keyte (Principal); Peter Haines (Vice Principal)
- Colours: Maroon & grey
- Website: N/A

Kingswood College Doncaster was a co-educational secondary school and primary school located near the corner of Anderson's Creek Road and Warrandyte Road, Doncaster East, Victoria.

A school of the Uniting Church, it operated for five years from 1985 until closure in 1989.

== History ==
The school was established in 1985 in portable buildings on a north facing hillside.

Initially, there were approximately 65 founding students covering years 5, 6 and 7 but over the course of five years, the school expanded to accommodate new students, staff, year levels and buildings.

The founding principal was Brian Keyte and vice principal Peter Haines. They remained in their respective positions until the school's closure.

Due to over expenditure and the strain of the late 1980s recession, the school was closed down at the end of 1989. At the time of the closure, at least 62 staff members and 444 students were engaged at the school.

Subsequently, the grounds became the Doncaster campus of Box Hill Institute of TAFE although this occupation was also short lived. Following the closure of the TAFE, the campus was vacant for some time before being razed in 2007 to make way for redevelopment.

== Setting ==
The school benefited from a natural setting. Along, the northern and eastern boundaries, the Mullum-Mullum Creek meandered through a tree lined valley and in the basin of the valley, the school oval was formed. On the adjacent hillside, buildings were constructed. The south eastern corner near Deep Creek Drive remained mostly indigenous bushland. During 1987, Landscape plans were devised for the front entrance and for the areas around the buildings.

== Academia ==
From an inter-school perspective, Kingswood students competed in the Westpac Maths Competition, the Science Talent Search and the Alliance Francaise Competition.

Within the school, "colors" were awarded for excellence in four areas (academic, creative, practical and personal) and an award (known as the "Wyvern Award") was given to a student at the end of the year for all-round excellence.

== Sports ==
Early on, four sports teams or houses were established in which students were divided. The houses were named after local orchardists (such as Tully and Petty), thus reflecting some of the area's early history. Sports facilities, however, remained limited and this necessitated some trips between Doncaster and the sister campus at Box Hill.

In 1987, Kingswood College Doncaster was admitted to the Eastern Independent Schools of Melbourne (EISM) and began competing with other schools in sports competitions.

== Jump Start ==
In later years, a student rock band was formed consisting of Rachel Drew (vocals), Mark Hardley (vocals), Nick Maurer (guitar), Todd Shattock (keyboards) and Dan Morrison (drums). After finishing high school, Morrison went on to form the bands Mad Not Madness and Area-7.

== Alumni ==
The defunct status of the school presents inherit problems for keen alumni.

In the absence of any official reunion, an internet group utilizing the social utility facebook was established in 2007 in an effort to reconnect former staff and students. As of August 2010, the group has attracted 114 members.
