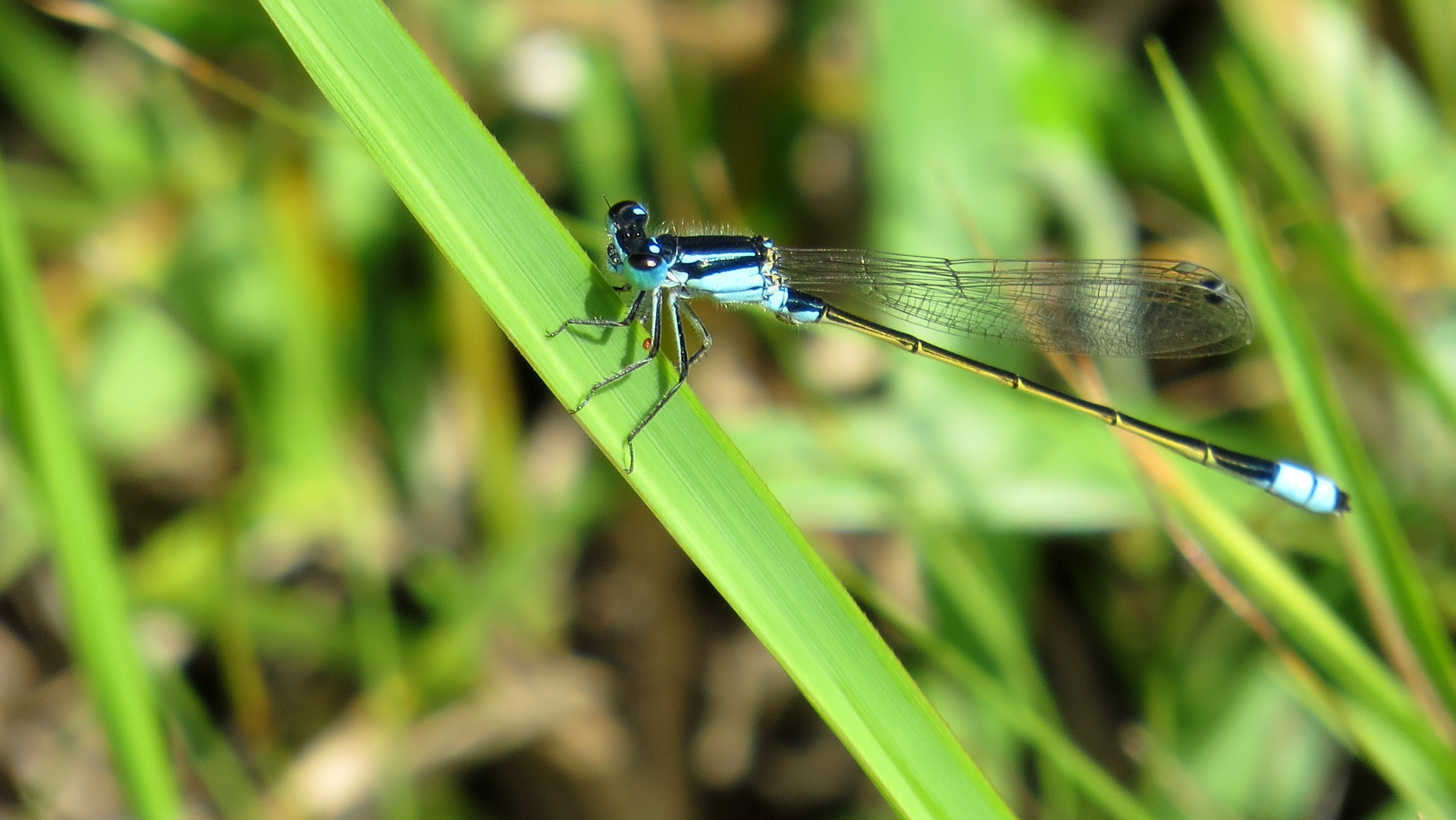
- Male Ischnura heterosticta
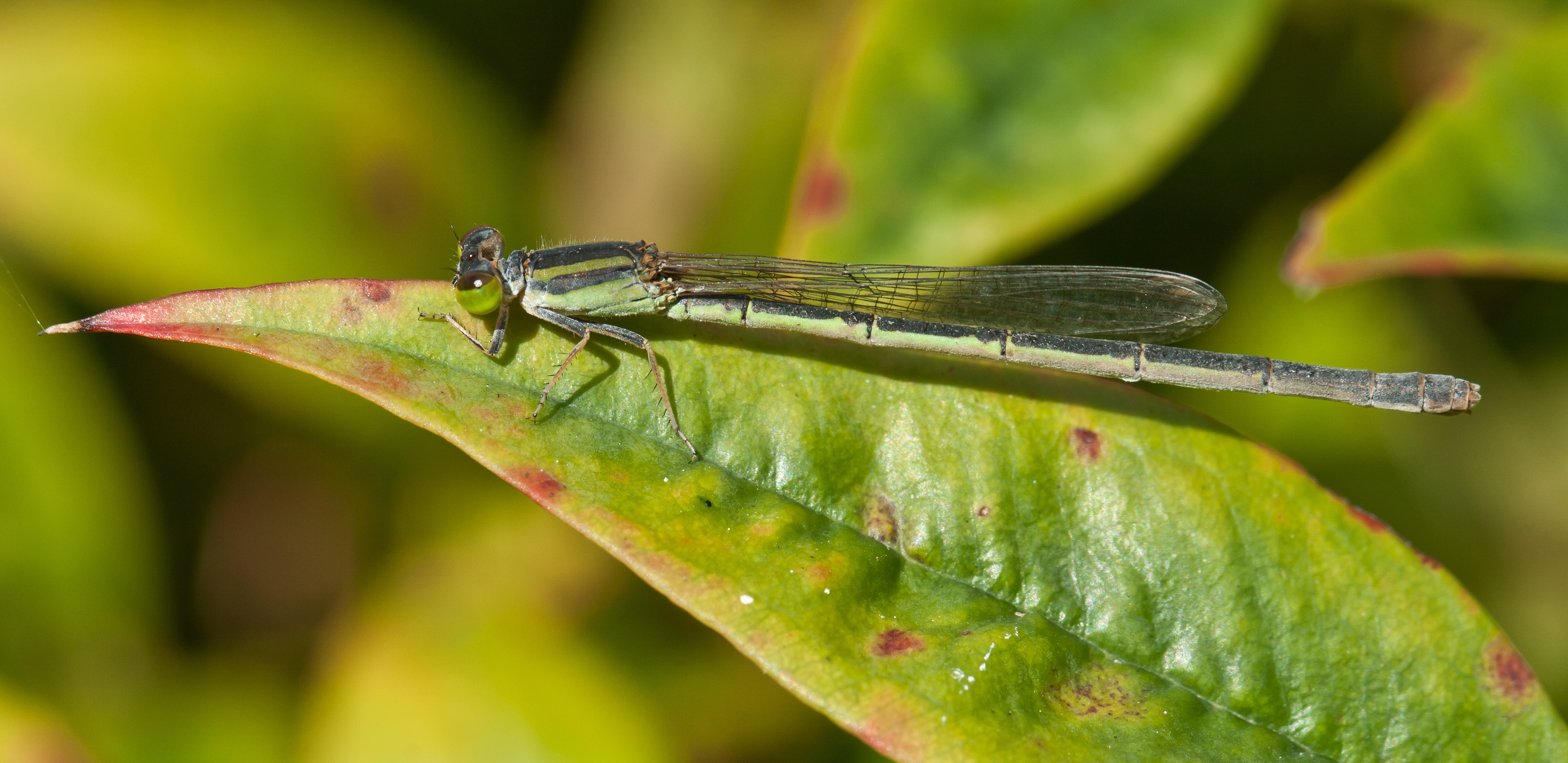
- Female Ischnura heterosticta

Conservation status
- Least Concern (IUCN 3.1)

Scientific classification
- Kingdom: Animalia
- Phylum: Arthropoda
- Clade: Pancrustacea
- Class: Insecta
- Order: Odonata
- Suborder: Zygoptera
- Family: Coenagrionidae
- Genus: Ischnura
- Species: I. heterosticta

Binomial name
- Ischnura heterosticta (Burmeister, 1839)

Synonyms
- Agrion heterostictum Burmeister, 1839; Agrion distigma Brauer, 1869; Ischnura tasmanica Tillyard, 1913; Ischnura torresiana Tillyard, 1913

= Ischnura heterosticta =

Species of damselfly

Ischnura heterosticta, one of at least two species with the common name common bluetail, is an Australian damselfly of the family Coenagrionidae. It is the largest of the three Ischnura species in Australia. They are generally found near slow-running or still water. The species is also salt tolerant. It flies from October to March.

== Description ==
The common bluetail is a small damselfly. Most males have blue eyes, a blue thorax, and a blue ringed tail. The females have a variety of forms including green, brown, black, and a form with very similar colourings to the male.

== Distribution ==
In Australia, Ischnura heterosticta is found throughout the entire continent including Tasmania.

== Etymology ==
The genus name Ischnura is derived from the Greek ἰσχνός (ischnos, "thin" or "slender") and οὐρά (oura, "tail"), referring to the slender abdomen of species in the genus.

The species name heterosticta is derived from the Greek ἕτερος (heteros, "different") and στικτός (stiktos, "spotted" or "tattooed"), referring to the differently coloured pterostigma on the forewings and hindwings.

== Gallery ==
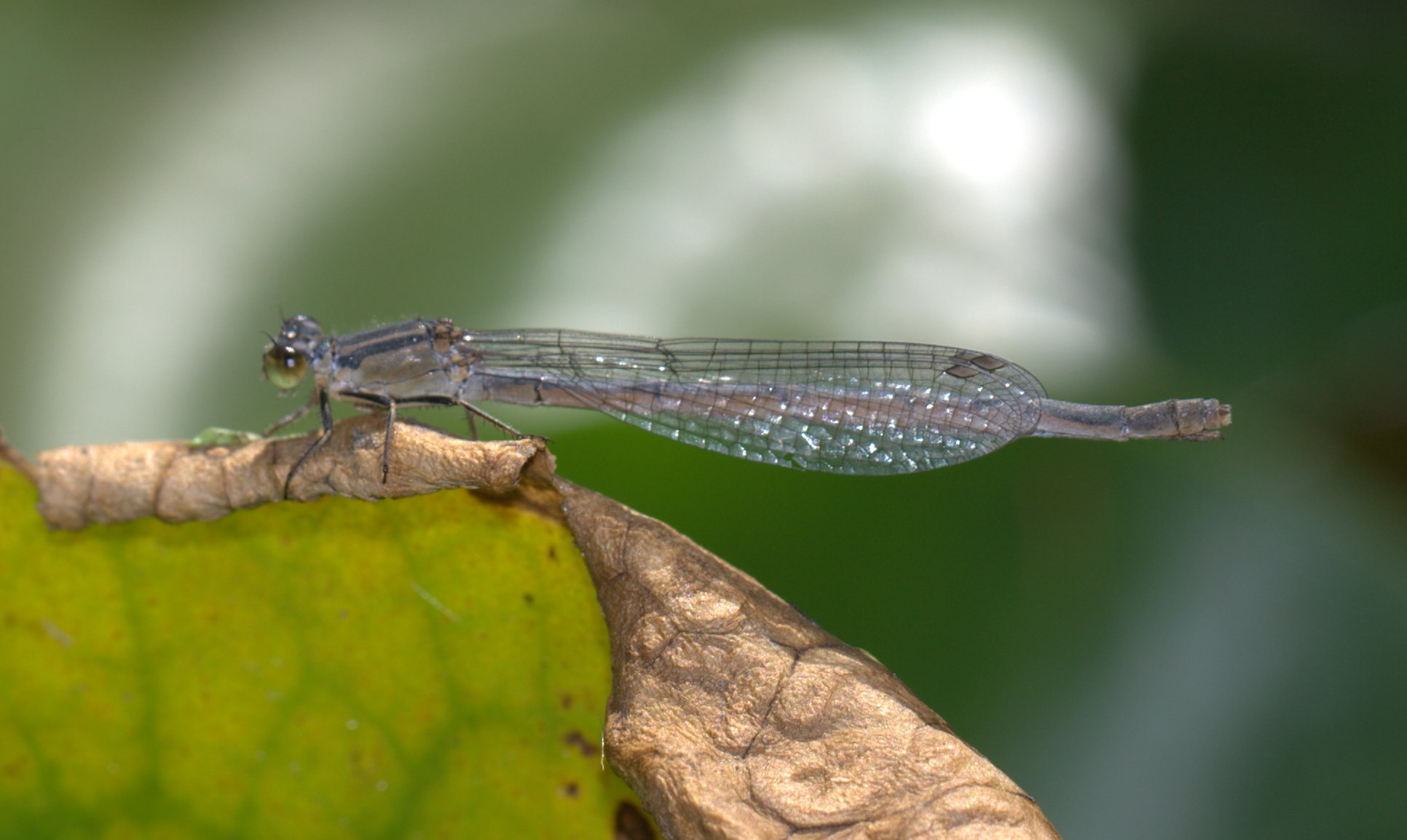
Female, brown form

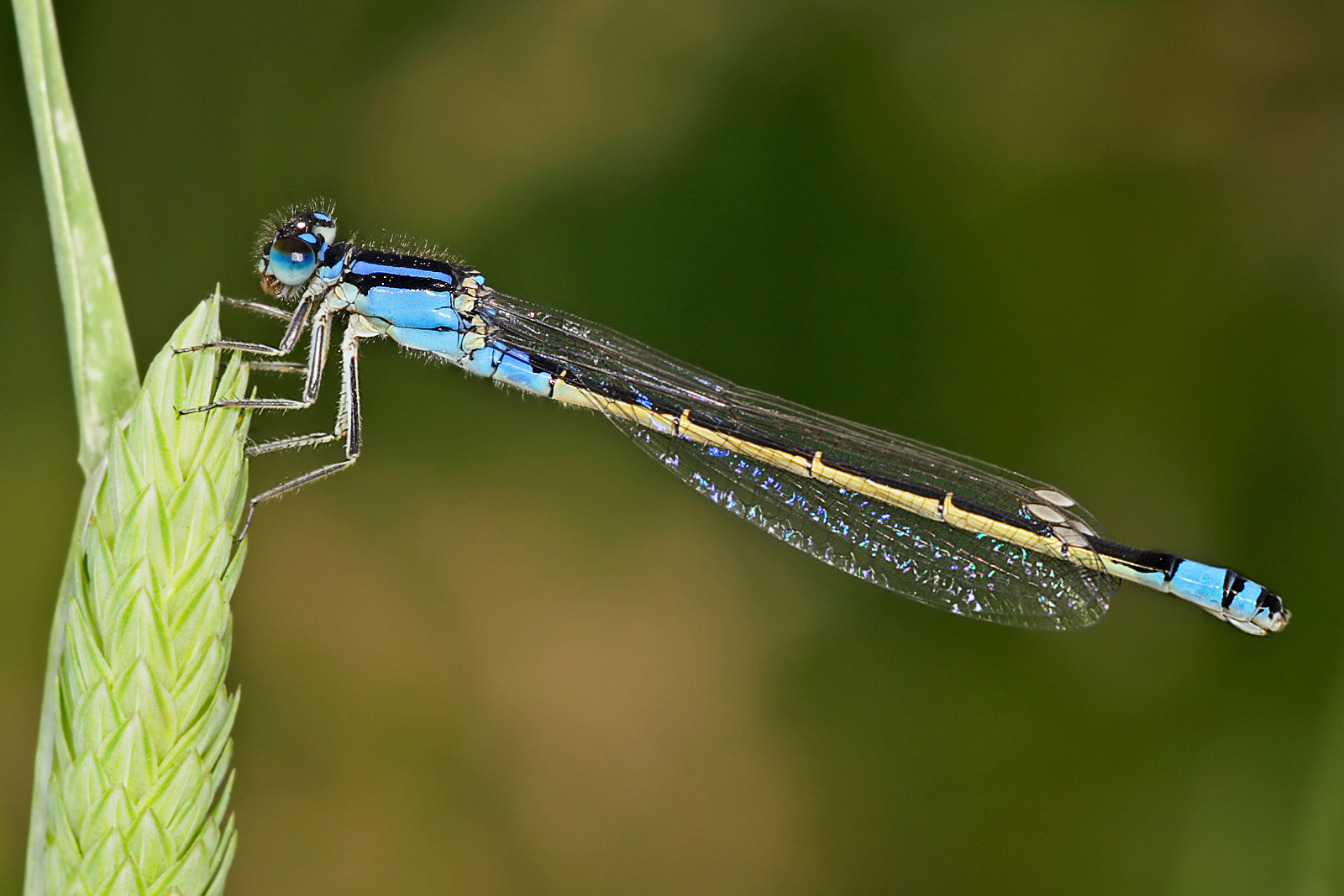
Female, blue form

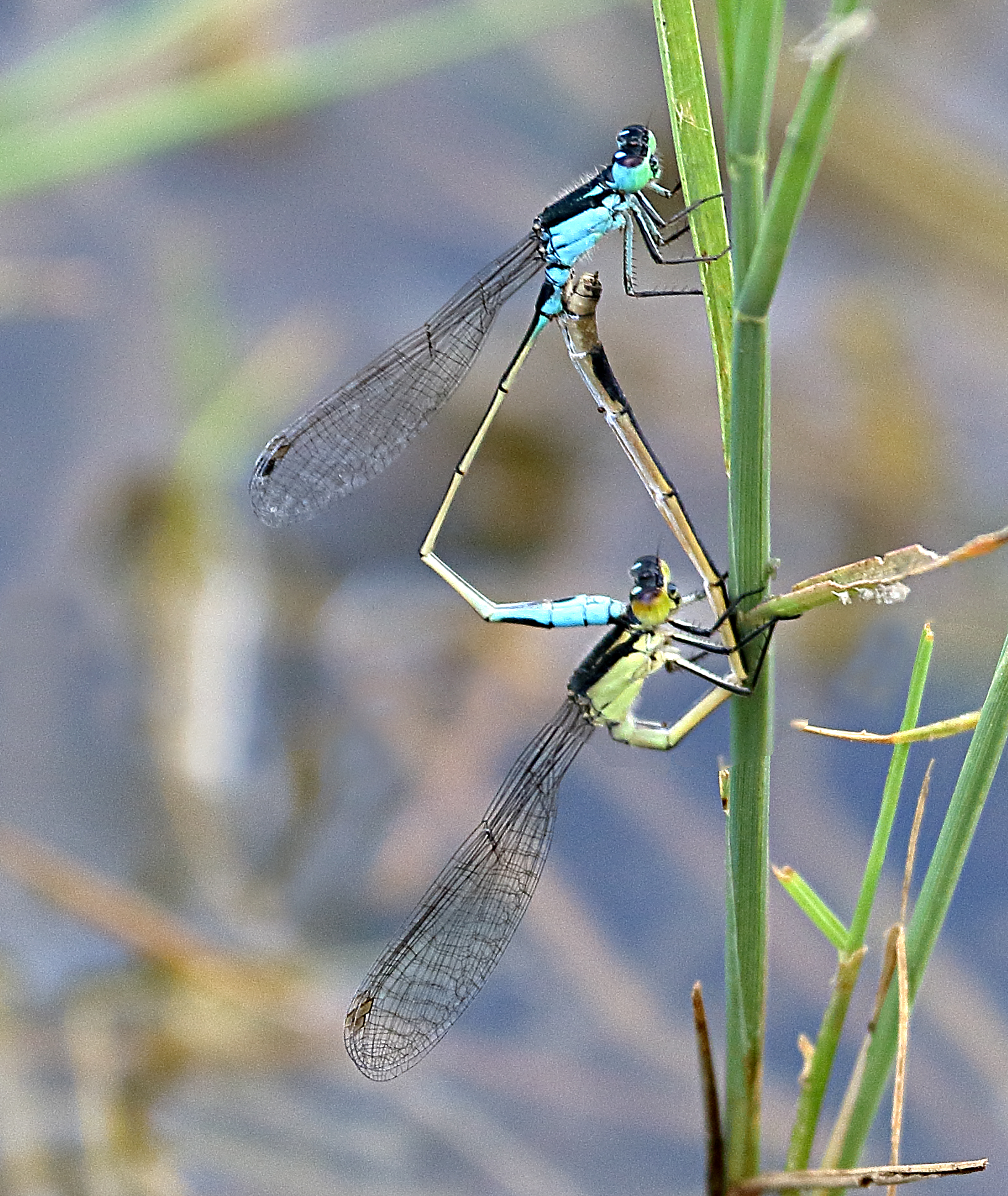
Common bluetails mating

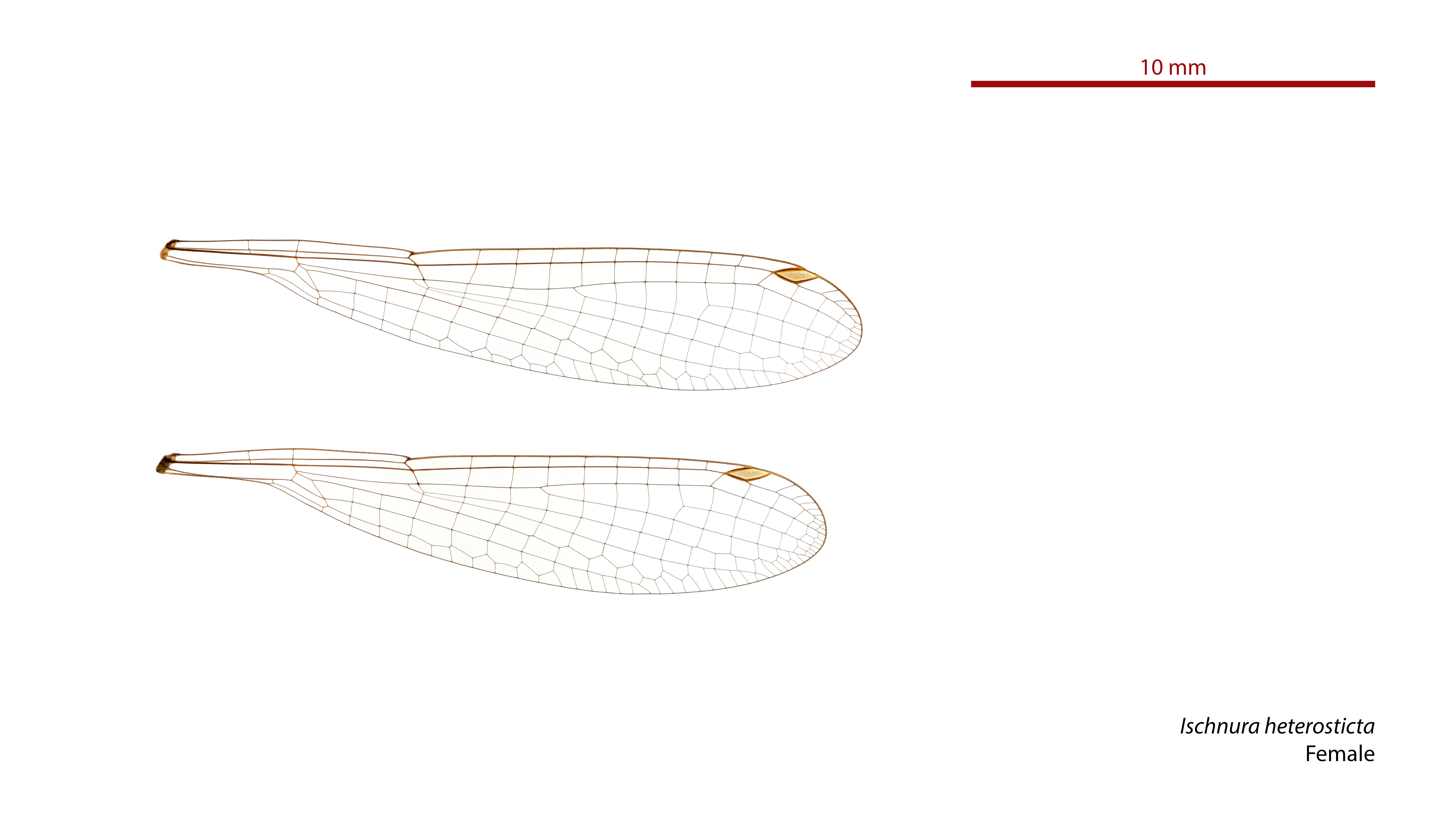
Female wings

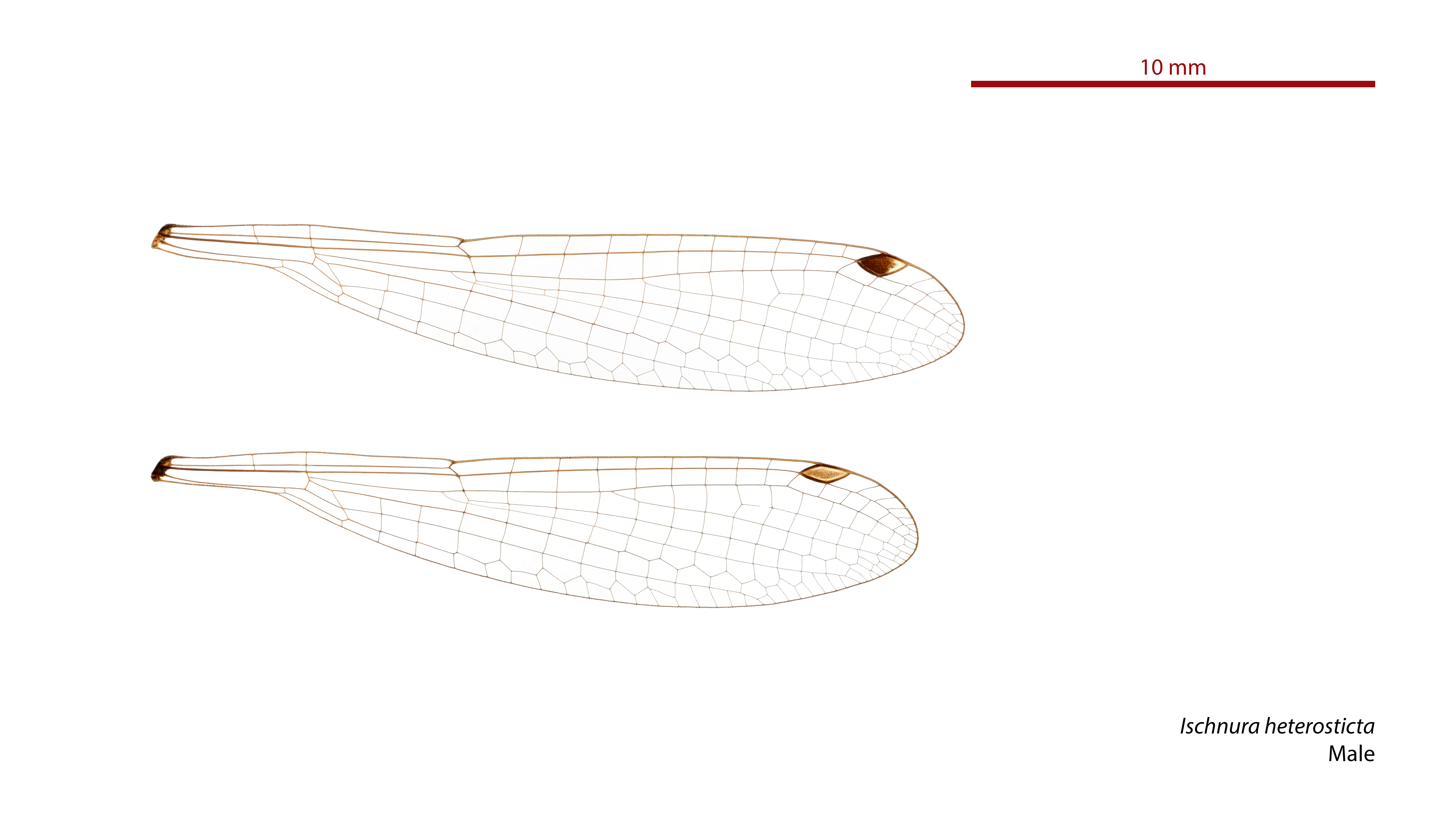
Male wings
