= King's Wood School =

Location
- Settle Road; Romford, Greater London, RM3 9XR; England; 51°36′37″N 0°14′25″E

Information
- Motto: "Believing is achieving"
- Established: 1973
- Closed: 2010
- Authority (Chair) Governor: Mr Jeff Stafford
- Headteacher: Mrs Marian Spinks
- Gender: Mixed
- Age: 11 to 16
- Enrolment: 800 (approx)
- Website: http://www.kingswood.havering.sch.uk/

King's Wood School was a secondary school in Harold Hill near Romford, London Borough of Havering, England. It was a mixed school of non-denominational religion. The School's last Headteacher was Mrs Marian Spinks, who had been the Headteacher since January 2008, returning from a secondment as Senior Inspector (Performance) with Havering Inspection and Advisory Service.

== History ==
The school was originally opened in 1953-54 as Harrowfield Secondary Modern School (there were separate boys' and girls' schools). Because of falling roll numbers, in 1973 Harrowfield was merged with the nearby Quarles School to form the Neave Comprehensive School; by 1976, all Quarles pupils had moved to the Harrowfield site.

King's Wood School was under special measures in 2004, but with the hard work of staff and students the school came out of special measures six months ahead of schedule and became a specialist technology college September 2007. Ofsted revisited the school to monitor progress and in March 2009 reported that sustained progress had been made across the school; results had risen rapidly over the last two years and the overall progress made by students was good. This was due to the strong leadership across the school and a community team ethos which continued to drive standards upwards.

== Exam results ==
In 2009, 27% of students achieved 5 A* to C passes at GCSE including English and Maths. In its final year, 2010, 42% did so.

== Sports ==
King's Wood School was known for its success in sports, particularly basketball, in which the team of 1999 - 2005 being King's Wood most successful Basketball team winning the Boroughs league in 2004 and runners up in 2005. The school came joint first in the borough for outdoor hockey and second in the borough for indoor hockey.

== Closure ==
In September 2010, King's Wood School closed, being replaced by Drapers' Academy on the same site.
