= Kingswood Secondary Academy =

Secondary Academy in Corby, UK

Location
- Gainsborough Road; Corby, Northamptonshire, NN18 9NS; England; 52.478°N 0.733°W

Information
- Type: Academy
- Established: 1965; 61 years ago
- Local authority: North Northamptonshire
- Trust: Greenwood Academies
- Department for Education URN: 139957 Tables
- Ofsted: Reports
- Principal: Matthew Gamble
- Gender: Coeducational
- Age: 11 to 18
- Enrolment: 1188
- Capacity: 1302
- Student to teacher ratio: 18:1
- Colours: Black and Purple
- Website: Kingswood Secondary Academy

Kingswood Secondary Academy (formerly The Kingswood School) is a coeducational secondary school and sixth form with academy status, located in Corby, Northamptonshire, England. It is sponsored by the Greenwood Academies Trust.

== History ==
=== Grammar school ===
The school was established as a grammar school in 1965 with 150 students. The first head of Kingswood Grammar School was Alan Bradley, in 1965; he had lived in Kenya. The school had 12 staff, 200 children.

=== Comprehensive ===
The school became comprehensive in 1971. Richard de Groot was the next headteacher, later the head of Shaftesbury Grammar School. Brian Tyler was the headteacher from January 1979, he taught English and Latin; his wife Margaret was a primary school teacher.

=== Television documentary ===
The school was the subject of a BBC documentary produced by Richard Denton. Filmed in 1981 and broadcast in 1982, it was made two years after Dawkins’ earlier sister documentary on public school Radley College.

It was a famous 1982 BBC TV series, first broadcast on Saturday 23 October 1982, bring filmed from April 1981. The BBC paid the school £1,750, which bought a minibus.

The headteacher Brian Tyler did not like private schools; he strongly believed that 'privileged' children should sit next to poor children. The documentary filmed seven candidates for the deputy headteacher, with one female from Cleethorpes, 43 year old Margaret Beardsley, the head of English at Arthur Mellows Village College, who attended Wintringham Grammar School. Peter Cooper was chosen as the deputy headteacher. The 1982 buildings have now been bulldozed. Parts of the documentary featured in the Open University programme 'The happiest days of your life', first shown April 1984.

Miss Mary Bevin, the deputy head since 1965, from Coalville, later lived at Wilbarston, and worked with the Soroptimist International movement; she retired in July 1981. On 18 February 1983, the headteacher appeared on the BBC Radio 4 Any Questions?, in Wellingborough, with Labour MP Judith Hart, Conservative MP Julian Critchley, and businessman Sir Alex Jarratt, and again on 9 September 1983 in the Isles of Scilly, with Jessica Mann and John Alderson (police officer). Mr Tyler retired as headteacher in July 1998. Mr Tyler would later live in Great Easton, Leicestershire, and not only opposed private schools, but ardently opposed grammar schools as well, which he described as 'privileging the children of the middle class'. In the 1983 and 1987 elections, the Liberal candidate for Corby was 40 year old (Terence) Glynn Whittington, from Weldon, the head of social science at the school, since 1973; he originated from the Forest of Dean, with a University of London degree.

=== 1987 arson attack ===
A £200,000 arson attack took place in 1987. A new £70,000 music block, would open on 27 March 1989, to replace the building destroyed in the fire.

The school governors campaigned in 1989 against a new £10m CTC school planned for Great Oakley, Northamptonshire in 1991, as it would attract much better funding, being described as 'elitism bought by cash'.

=== Grant maintained school ===
The school had its 25th anniversary in 1990. In November 1990 the school balloted parents whether to go grant maintained, and voted for the GM option; it opted out in September 1991.

The Kingswood School was designated a Specialist Arts College in September 2004 after grades were excelling in subjects related to the performing arts. (Dance, Drama, Art, Music and Media Studies)

=== New buildings ===
The school now has over 1,200 students operating on the new school site. Many changes have taken place in the past two years with the introduction of a new school uniform, vertical tutoring, and a new building.

In 2008 Kingswood saw its highest GCSE pass rate at 54%.

The school used to operate on two sites; the Upper School site, which was for students between the ages of 11–16, and the Lower School, which was once Our Lady and Pope John Catholic Secondary School. The school was taken over by Kingswood in 2004 and its students were then mixed with The Kingswood School's pupils. The Lower School site was then used as a sixth form centre. The disused Our Lady and Pope John site underwent demolition from November 2012, following an arson attack on the site in August 2012. The School is now on one site in the new building.

=== Academy ===
The school converted to academy status on 1 September 2013 and was renamed Kingswood Secondary Academy.

== The new school ==
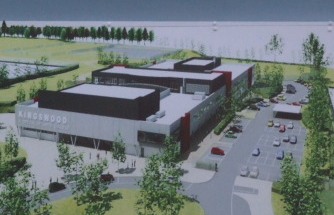
Graphic model of the new site

The school was established as a grammar school in 1965, starting with 150 students. The school now serves over 1,200 students in its current facility. Numerous changes have occurred over a specific period, including the introduction of a uniform, vertical tutoring, and a facility upgrade. The school was featured in a BBC documentary produced by Richard Denton, filmed in 1981 and aired in 1982, two years following Dawkins' previous documentary about Radley College.
