= Stapleford Abbotts =

Village in Essex, England

Coordinates: 51°37′51″N 0°10′37″E

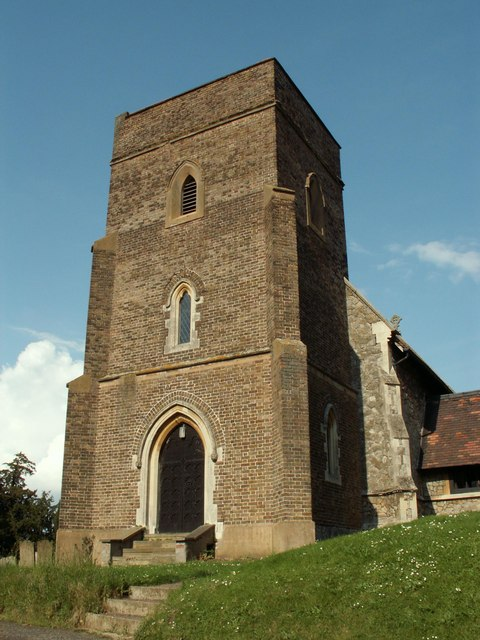
- Church of St Mary; Grade II architecturally listed

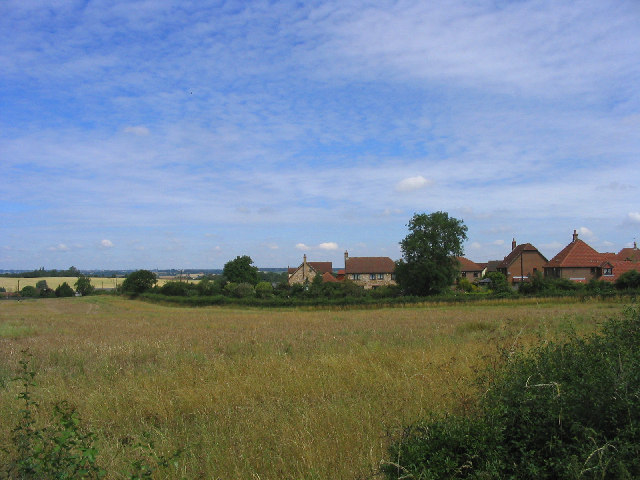
- Tysea Hill, Stapleford Abbots

- Location within Essex
- Interactive map of Stapleford Abbotts
- Area: 9.57 km^{2} (3.69 sq mi)
- Population: 1,123 (Parish, 2021)
  - Density: 117/km^{2} (300/sq mi)
- OS grid reference: TQ505955
  - London: 16.2 mi (26.1 km) SW
- Civil parish: Stapleford Abbotts
- District: Epping Forest
- Shire county: Essex
- Region: East
- Country: England
- Sovereign state: United Kingdom
- Post town: ROMFORD
- Postcode district: RM4
- Dialling code: 01708
- Police: Essex
- Fire: Essex
- Ambulance: East of England
- UK Parliament: Brentwood and Ongar

Stapleford Abbotts is a village and civil parish in the Epping Forest district of Essex, approximately 5.5 mi (9 km) SW of Ongar, 4.5 mi (7 km) N of Romford and 5 mi (8 km) SSE of Epping. The whole parish is within the M25 motorway. At the 2021 census the parish had a population of 1,123.

== History ==
The name of the parish arose because the principal manor was held by the Abbey of Bury St Edmunds from before the Norman Conquest to the Dissolution. A story is recorded in the abbey's registers that the lord of the manor was miraculously cured of a lingering illness in 1013 by the body of St Edmund as it passed back to Bury Abbey from London. In gratitude for being cured, he gave the manor to the abbey, either then or some time later. After the dissolution of the monasteries the manor was in the hands of Sir Brian Tuke and was included when he sold Pyrgo to King Henry VIII in 1544 although Navestock and Stapleford were both subsequently leased to George and Walter Cely, relatives of John Cely who had previously been Paler of the Park of Havering Palace at Havering-atte-Bower.

The population rose from 320 in 1801 to 507 in 1831, then fluctuated within that range until 1921 when it was 391. In the 20th century, there was a gradual increase in population due to new building in the area from the 1930s onwards. In 1951, the population was 731.

Historically Stapleford Abbotts was included in the hundred of Ongar. It formed part of the Ongar Rural District Council from 1894 until that authority was absorbed into Epping and Ongar Rural District Council in 1955. Since the local-government reorganisation of 1974, it has been part of Epping Forest District. The present civil parish retains largely the same boundaries as the parish of the mid-19th century.

== Events ==
In September 1927, the village was the scene of the murder of Police Constable George Gutteridge, who was shot at the roadside by two car thieves, Frederick Browne and William Kennedy, who were later hanged for their crime. Gutteridge Lane is named in his memory.

== Geography ==
The parish is mostly rural and agricultural with a scattering of farms and cottages, much of it is Metropolitan Green Belt protected land. The northern boundary of the parish is formed by the River Roding. The remainder of the parish is crossed by streams that feed into it or form the headwater of the River Rom. The terrain is hilly and 28–90 m (92–295 ft) above sea level (AOD) with most between 35 and 80 m (115 and 262 ft).

The village itself is a straggle of mostly 20th-century housing stretching for about a mile along the elevated Romford to Ongar road from the boundary with Havering-atte-Bower. The medieval church (largely rebuilt in the 19th century) is situated in a relatively isolated position a further mile away from what is now the village, reflecting the fact that it had no single nucleus until the 20th century.

Apart from the village of Stapleford Abbotts, the parish includes the hamlets of Bournebridge, Nuper's Hatch and a small part of Passingford Bridge. Two places use the village's name outside of it: Stapleford Flight Centre which provides sightseeing flights and Stapleford Abbotts Golf Course (see below).

== Localities ==
=== Bournebridge ===
Adjoining a farm on the main street to the south is the Bournebridge hamlet. The actual Bourne Bridge crosses the Bourne Brook, which later becomes the River Rom. The one Grade II listed building in the hamlet is the Old The School House. Otherwise it consists of fewer than 20 homes and farms.

=== Nuper's Hatch ===
This hamlet ranges in altitude from 60 to 82 m (197 to 296 ft) compared to the village centre's 55 m (180 ft) average. It consists of at least 60 properties centred on Nuper's and Lyng's Farm, in particular the neighbourhood and linear development of Tysea Hill. On the Tysea Hill ridge is Stapleford Abbotts Golf Course, which is across an almost straight north–south divide in the Borough of Brentwood. Six other farms adjoin the main road here, using a hilly terrain. Curtismill Green itself is in the parish, along with a few cottages, including the grade II listed Honeysuckle Cottage. However, most of the hamlet is in Navestock.

== Transport ==
Buses are limited in the area, served by the single Route 375.

| Route Number | Route | Via | Operator | Operational details |
|---|---|---|---|---|
| 375 | Passingford Bridge to Romford station. | Havering-atte-Bower, Collier Row. | Arriva Southend . | Mon-Sat every 90 minutes. London Buses service. Times |

The nearest railway station is at Romford. There are frequent mainline services from its station to London and East Anglia.

Bus route 575 ran a limited service from Harlow but ended operations in 2021.

== Notes and references ==
Notes
