= Havering Park =

Havering Park could refer to

- Havering Country Park
- Havering Park (ward) of the London Borough of Havering
- Estate of Havering Palace
