= Havering (disambiguation) =

Havering is a London borough.

Havering may also refer to:

- Havering-atte-Bower, a place in the London borough
- Havering Palace, an old royal residence in England
- Royal Liberty of Havering, a historical entity, surrounding Havering Palace, from which the borough was named
- Havering (electoral division), Greater London Council

== See also ==
The dictionary definition of haver at Wiktionary
