= Hornchurch Priory =

Priory in Havering, London, England

- Location within Greater London

Monastery information
- Established: 1158/9
- Disestablished: 1391
- Mother house: Hospital of St Nicholas and St Bernard
- Dedication: St Nicolas and St Bernard
- Controlled churches: St Andrew, Hornchurch; St Andrew, Romford; St Mary, Havering

Architecture
- Status: Demolished

Site
- Location: Hornchurch, England
- Coordinates: 51.561619°N 0.226011°E
- Visible remains: None

Hornchurch Priory was an alien priory in Hornchurch, now in the London Borough of Havering. It was founded in 1158/9 on land donated by Henry II. The priory later amassed additional land holdings. For over 200 years the priory dominated the spiritual life of Havering as well as acting as landlord over much of Hornchurch. Its lands were seized by the Crown in 1385 and bought for New College, Oxford in 1391.

== History ==
In 1158/9 Henry II of England donated around 1,500 acres (6.1 km^{2}) of land to the south of Hornchurch village (Suttons Manor) to the Hospital of St Nicholas and St Bernard. In 1163 the St Andrew's Church and adjacent land (Hornchurch Hall manor) was given by Henry II to the priory. The house was established on this land to the north of the church and was dedicated to St Nicholas and St Bernard. Land holdings were increased by 360 acres (1.5 km^{2}) gifted by local landowners.

It was the only cell of the mother house in England. It was small, typically with four to eight members and never more than ten. Some accounts refer to the priory as a hospital, although there is no evidence it provided healthcare.

The priory claimed exclusive spiritual authority within the ancient parish of Hornchurch (otherwise known as the manor of Havering), providing priests for the church in Hornchurch and the chapels in Romford and Havering-atte-Bower.

The priory lands were seized by the Crown as a consequence of the Great Schism. The Parliament of England authorised the king to confiscate the property of alien religious houses that supported the Avignon Papacy in 1379. Notice was given by 1384. The members of the priory left the house in 1385 and the property was confiscated.

The lands were purchased in 1391 by William of Wykeham for the endowment of New College, Oxford. The site of the priory became Hornchurch Hall.

It has been suggested that the priory is the origin of the Hornchurch placename because the priory used a bulls-head seal on official documents. However, the seal derives from the name and does not provide the origin.
