= Chase Cross =

District in London, England

Coordinates: 51.601373°N 0.174419°E

- Location within Greater London
- London borough: Havering
- Ceremonial county: Greater London
- Region: London
- Country: England
- Sovereign state: United Kingdom
- Post town: ROMFORD
- Postcode district: RM1/RM5
- Dialling code: 01708
- Police: Metropolitan
- Fire: London
- Ambulance: London
- UK Parliament: Romford
- London Assembly: Havering and Redbridge

Chase Cross is a district of the London Borough of Havering in London, England. Chase Cross lies 0.8 miles (1.3 km) east of Collier Row, 15 miles (24 km) northeast of Charing Cross and just under 2 miles (3.2 km) north of Romford. The name is thought to come from its position as a crossroads in the chase (hunting ground) or Hainault Forest. The forest was cleared for agriculture in the 1850s, before being developed for housing in the 1930s.

== Transport ==
The B175 is the main road through Chase Cross between Passingford Bridge and the A12 in Romford. The A12 (Eastern Avenue), which runs 1 mile south of Collier Row at its southern end, leads to London and the east coast of Essex and East Anglia, crossing the M25 on its eastern section. The area is not connected to the London Underground or National Rail networks; however, Hainault station, Newbury Park station (Central line) and Romford railway station are nearby. Transport for London bus routes 103, 499, 651 and 375 serve Chase Cross.

== Nearby places ==
- Romford
- Collier Row
- Havering-atte-Bower
- Harold Hill
- Chigwell Row
