= Bedfords (ward) =

Electoral ward in the London Borough of Havering

- Former electoral ward for the Havering London Borough Council
- Borough: Havering
- County: Greater London
- Population: 9,080 (1966 estimate)
- Electorate: 6,202 (1964); 6,004 (1968); 6,386 (1971); 6,349 (1974)
- Major settlements: Havering-atte-Bower, Rise Park
- Area: 1,751.7 acres (7.089 km^{2})

Former electoral ward
- Created: 1965
- Abolished: 1978
- Councillors: 2
- Replaced by: Chase Cross, Rise Park
- Name origin: Bedfords Park

External image
- Map showing Bedfords ward boundaries from 1965 to 1978

Bedfords was an electoral ward in the London Borough of Havering from 1965 to 1978. The ward was first used in the 1964 elections and last used for the 1974 elections. It returned two councillors to Havering London Borough Council. The ward covered Rise Park and Havering-atte-Bower. For elections to the Greater London Council, the ward was part of the Havering electoral division from 1965 and then the Romford division from 1973. The ward was only represented by Conservative Party councillors. It was named after Bedfords Park.

== List of councillors ==
The ward was represented by two councillors.

Term	Councillor	Party
1964–1968	Evan Davies	Conservative
1974–1978	Evan Davies	Conservative
1964–1968	Stanley Shute	Conservative
1968–1978	C. Kemp	Conservative
1968–1974	F. Orrin	Conservative

== Havering council elections ==
=== 1974 election ===
The election took place on 2 May 1974.

1974 Havering London Borough Council election: Bedfords (2)
Party	Candidate	Votes	%	±%
Conservative	Evan Davies	1,441		
Conservative	C. Kemp	1,351		
Liberal	T. Hurlstone	764		
Liberal	G. Jacobs	585		
Labour	E. Taylor	466		
Labour	D. Ainsworth	449		
Turnout				
Conservative hold		Swing		
Conservative hold		Swing		

=== 1971 election ===
The election took place on 13 May 1971.

1971 Havering London Borough Council election: Bedfords (2)
Party	Candidate	Votes	%	±%
Conservative	C. Kemp	1,349		
Conservative	F. Orrin	1,289		
Labour	A. Mills	928		
Labour	Denis O'Flynn	908		
Independent	J. Squire	411		
Turnout				
Conservative hold		Swing		
Conservative hold		Swing		

=== 1968 by-election ===
The by-election took place on 27 June 1968. The by-election followed Evan Davies and Stanley Shute becoming aldermen on the council.

1968 Bedfords by-election
Party	Candidate	Votes	%	±%
Conservative	F. Orrin	968		
Conservative	C. Kemp	967		
Ind. Residents	L. Jackson	137		
Labour	A. Mills	128		
Labour	C. Connor	123		
Ind. Residents	R. Vickers	123		
Turnout				
Conservative hold		Swing		
Conservative hold		Swing		

=== 1968 election ===
The election took place on 9 May 1968.

1968 Havering London Borough Council election: Bedfords (2)
Party	Candidate	Votes	%	±%
Conservative	Evan Davies	2,013		
Conservative	Stanley Shute	1,998		
Labour	H. Packham	333		
Labour	A. Mills	321		
Turnout				
Conservative hold		Swing		
Conservative hold		Swing		

=== 1964 election ===
The election took place on 7 May 1964.

1964 Havering London Borough Council election: Bedfords (2)
Party	Candidate	Votes	%	±%
Conservative	Evan Davies	1,600		
Conservative	Stanley Shute	1,587		
Labour	H. Sherlock	765		
Labour	F. Wood	748		
Independent	T. Hunt	299		
Independent	D. Bates	281		
Turnout		2,683	43.3	
Conservative win (new seat)				
Conservative win (new seat)				
