= Bower House =

Mansion in Havering-atte-Bower, London

Coordinates: 51.612°N 0.183°E

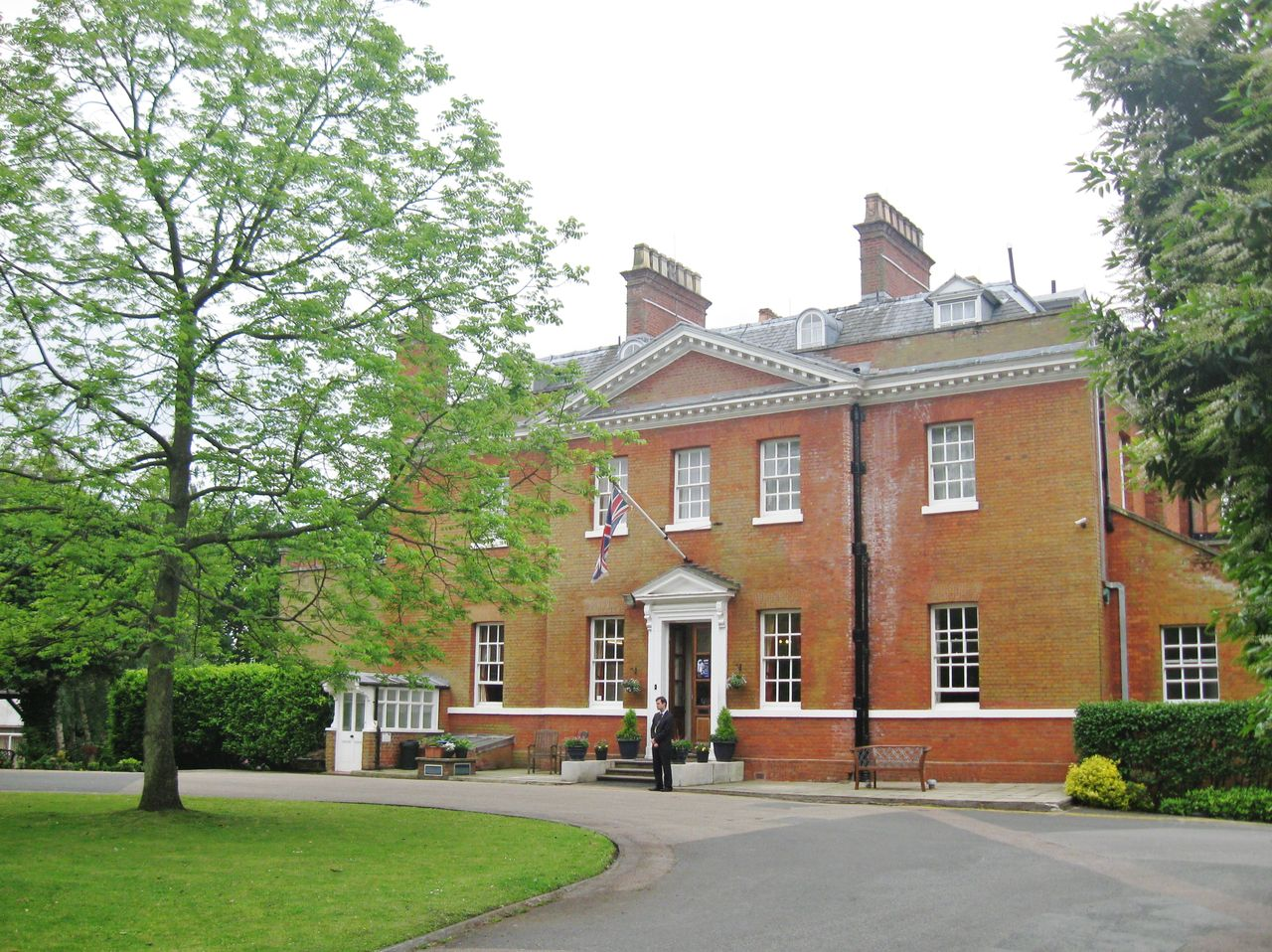
The Bower House

The Bower House (/ˈbaʊər/) is a Grade I listed Palladian mansion in Havering-atte-Bower, England. It was built in 1729 by Henry Flitcroft, and was his first commission. The stable block was built at the same time and is separately grade I listed. Landscape architect Charles Bridgeman designed the grounds and possibly the stable block. The mansion incorporated architectural items salvaged from the ruined Havering Palace. The staircase features murals by James Thornhill.

It remained a private home until 1976 when it was purchased by the Ford Motor Company. It is currently used as a Christian training centre. The house forms part of the Open House London festival.
