= Pyrgo Park =

Coordinates: 51.6195°N 0.1990°E

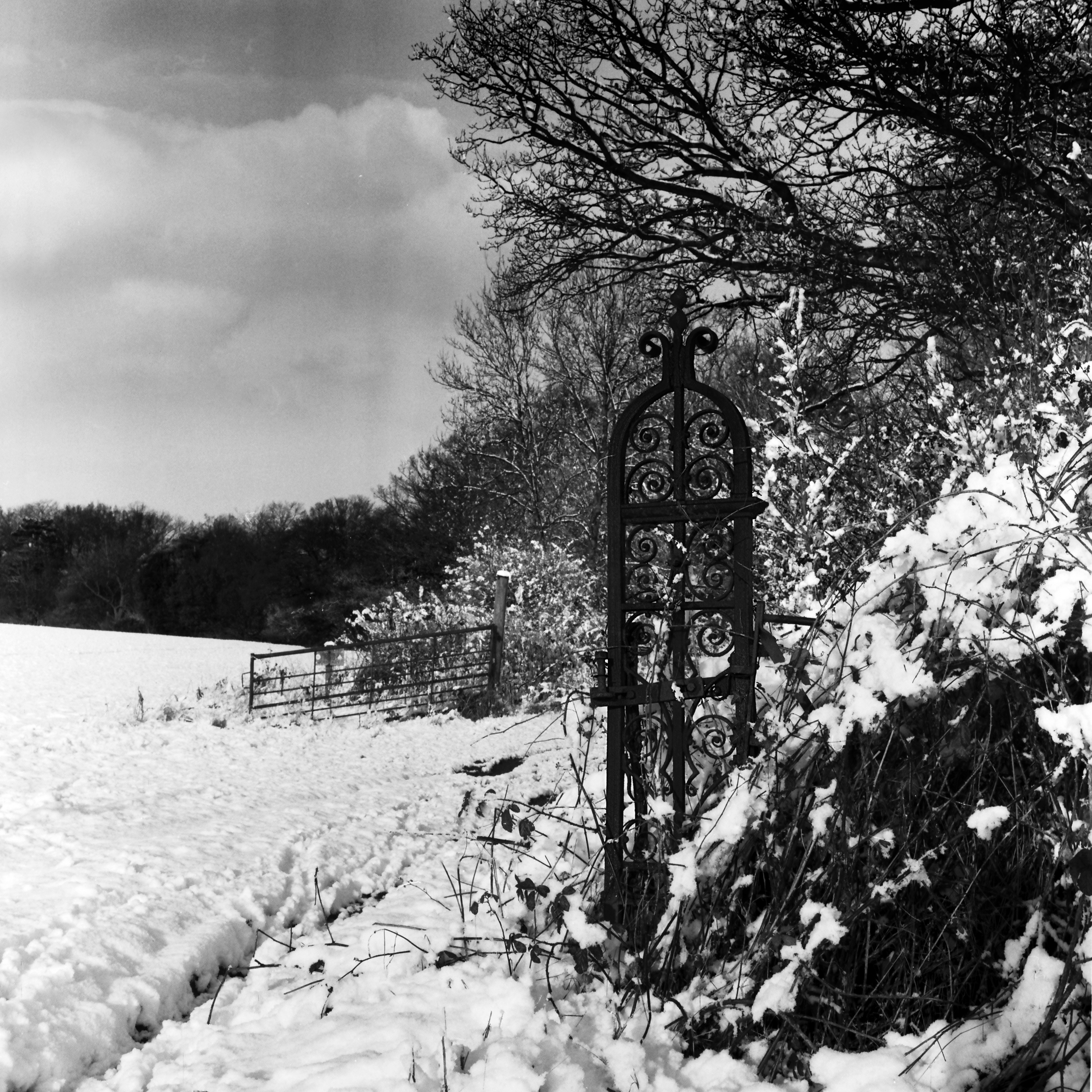
An iron gatepost at the entrance of Pirgo Place, a remnant of the 19th-century mansion, pictured in 2010

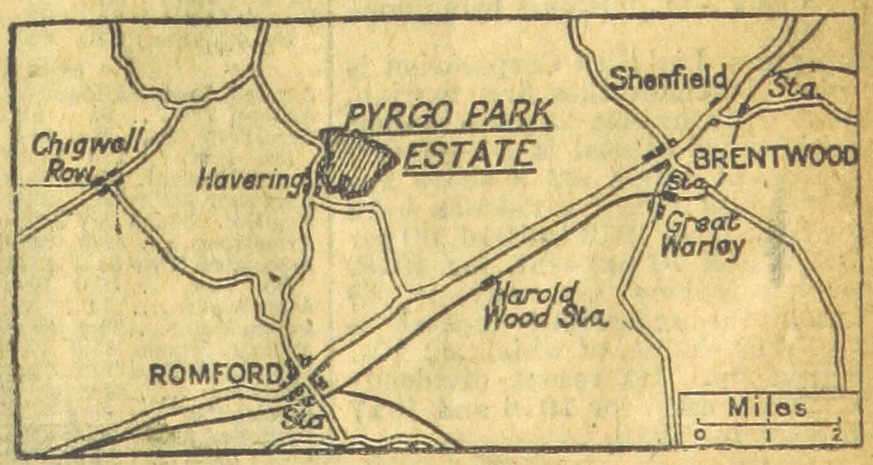
1889 map of the estate

Pyrgo Park is a park at Havering-atte-Bower in the London Borough of Havering, England. It is the site of the former Pirgo Palace, built before 1540 and demolished by 1814; and of Pyrgo House, built 1852, which lasted less than a century.

Pyrgo is one of three large parklands in Havering-atte-Bower, the others being Bedfords Park and Havering Country Park.

== Toponymy ==
Purgore is first recorded in 1490 and probably means 'triangular plot of land where pear trees grow'. It is formed from Old English pyrige (peartree) and 'gāra' (a triangular piece of land). Pergore Park is first recorded in 1544 but Portegore and Portegoo were also used in the 16th century. The modern form was recognisable as Pergo Park in 1805, but Pirgo, Purgo and Pyrgo are all variants found. Ordnance Survey maps have shown Pyrgo for at least the last 100 years.

== Pirgo Palace ==
Pirgo, spelt Portegore by Henry VIII's officials, was a royal residence of King Henry VIII, from 1541, situated nearby the royal palace of Havering in the liberty of Havering-atte-Bower. Providing a pleasing position on a gentle ridge barely twenty easy miles from London with wide views westwards, the Havering area had more than six centuries of association with royalty. King Edward the Confessor (1003–1066) is said to have been disturbed there at his devotions by nightingales and prayed successfully for their banishment from Havering Park, this legend being first recorded by William Camden in his Remaines. Havering Palace continued to be used by successive monarchs until 1638 and Havering Park remained with the Crown until 1828.

=== King Henry VIII and Pirgo ===
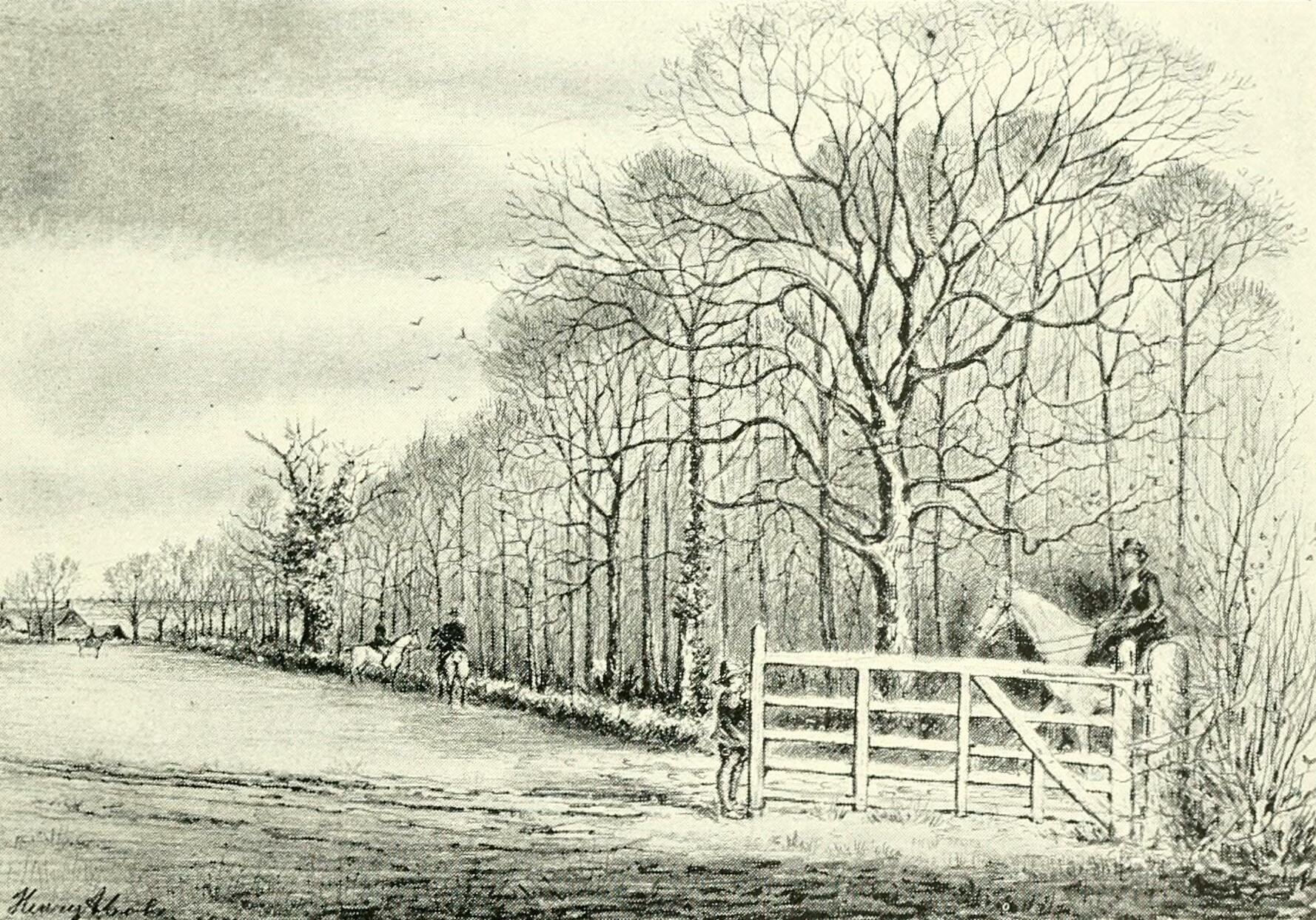
1900 illustration of hunting at Pyrgo Wood

In 1537 the King's Steward, Sir Brian Tuke, constructed a park with 200 acres (81 ha) of open land and 100 acres (40 ha) of woods at Pirgo, north-east of Havering village and Henry made it his personal property. The Steward was allowed to continue living at Pirgo until about 1541 after which Henry VIII had the mansion repaired and completed the enclosure of Pirgo. Henry summoned his estranged daughters, Mary and Elizabeth, to his new country house at Pirgo in 1542, and being pleased with them he made the decision to restore them to the succession to the Throne.

=== Owners and residents after Henry VIII ===
Neither Edward VI or Mary visited Pyrgo after their accession to the throne and on 24 April 1559, only a few months into her reign, Queen Elizabeth gave the manor with its royal residence to her second cousin Lord John Grey, uncle of Lady Jane Grey and only surviving son of the 2nd Marquess of Dorset in response to his plea of poverty. Pyrgo was inherited by Lord John Grey's son Henry, later 1st Baron Grey of Groby and his grandson Henry Grey, later Earl of Stamford, sold Pirgo Palace in 1621 to Sir Thomas Cheek who died in 1659.

The manor then passed through various descendants but ultimately to his granddaughter Ann, daughter of Thomas Cheeke, and wife of Sir Thomas Tipping. His younger daughter, Katherine, married Thomas Archer, 1st Baron Archer. In 1790 the trustees of their four granddaughters sold Pirgo to Edward R Howe.

Later residents included Albert Fytche and the widowed Alice Towneley, Baroness O'Hagan.

=== Architecture ===
The first available description dates from 1594 when the former royal residence was described as "a fair house", shown on a map dated about 25 years later as a large gabled-building. In 1670 taxes were paid on 30 hearths. The site, on which terracing of the gardens was still visible after World War I, was northwest of the surviving farm buildings and was partly excavated in 1972.

The Pirgo estate included a domestic chapel housing Grey family tombs, and memorials to several members of the Cheke (Cheek) family. All the Cheke remains were removed to Havering-atte-Bower parish church circa 1768.

. . . a tomb in the chapel of the mansion house at Pirgo in Essex; on which was a knight kneeling with four sons, his lady kneeling with four daughters, and many coats and quarterings; and bearing on the verge this inscription:

"Here under lyeth buried the lorde John . . . Grey, Knyght (fourth son of) the lorde Thomas Grey mar . . . . . ques Dorcet, who dyed the xix daye of November 1564; and dame Mary his wyfe, daughter of Sir Anthony Browne, Knyght of the Garter, mr of the horse, and con'seler to Kynge Henry ye VIII. Dame Mary dyed . . . ."

— Arthur Collins, Peerage of England, 1812

=== Demolition ===
Between about 1771 and 1778 the Archer family demolished the chapel and the wings of Pirgo House. It continued in use for a short time, but the remainder of the former royal residence seems to have been demolished by about 1814.

== New house ==
In 1852 a new mansion was built on the site. The house and 600 acres (2.4 km^{2}) of neighbouring farms were sold to Albert Fytche in 1873. The house came within the metropolitan green belt and was demolished by 1941.
