= Joseph Pemberton =

English priest and horticulturalist

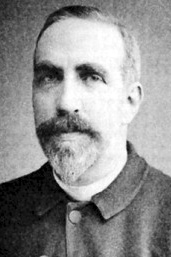

Joseph Pemberton (1852–1926) was a British rosarian, remembered for creating the hybrid musk class of cultivated roses.

== Career ==
The Reverend Joseph Hardwick Pemberton was born in 1852 in The Round House, Havering-atte-Bower, Romford, Essex; he lived there with his sister Florence until his death in 1926. He was an Anglican clergyman for more than 30 years. A keen amateur rose grower, he joined the Royal National Rose Society shortly after its founding, and in 1911 served as its president. After his retirement in 1914, Pemberton turned to rose breeding in an attempt to recreate the "Grandmother's roses" he recalled from childhood. He set up Pemberton Nursery at Romford and nearby where eventually some 35–40,000 roses were grown annually for sale. All the roses of the Pemberton Nursery were bequeathed to their gardeners, who at Romford were Jack and Ann Bentall. They released several new roses after Pemberton's death.

== Rose breeding ==
Using the climber 'Trier' (descended from 'Aglaia', itself an 1896 cross by Peter Lambert using Rosa multiflora), Pemberton crossed it with hybrid tea roses to produce a class of highly scented, generally cluster-flowered roses which remain popular garden material to this day. Initially he classed them also as hybrid teas, but later took to referring to them as 'hybrid musks', based upon a tenuous link between 'Trier' and Rosa moschata.

Pemberton also bred a number of more conventional hybrid teas, and several Multiflora ramblers still worth growing.

Hybrid Musks reached their apogee well after Pemberton's death. Reimer Kordes' universally grown 'Schneewittchen' ('Iceberg') of 1958 was bred from Pemberton's 'Robin Hood'.

== Selected Pemberton roses ==
Of the roses on the following list, 'Buff Beauty' is thought to have been bred by Pemberton but was actually introduced by Ann Bentall in 1939, some 13 years after Pemberton's death. 'Ballerina' was likewise introduced by her in 1937.

Name	Date	Colour	Pollen parent	Seed parent	Photo
Aurora	1923	Golden Yellow	Danae	Miriam	
Ballerina	1937	White-centered pink	Unknown	Unknown	
'Buff Beauty'	1939	Orange and yellow	William Allen Richardson	Unknown	
Ceres	1914	Yellow and pink	Unknown	Unknown	
Clytemnestra	1915	Chamois	Trier	Liberty	
Cornelia	1925	Deep Pink	Unknown	Unknown	
Danae	1913	Light yellow	Trier	Gloire de Chédane-Guinoisseau	
Daphne	1912	Light pink	Unknown	Unknown	
Daybreak	1918	Golden yellow	Trier	Liberty	
Felicia	1926	Pink blend	Trier	Ophelia	
Fortuna	1927	Light pink	Lady Pirrie	Nur Mahal	
Francesca	1922	Apricot	Danae	Sunburst	
Kathleen	1922	Blush	Daphne	Perle des Jardins	
Maid Marion	1930	Pink and white	Unknown	Unknown	
Moonlight	1913	Cream	Trier	Sulphurea	
Nur Mahal	1923	Crimson	Château de Clos Vougeot	Seedling	
Pax	1918	White	Trier	Sunburst	
Pemberton's White Rambler	1914	White	Unknown	Rosa multiflora	
Penelope	1924	Seashell pink	Ophelia	Seedling	
Prosperity	1919	White	Marie-Jeanne	Perle des Jardins	
Robin Hood	1927	Cherry red	Seedling	Miss Edith Cavell	
Sammy	1921	Carmine-red	Gruss an Teplitz	Trier	
Thisbe	1918	Buff	Marie-Jeanne	Perle des Jardins	
Vanity	1920	Deep pink	'Château de Clos Vougeot'	Seedling	
