= The Round House (Havering) =

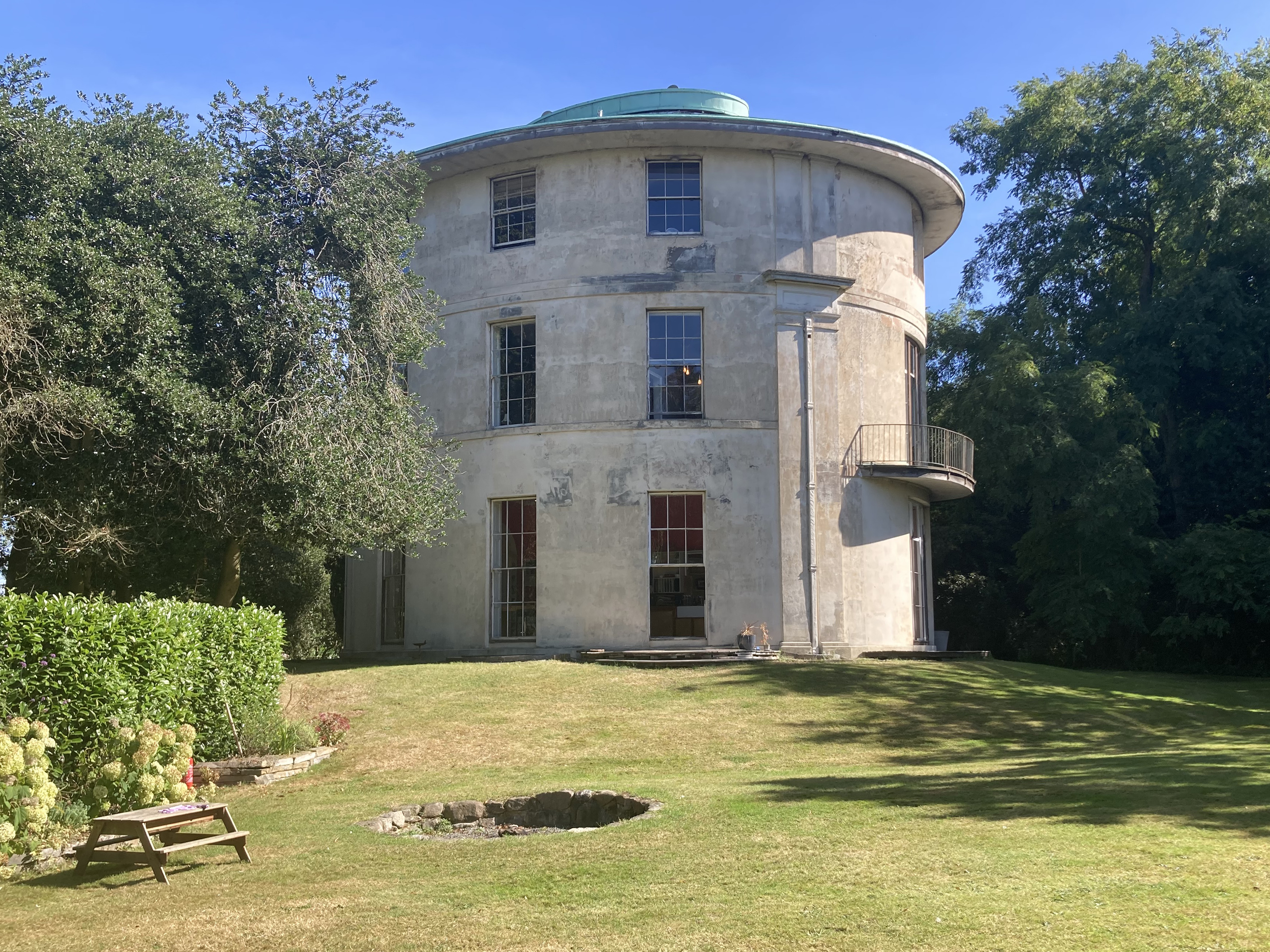
- The Round House in 2024

General information
- Location: Havering-atte-Bower, United Kingdom
- Coordinates: 51.6167°N 0.1867°E

The Round House is a Grade II* listed late Georgian elliptical stuccoed villa located on Broxhill Road in Havering-atte-Bower, London. The house was built between 1792 and 1794 by John Plaw for William Sheldon. It was later home to the rose breeder Joseph Pemberton.

The building now houses a residential recording studio called The Hideaway, created by Imogen Heap in 2006. It is open as part of the Open House London weekend.

The house was also the location of The Horne Section TV Show.
