= Bedfords Park =

Park and nature reserve in Havering, England

Coordinates: 51.6086°N 0.1920°E

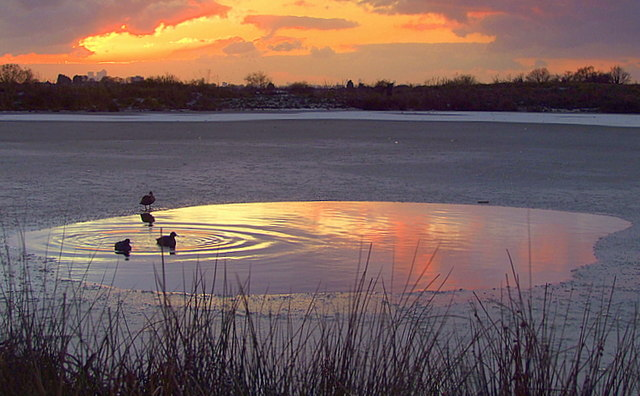
- Interactive map of Bedfords Park
- Type: Nature reserve
- Location: Havering-atte-Bower, Havering, Greater London
- OS grid: TQ 520 922
- Area: 87 hectares (210 acres)
- Manager: Havering Council

Bedfords Park is public open space of 215 acres or approximately 87½ hectares near Havering-atte-Bower in the London Borough of Havering in England. It is one of three large parklands around Havering-atte-Bower; the others are Havering Country Park and Pyrgo Park.

Bedfords Park is a Site of Metropolitan Importance for Nature Conservation and a local nature reserve. It was awarded a Green Flag Award in 2007 which was maintained at least until 2013. The site is managed by Havering Council and the visitor centre is managed by the Essex Wildlife Trust.

== Geography ==
Bedfords Park is situated on a south-facing slope, the top of which is 110 metres above sea level and affords views over east London and across the River Thames to Kent. The highest part of the park is on a ridge capped by a patch of Chalky Boulder Clay and it is this that allows the Round Pond to retain water. The park is made up of mixed parkland and deciduous woods and is much narrower on the ridge while broadening as you move down the slope in a southerly direction.

Vehicular access is gained on the north side of the park from Broxhill Road, while there is pedestrian access from Lower Bedfords Road on the southern edge of the park, and also using a permissive footpath from Orange Tree Hill.

== History ==
The land that makes up Bedfords Park originates in the two adjoining estates of Bedfords, believed to be named after the family of Robert de Bedford mentioned in 1285 and John Bedford who held the land in 1362, and Earls which later became known as Upper Bedfords. The latter was taken from John Derewin in 1212 by King John as forfeiture for homicide and given to William d'Aubigny, 3rd Earl of Arundel for the annual rent of one Sparrowhawk. The manor, which is one of the oldest in Havering and was one of four held in serjeanty, remained in the family at least until the time of the 5th Earl.

In 1452 Thomas Cooke (who was to become Lord Mayor of London 10 years later) took possession of the manor of Bedfords, having already acquired the 'manor or messuage' of Earls, and held these as part of the Gidea Hall estate. This continued for 200 years until 1659 after which the properties changed hands several times, being briefly part of Gobions Manor, but by 1678 the two estates were held by Robert Wolley. After being sold out of Gobions Manor, the ownership was in the hands of various London merchants until 1771 when it was sold by Nathaniel Houlton to a Mr John Heaton. During this time there is no evidence of the owners living in either manor.

== The mansion ==
John Heaton rebuilt the house at Bedfords as a two-storey brick mansion rendered with cement, and resided there until his death in 1818. Upper Bedfords (previously Earls) was also rebuilt during this time in a crenelated style, including a tower which has often caused it to be mistaken for a church. It was at this time (c. 1777) that the lane which had run from Broxhill Road to Lower Bedfords Road and going past Bedfords was closed by the owner. This is also the point at which today's park is recognisable as Chapman and Andre's survey of that time depicts the northern tree line, approach avenue, and park boundaries as they occur today. The property passed down two generations in the Heaton family, although it was let to tenants between 1826 and 1834. At this point the property again changed hands several times and was even listed in the Chelmsford Chronicle on 21 June 1867 (on page 4):

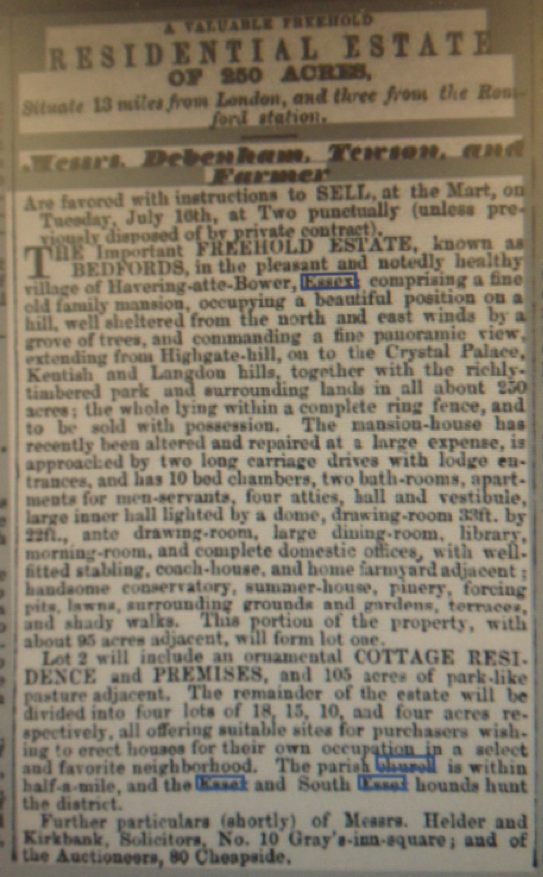
Bedfords Park for sale - 1867

It was purchased 3 years later from the mortgagee of the previous owner by Henry R. Stone in 1870. His son Henry J. Stone was the last lord of the manor, and although in parts, Bedfords was sold to Romford Urban District Council by his widow in 1933.

Romford UDC opened the park to the public in 1934, and instituted a museum in the house which locals seem to have referred to as Bedfords Mansion, this focussing on natural history and containing stuffed birds and animals from the local area. It was also around this time that a captive herd of red deer were introduced. During World War II Bedfords House was used by the Auxiliary Fire Service and afterwards was used as the council archive but was gradually allowed to fall into disrepair until it was demolished in 1959. In the 1960s a cafe was built on the site of the house until this also fell out of use in the 1980s.

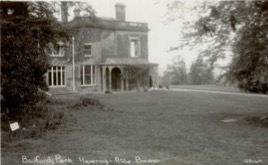
Bedfords Park Mansion - west-facing

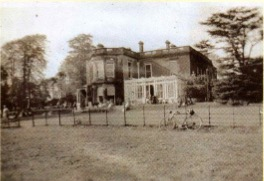

Today the route of the public lane closed around 1777 can still be traced along the entrance drive, past the old stable block (the only part of the house to survive), and then down the slope to the east of the visitor centre, the whole being characterised by the avenue of mature Horse Chestnut trees. The site of the house is now occupied by a Visitor Centre run by Essex Wildlife Trust.

== Queen Anne's Oak ==
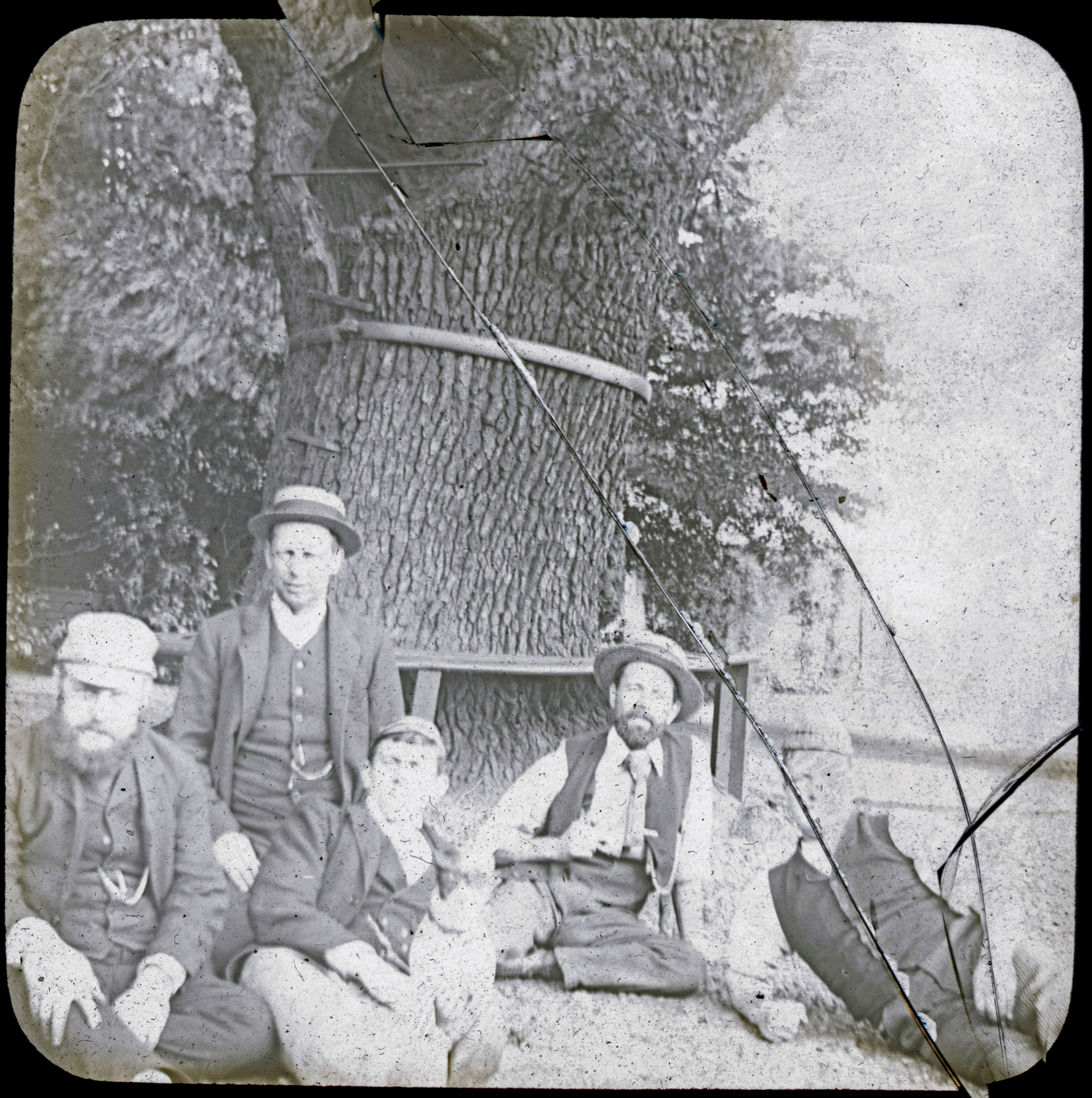
Queen Anne's Oak c.1860

This was an ancient oak tree that stood to the side of the mansion and the deer enclosure. The above is the earliest known photograph of the oak tree where legend has it, Queen Anne sat by this tree on her visits to the estate. That is why the estate took this concerted effort to help keep the tree alive for so long; including bricking around the base of the tree and bracing it with metal belts. It is also mentioned in the Romford Then and Now publication from 2005 where it mentions:

The "Old Preserved Oak Tree" Syd mentioned was known as the "Queen Anne Oak". Because of its increased deterioration (it had more wooden support and brickwork than its own timber!) Council decided to remove it in the late 1980s. However the Mayor planted a replacement Oak Tree close by - with a plaque which commemorated the Old (about 400 year old) tree. Acorns were also gathered from the Old tree by pupils of Dame Tipping School, Havering Village. They potted the acorns with a view to growing young oaks for later planting. Could I please ask that somebody still living close to Romford contact the school to see if any of the Oaks, descendants of the "Queen Anne Oak" were ever planted and, if so, where?

A new oak tree was planted on the actual site of the tree to commemorate its memory in 2015.

== See also ==
- Havering parks and open spaces
- Bedfords (ward)
