= St Andrew's Church, Hornchurch =

Coordinates: 51.560°N 0.226°E

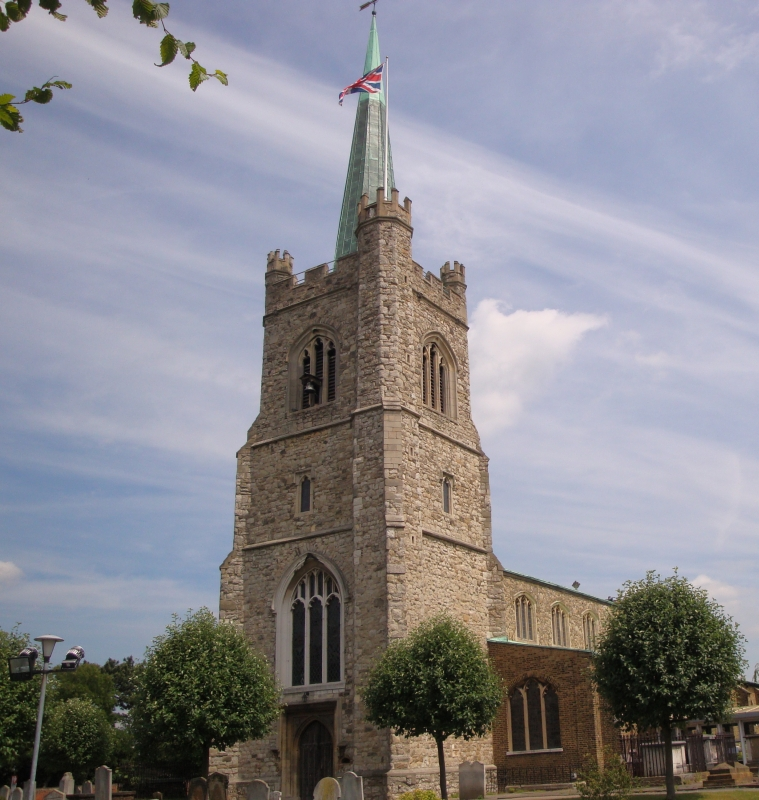
- St Andrew's Church, Hornchurch
- St Andrew's Church, Hornchurch
- Denomination: Church of England
- Website: The parish of Hornchurch

Administration
- Province: Canterbury
- Diocese: Chelmsford
- Archdeaconry: Barking
- Deanery: Havering

Clergy
- Vicar: Ken Wylie

The church of St Andrew's, Hornchurch, is a Church of England religious building in Hornchurch in England. It is a Grade I listed building.

== History ==
During the Anglian ice age around 450,000 years ago, the ice sheet reached The Dell, a few metres south of the current location of the church. It has been claimed that this is the furthest south reached by any ice sheet in Britain during the Pleistocene epoch, however the Anglian icesheet is known to have extended as far south as the north coast of Cornwall and to Scilly.

There has been a church on this site since at least 1163, when it was given by Henry II to the Hornchurch Priory.

The tower and the north porch were added in the 15th century. The tower contains 10 bells hung in a clockwise ring. The tenor is 18cwt (2016 lb or 914 kg) in Eb (622.0 Hz) dating from 1779. The bells were augmented from six bells to eight in 1901, then from eight to ten in 2001. On Monday May 27, 1912 a band of ringers led by William Pye rang a peal of 15,264 changes of Bristol Surprise major in 9 hours and 49 minutes. This was at the time the longest length rung in any surprise method.

== Design ==
The current church is an example of late Gothic architecture. It was designated as a Grade I listed building by Historic England in 1955.

== Interments ==
St Andrew's contains a number of funereal monuments and memorials to local families and dignitaries. Among these are memorials to the daughters of William Blackborne, who lived at Hornchurch and who was related to Abraham Blackborne, the long-serving rector (58 years) of Dagenham, as well as Levett Blackborne, Lincoln's Inn barrister and grandson of Sir Richard Levett, Lord Mayor of London. In addition to the Blackborne memorial, there is also a stone tablet incised with verses proclaiming it as the resting place of the "Right Hon. Thomas Clutterbuck, treasurer of the Navy, and one of his Majesty's (King George II) most honourable privy council," who died 1742. The churchyard contains the war graves of 37 Commonwealth service personnel of World War I and four of World War II.
