= Henry Flitcroft =

English architect (1697–1769)

- Born: 30 August 1697 probably Hampton Court, England
- Died: 25 February 1769 (aged 71); Hampstead, England
- Occupation: Architect
- Buildings: Wentworth Woodhouse; Woburn Abbey; St. Giles-in-the-fields

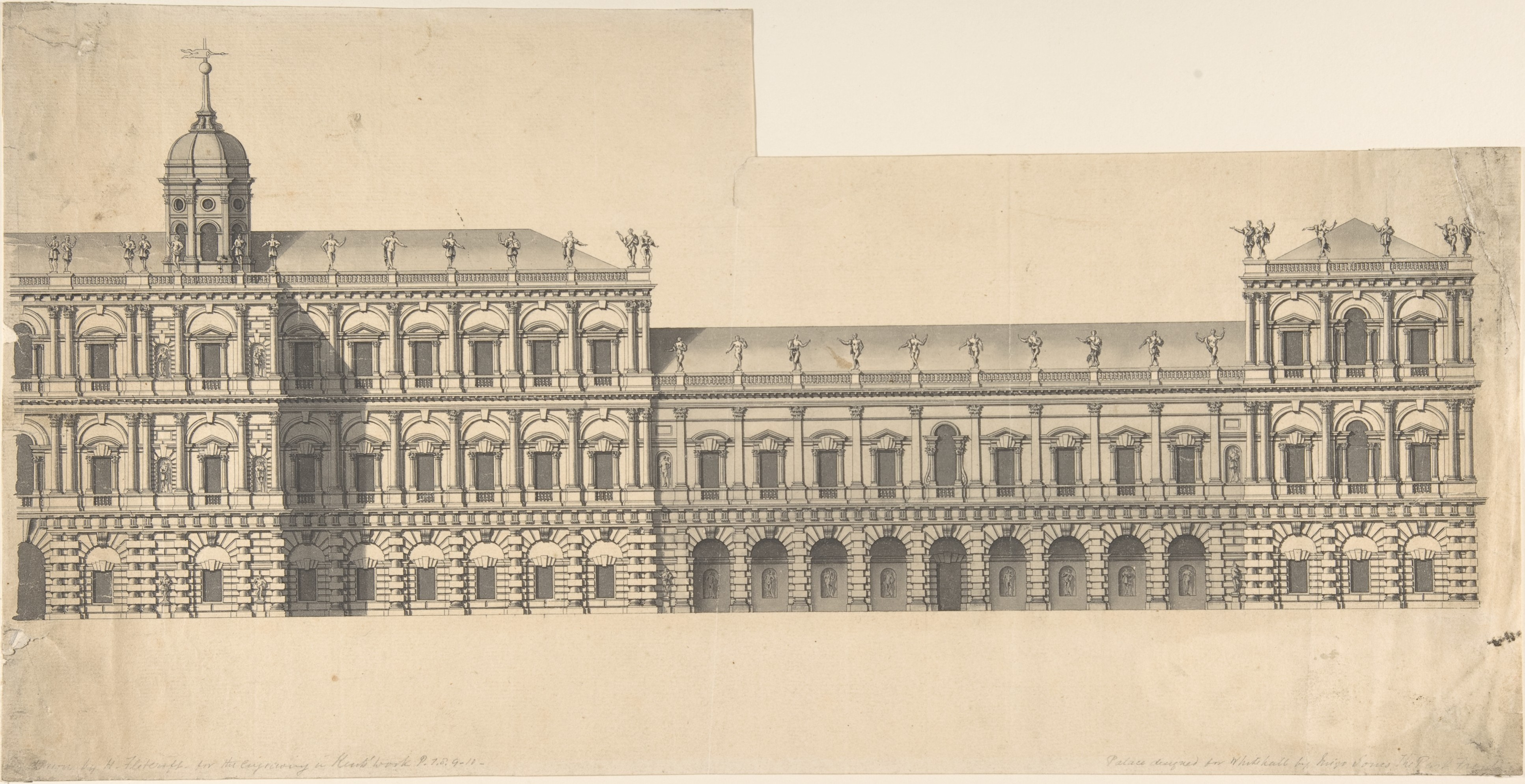
Flitcroft's drawing for Whitehall Palace

Henry Flitcroft (30 August 1697 – 25 February 1769) was a major English architect in the second generation of Palladianism. He came from a humble background; his father was a labourer in the gardens at Hampton Court. Flitcroft began his career as a joiner. While working as a carpenter at Burlington House, he fell from a scaffold and broke his leg. During his recovery, the young Lord Burlington noticed his talent with a pencil. By 1720, Flitcroft was Burlington's draughtsman and general architectural assistant, surveying at Westminster School for Burlington's dormitory and superintending on site at Tottenham House. Working within Burlington's inner circle, which championed the new Palladian architecture, provided Flitcroft with valuable education.

Flitcroft redrew the plates for publication in The Designs of Mr. Inigo Jones, published by William Kent in 1727 under Burlington's patronage and supervision. In May 1726, Burlington secured his protégé an appointment at the Office of Works, where he advanced from Master Carpenter and Master Mason to Comptroller of the King's Works, a prestigious position. He also received royal commissions for private projects for junior members of the British royal family, notably Prince William, Duke of Cumberland to whom he had been his "architectural tutor". His work for the Duke at Windsor Great Park included collaborating with Thomas Sandby who worked as Flitcroft's assistant when designing Virginia Water Lake's 'Great Bridge'.

Flitcroft adapted and altered The Great Lodge at Windsor (later known as Cumberland Lodge) for its chief resident, the Duke of Cumberland. In 2022, a conference room at Cumberland Lodge is named 'Flitcroft' after him.

Flitcroft's designs such as a "low rustic bridge with rockwork at Virginia Water" are held in the Royal Collection Trust and reveal that Sandby often created drawings of Flitcroft's designs. Flitcroft was constantly occupied with private commissions. Like most professional architects (and unlike virtuoso earls), he also engaged in speculative construction in newly developing London streets, supplied stone, and contracted to erect the buildings he designed.

Flitcroft designed Potternewton Hall, near Leeds c.1730. His panelling and a mantelpiece from one of the hall's rooms were installed in Sutton Park after 1935.

== Royal Patronage ==
From 1746 to 1756, he served as Surveyor of the Fabric of St Paul's Cathedral and was Comptroller of the King's Works from 1758 to 1769.

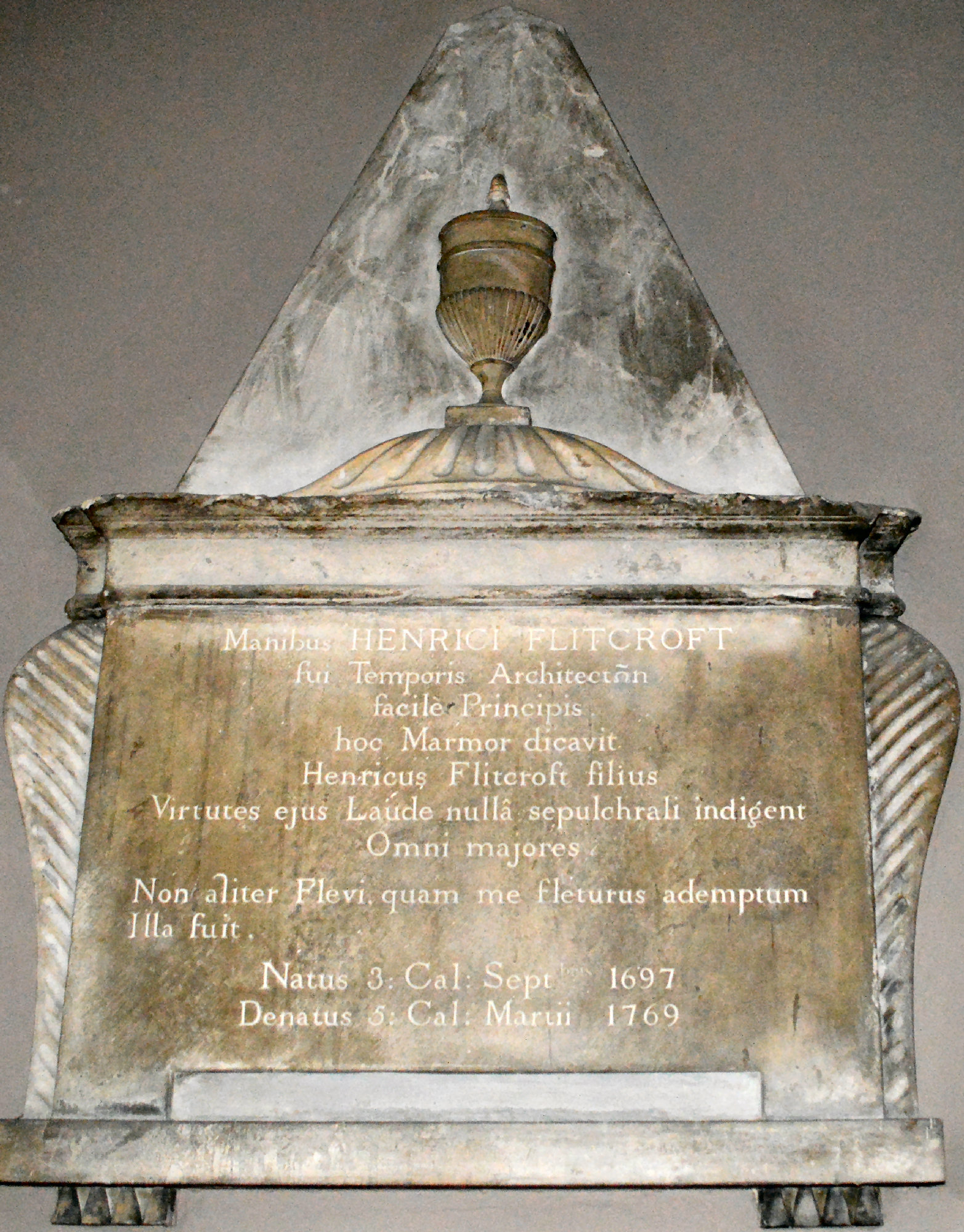
Monument at St Mary's church, Teddington

In 1724, Flitcroft married Sarah Minns at St Benet's, Paul's Wharf. His son Henry was born in Hampton (1742). Flitcroft is buried at St Mary with St Alban, Teddington, alongside his son Henry (died 1826) and wife Jane (died 1778). The inscription on his tomb records that "Here lies the body of HENRY FLITCROFT of Whitehall in the county of Middlesex who had the honour of serving three first Princes of the House of Brunswick in the Board of Works of which he was successively Appointed Clerk, Master Mason & Controller in the last of which Office he continued till his death which happened on the 25th of February 1769." A memorial to Henry Flitcroft is located on the west wall inside the church.

Flitcroft Street, near St Giles in the Fields, London, was named after Henry Flitcroft.

== Major commissions ==
- Lilford Hall, Northamptonshire: 1740s. He designed the interiors at Lilford.
- Bower House, Essex: 1729.
- St Giles in the Fields, London: 1731–1734.
- Ditchley Park, Oxfordshire: 1724 onwards. At Ditchley, he designed interiors, collaborating harmoniously with William Kent.
- Wentworth Woodhouse, W. Riding, Yorkshire: 1735 onwards. He rebuilt and enlarged the east front and added wings.
- St Giles House, Wimborne St Giles, Dorset: 1740–1744. Interiors.
- Stowe House, Buckinghamshire: c. 1742. The State gallery (attributed).
- Wimpole Hall, Cambridgeshire: 1742–1745.
- Stourhead, Wiltshire: 1744–1765. Garden temples.
- Woburn Abbey, Bedfordshire: 1748–1761.
- Milton Hall, Northamptonshire: 1750–1751.

Flitcroft built extensively in the West End of London.

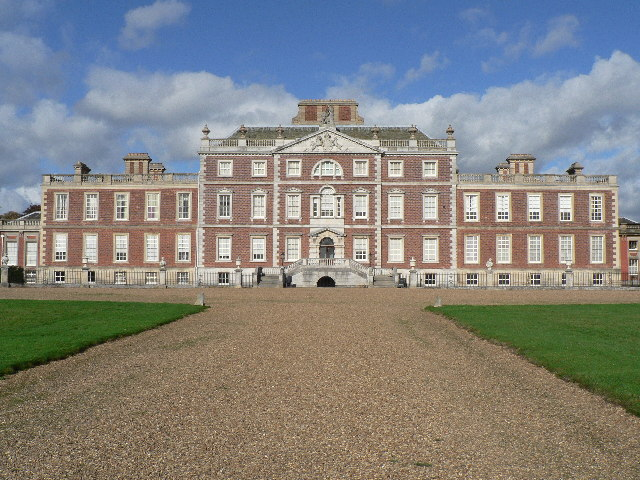
Wimpole Hall, as remodelled by Flitcroft

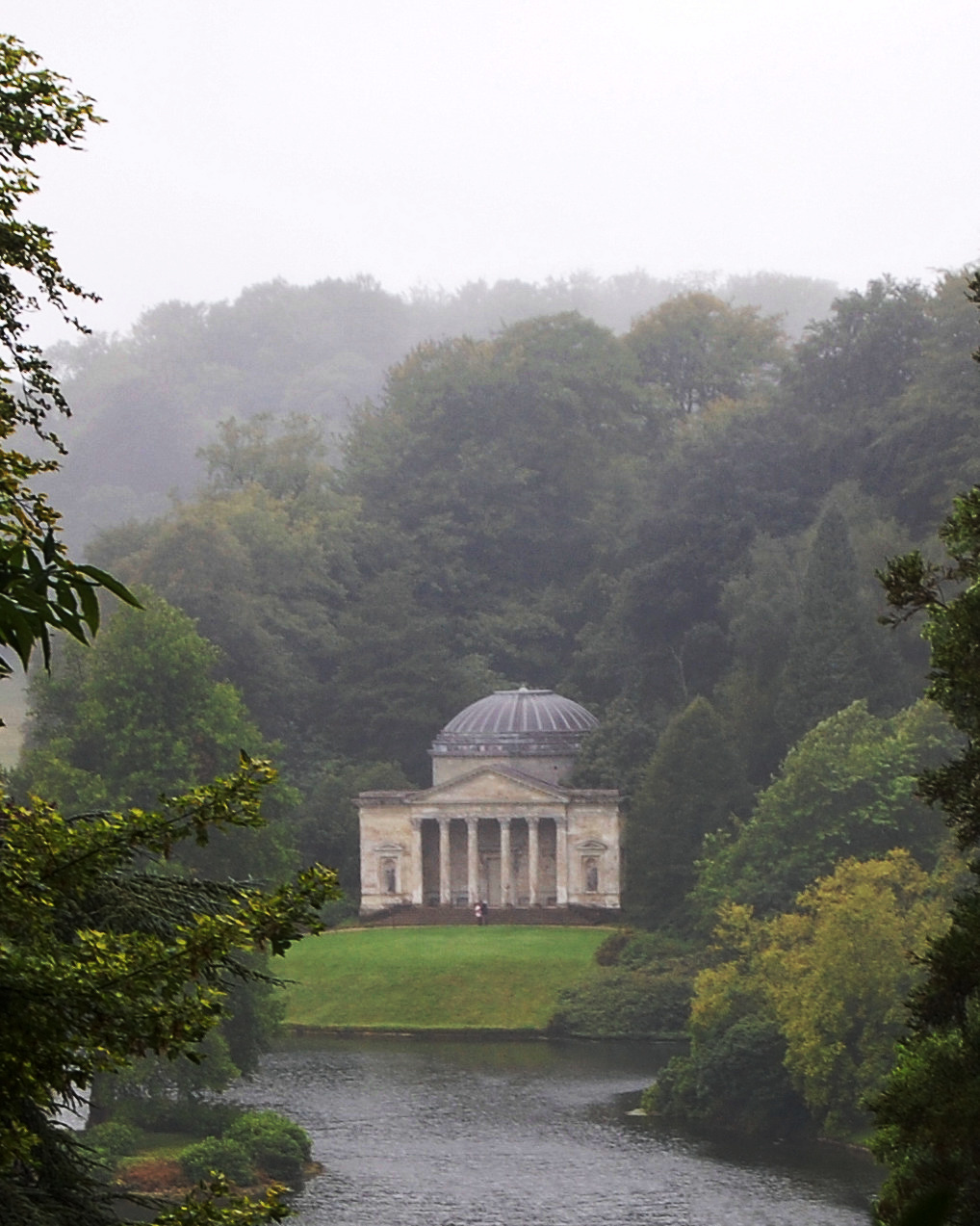
The Pantheon, Stourhead

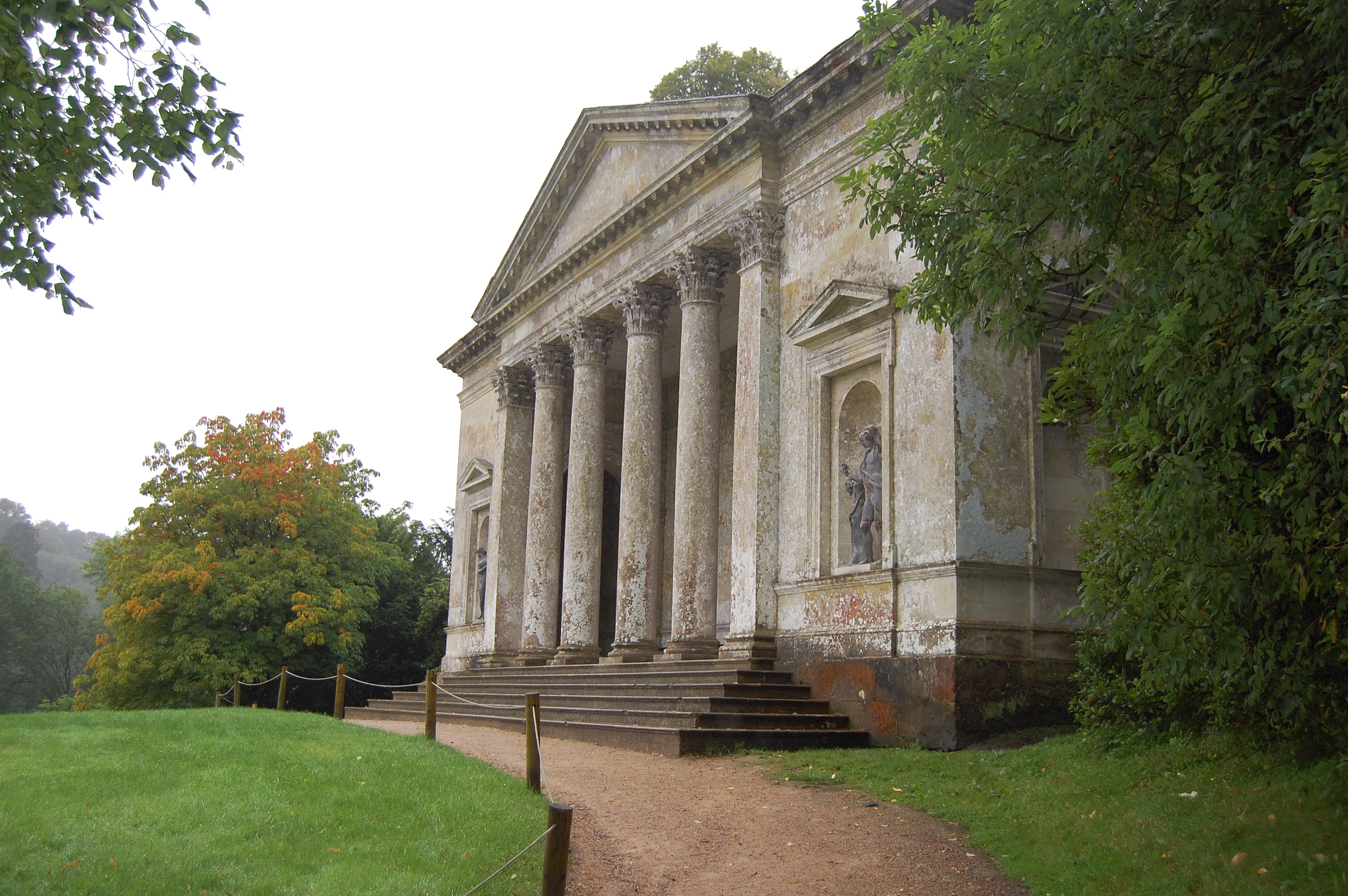
Facade The Pantheon, Stourhead

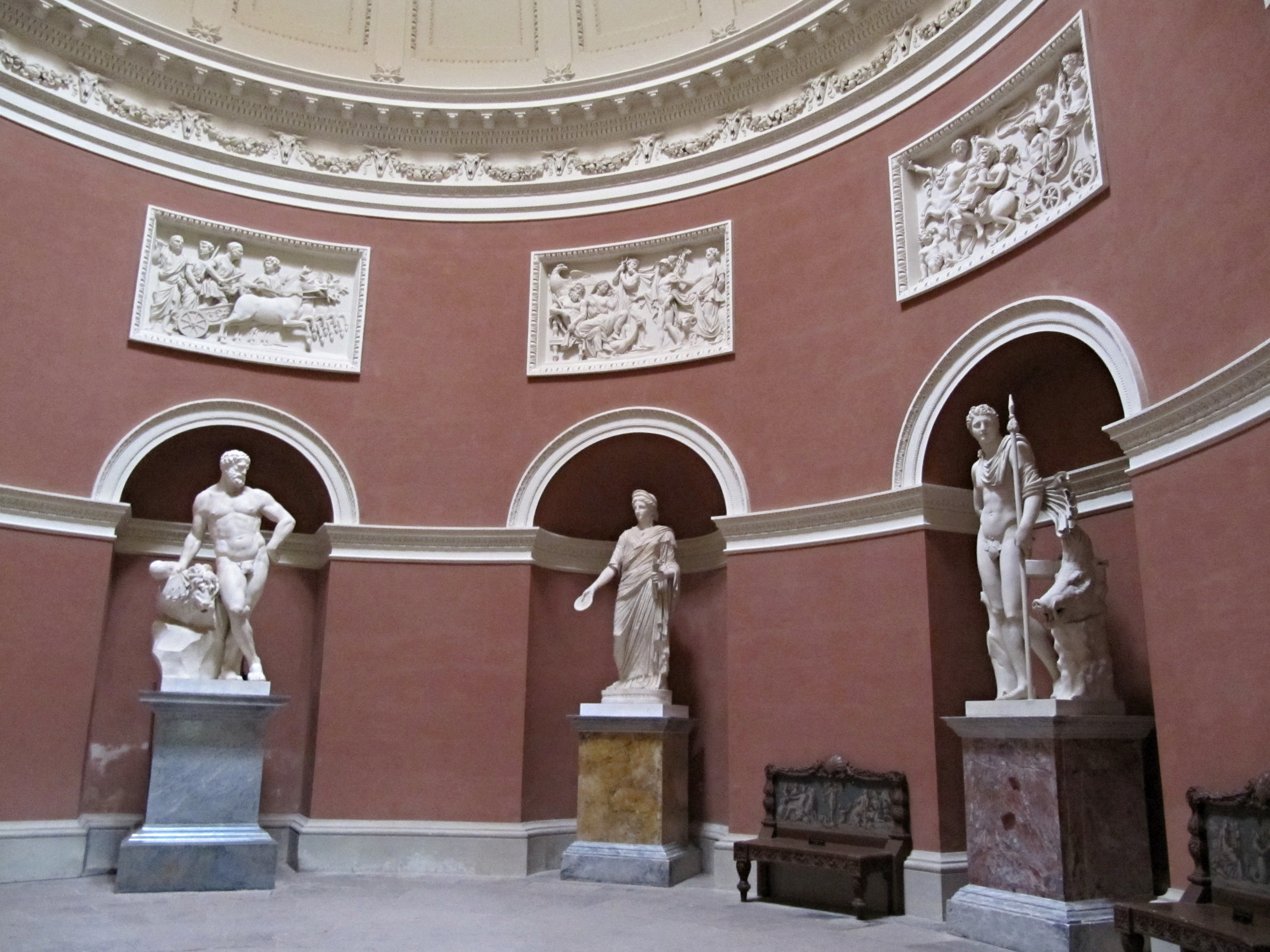
Interior, The Pantheon, Stourhead

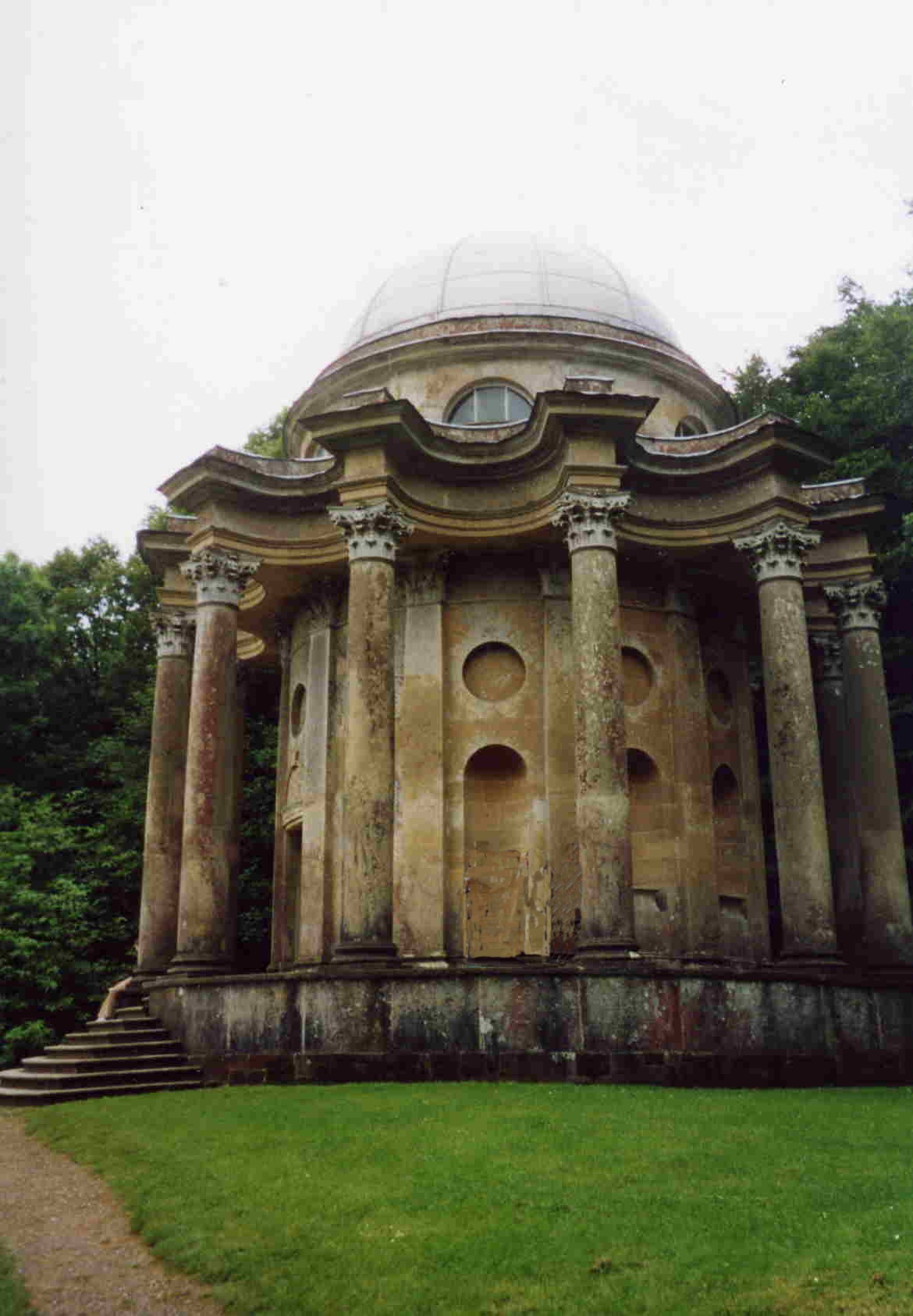
The temple of Apollo, Stourhead

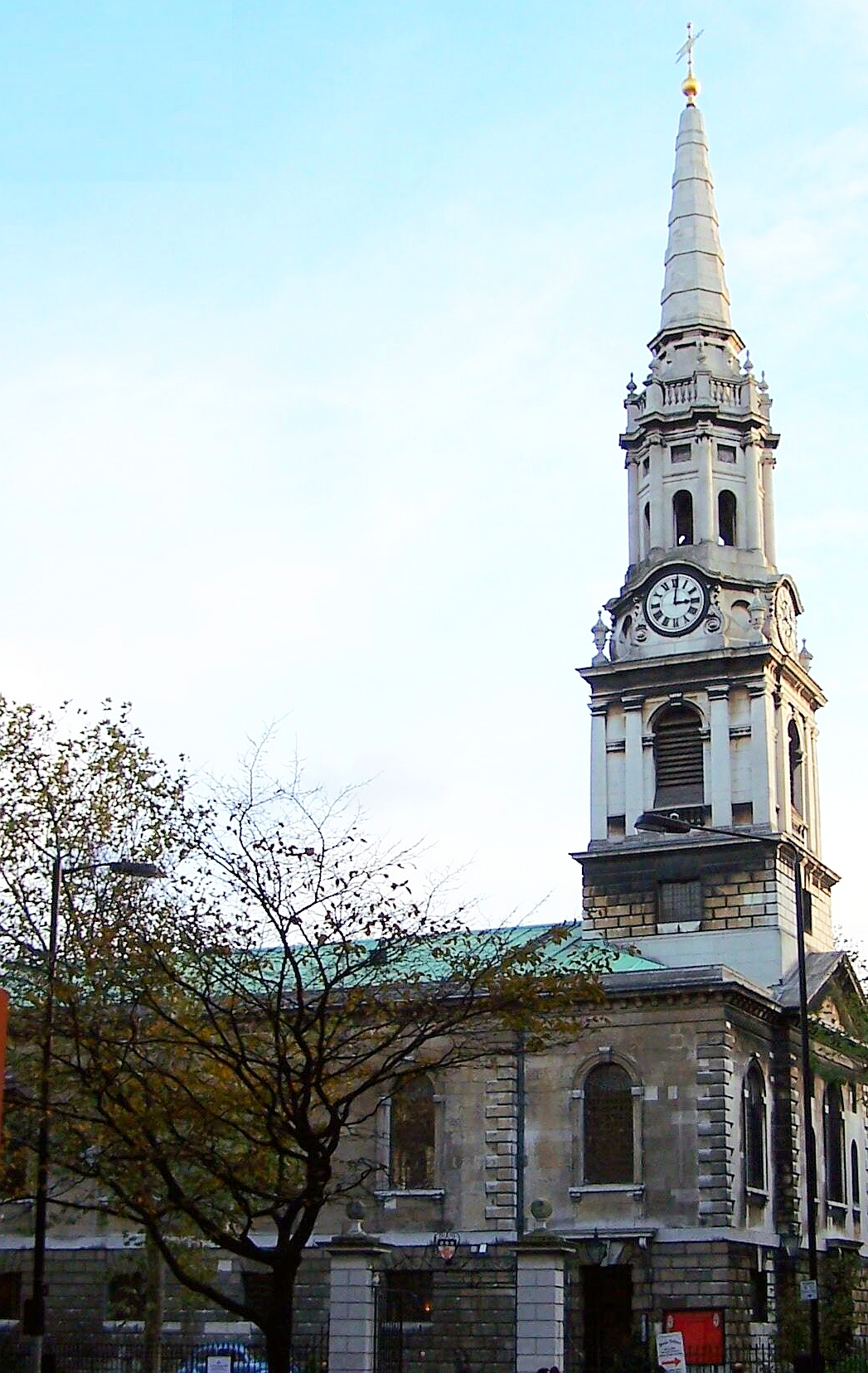
North front, St. Giles-in-the-fields

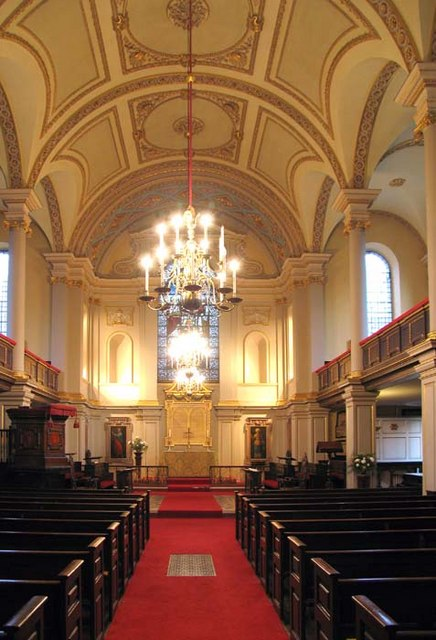
Looking East, St. Giles-in-the-fields

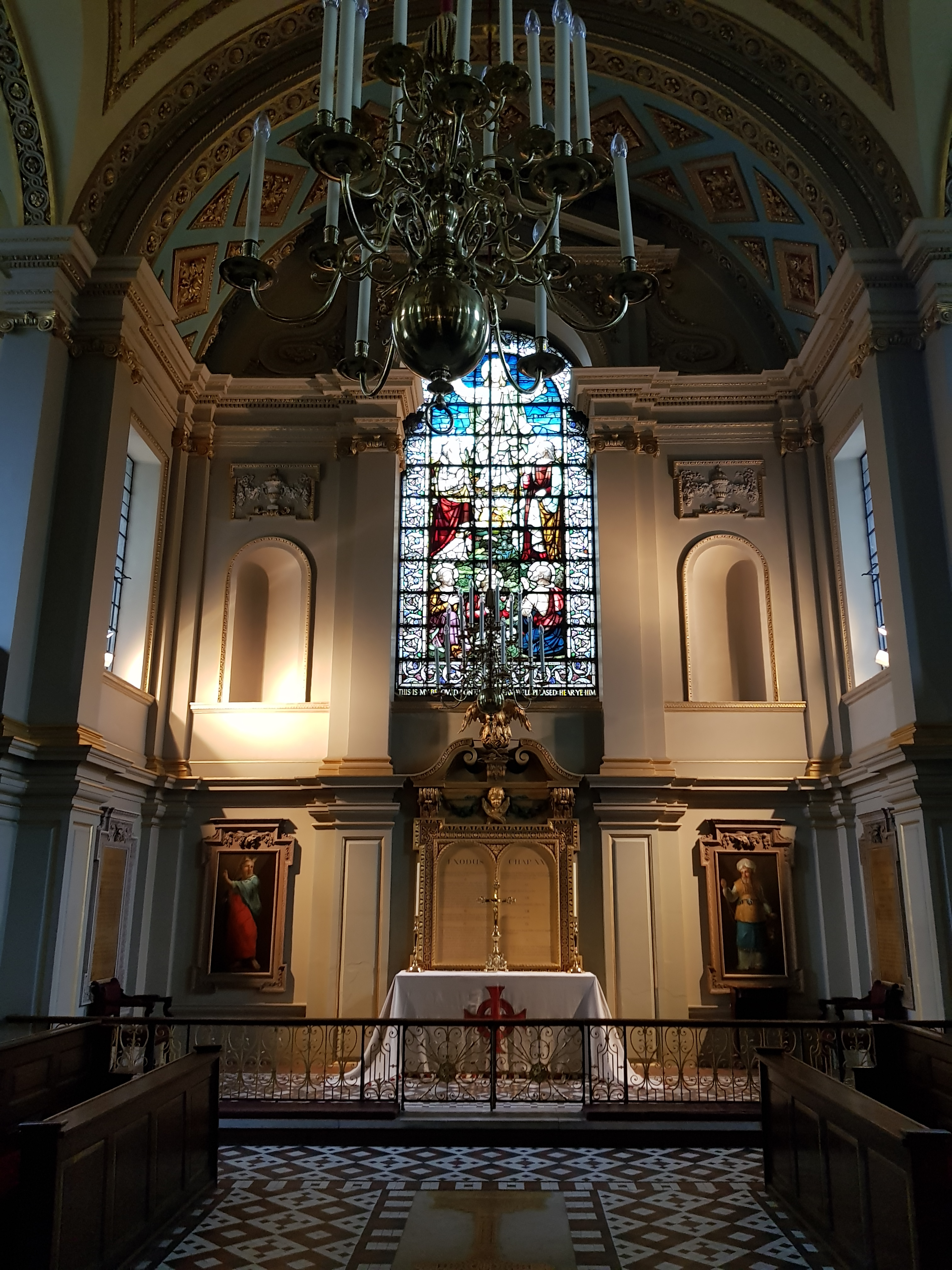
Altar, St. Giles-in-the-fields

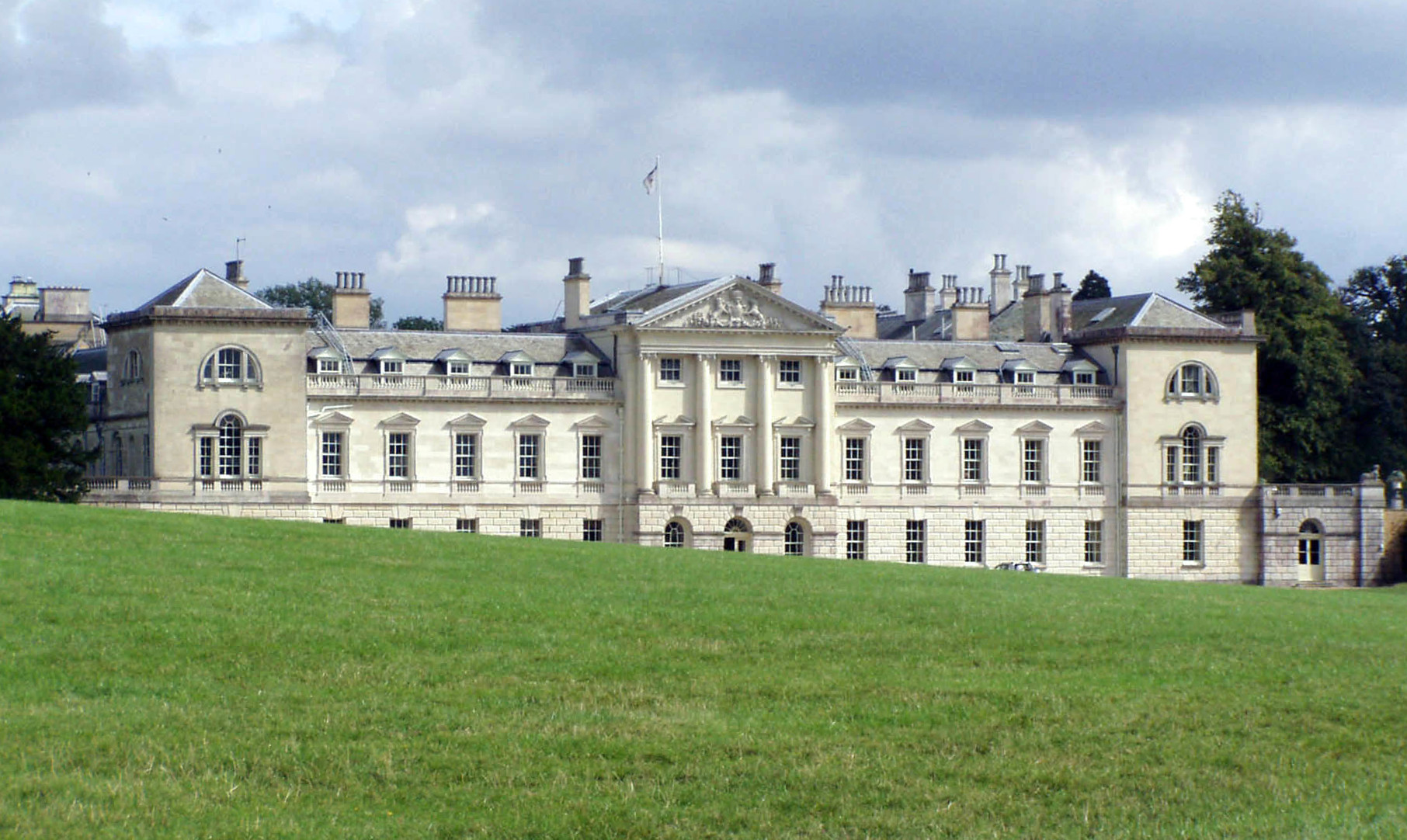
West front, Woburn Abbey

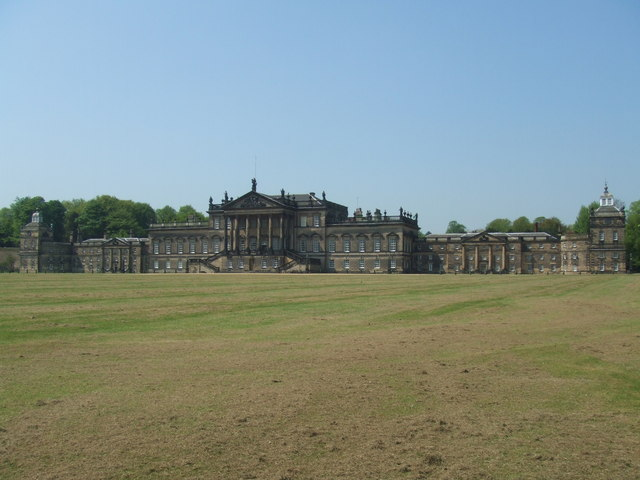
East front, Wentworth Woodhouse, the wings were altered later by John Carr

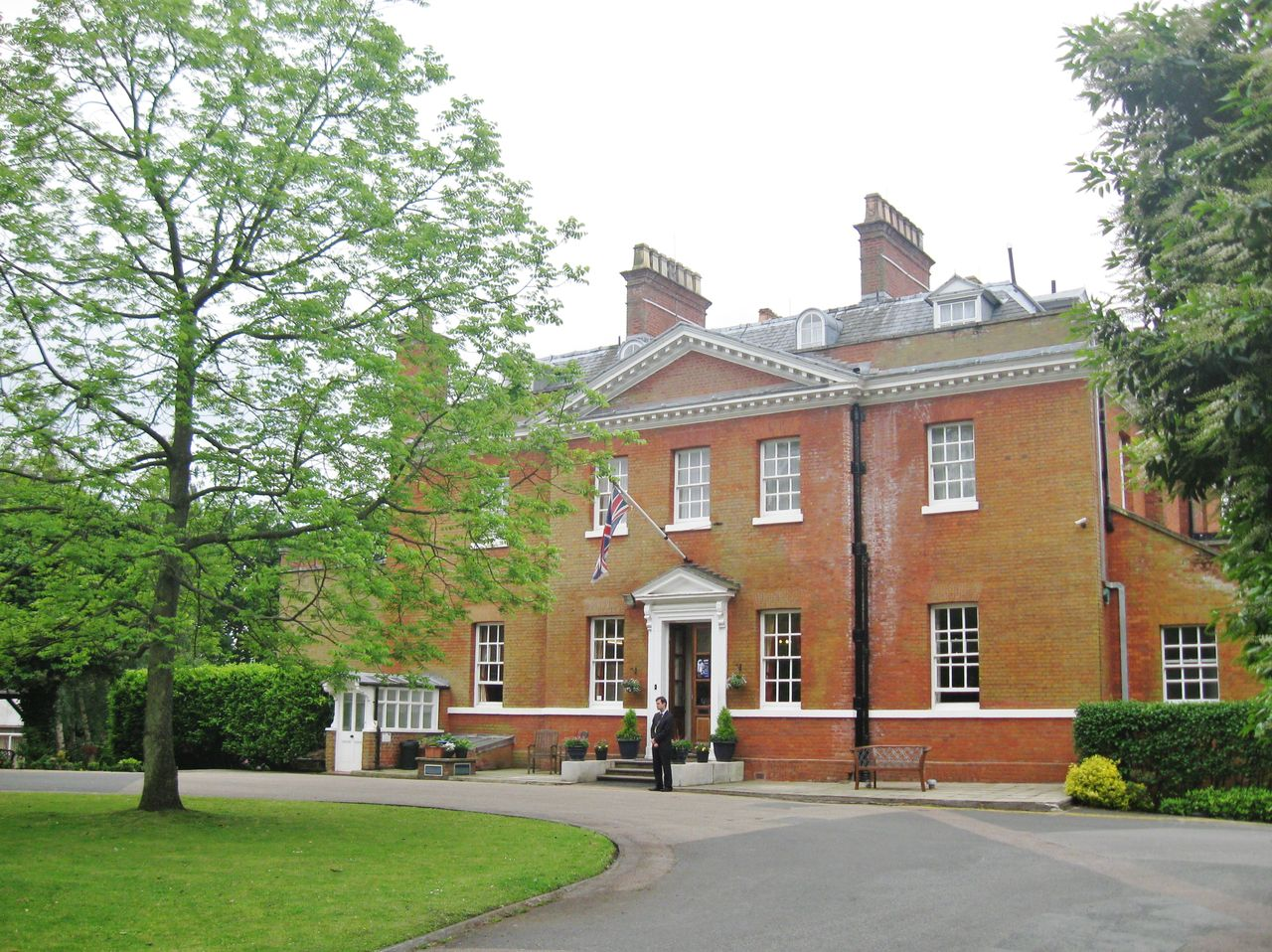
Bower House, Essex

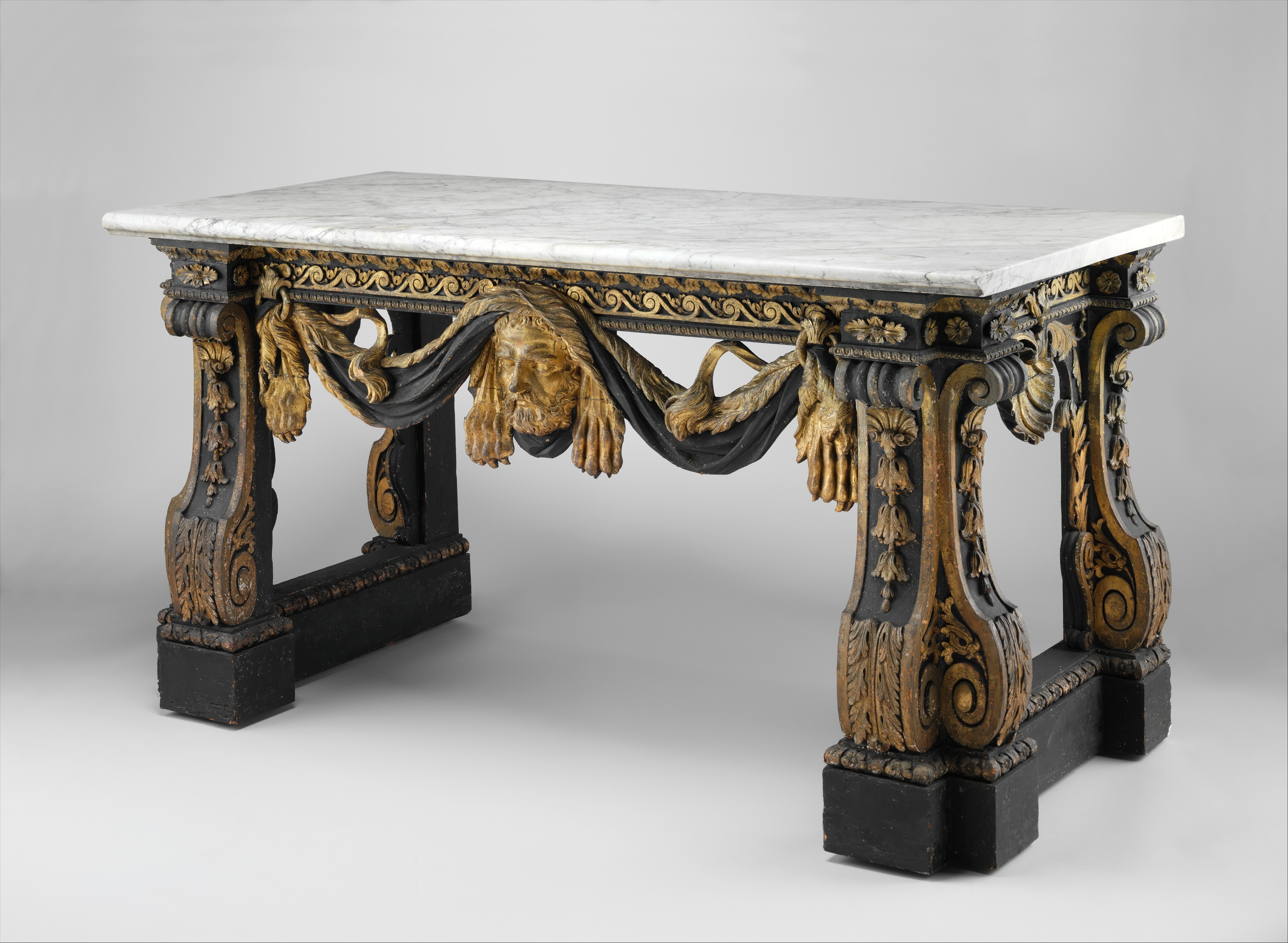
table designed c.1740-1745

== Sources ==
- H. M. Colvin, The History of the King's Works, London: H.M.S.O. (1963–1982)
  - ISBN 0-11-670571-X
  - ISBN 0-11-670568-X (v.3,pt 1)
  - ISBN 0-11-670832-8 (v.4,pt 2)
  - ISBN 0-11-670571-X (v.5)
  - ISBN 0-11-670286-9 (v.6)
  - ISBN 0-11-671116-7 (Plans 5–7)
- Colvin, Howard Montagu (1978). A biographical dictionary of British architects, 1600 - 1840 (New ed.). London: Murray. ISBN 9780719533280.
- Heward, John; Taylor, Robert (1996). The country houses of Northamptonshire. Swindon: Royal Commission on the Historical Monuments of England. ISBN 1-873592-21-3.
- Hedley, Gill; Smith, Charles Saumarez (2023). The ingenious Mr Flitcroft: Palladian architect 1697-1769. London: Lund Humphries. ISBN 9781848226500.

Court offices
Preceded by Thomas Ripley	Comptroller of the King's Works; 1758–1769	Succeeded by William Chambers
