= Church of St John the Evangelist, Havering-atte-Bower =

Church in Greater London, England

Coordinates: 51.6161°N 0.1822°E

St John the Evangelist, Havering-atte-Bower
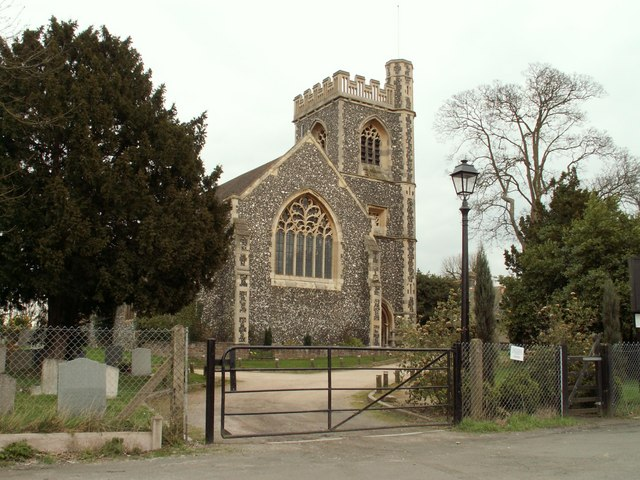
- St John the Evangelist, Havering-atte-Bower
- Denomination: Church of England

History
- Dedication: John the Evangelist

Administration
- Province: Canterbury
- Diocese: Chelmsford
- Archdeaconry: Barking
- Deanery: Havering

St John the Evangelist, Havering-atte-Bower is a Church of England religious building in the village of Havering-atte-Bower, an outlying settlement of the London Borough of Havering.

== History ==
The church is on the site of the chapel dedicated to St Mary that was part of Havering Palace. The chapel was demolished in 1876.
