= Havering Country Park =

Country park in London, England

Coordinates: 51.6137°N 0.1733°E

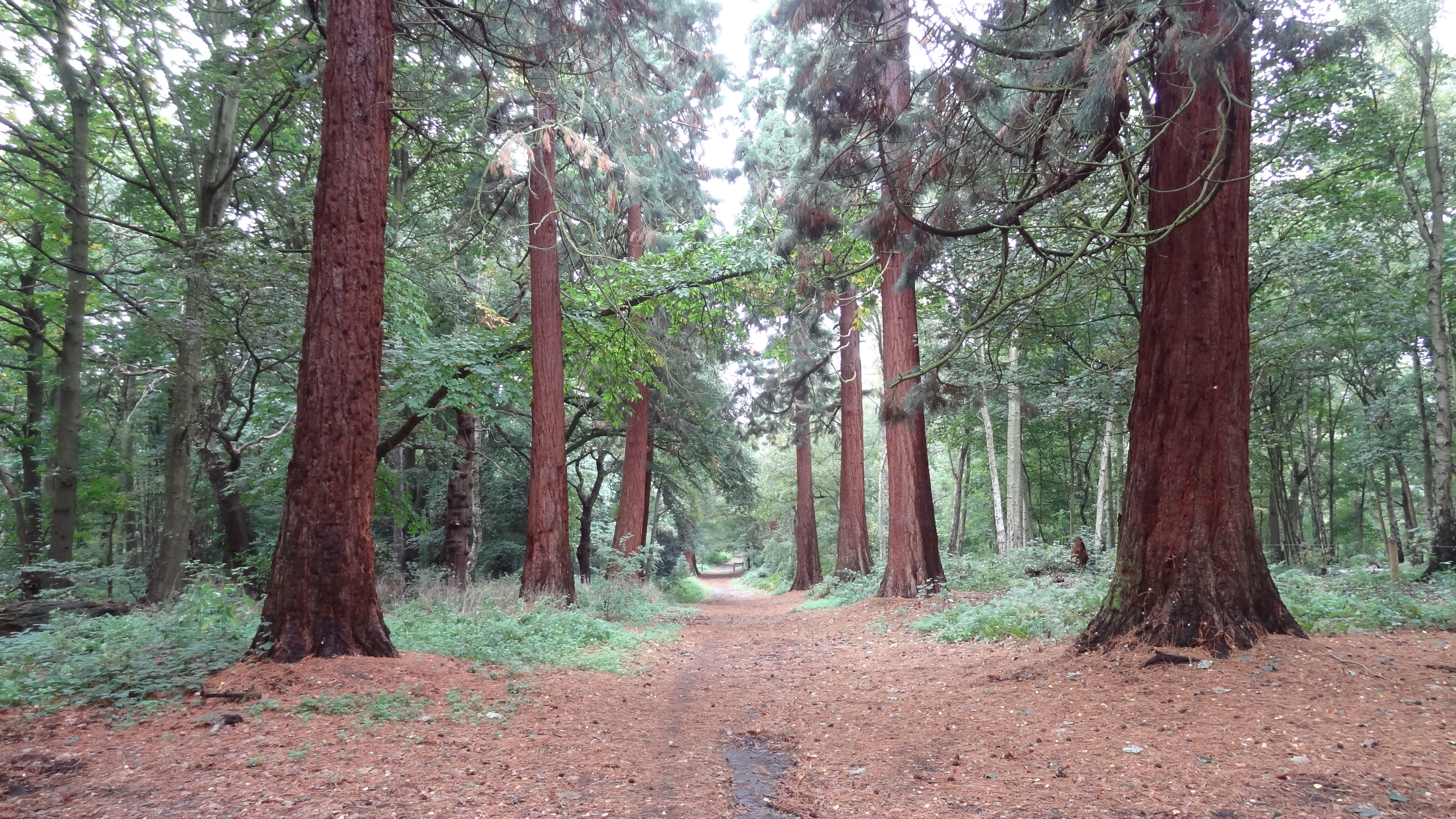
Wellingtonia Avenue

Havering Country Park is a varied environment open space in the London Borough of Havering. It includes 100 acres (0.40 km^{2}) of woodland.

It is one of three large parklands in Havering-atte-Bower, the others are Bedfords Park and Pyrgo Park.

The area of the park was formerly part of the estate of Havering Palace.

The land was purchased by the Greater London Council and opened to the public in 1975, with ownership transferring to Havering Council in 1986.
