= Rosa 'Buff Beauty' =

Rose cultivar

'Buff Beauty'
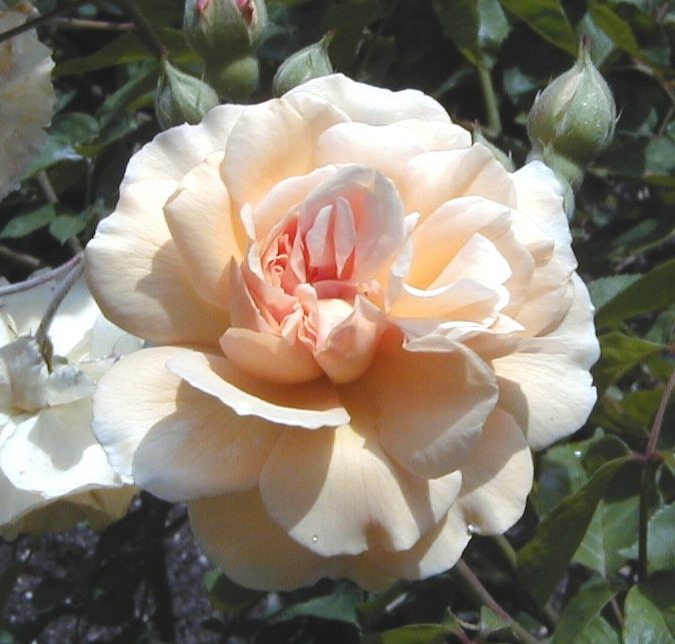
- Rosa 'Buff Beauty'
- Genus: Rosa
- Hybrid parentage: 'William Allen Richardson' x 'Unnamed seedling'
- Cultivar group: Hybrid musk
- Cultivar: 'Buff Beauty'
- Origin: Ann Bentall (Great Britain, 1939)

Rosa 'Buff Beauty' is an apricot Hybrid musk rose cultivar, bred by Ann Bentall and introduced into Great Britain in 1939. Bentall and her husband, John Bentall, inherited the rose fields of acclaimed rose breeder, the Reverend Joseph Pemberton after his death in 1926. The rose was awarded the Royal Horticultural Society's Award of Garden Merit in 1993.

== History ==
The Reverend Joseph Pemberton (1852–1926), Anglican clergyman and rose hybridizer is recognized for creating the Hybrid musk class of roses. He established the Pemberton Nursery at Romford, Essex after his retirement from the clergy in 1914. His primary focus in rose breeding was the development of modern roses similar to the old fashioned, musk scented roses that his grandmother grew in her garden. His rose breeding program was a great success, and at the time of his death, the Pemberton nursery had raised sales of 35,000 to 40,000 annually. In his will, Pemberton bequeathed the Pemberton rose fields to his two long time nursery gardeners, John Bentall and Mr. Spruzen.

Ann Bentall was a passionate and experienced gardener and rose breeder. She and John Bentall bred and sold roses commercially in the late 1920s and 1930s. The hybridization of 'Buff Beauty' has often been attributed to John Bentall or Joseph Pemberton, with Ann credited only with the introduction of the rose in 1939, after her husband's death. Ann Bental is currently recognized as the creator of 'Buff Beauty'. According to author Peter Schneider, "Even though she (Ann) bred two of the five most widely grown roses in the world today ('The Fairy' and the pink-and-white hybrid musk 'Ballerina'), Ann Bentall has never been admitted into the pantheon of 'Great Hybridizers'.

== Description ==
'Buff Beauty' is a vigorous spreading medium shrub, 4 to 10 ft (120–305 cm) in height, with a spread of 4 to 8 ft. (120–245 cm). The plant bears large, nodding clusters of medium, semi-double flowers with a strong tea rose fragrance. Blooms have an average diameter of 3 in (10–15 cm) and can have 40 to 50 petals. Flower color varies from buff yellow, apricot and apricot-blend to orange. 'Buff Beauty' blooms in flushes from summer to fall. The shrub grows in long arching, smooth stems bearing glossy, dark green foliage. Flowers repeat throughout the season. The plant is heat tolerant and grows well in the shade. It makes an excellent climber and is hardy in zones 4 to 9.

== Awards ==
'Buff Beauty' has received the Royal Horticultural Society's Award of Garden Merit (1993), as well as the American Rose Society's Classic Shrub Rose Award at the East Bay Rose Society Show and the Temecula Valley Rose Society Show.
