= Havering-atte-Bower =

Village in Greater London, England

Coordinates: 51.6203°N 0.1877°E

- Village
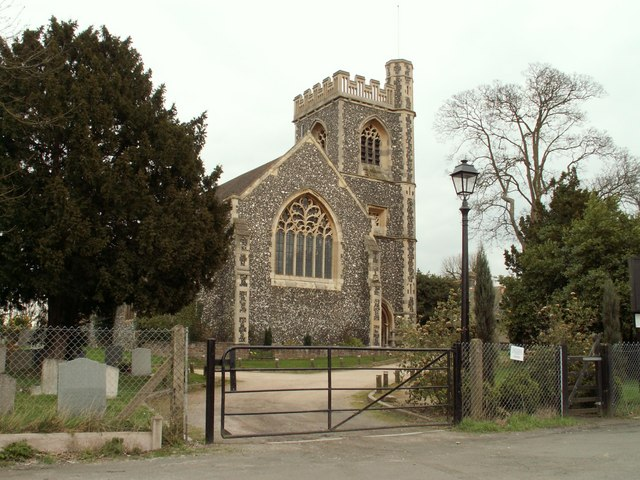
- St. John the Evangelist, the parish church of Havering-atte-Bower

- Location within Greater London
- OS grid reference: TQ515935
  - Charing Cross: 15 mi (24 km) SW
- London borough: Havering
- Ceremonial county: Greater London
- Region: London
- Country: England
- Sovereign state: United Kingdom
- Post town: ROMFORD
- Postcode district: RM4
- Dialling code: 01708
- Police: Metropolitan
- Fire: London
- Ambulance: London
- UK Parliament: Romford
- London Assembly: Havering and Redbridge

Havering-atte-Bower (/ˈheɪvərɪŋ ˈæti ˈbaʊər/ HAY-vər-ing AT-ee BOW-ər) is a village in Greater London, England, in the far north of the London Borough of Havering. The village lies 15 miles (24 km) northeast of Charing Cross. It was one of three former parishes whose area comprised the historic Royal Liberty of Havering.

Havering-atte-Bower has been the location of a number of palaces and large houses including Bower House, The Round House, Pyrgo Palace and Havering Palace.

== Etymology ==
The name is of Saxon origin and is recorded in the Domesday Book of 1086 as Haueringas. The last syllable is the only clear difference in pronunciation as v was written as u in Middle English and Anglo-Norman orthography. It is an ancient folk name meaning settlement of the followers of a man called Hæfer. The history of Havering-atte-Bower today is inextricably linked with Edward the Confessor and comparison can be made with Old Windsor in Berkshire, which had a Saxon palace that predated Windsor Castle as both villages are situated on high ground and have great views into London.

It has been suggested that Edward the Confessor would have travelled to and from his palaces at both Havering-atte-Bower and Old Windsor. A story relating to the return of a ring to Edward the Confessor and attributing the name Havering to the words "have ring" was widely recounted in the 17th century, but is now considered to be no earlier than the 15th century, the story of the return of the ring predating this explanation of the place name by several hundred years.

The name is recorded as Hauering atte Bower in 1272 and from this time Havering and Havering-atte-Bower are used interchangeably. The atte Bower suffix is taken to mean at the royal residence and to refer to Havering Palace which was situated here, although some link the use of Bower to other locations in Essex such as Bowers Gifford where Bower means a rural dwelling. Circumstantially it has been suggested that a different meaning of the word Bower relating to a dwelling specifically set aside for a woman could relate to the use of the Palace by Eleanor of Provence, mother of Henry III, when she was Queen Dowager although there is no documentary evidence for this interpretation.

Whichever meaning is correct, it appears that the great house here was known as "The Bower" in the late 13th century.

== History ==
The history of Havering dates back at least to Saxon times, with the format of the name indicative of an early Saxon settlement while archaeological finds in and around Havering Country Park suggest a Roman villa or similar structure in the area. The village is also steeped in royal history and Edward the Confessor was the first monarch known to take interest in the area when he established a hunting lodge which, over the years would become a palace or 'bower'. It is believed, though disputed, that he may have died in the house that he had loved so much before being buried at Westminster Abbey. It appears that Havering retained this royal connection as the Domesday Book lists it has been in the possession of King Harold in 1066 and King William in 1086. At that time there were 45 households and the land consisted of 100 acres of meadow with additional woodland and a mill.

The surrounding areas, including the parishes of Hornchurch and Romford, formed the Royal Liberty of Havering from 1465 to 1892. Until the 17th century, royalty used the house of Havering Palace for various reasons, adding the architectural style of the day to the expanding palace.

Another palace, east of the village, called Pyrgo, was purchased by Henry VIII to relieve the now ageing Havering Palace. By the 17th century, the Royal Palace of Havering was in decline, and it was eventually pulled down. Pyrgo was also demolished later, in the 18th century. Only one set of plans exists from the original Havering Palace, courtesy of a survey by Lord Burghley in 1578.

The village green still has on display its original village stocks, while on the opposite side of the road is a pond known as "Ducking Pond", rumoured to have been used for trials of witches. Though the name of the pond suggests such a history, hard evidence is yet to be uncovered. However, there are currently plans to construct a replica ducking stool at the site.

On 1 April 1965 the civil parish was abolished. At the 1951 census (one of the last before the abolition of the parish), Havering atte Bower had a population of 5812.

== Geography ==
The village sits on one of the highest points in London, in the far north of the borough and near the M25 motorway. It is situated 344 feet (105 m) above sea level with striking views of east London, Essex and Kent. To the north is open countryside and to the south are the large suburban developments of Harold Hill and Collier Row.

The village is surrounded by three large parks: the dense woodlands of Havering Country Park (site of one of only two redwood plantations in England, imported from California); Bedfords Park; and Pyrgo Park. The most notable residence in the village now is Bower House, built in 1729 by John Baynes, using some of the materials of the former Havering Palace. The area is on the route of the London Loop long-distance footpath.

A village sign, funded by the East London Community Foundation and Havering-atte-Bower Conservation Society, was unveiled by Boris Johnson, the Mayor of London, on 3 September 2010.

== Churches and schools ==
Dame Tipping School in the village was founded by Dame Anne Tipping who was daughter of Thomas Chief, a governor of the Tower of London. The school opened in 1891 and is still operating today with the same main building that was used when the school was founded, although the school has had various changes and extensions through the years .

St John the Evangelist is a Church of England church which is located facing the green. It was built in 1878 to replace an older chapel dedicated to St Mary that had its origins as part of Havering Palace. The palace also had a private chapel dedicated to St Edward.

== Transport ==
Transport is limited in this area, with only one bus route, route 375.

Route Number	Route	Via	Operator	Operation
375	Passingford Bridge to Romford station	Stapleford Abbotts, Chase Cross, Collier Row	Arriva London	Mon-Sat every 90 minutes, London Buses service Times

Also see List of bus routes in London.

The nearest railway station is at Romford. There are frequent services from Romford station to London and East Anglia. Route 375 can be used to go there.

== Notable people ==
- Joseph Pemberton, rosarian.
- Will Ospreay, professional wrestler.

== Sources ==
- Smith, Harold (1925). A history of the parish of Havering-Atte-Bower Essex. Colchester: Benham and Company.
- Past, Present and Future of Havering DVD
