= Passingford Bridge =

River crossing in Essex, England

Coordinates: 51.6552°N 0.1722°E

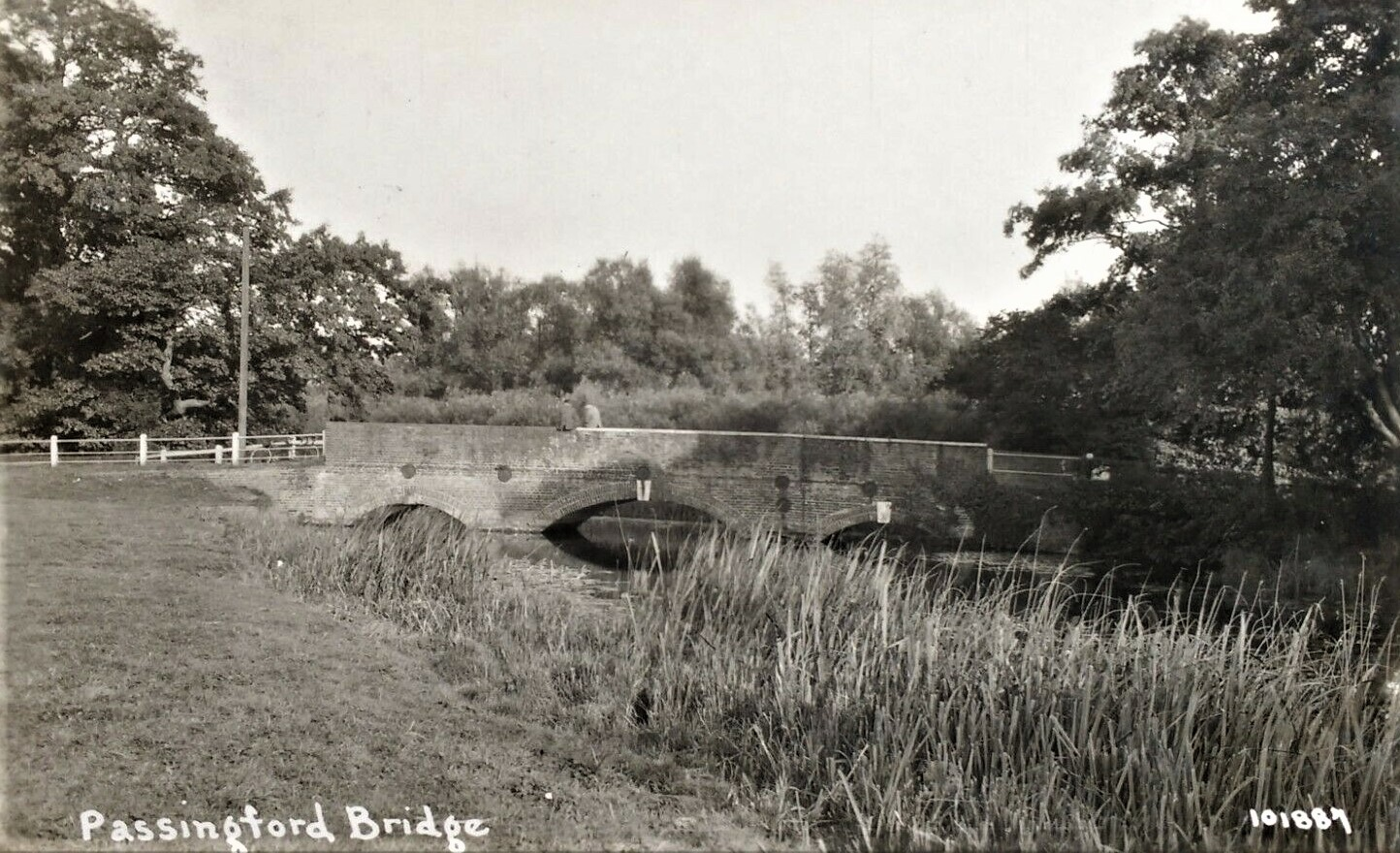
Passingford Bridge, Essex

Passingford Bridge is a bridge over the River Roding, and a surrounding hamlet, in the parish of Stapleford Tawney in the Epping Forest district of Essex, England. It is located just within the northeastern bounds of the M25 motorway and is surrounded by Metropolitan Green Belt. It is within the RM postcode area. It is served as an outlier of the London Buses network, forming the northern terminus of route 375 from Romford.
