= Havering Palace =

Former royal residence in England

Coordinates: 51.61490°N 0.17685°E

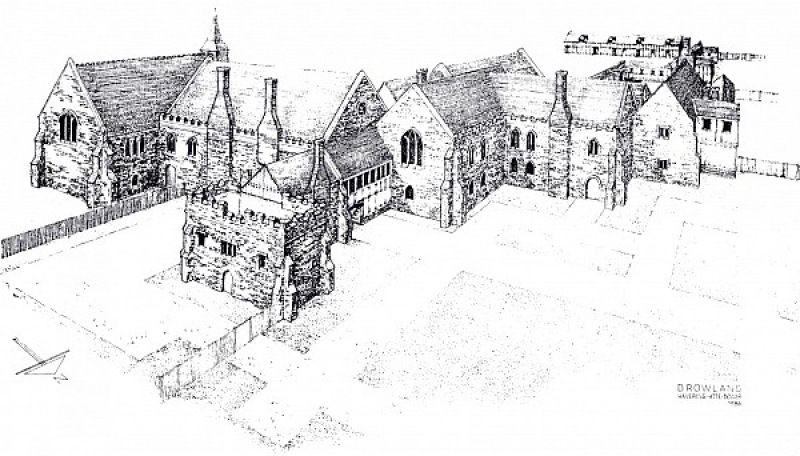
A modern reconstruction of Havering Palace as it would probably have appeared in 1578, viewed from the north-east.

Havering Palace was an old royal residence in England, in the village of Havering-atte-Bower (formerly in Essex, since 1965 in the London Borough of Havering). It was built before 1066 but abandoned in 1686. By 1816 no walls remained above ground.

== History ==
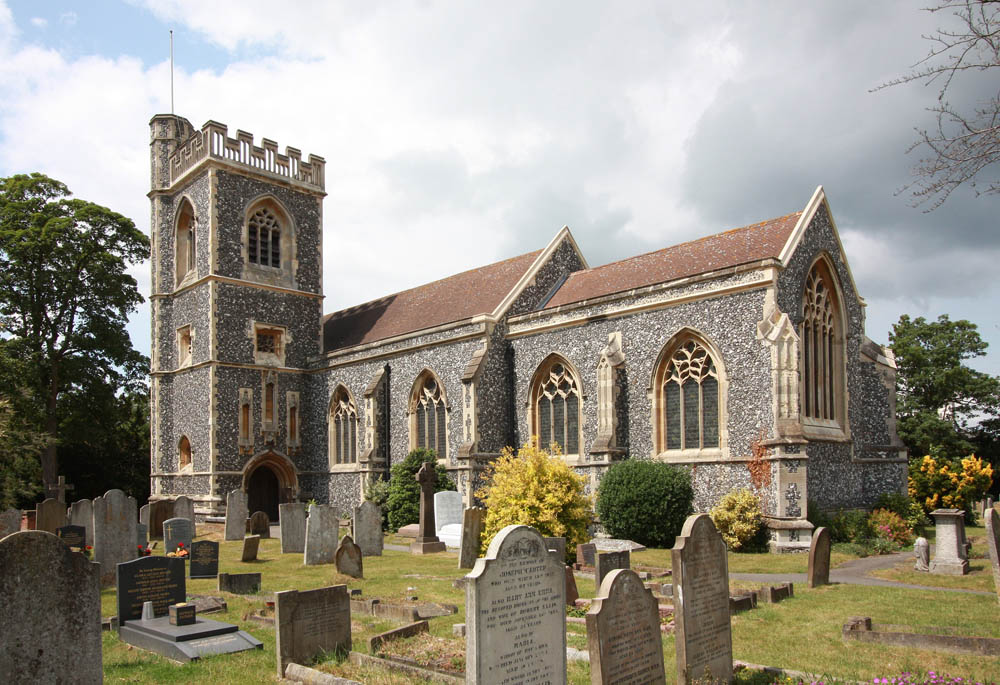
The associated church of St John the Evangelist in 2011

The earliest references to a royal demesne at Havering date from the time of Edward the Confessor, and although there is no definite proof that he ever visited it, the strength of local legend suggests he did, and as the manor was recorded in the Domesday Book as being held by Earl Harold in 1066 it seems likely that it had been held by Edward. It was definitely a royal manor by the Norman Conquest when it passed to William the Conqueror. The royal manor also gave the surrounding area the designation of the Royal Liberty of Havering, which gave those living in the area freedom from taxation and other benefits. The manor was granted to Queen Eleanor by Henry III in 1262 (or possibly 1267) and thereafter usually belonged to the queen consort or dowager (the queen mother) until the death of Jane Seymour in 1537, this association leading to the 'Bower' portion of the village's place name.

A house was already at Havering by the 12th century, and extensive building took place in the 13th century. Many monarchs from then on are recorded as having stayed there and in 1358 Edward III held a five-month Marshalsea Court at Havering Palace for locals to air their personal grievances, an unusual act since the Marshalsea Court was reserved for the royal household. Not all monarchs used Havering Palace for such holy occupations as did King Edward the Confessor, and in 1381 at the end of the Peasants' Revolt some who had rebelled met the young King Richard II to ask for mercy as he held court at Havering, but despite their pleas many were tried and executed. Richard also visited in 1397 on his way to Pleshey on a visit to Thomas of Woodstock which started a train of events that resulted in his murder on Richard's behalf.

Elizabeth of York kept horses at Havering and her accounts record that in December 1502 a man was paid a shilling to mark her colts and young horses were driven from Havering to Mortimer. Catherine of Aragon hosted Henry VIII and French visitors to the court at Havering in the summer of 1519. The palace needed upkeep with £50 being spent on repairs in 1521 and a further £230 on repairing the pale to the park in 1524. In the 1530s the house and park consisted of five officials, being Keeper of the Outwoods, Keeper of Havering Park, Paler of Havering Park, Keeper of the South Gate and Keeper of the Manor,

The palace was a rambling affair and took much upkeep so that, before Elizabeth I visited in 1568 seven carpenters, four bricklayers and two plumbers worked for up to 10 days in preparation and 'scowrers' cleaned the well. Queen Elizabeth I stayed at Havering Palace on several other occasions in the 1560s and 1570s and may also have stayed there while the army was mustered before going on to give her famous address at Tilbury although other sources dispute this. Despite the earlier repairs, even greater effort was required before a visit in 1594 involving lime, sand and gravel with work including sealing the vice-chamberlain's chamber, new rafters for the bakehouse, rehanging the gates on new gateposts and even a new bucket for the well. Certainly the impression given is of a building in much need of regular repair.

A survey of the buildings was made in May 1596 which noted fixtures and glazing in the main rooms, and only such furniture as cupboards and tables and internal porches, which were called "portal doors". The palace was watertight. There was a chamber for Lady Cobham and a lodging for the ladies of the Privy Chamber by the garden. This lodging was noted as rooms for "Ladies of Honour" on a ground plan drawn by John Symonds in 1578. After Elizabeth, James I stayed there regularly, usually for a single night. The house and manor were granted to his wife Anne of Denmark as part of her English jointure.

A Scottish courtier, George Home, 1st Earl of Dunbar, wrote of the health benefits enjoyed after a day's hunting at Havering in 1608, "our greatest matters here are hunting and sport for his Majesty's pleasure, the which being his health is the general good of us all". The Keeper of Havering, until her death in December 1612, was Elizabeth Trentham, Countess of Oxford. It has been suggested that James preferred to use Theobalds House on the other side of Epping Forest.

King Charles I was the last monarch to stay at Havering on 29–31 October 1638, possibly the only time that he visited the palace. He was on the way to meet his mother-in-law Marie de' Medici at nearby Gidea Hall. The close association with monarchy may have affected what happened during the Commonwealth as Richard Deane, who was one of those who signed the warrant for the Execution of Charles I, started dismantling the buildings and caused all of the mature trees in the park to be felled. After the Restoration the house, by then called Havering House and described as "a confused heap of old ruinous decayed buildings", was occupied by the Earl of Lindsey but despite evidence of considerable sums of money being spent on repairs to "His Majestys house at Havering", it became vacant some time between 1686 and 1719, when it was reported to be in ruins. A Latin inscription in the hall of the current Bower House, then named Mount Havering, implies that parts of that building were constructed using materials from the old Palace, and whether by removal or natural decay by 1740 the remains were not sufficient to allow the layout of the old buildings to be discerned, and by 1816 no walls were visible above ground. The final links with Havering Palace began to be severed when the prerogatives of the manor, including the right to appoint the High Steward of the Liberty, were auctioned in 1828 being purchased by Hugh McIntosh who lived at Marshalls in Romford. His son David McIntosh built a new mansion at Havering Park in place of the Bower Farm that stood near the site of the old house and probably incorporated some of the old outbuildings, and had the current church built in 1878 to replace the old one that had its origins as the palace chapel.

== Description ==
At its greatest extent before decay set in, most of the palace dated from the major building works of the 13th century with a newer block built in 1576–7. Described in the late 16th century, the plan was irregular with entry through a gatehouse allowing access to a set of connected buildings containing a great chamber, royal apartments, two chapels, and accommodation for the Lord Chamberlain and Lord High Treasurer. Supporting buildings included kitchens, a buttery, scullery, salthouse, spicery and a wet larder, beyond which were stables, various other out-buildings, and a garden. The parkland surrounding it covered most of the former parish of Havering-atte-Bower west of the main road (now North Road) and was much more extensive than the current Havering Country Park, which covers the part of the former park adjoining the site of the palace and is the 18th-highest hill in London.

== Residents ==
Royalty and other famous people who have resided in the palace at some point include:

- Edward the Confessor
- Harold Godwinson
- William I
- Henry II
- John
- Eleanor of Aquitaine
- Joan, Queen of Scotland, the sister of Henry III, who died here in 1238
- Edward III
- Richard II
- Isabella of Valois
- Joan of Navarre, who died at the palace in 1437
- Edward IV
- Henry VIII
- Mary I
- Elizabeth I
- Charles I, the last monarch to reside at Havering
- Marie de Medici, the Queen of France and mother-in-law to Charles I, although she took a look at the crumbling palace and decided to rest at Gidea Hall, Romford a few miles south.
- Richard Cromwell
- Robert Bertie, 3rd Earl of Lindsey
