= Church House =

Church House may refer to:

== Buildings ==
=== Diocesan and national ecclesiastical offices ===
- Church House (Presbyterian Church in Ireland), Belfast, Northern Ireland, headquarters of the Presbyterian Church in Ireland
- Church House, Brisbane, Queensland, Australia, office building used by Anglican organizations
- Church House, Westminster, headquarters of the Church of England
- Janani Luwum Church House, Kampala, Uganda, commercial building and headquarters of the Church of Uganda

=== Non-ecclesiastical residences ===
- Luke A. Church House, Modesto, California, US
- Cornelius Church House, Clarkesville, Georgia, US, listed on the National Register of Historic Places (NRHP)
- Seymour Church House, Winterset, Iowa, US
- William L. Church House, Newton, Massachusetts, US
- Zalmon Church House, Saline, Michigan, US, listed on the NRHP
- Philetus S. Church House, Sugar Island, Michigan, US
- Tousley-Church House, Albion, New York, US
- Olana State Historic Site, Columbia County, New York, US, also known as the Frederic E. Church House
- Benjamin Church House (Bristol, Rhode Island), US
- Church House (Columbia, Tennessee), US, Second Empire style of architecture designed by Peter J. Williamson
- Andrew Neill Church House, Seguin, Texas, US, a Recorded Texas Historic Landmark
- Benjamin Church House (Shorewood, Wisconsin), US

=== Parish-affiliated and formerly parish-affiliated buildings ===
- Church House, Barnet, England
- Church House, Crowcombe, England
- Church House, Warburton, England
- Church House, a Grade II listed building in Widecombe in the Moor, England
- The Church House, Tetbury, England
- Kennaway House, a Grade II* listed building in Sidmouth, England, previously known as the Church House

=== Other buildings ===
- Church house, a building used for Christian religious activities
- Church House and Star Inn Cottages, Lingfield, Surrey, England

== Organizations ==
- Church House Investments, a UK private bank
- Church House Publishing, official publisher for the Church of England
- Church House Trust, a UK private bank owned by Virgin Money
