= List of market towns in London =

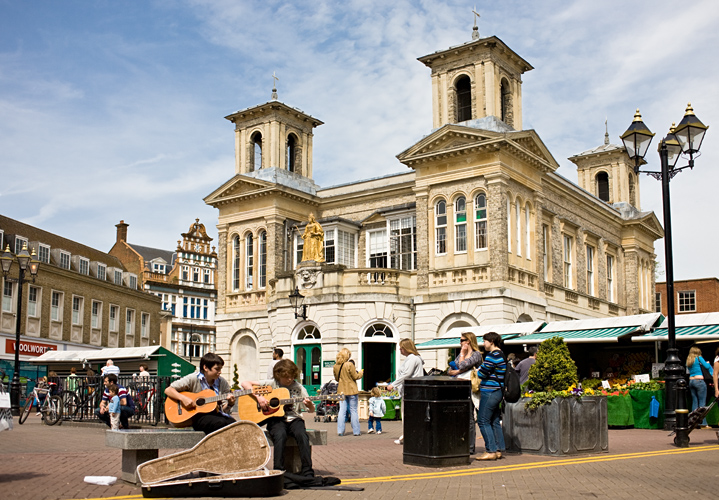
Market place in Kingston upon Thames

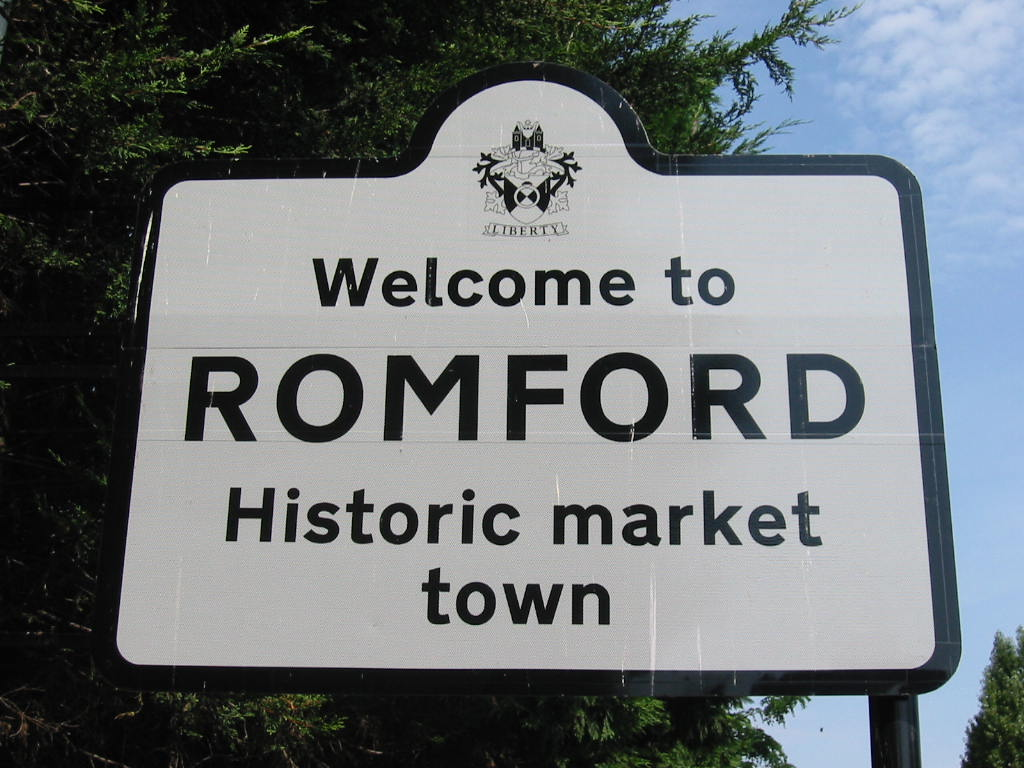
Historic market right is celebrated in Romford

This is a list of market towns that are now within the current area of Greater London. That is, a settlement where the municipal corporation has a market right, received from the monarch. Dates indicate the earliest known charters. The use of the market rights has lapsed in some towns and in some cases the use of the right was later revived.

Town	Location	London borough	Charter	Coordinates
Barking	Barking Market	Barking and Dagenham	1175	51.536°N 0.077°E
Brentford	Brentford Market	Hounslow	1306	51.483°N 0.309°W
Bromley	Bromley Market	Bromley	1205	51.536°N 0.077°E
Chipping Barnet	Barnet Market	Barnet	1199	51.656°N 0.203°W
Croydon	Surrey Street Market	Croydon	1276	51.372°N 0.101°W
Edgware	no longer exists	Barnet	no charter	no longer exists
Enfield	Enfield Market	Enfield	1303	51.652°N 0.082°W
Kingston upon Thames	Kingston Market	Kingston upon Thames	1208	51.536°N 0.077°E
Romford	Romford Market	Havering	1247	51.579°N 0.181°E
St Mary Cray	no longer exists	Bromley	1207	no longer exists
Uxbridge	Uxbridge Market (within The Mall Uxbridge)	Hillingdon	1180	51.546°N 0.481°W
Westminster	no longer exists	Westminster	1259	no longer exists
Woolwich	Woolwich Market	Greenwich	1620	51.490°N 0.069°E

== See also ==
- List of markets in London
- Market (place)
