= Barnet Museum =

Local museum in the United Kingdom

Coordinates: 51.652851°N 0.202316°W

- The Museum at Barnet.
- Established: 1938; 88 years ago
- Location: Barnet, London
- Public transit access: High Barnet
- Website: barnetmuseum.co.uk

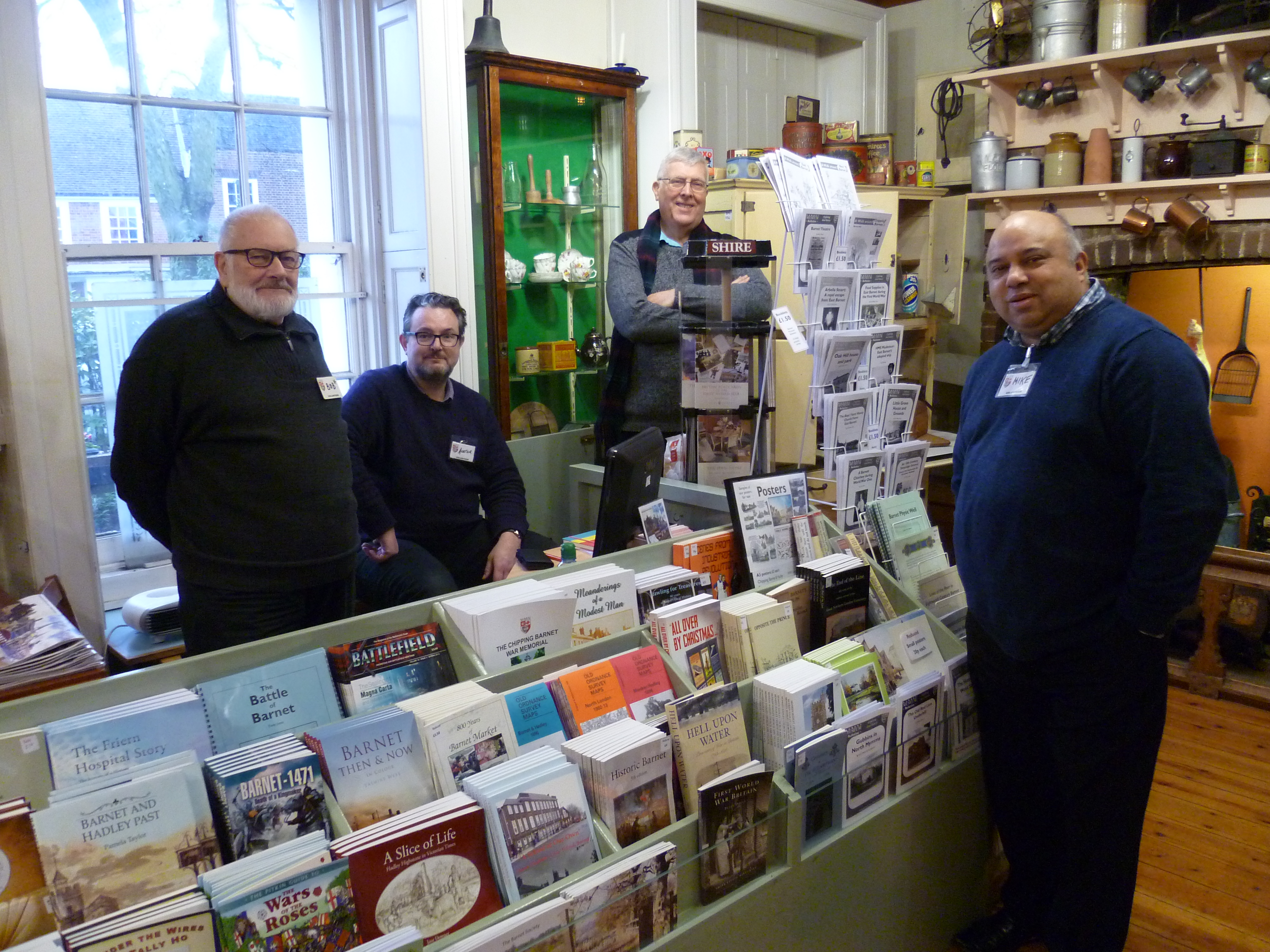
Volunteers at the museum.

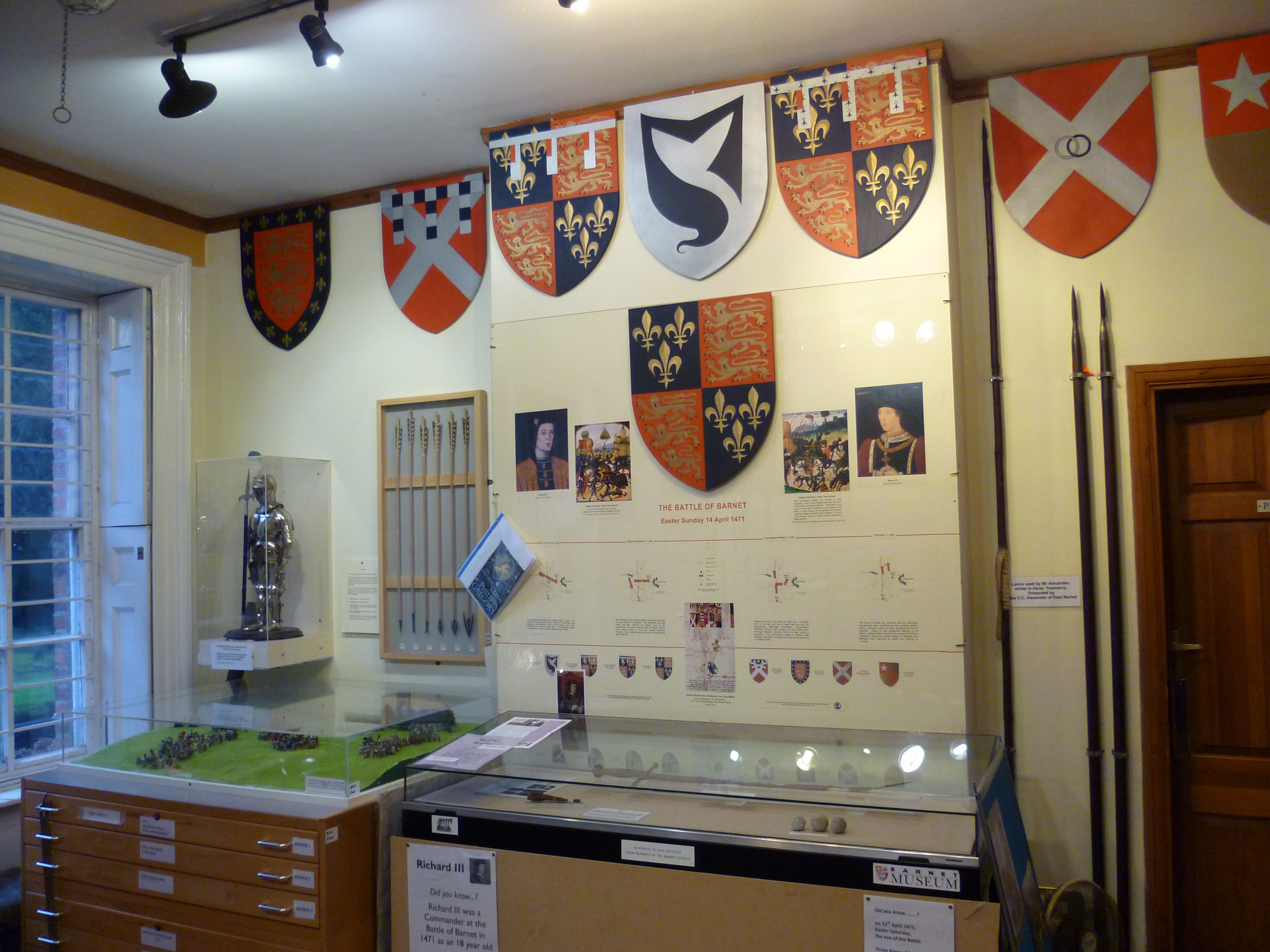
Ground floor displays.

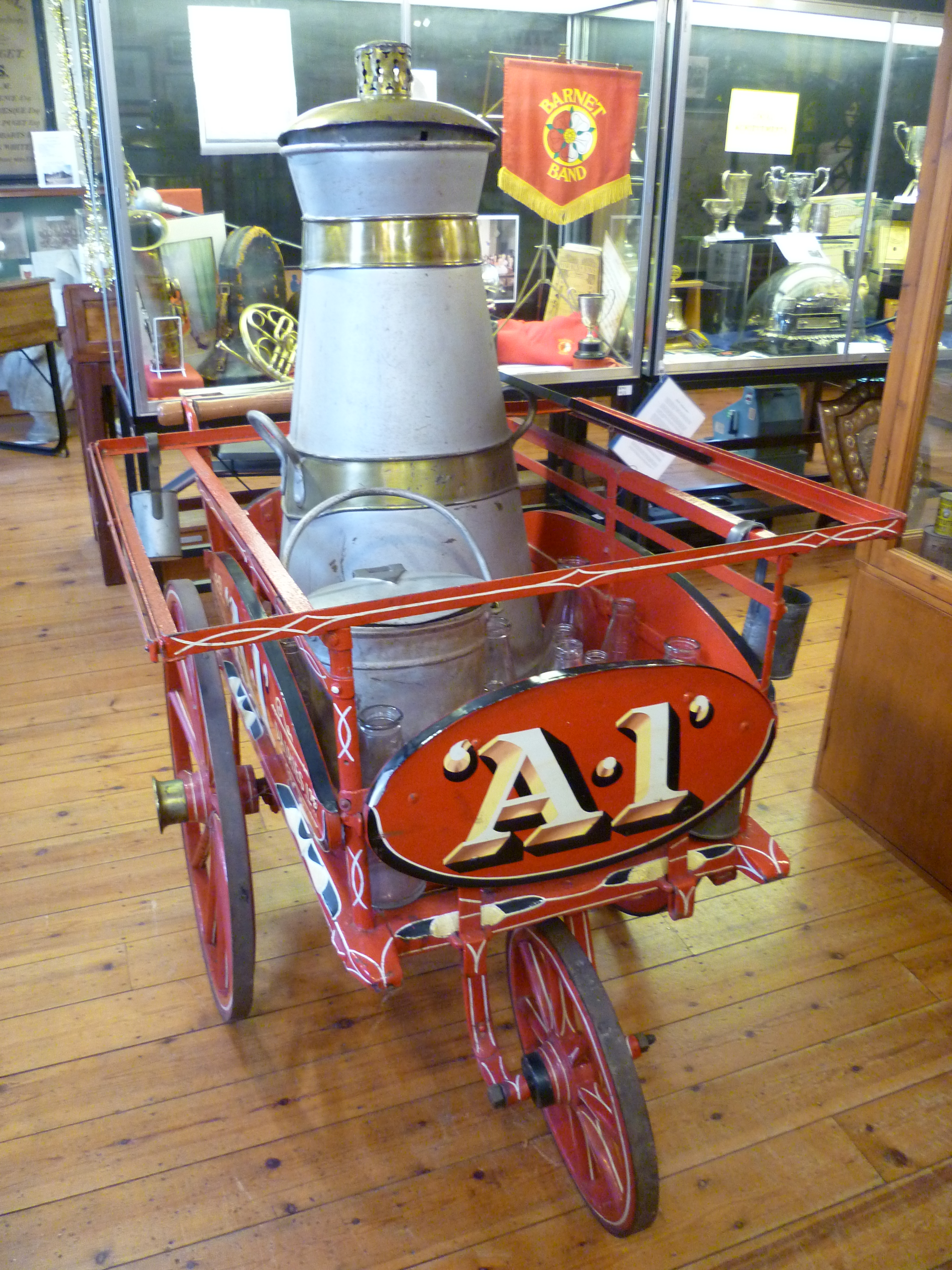
Milk delivery cart.

Barnet Museum is in the London Borough of Barnet. It has displays on topics including the Battle of Barnet, Barnet Fair and Barnet Market. It is a centre for local and family research and its archives, library and reference collection are available for use by members of the public.

== Description ==
The museum was founded in 1938, and it remains in its original home an early Georgian house in the heart of High Barnet. Its collection of objects, photographs, maps, books and documents - donated by local people and organisations - helps to preserve and celebrate Barnet's heritage.

It is a registered charity and is run entirely by volunteers from the Barnet and District Local History Society (originally the Barnet Record Society). The Museum hosts many guided visits for groups and local schools.

The Museum's public opening hours are: Tuesday, Wednesday and Thursday 2.30pm to 4.30pm; Saturday 10.30am to 4.00pm and Sunday 2.00pm to 4.00pm. Guided visits are arranged for when the Museum is closed to the public. Admission is free.

== Collections ==
The museum has permanent exhibitions on the following:

- The Battle of Barnet
- Archaeology – mainly medieval finds on display
- Domestic items – mainly from the 20th Century
- Costume – ladies dresses, bonnets and lace
- Public houses and the coaching trade in Barnet
- Local businesses – Watsons Microscopes, the Barnet Ventilator (credited with saving Elizabeth Taylor when she was young)
- Services, Hospital and Fire Service
- The Home Front in Barnet during World War II
- Schooling in Barnet
- Victorian Room

== See also ==
- Gillian Gear
