= Lenny Cooper (cricketer) =

English cricketer

Personal information
- Full name: Leonard Michael Gordon Cooper
- Born: 9 June 1981 (age 45); Barnet, London, England
- Nickname: LC
- Batting: Right-handed
- Bowling: Left-arm medium-fast

Domestic team information
- Years: Team
- 2000–2008: Hertfordshire

Career statistics
Competition	List A
Matches	2
Runs scored	6
Batting average	3.00
100s/50s	–/–
Top score	6
Balls bowled	96
Wickets	1
Bowling average	107.00
5 wickets in innings	–
10 wickets in match	–
Best bowling	1/63
Catches/stumpings	2/–
- Source: Cricinfo, 24 April 2011

Leonard 'Lenny' Michael Godfrey Cooper (born 9 June 1981) is an English cricketer. Cooper is a right-handed batsman who bowls left-arm medium-fast. He was born in Barnet, London.

Cooper made his debut for Hertfordshire in the 2000 Minor Counties Championship against Cambridgeshire. Cooper played Minor counties cricket for Hertfordshire from 2000 to 2008, including 22 Minor Counties Championship matches and 10 MCCA Knockout Trophy matches. In 2001, he made his List A debut against Worcestershire in the 3rd round of the 2001 Cheltenham & Gloucester Trophy. He played a further List A match in 2001, against Staffordshire in the 1st round of the following season's competition, which was played in 2001. In his two List A matches, he scored 6 runs at a batting average of 3.00, with a high score of 6. With the ball he took just a single wicket, which cost 107 runs. His only List A wicket was that of Staffordshire's Graeme Archer, with Cooper claiming figures of 1/63 from 10 overs.
