= Romford Market =

Large open market in Greater London

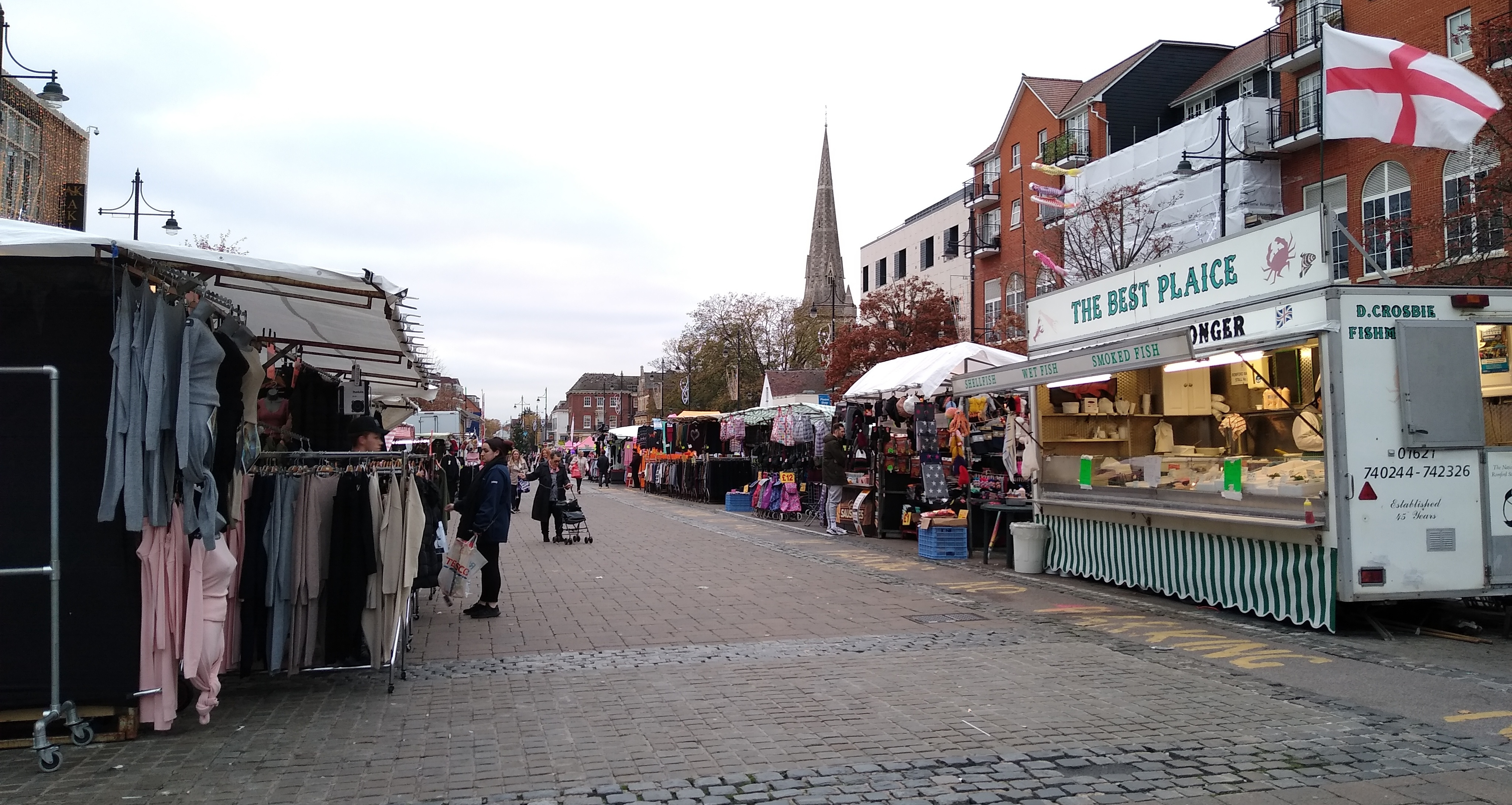
- Romford Market
- Location: Tollgate House, Market Place; Romford, England; 51.57912°N 0.18170°E
- Opening date: 1247 (779 years ago)
- Management: Havering London Borough Council
- Owner: Havering London Borough Council
- Environment: Outdoor
- Goods sold: General goods, food
- Days normally open: Wednesday, Friday, Saturday (Note: Sunday market was operating from July 2020 to March 2024)
- Number of tenants: 60 (as of July 2020)
- Parking: Yes
- Website: havering.gov.uk/romfordmarket
- Interactive map of Romford Market

Romford Market is a large outdoor retail market located in Romford in the London Borough of Havering, England. The market right was established by royal order in 1247. Rival markets are prohibited within 6.66 miles (10.72 km). Governance of the market was strengthened by the 1465 charter of the Liberty of Havering, which was administered from a court house at the western end of the market. Formerly a livestock and agricultural market, cattle was last sold in 1958. The market has been in local authority ownership since it was purchased by the Romford Local Board in 1892 and is now owned by Havering Council. The marketplace was located on the main east–west road through the town until traffic was diverted away from the market in 1969. The market is promoted as a filming location. It is open on Wednesday, Friday and Saturday. There was a Sunday market from July 2020 to March 2024. As of July 2020 it has 60 licensed traders, down from a peak of over 300.

== History ==
=== Market of the Havering manor ===
It originated as a sheep market that was operating by 1247. The market right on Wednesdays was established by royal writ in 1247, although no charter was issued. Under common law no other market is permitted to set up within a day's sheep drive, which is taken to be 6.66 miles (10.72 km) from the marketplace.

The 1247 market right did not provide for the governance for the market. By the 15th century, it had become popular with buyers and sellers from the City of London and other areas outside of Havering, who were beyond the authority of the manorial court and therefore outside of its powers of enforcement. This caused the prominent families in Havering to seek new rights in a charter in 1465. The manor gained status as the Liberty of Havering, with paid officers including a clerk of the market. A court house (also known as the market house) was located at the western end of the market. This housed the clerk of the market and other liberty officers.

Reflecting the change in focus of the town towards the market, the Church of St Edward the Confessor was built to the north of the marketplace around 1410.

The market was famous for leather goods by the 15th century, which were manufactured in Hornchurch and Romford. Havering residents were exempt from tolls to use the market, which were being charged by 1619.

The market is the subject of a 1726 legal case called Keech v. Sandford. This is one of the foundational cases of English trust law, on the fiduciary duty of loyalty.

=== Era of change ===
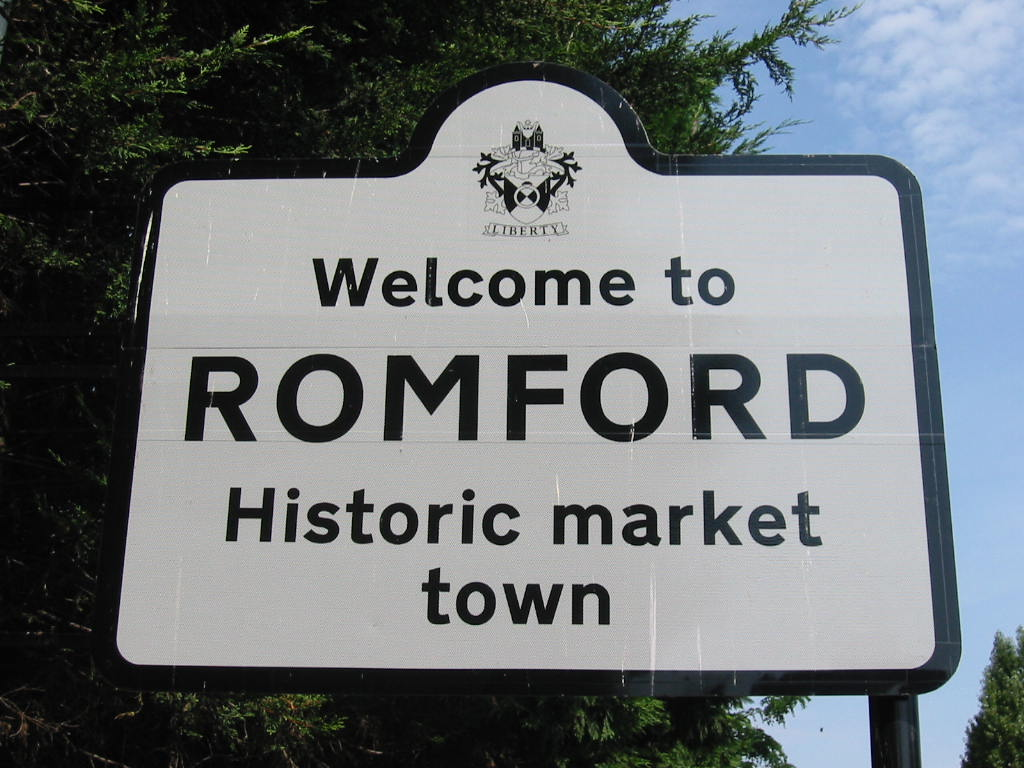
Welcome sign on the edge of Romford

In 1819 improvement commissioners were set up for the market place and principal streets of the town. They were empowered to levy rates for paving, lighting, watching, and cleansing. The church was rebuilt in 1849/1850 and was designated as a listed building in 1952, with the adjacent 15th/16th century Church House.

The market was the property of the Crown until 1828, when the manor of Havering was sold to Hugh McIntosh. On his death in 1840 it passed to his son David McIntosh. When David died in 1881 it passed to his widow, Charlotte McIntosh. Romford Local Board made several unsuccessful attempts to lease the market from Charlotte McIntosh between 1882 and 1887. There was a legal dispute between them in 1887 about the location of a weighbridge in the market, which the local board believed was blocking a right of way. McIntosh won the case. In 1889 the local board turned down an offer to lease the market, claiming that it was in decline. The opening of the London, Tilbury and Southend Railway stations at Dagenham, Hornchurch and Upminster in 1885 had made it easier to reach Barking Market from those communities.

Until the early 19th century the market was mostly used for the sale of cattle. By the end of that century the eastern end was used for the sale of pigs and cattle whereas at the western end farm tools, clothing, fruit and vegetables could be found. It was a major agricultural market during the 18th and 19th centuries, with a corn exchange established in 1845, enlarged in 1861, and closed in 1924.

In 1892 the Board of Agriculture ordered the closure of the market, because of a failure to complete paving and drainage works. It was decided at a public meeting that year for the local board to purchase the market and complete the works. The market and old court house were purchased for £7,000 in 1892. The market house building was used as offices by the Romford Local Board and then Romford Urban District Council until 1931. It was demolished in 1933, to make way for the Quadrant Arcade.

The market gained a reputation for the black market sales of rationed goods during and immediately after the Second World War.

The livestock market went into decline after the Second World War. The last sale of horses took place on 13 May 1948. The sale of cattle in the market ended on 21 May 1958, giving way to food, clothing and household goods.

The 1965 Romford central area redevelopment plan led to the demolition of buildings to the south of the market. The market and adjacent streets were designated a conservation area on 1 April 1968. The market was located on the high street, the main east–west road through the town. In 1969 through road traffic was removed from the market as part of the development of the Romford ring road. In 1973 there were around 325 regular traders.

The Lamb and the Golden Lion public houses became listed buildings in 1979.

=== Recent history ===
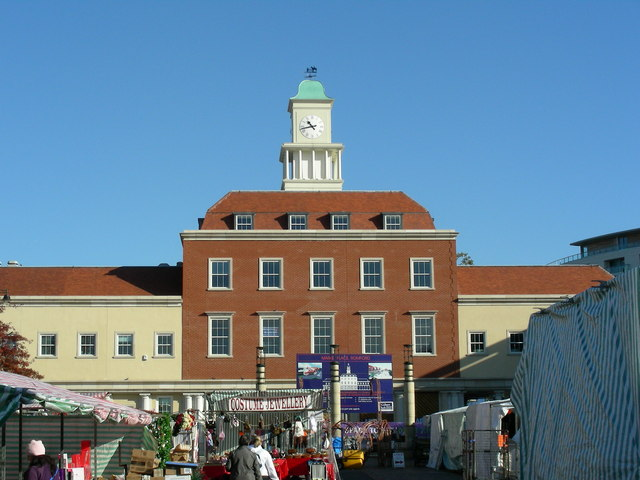
Tollgate House is located at the eastern end of the market

In 1989 Havering Council objected to the creation of a market in Ilford, using the rights of 1247.

The marketplace is promoted as a location for filming. In 2005 it was used to film parts of the music video for Voodoo People (Pendulum Remix) by The Prodigy.

It was noted by the council that the number of traders was in long-term decline with 339 traders in 1985, 266 traders in 1995 and 170 traders in 2005. By 2015 the number of regular traders had declined to 90.

Romford Market
| Year | Licensed traders |
|---|---|
| 1985 | 339 |
| 1995 | 226(-33%) |
| 2005 | 170(-25%) |
| 2015 | 90(-47%) |

In 2010 the layout of the market was altered to provide wider aisles, better access from the Liberty Shopping Centre and improved electricity supply to the stalls.

The market was closed from 24 March to 3 June 2020 because of the COVID-19 pandemic in the United Kingdom. As of July 2020 the market had 60 regular traders.

The Romford business improvement district (BID) was created in 2019, covering the town centre and market. Since 2021, two pitches in the market are sponsored by the BID at weekends between April and October to introduce new small businesses to the market.

Regular opening on Sunday began in July 2020. The Sunday market closed in March 2024 as part of Havering Council budget cuts.

In 2023 Havering Council attempted to use the market rights to block the opening of the consolidated Dagenham Dock wholesale market to the general public.

== Operation ==
The market is owned and operated by Havering Council. It is open on Wednesday, Friday and Saturday. The Wednesday market is operated using the 1247 rights. On other days provisions of the Food Act 1984 (c. 30) are used as the legal basis.

== Transport ==
The market is a hub on the London Bus network with services from stops on St Edwards Way to Canning Town, Leytonstone, Stratford, Rainham, Dagenham, Barkingside, Cranham, Barking, Ilford and Central London.
