= Gillian Gear =

- Gillian Gear promoting the Barnet & District Local History Society
- Born: 1943
- Died: 29 September 2015 (aged 71–72)
- Occupation: historian

Gillian Carol Gear, BEM (1943 – 29 September 2015) was an English local historian who was archivist of north London's Barnet Museum and helped to ensure the survival of the museum after funding was withdrawn by the London Borough of Barnet.

== Early life and family ==
Gillian Carol Pymm was born in 1943 and received her basic education at Mount Grace School. She married Michael Gear and they had three sons, Nicholas, Timothy and Christopher.

== Career ==
Gear was a specialist in local history who gained an MA in social and industrial history from Middlesex University and a PhD on industrial schools from the University of London.

She was archivist of Barnet Museum and helped to ensure the survival of the museum after funding was withdrawn by the London Borough of Barnet. She was secretary of Barnet Museum and Local History Society and of the Hertfordshire Association for Local History.

She was co founder and long term Chair of East Barnet residence association and was central to the preservation of Church Farm Fields, oak hill park.

Long term secretary of the Church farm family swimming club aka sunday morning swimming.

Gear was awarded the British Empire Medal in the 2014 Birthday Honours, "For services to History in the London Borough of Barnet and Hertfordshire".

== Death ==
Towards the end of her life, Gear suffered from ill health and received hospital treatment. She died on 29 September 2015 and was survived by her husband and sons.

== Selected publications ==
- The Boys' Farm Home Church Farm East Barnet. Barnet Museum & Local History Society, 1986. (revised 2010)
- Barnet and District Local History Society celebrates 60 Years of Local History 1927 - 1987. Barnet & District Local History Society, 1988. ISBN 0951334204
- Barnet and the Hadleys in Old Photographs: A Second Selection. Sutton Publishing, 1996. ISBN 0750911093 (Britain in Old Photographs)
- Community Life in Hertfordshire 2000. Hertfordshire Association for Local History, 2001. ISBN 095412510X
- Little Grove House and Grounds. Barnet Museum & Local History Society, 2006.
- The Diary of Benjamin Woodcock Master of the Barnet Union Workhouse 1836-1838. (Editor)
- A Caring County? Social Welfare in Hertfordshire from 1600. University of Hertfordshire Press, 2013. ISBN 1909291129 (With Steve King)
