= Hertfordshire Association for Local History =

The Hertfordshire Association for Local History exists to promote the study and enjoyment of history in Hertfordshire, England. The association publishes a journal, Herts Past and Present, and a book series, Hertfordshire Publications, in association with the University of Hertfordshire Press. The Hertfordshire Publications book series has been in existence for over 40 years and has been an imprint of the university since 2001.

== Selected publications ==
- Gear, Gillian. (2001) Community Life in Hertfordshire 2000. ISBN 095412510X
- Munby, Lionel M. (2001) The Common People are Not Nothing: Conflict in Religion and Politics in Hertfordshire, 1575–1780. ISBN 0901354805
- Tomkins, Malcolm. (2001) So That Was Hertfordshire: Travellers' Jottings 1322–1887. ISBN 0901354872
- King, Steve, & Gillian Gear. (2013) A Caring County? Social Welfare in Hertfordshire from 1600. University of Hertfordshire Press. ISBN 1909291129
- Lockyear, Kris. (Ed.) (2015) Archaeology in Hertfordshire: Recent Research A Festschrift for Tony Rook. University of Hertfordshire Press. ISBN 978-1909291423
