= List of people from the London Borough of Barnet =

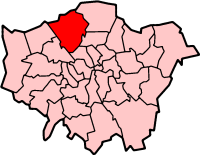
Location of the London Borough of Barnet within Greater London

Among those who were born in the London Borough of Barnet, or have dwelt within the border of the modern borough are (alphabetical order, within category):

== Notable residents ==
	Key to "Notes" regarding the residents' affiliation to Barnet
Letter	Description
B	Indicates that the resident was born in Barnet.
D	Indicates that the resident died in Barnet.
I	Indicates that the subject is buried in Barnet.
L	Indicates that the resident lived in Barnet.
	Citations in the Notes box refer to the information in the entire row

=== Academia and research ===
Name	Notability	District	Notes
William Cattley	For whom the orchid species cattleya was named		
Peter Collinson	Botanist	Mill Hill	
Harold Hopkins	Physicist		
John Strugnell	Dead Sea Scrolls editor-in-chief and Harvard Professor		

=== Arts and entertainment ===
Name	Notability	District	Notes
Katrina Kaif	Indian-British actress in Bollywood		B
Anthony Andrews	Actor		
Richard Baker	Newsreader		
Peter Banks	Musician		B,D
Stephanie Beacham	Actress		
Claire Bloom	Actress		
Emma Bunton	Singer	Finchley	
Dave Colwell	Guitar		
Shelley Conn	Actress		
Nadine Coyle	Singer	Chipping Barnet	
Paul Carrack	Keyboards and Singer	Chipping Barnet	
D. C. Eyles	Illustrator and comics artist		
Andy Ellison	Singer	Finchley	
Samantha Fox	Model and singer		
Robert Fripp	Musician		
Morgan Fisher	Keyboards	Finchley	
Alan A. Freeman	Record producer	Hendon	L
Johnny Franz	Record producer and accompanist	Hampstead Garden Suburb	L
Devin Griffin	BBC Radio 1 DJ (commonly known as Dev)		
Trevor Howard	Actor		
Dhani Harrison	Singer	Chipping Barnet	
Jade Jones	Singer	Finchley	
Howard Jones	Singer	Chipping Barnet	
Cariad Lloyd	Actress, writer and comedian		
Tony Maudsley	Actor		
Jo Maxwell-Muller	Actress	Hendon	
Stephen Merchant	Actor, writer and comedian		
George Michael	Singer and songwriter	Finchley	
Monica Michael	Singer-songwriter		
Spike Milligan	Comedian	Finchley	L
Bob Monkhouse	Comedian		
Sir Roger Moore	Actor		
Eric Morecambe	Comedian		
Billy Nicholls	Singer		
Elaine Paige	Singer and actress		
Nick Papadimitriou	Author		
Frederick Peisley	Actor		
Steve Pemberton	Actor		
David Pentecost	Composer (Lived at Torrington Cottage, Church Path/Lodge Lane, 1940 to 1965)	Finchley	L
Anna Popplewell	Actress		
Angharad Rees	Actress (born in Edgware Hospital and lived at 13 Engel Park, Mill Hill, until she was 2)		
Sir Cliff Richard	Singer		
Daniel Roche	Actor		
Peter Sellers	Comedian		
Feargal Sharkey	Singer		
Reece Shearsmith	Actor		
David Shepherd	Painter		
Sir Donald Sinden	Actor (lived at 60, Temple Fortune Lane, Hampstead Garden Suburb 1954–1997)		L
Marc Sinden	Film director, actor and theatre producer		
Jerry Shirley	Drummer		
Mike Skinner	Rapper and music producer		
John Somerville	Sculptor		
Jerry Springer	TV personality (born at East Finchley, or possibly Highgate)		B
Steven Stapleton	Musician		
Andy Summers	Musician		
Zak Starkey	Drums	Chipping Barnet	
Terry-Thomas	Actor/comedian	Finchley	B
Lee Thompson	Musician	Finchley	
Simon Townshend	Singer	Finchley	
Alan Tilvern	Actor		
Tamás Vásáry	Pianist and conductor		
Johnny Vaughan	Radio presenter		
Mark Vidler	Record producer, remixer, DJ		
Marc Warren	Actor	Finchley	L
Amy Winehouse	Singer-songwriter	Southgate	I, L
Sir Norman Wisdom	Actor/comedian		
Rick Wills	Bass Guitar	Finchley	

=== Crime ===
- Owen Suffolk – Australian transported convict and bushranger (born in Finchley in c.1830)

=== Design ===
- Harry Beck – designer of the original Tube map

=== Travel and exploration ===
Name	Notability	District	Notes
Celia Fiennes	Early recreational traveller, the first recorded woman to visit every county in England	Mill Hill	L
David Livingstone			

=== Judiciary ===
- Sir William Shee, the first Roman Catholic judge to sit in England and Wales since the Reformation

=== Literature ===
Name	Notability	District	Notes
Fleur Adcock	Poet		
Kingsley Amis	Novelist and poet	Barnet	L
Martin Amis	Novelist	Barnet	L
Alison Weir	Novelist, historian	Barnet	L
Charles Dickens	Novelist	Finchley	L
Sally Laird	Writer, editor and translator		B
Tim Parks	Novelist (his semi-autobiographical Tongues of Flame is set in the North Finchley of 1968)	Finchley	
Samuel Pepys	Writer		
Will Self	Novelist, reviewer and columnist	Finchley	L

=== Journalism and the media ===
Name	Notability	District	Notes
Stephen Douglas	Journalist, ITV		
Richard Baker	Broadcaster		
Mark Kermode	Film critic	Finchley	
John Kennedy O'Connor	Broadcaster & writer	Finchley	

=== Politics and government ===
Name	Notability	District	Notes
John Bercow	Former Speaker of the House of Commons and the Member of Parliament for Buckingham	Edgware	B
Cyril Bibby	prospective Labour Party candidate opposing Reginald Maudling in 1958–1959		
Robert Carr (Baron Carr of Hadley)	Conservative politician		
Sir Sydney Chapman	Local MP 1979–2005		
Nick Griffin	Political Leader of the BNP		
Octavia Hill	Social reformer		L
Sir Stamford Raffles	Founder of Singapore	Mill Hill	L
Reginald Maudling	Local MP 1950–1979		
Sir Vincent Tewson	TUC General Secretary	Arkley	
Margaret Thatcher	Local MP and Conservative Prime Minister of the United Kingdom, 1979–1990		
William Wilberforce	Politician, philanthropist and a leader of the movement to abolish the slave trade	Mill Hill	L
John Wilkes	Radical, journalist and politician	Mill Hill	

=== Sport and games ===
Name	Notability	District	Notes
Jayden Bennetts	Footballer		
Keanan Bennetts	Footballer	Edgware	
David Crawley	Gaelic football player		
C. B. Fry	Polymath best known as a cricketer	Childs Hill	L D
Darren Gerard	Cricketer		
Noni Madueke	Footballer		
Mark Thomson	Darts	Finchley	
Phil Tufnell	Cricketer	Finchley	
Ram Vaswani	Professional poker and snooker player		
Peter Wells	Olympic high jumper		
