= 53 Wood Street =

House in Chipping Barnet, London

Coordinates: 51.652710°N 0.203937°W

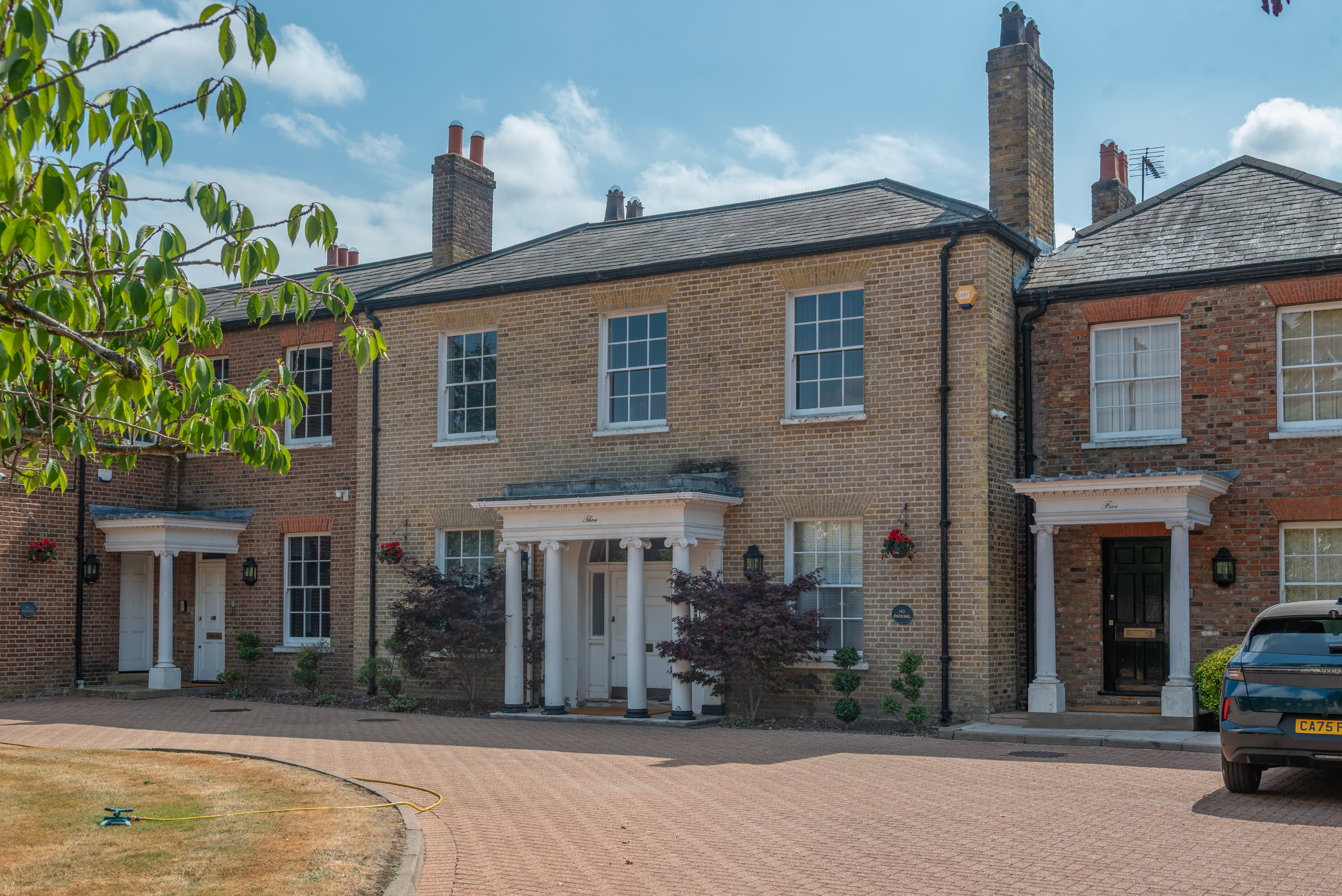
- Interactive map of the 53 Wood Street area

General information
- Status: Grade II listed
- Type: House
- Location: Wood Street, Chipping Barnet
- Completed: Early 1800s

53 Wood Street is a grade II listed house at Wood Street in the market town of Chipping Barnet, a northern suburb of London in the United Kingdom. The house dates from the early 1800s and has a distinctive central porch with four ionic columns.
