= Barnet Fair (film) =

1896 film

- Produced by: Birt Acres
- Release date: 1896
- Country: United Kingdom
- Language: Silent

Barnet Fair is an 1896 British short black-and-white silent actuality film produced by Birt Acres. The surviving portion shows roundabouts at the fair and can be viewed on the BFI Player (for free, if in the UK). This was the first moving picture record of the event. Birt Acres would go on to make five further films of the fair in 1897.

The Barnet Fair had begun in the 16th century and was originally held twice a year before becoming an annual event. Up until the 20th century it mainly involved the sale of horses and other livestock.

== See also ==
- List of films about horses
