= Church House Publishing =

Official publisher of the Church of England

- Parent company: Archbishops' Council
- Founded: 1986
- Country of origin: United Kingdom
- Headquarters location: Church House, Westminster; London
- Distribution: Norwich Books and Music
- Publication types: Books
- Official website: www.chpublishing.co.uk

Church House Publishing is the official publisher of the Church of England and was founded in 1986.
