= Kennaway House =

Townhouse in Devon, England

Coordinates: 50.6798°N 3.2412°W

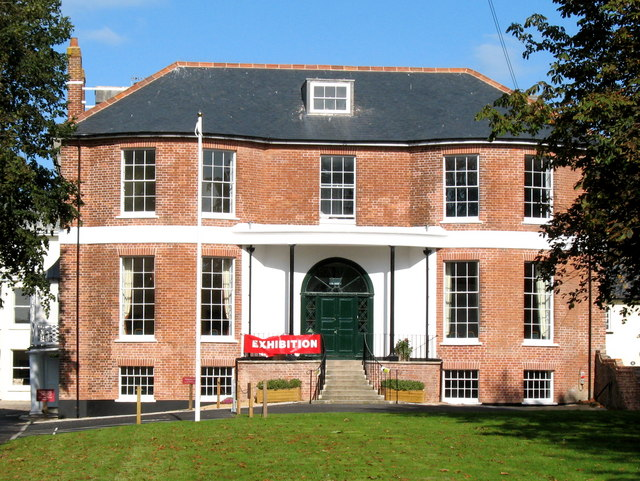
Kennaway House in 2009

Kennaway House is a Regency town house in Sidmouth, East Devon, which was formerly known as Fort House and Church House. It is a Grade II* listed building.

Fort House was built about 1805 and soon came into the ownership of the Kennaway family of Escot House near Ottery St Mary. The Kennaways resettled at Escot after 1838. By the end of the 19th century the house was in use as a lodging house. Richard Hatton Wood bought it in 1905 and on 6 July 1906 the house was transferred by deed to a newly created Church House Trust. Although not legally connected to the neighbouring Church of St. Giles & St. Nicholas, the building became Church House and its Trustees were given the express duty of using the house:

“for such purposes only as Church House may properly be used. For.. promoting...any work in support of or for the benefit or in connection with the Church of England including Home and Foreign Missions or for Sunday schools, Bible Classes, Church Lads Brigade, Lectures, Mothers’ Meetings, Sacred Concerts, Choir Practices, Parish Clubs or Societies.”

The same deeds also specifically prohibited certain activities deemed unsuitable: “not dancing or such like and not antagonistic to or inconsistent with the continuance of well-being of the Church of England..”

The house gradually fell into disrepair until by 2001 parts of it were dangerous and its future uncertain. A campaign was launched, led by Dr Michael James, to raise funds of £1 million needed for restoration. National Lottery funding was obtained in 2006 to cover half the cost and grants made by the Town, District and County Councils and a number of private foundations. The Friends of Kennaway House raised over £100,000 in local fund-raising events. Restoration began in 2008 and the house was renamed Kennaway House after a public ballot in the local newspaper The Sidmouth Herald.

It was reopened on 4 July 2009 by Hugo Swire, member of parliament for East Devon as a gallery and arts centre and a facility for private and community events. It is licensed for civil weddings and partnerships. It is owned and managed by the Kennaway House Trust, which is a registered charity no. 1122667.
