= Barnet Fair =

Annual fair in London

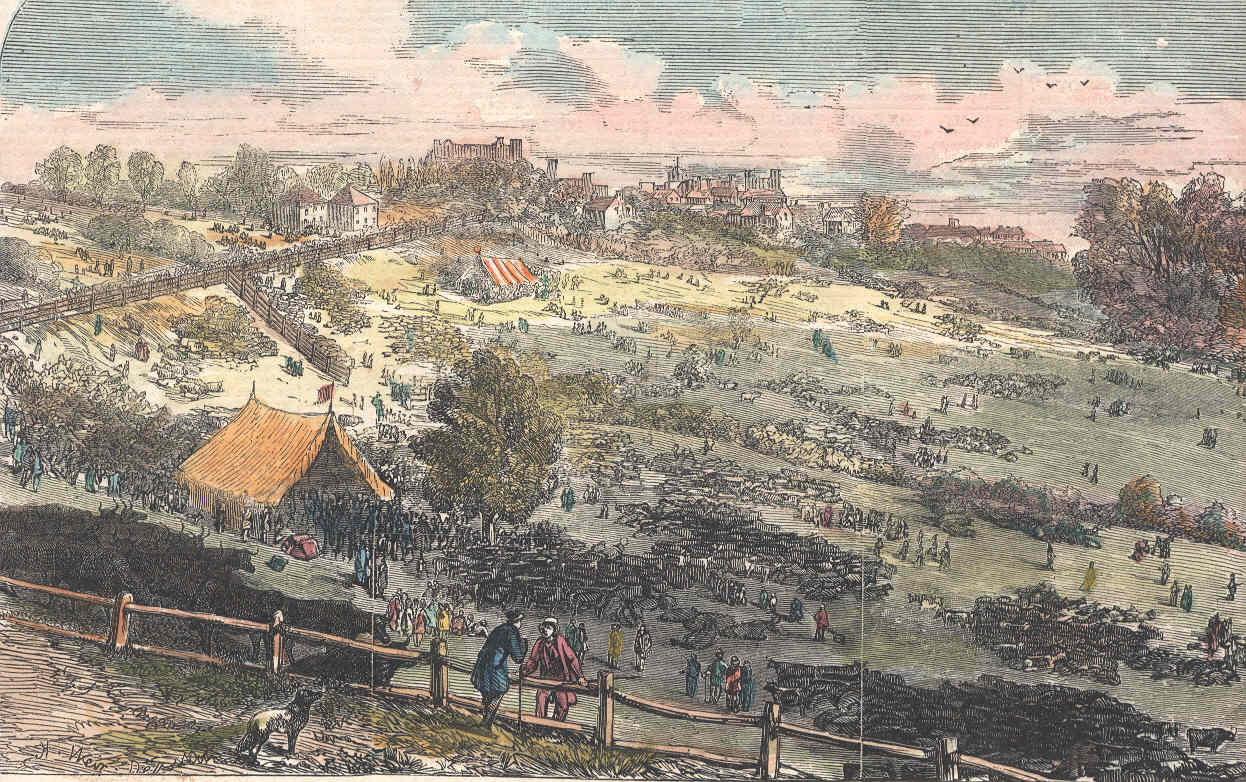
Cattle at Barnet Fair c. 1849

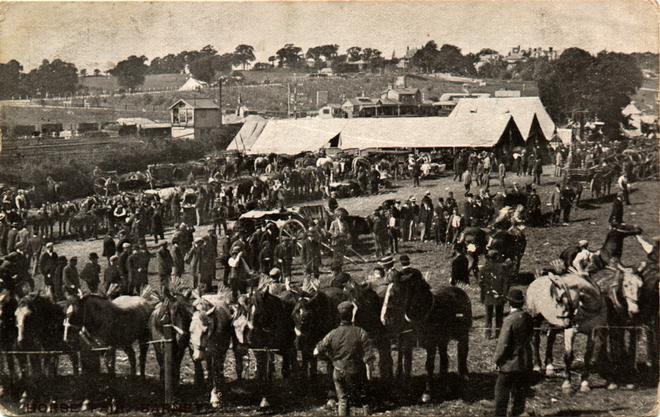
Barnet horse fair

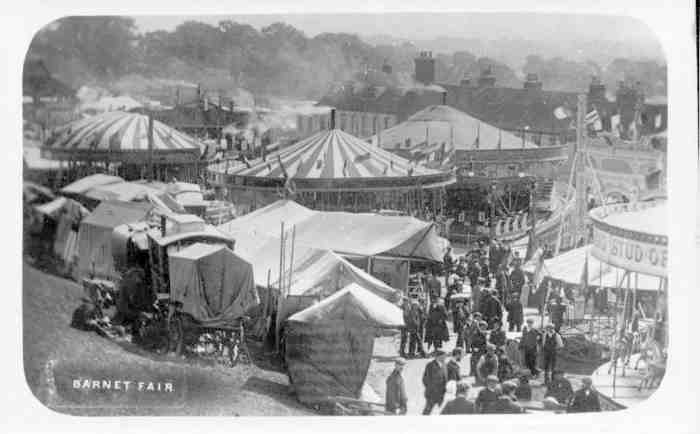
The funfair

Barnet Fair is an annual horse and pleasure fair held near Mays Lane, Barnet, England, on the first Monday in September.

The Fair takes place over three days starting on 4 September. It still operates under its royal Charter which is issued to Barnet council. The focus in the present-day Fair is no longer on horses and other livestock; but it is rather a pleasure fair instead.

== History ==
The fair began in 1588 when Queen Elizabeth I granted a charter to the Lord of the Manor of Barnet to hold a fair twice yearly, in addition to the weekly Barnet Market. Originally held in June and October, Lord John Tomlinson changed the dates to April and September in 1758 for the reason of improving business. From 1881, the April fair ceased.

The focus of the fair was its livestock, with animals being brought from across the United Kingdom. In 1834, The Times reported that Barnet Fair was England's largest cattle market, with up to 40,000 animals on display.

From the eighteenth century, the festivities also used to include horse racing, although these ceased in 1870 when the railway station was built on the ground in which they had been held.

== Popular culture ==
In 1896, a film was made about Barnet Fair, entitled Barnet Horse Fair.

The term 'Barnet Fair', normally shortened to 'Barnet', has become rhyming slang for 'hair'.

"Barnet Fair" is the name of a song by Steeleye Span.

Thomas E. Browne, Hackney ARP Warden diarist notes Saturday September 5, 1942 how, “When I arrived at Barnet, about 50 donkeys were being driven along the High Street to the cries of “Oh! Oh!” and holding up the traffic. Quite an interesting sight. I believe they were going to the Barnet Fair, being held at the foot of the hill. Very windy today, but bright & sunny.”

== See also ==
- Artisanal food
- Bazaar
- Charter
- Hawker
- History of marketing
- List of Renaissance fairs
- Market town
- Marketing
- Market (place)
- Merchant
- Peddler
- Retail
- Town privileges
