= Church House, Barnet =

Building in Greater London, England

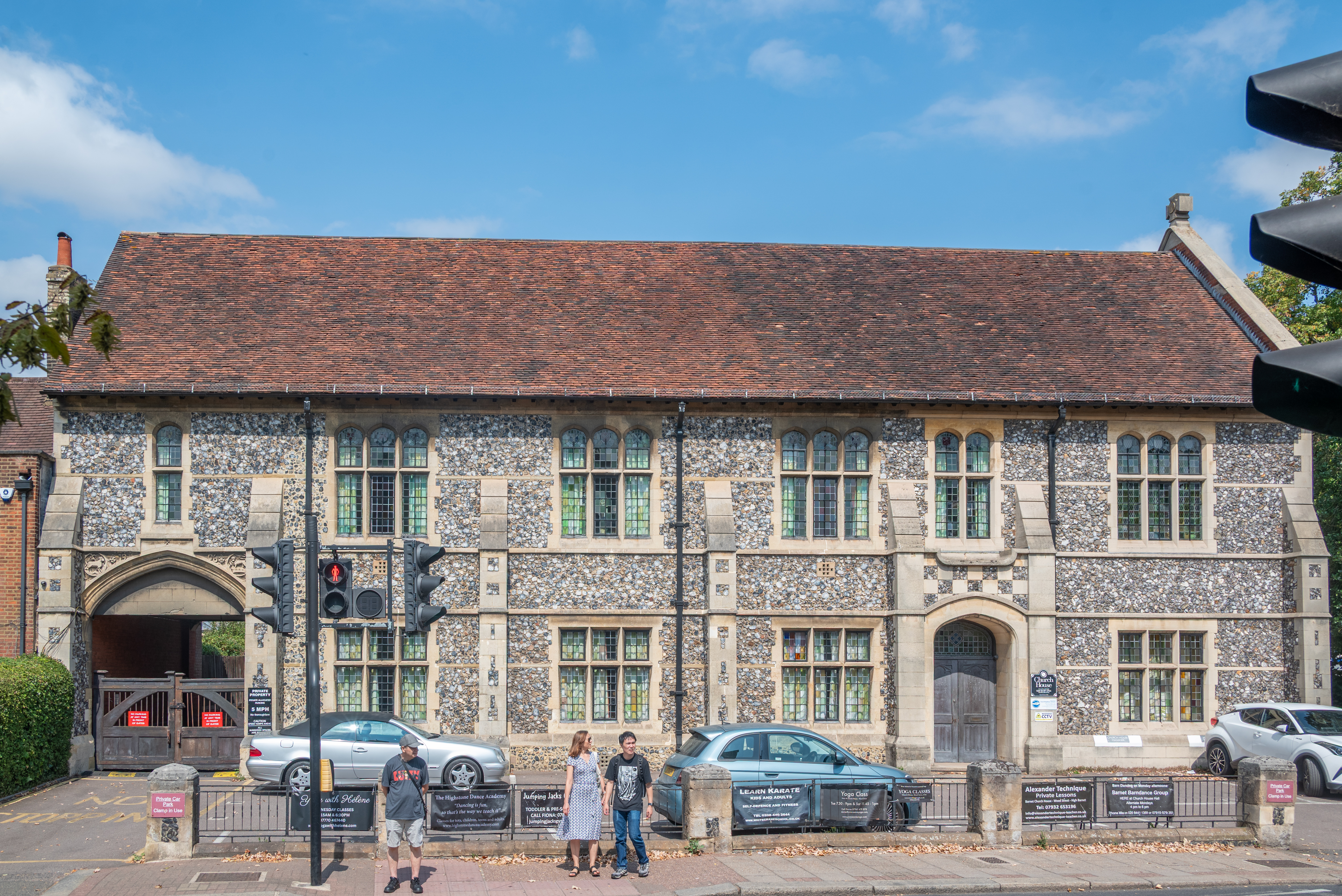
- The front of Church House as seen from Wood Street
- Interactive map of the Church House, Barnet area

General information
- Location: Church House; 2 Wood Street; Barnet; Herts, EN5 4BW
- Coordinates: 51°39′11.3″N 0°12′6.5″W
- Construction started: c. 1906
- Inaugurated: 11 February 1907

Website
- churchhousebarnet.co.uk

Church House is a building located in High Barnet (also known as Chipping Barnet) and is a venue for a variety of different community activities and functions. Church House is also the name of the charity that operates the building as a not-for-profit. The building was first opened in 1907, and has been operating as a charity since 1920.

== History ==
In 1679 James Ravenscroft, a wealthy benefactor in Barnet, conveyed by deed 3½ acres of land at Stebenheath, now Stepney, to the Chancel Estate Trustees – a group of representatives of each of the churches in the local Parish who were entrusted with the Ravenscroft Estate. Ravenscroft proposed that the land should be sold to raise funds to help maintain Ravenscroft Chapel – a chapel he had erected inside Barnet Parish Church in memory of his father, Thomas Ravenscroft, who died in 1630.

In the course of time the land at Stepney was developed and built on, and its eventual sale yielded a sum far greater than could be used for the purposes originally cited by Ravenscroft. The Chancel Estate Trustees therefore decided that the remaining funds should be used for other projects, and among those projects was Church House.

The first plans for Church House were drawn up in 1897, and building work finally commenced in 1906.

A committee to oversee the management of Church House was formed soon after the building's completion later that same year. This committee consisted of the Rector, licensed clergy, the churchwardens, a Chancel Estate Trustee, as well as three members of the Congregation of Barnet Parish Church, who were selected by the other members of the committee.

The committee oversaw the official opening of Church House on 11 February 1907.

=== 1907–1920: Early use ===
At first the building was primarily for Parish use only, but it was soon made available for other functions such as weddings and dances – one of the first applicants for the hire of the hall was for six dances in aid of the Children's Hospital in Park Road, Barnet. It was agreed early on, however, that no political meetings were allowed in Church House.

In 1908 a temporary building was erected at the rear of Church House and was used by the Scout Group as their Barnet headquarters.

On March 28, 1910 the Church House Committee handed over all of Church House's accounts and inventory to the Chancel Estate.

=== 1920: The formation of the charity ===
The Chancel Estate were responsible for the management of Church House up until 1920 when, in September, the Charity Commissioners agreed that a separate charity should be set up to manage Church House. A group of Trustees of this new charity was formed. It was agreed at the time that the Trustee's group should comprise nine competent persons, including the Rector and two churchwardens – who were each to be ex officio – and six representative Trustees, of whom at least three should be women; an agreement that still stands to this day.

The building was used almost daily during the 1920s by various church organisations, including mother's meetings, King's messengers, Guild of Bell ringers, Mother's Unions, Communicant's Guild, the Ladies Working Party, and the Girls Friendly Society. Dances and Whist drives were also very popular during this period.

In the 1930s Church House was the venue for a local traders fête, which was held to help local tradesmen earn extra income during a period that was still feeling the effects of the post war recession.

=== 1936: Extending Church House ===
In 1936 proposals were made to extend Church House. These proposals included the demolition of the building at the south end, and the erection of a new building in Church Passage to adjoin the Hyde Institute. It was planned that part of this new extension was to be rented out by the Barnet Library Committee, and in October 1938 the Hertfordshire County Council approved a 23-year lease. The library in fact remained in Church House premises until 1992, 54 years later.

=== 1939–1947: The Second World War ===
The extension was completed in December 1939. However, due to the outbreak of the Second World War it was decided not to fit the kitchen with equipment, as it was expected that the building would be requisitioned by the military as soon as it was completed.

In January 1940, this indeed happened, and Church House was taken over by Eastern Command for use by the Royal Army Pay Corps. RAPC retained the building until October 1940, at which time the local council took control on behalf of the Ministry of Food, and turned it into a British Restaurant, which were communal kitchens set up throughout the country to help people who had been bombed out of their homes or had run out of ration coupons.

The building was finally de-requisitioned and returned to the care of the Trustees in November 1946.

During the war Church House sustained minor damage caused by bombs that had fallen nearby. Although the bomb damage itself wasn't extensive, the building was in a dilapidated state following six years of heavy use by the military and local council. As a result, the War Damage Commission agreed to help fund temporary repairs. The Reverend at the time, Revd. Ben Farrer, was also instrumental in helping to raise funds to restore Church House.

During these repairs a Social Services hut was erected at the rear of Church House, and the Scout Group decided to demolish their old “temporary” headquarters and erect a new one.

Church House was finally restored and fit for its intended use by February 1947.

=== Present day ===
Church House has been in constant use since the Second World War, and it continues to be a venue for local events such as meetings, children's groups, Girl Guides, dancing groups, keep-fit classes, yoga, badminton, and adult dance groups.

In 1989 the quality and design of Church House merited that it be designated as a Building of Architectural Interest by the Department of the Environment. The building is listed with grade II status with Historic England.
