= Luke A. Church House =

Coordinates: 37.6416°N 120.9886°W

The Luke A. Church House is the oldest house in Modesto, California, United States. It was originally built in 1865 or 1868 in Paradise by Luke Ancil Church (December 28, 1831 – February 6, 1901), who used lumber from his hotel at Don Pedro Bar. In 1870, Church moved the house to Modesto, where it currently stands at 302 Burney Street.
