= Philetus S. Church House =

Historic house in Michigan, United States

- U.S. National Register of Historic Places
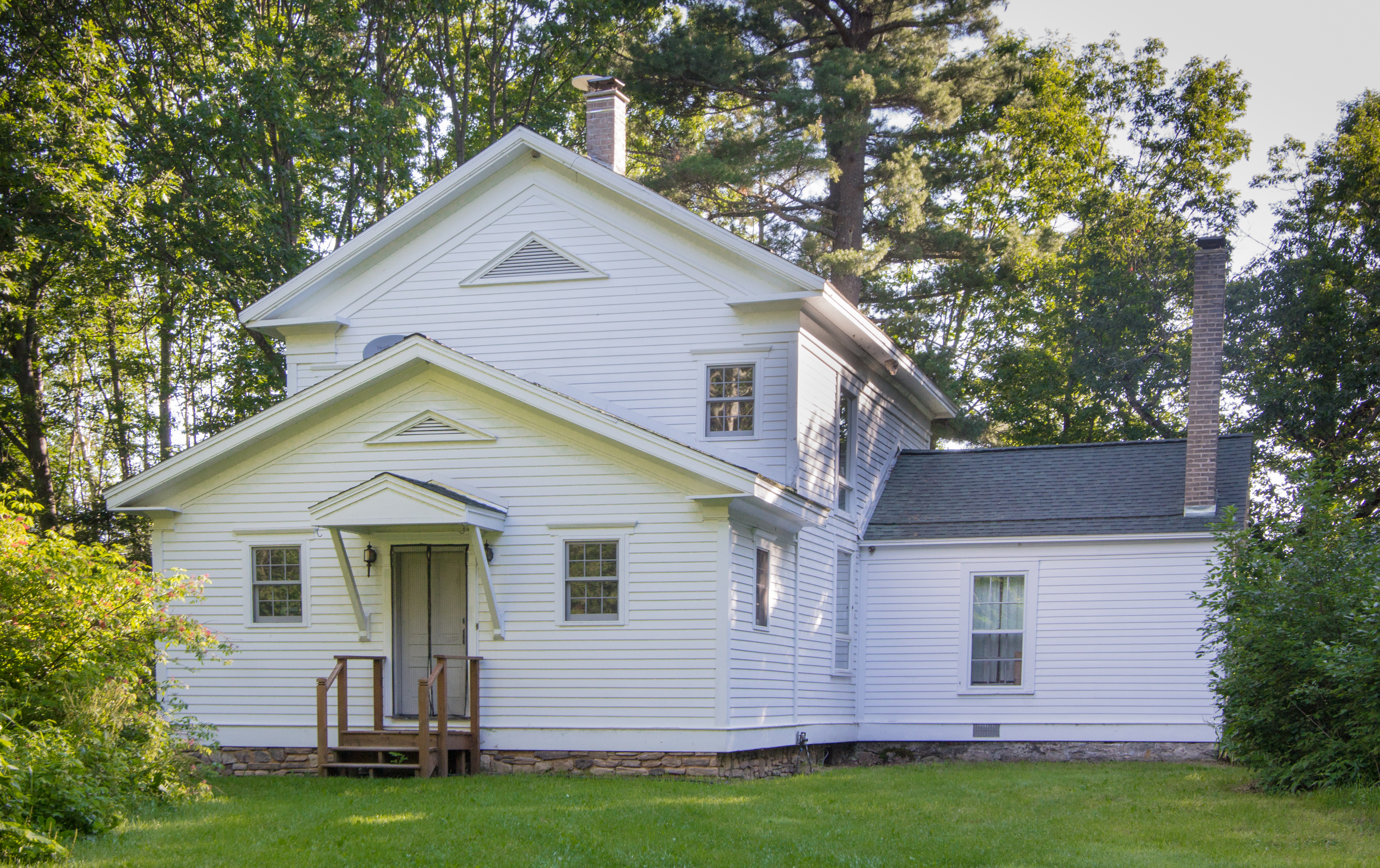

- Location within Michigan Location within the United States
- Interactive map
- Location: North Shore Rd., Sugar Island, Michigan
- Coordinates: 46°31′16″N 84°7′21″W
- Area: 2 acres (0.81 ha)
- Built: 1862
- Built by: J. Wells Church
- Architectural style: Greek Revival
- NRHP reference No.: 82000495
- Added to NRHP: November 24, 1982

The Philetus S. Church House is a private house located on North Shore Road, 1 mile (1.6 km) southeast of Payment Settlement on Sugar Island, Michigan. The building is the last structure from Church's Landing, a mid-19th century trading post and steamboat stop. It was listed on the National Register of Historic Places in 1982.

== Philetus Swift Church ==
Philetus Swift Church was born in 1812 in Riga, New York, the son of Jesse and Margery Munsen Church. He was named for Philetus Swift, whom his father had fought under in the War of 1812. He attended local schools and spent some time in an academy in Palmyra, New York. In 1831, Church hired on as a store clerk in Byron, New York, and in 1835 moved to Oakfield, New York to start his own business. In 1837, he married Elizabeth Duncan Wells, a granddaughter of Samuel Taggart. The couple had three sons, one of whom died in infancy. The other two were Jesse Wells Church and Philetus Church Jr.

Church remained in Oakfield and the nearby Caryville until 1841; during this time he over-extended himself in supporting the founding of a local school and went bankrupt. In 1841 he moved to Detroit and began clerking at a store there. In 1845, Church traveled north intending to search for copper, but instead became engaged in business in Sault Ste. Marie, Michigan.

== History of Church's Landing ==
In 1846, Philetus and Elizabeth Church and their sons Jesse Wells and Philetus Jr. moved to Sugar Island and founded the settlement of Church's Landing at this site. There they built a trading post and house and began trading with the Indians living there. As his business increased, Church increased the size of his facilities. Church's landing eventually contained two docks, a sawmill, dry-dock, and a small shipyard.

Church's Landing was a natural stopping point for ships, so Church began supplying passing steamships with wood for their boilers. He also dealt in furs, maple syrup, vegetables, ice, milk, and soap. Church erected a sawmill and shingle-mill, and sold shingles, fence posts, pilings, and telegraph poles in addition to steamboat wood. The family also began a shipbuilding business in about 1853. The businesses at Church's Landing eventually employed up to 35 people, and by 1861 was doing $17,000 to $27,000 worth of business annually. Additional settlers joined Church to live at the location.

In 1850, Juliette Augusta Magill Kinzie of Chicago was on a pleasure cruise and stopped at Church's Landing to take on wood. The Churches provided her with some refreshments, including raspberry jam; Kinzie immediately took a liking to it and purchased some. Back in Chicago, she used it in entertaining friends, leading to a demand for Church's raspberry jam. The next year, Church began making raspberry jam for market, a business that by 1878 had increased such that he was manufacturing six to twelve tons of jam yearly, up to the level that the Sugar Island crop could support. A contemporaneous account also notes that the Church family was "noted for the making of raspberry jam, which is sold in large quantities, and shipped to Eastern and Southern markets."

In 1862, Jesse Wells Church constructed a house for his father, mother, and brother, using materials from the family sawmill. In addition to Juliette Kinzie, many other celebrities stopped by Church's Landing while their ships were taking on wood, and while there visited the Churches. These include Horace Greeley, Charles Sumner, John McLean, and Mary Todd Lincoln.

In 1868, Jesse Wells Church, then a medical doctor, moved to Traverse City, Michigan and then to Harbor Island (near Drummond Island) with his wife and children. There he continued the family shipbuilding business, building craft until at least 1910. Elizabeth Church died in 1876, and Philetus Church Sr. decided to retired in that same year. Philetus Church died on July 22, 1883. With the loss of the trading post, Church's Landing faded as a settlement. This house is the only structure left marking its location.

== Philetus S. Church house description ==
The Philetus S. Church house is a Greek Revival structure, one of the few in Chippewa County.
