= Chipping Barnet =

Area in the London Borough of Barnet, England

Coordinates: 51.6552°N 0.1997°W

- Town
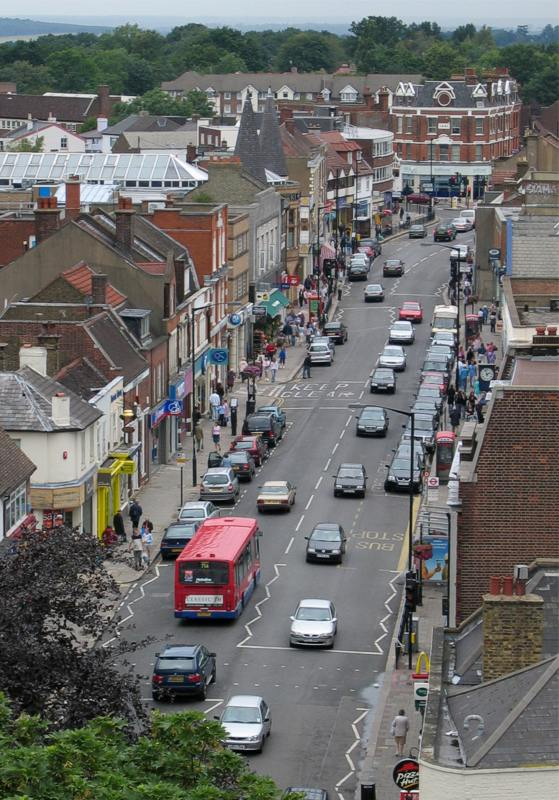
- High Street

- Location within Greater London
- Population: 114,237 (2021 Census)
- OS grid reference: TQ245955
  - Charing Cross: 10.5 mi (16.9 km) SSE
- London borough: Barnet
- Ceremonial county: Greater London
- Region: London
- Country: England
- Sovereign state: United Kingdom
- Post town: BARNET
- Postcode district: EN5
- Dialling code: 020
- Police: Metropolitan
- Fire: London
- Ambulance: London
- UK Parliament: Chipping Barnet Enfield Southgate
- London Assembly: Barnet and Camden

Chipping Barnet or High Barnet is a suburban market town in north London, forming part of the London Borough of Barnet, England. It is a suburban development built around a 12th-century settlement, and is located 10 1/2 miles (17 km) north of Charing Cross, 3 miles (4.8 km) east from Borehamwood, 5.2 miles (8.4 km) west from Enfield and 3.2 miles (5.1 km) south from Potters Bar. Its population was 114,237 in 2021.

Its name is very often abbreviated to just Barnet, which is also the name of the borough of which it forms a part; the town has been part of Greater London since 1965, after the abolition of Barnet Urban District, then in Hertfordshire. Chipping Barnet is also the name of the Parliamentary constituency covering the local area: the word "Chipping" denotes the presence of a market, one that was established here at the end of the 12th century and persists to this day. Chipping Barnet is one of the highest urban settlements in London, with the town centre having an elevation of about 427 feet (130 m).

== History ==
The town's name, recorded as Barneto in about 1070, Barnet in 1197, and La Barnette in 1248, is derived from Old English bærnet: "the land cleared by burning". It refers to the clearing of land in an area that was once densely forested.

In Saxon times the site was part of an extensive wood called Southaw, belonging to the Abbey of St Albans. Barnet's elevated position is indicated in one of its alternative names ("High Barnet"), which appears in many old books and maps, and which the Great Northern Railway company adopted for the railway station opened in 1872 (now High Barnet tube station). The area was historically a common resting point on the traditional Great North Road between the City of London and York and Edinburgh.

The Battle of Barnet in 1471 was fought at nearby Monken Hadley, where Yorkist troops led by King Edward IV killed the rebellious "Kingmaker" Richard Neville, 16th Earl of Warwick, and Warwick's brother, John Neville, 1st Marquess of Montagu. This was one of the most important battles of the Wars of the Roses.

Barnet Fair is a well-known horse fair dating back to 1588, which takes place each September. Queen Elizabeth I granted a charter to the Lord of the Manor of Barnet to hold a twice yearly fair. The fair gives its name to the Cockney rhyming slang of Barnet Fair or barnet for "hair".

The famous Barnet Market is now (2024) nearly 825 years old. On 23 August 1199 King John issued a charter for a market at Barnet to the Lord of the Manor, the Abbot of St. Albans, John de Cella.

A map of Barnet Urban District in 1935

Chipping Barnet was an ancient parish in Hertfordshire. In 1863, a local government district called Barnet was established covering the built-up area as it then was, taking in part of Chipping Barnet parish and parts of the neighbouring Middlesex parishes of South Mimms and Monken Hadley. The Middlesex parts of the district were transferred to Hertfordshire in 1889.

The district was reconstituted as the Barnet Urban District in 1894. As part of the 1894 reforms, the civil parish of Chipping Barnet was reduced to just cover the part of the old parish within the Barnet Urban District. The eastern end of the old Chipping Barnet parish that fell within the neighbouring East Barnet Valley Urban District became a new civil parish called Barnet Vale, and the remainder of the old Chipping Barnet parish outside either urban district became a new parish called Arkley. Barnet Urban District's boundaries were enlarged on a number of occasions, notably absorbing Arkley in 1905 and Totteridge in 1914.

Chipping Barnet (parish) population
1881	4,283
1891	4,563
1901	2,893
1911	3,954
1921	4,154
1931	6,018
1941	7,845
1951	7,062
# No census was held due to war
Source: UK census

In 1801 the parish had a population of 1,258 and covered an area of 1,440 acres (5.8 km^{2}). By 1901 the parish was reduced to 380 acres (1.5 km^{2}) and had a population of 2,893. In 1951 the population was 7,062.

The Barnet Urban District and the civil parishes it contained, including Chipping Barnet, were abolished in 1965, when the area was transferred from Hertfordshire to Greater London and the newly created London Borough of Barnet.

At the beginning of the 21st century, a tongue-in-cheek movement calling for the name Barnet to be changed to "Barnét" began to gain the attention of the public and the national media, with many public road signs in the area regularly being altered to contain the accented character.

=== Religious sites ===
St John the Baptist Church is a landmark for miles around and stands in what was the centre of the town. It was erected by John de la Moote, abbot of St Albans, about 1400, the architect being Beauchamp. Playing on its antiquity, it continues to call itself "Barnet Church", although this is not an official title. It is in fact the parish church of Chipping Barnet only, whilst Christ Church is the parish church of High Barnet, St Mark's is the parish church of Barnet Vale, St James's is the parish church of New Barnet, and Holy Trinity is the parish church of the Lyonsdown district. In addition, St Mary the Virgin is the parish church of East Barnet and St John of Friern Barnet. The parish church of St Mary the Virgin, Monken Hadley (rebuilt 1494) also has parish boundaries that include a significant part of High Barnet, including much of Barnet High Street.

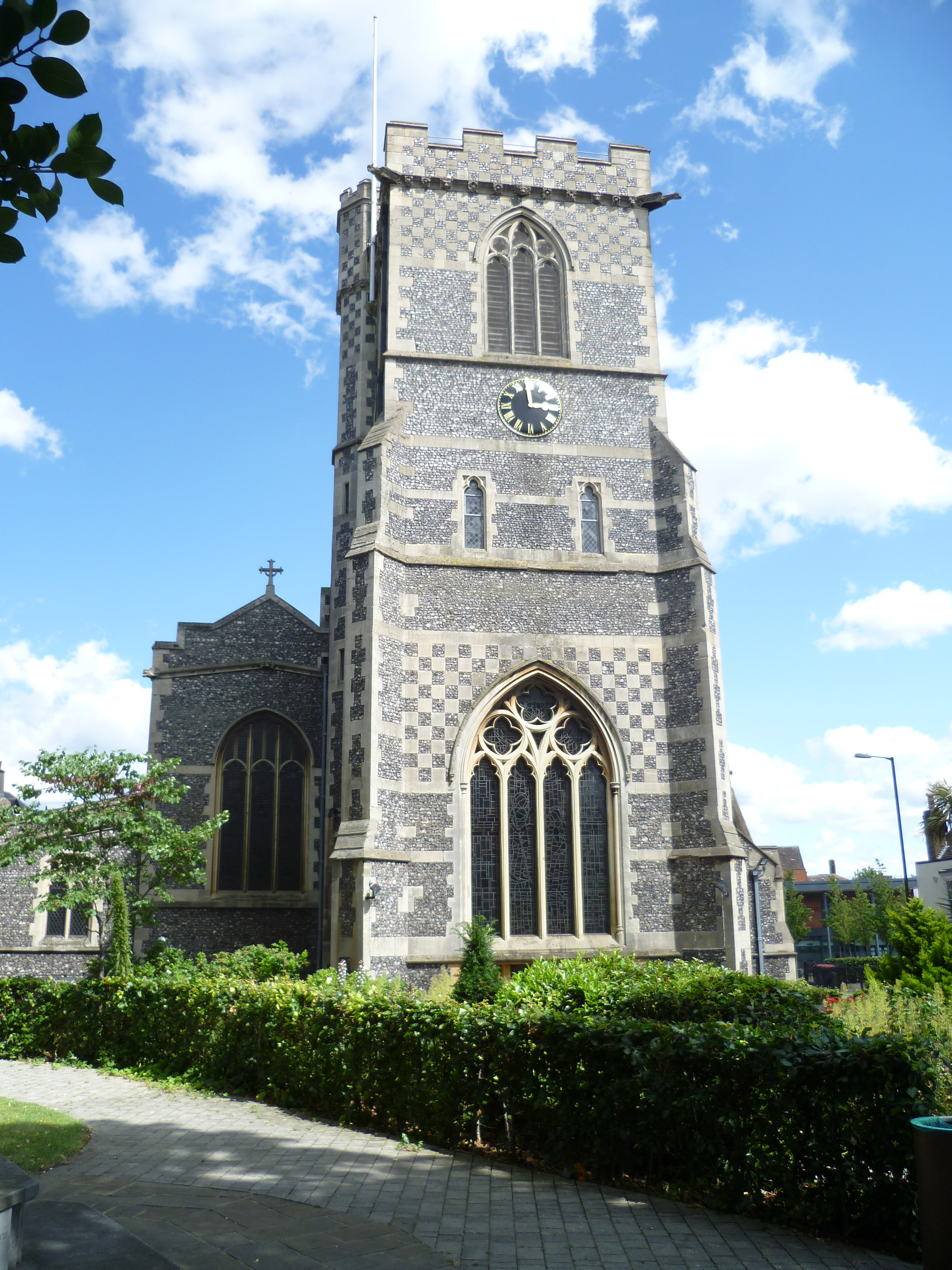
St John the Baptist Church

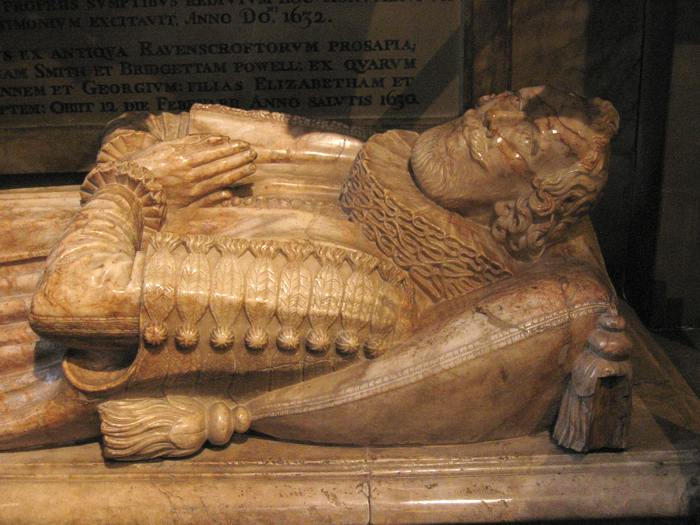
Tomb of Thomas Ravenscroft in Chipping Barnet Church

The living of Barnet is a curacy, held with the rectory of East Barnet till the death of the last incumbent in 1866, when the livings were separated. The parish of Chipping Barnet, served by St John's Church, was provided with a chapel-of-ease in Victorian times; subsequently Chipping Barnet parish was split in two, and the chapel-of-ease (on Bells Hill, Barnet) raised to the status of a parish church, dedicated to St Stephen.

== Geography ==
Chipping Barnet is designated as a Neighbourhood Centre in the London Plan.

The tower of Barnet parish church – St John the Baptist – at the top of Barnet Hill claims to be the highest point between itself and the Ural Mountains 2,000 miles (3,200 km) to the east. However, the same has been said of numerous other points. Since the opening of the railway, development has increased considerably, especially in the west of the area near Arkley.

For a London town, Barnet lies very high; the High Street is 427 feet (130 m) above sea level and the surrounding southern land no less than 295 feet (90 m).

== Demography ==
Chipping Barnet town centre is covered by the High Barnet ward. According to the 2011 census, the population was 82% white (68% White British, 11% Other White, 3% White Irish). Indians made up 4% of the population, and all black groups made up 3%. The whole town is defined as the Chipping Barnet parliamentary constituency, which takes up the eastern third of the wider borough. This data does not represent the town as a whole because it contains six other wards.

== Transport ==
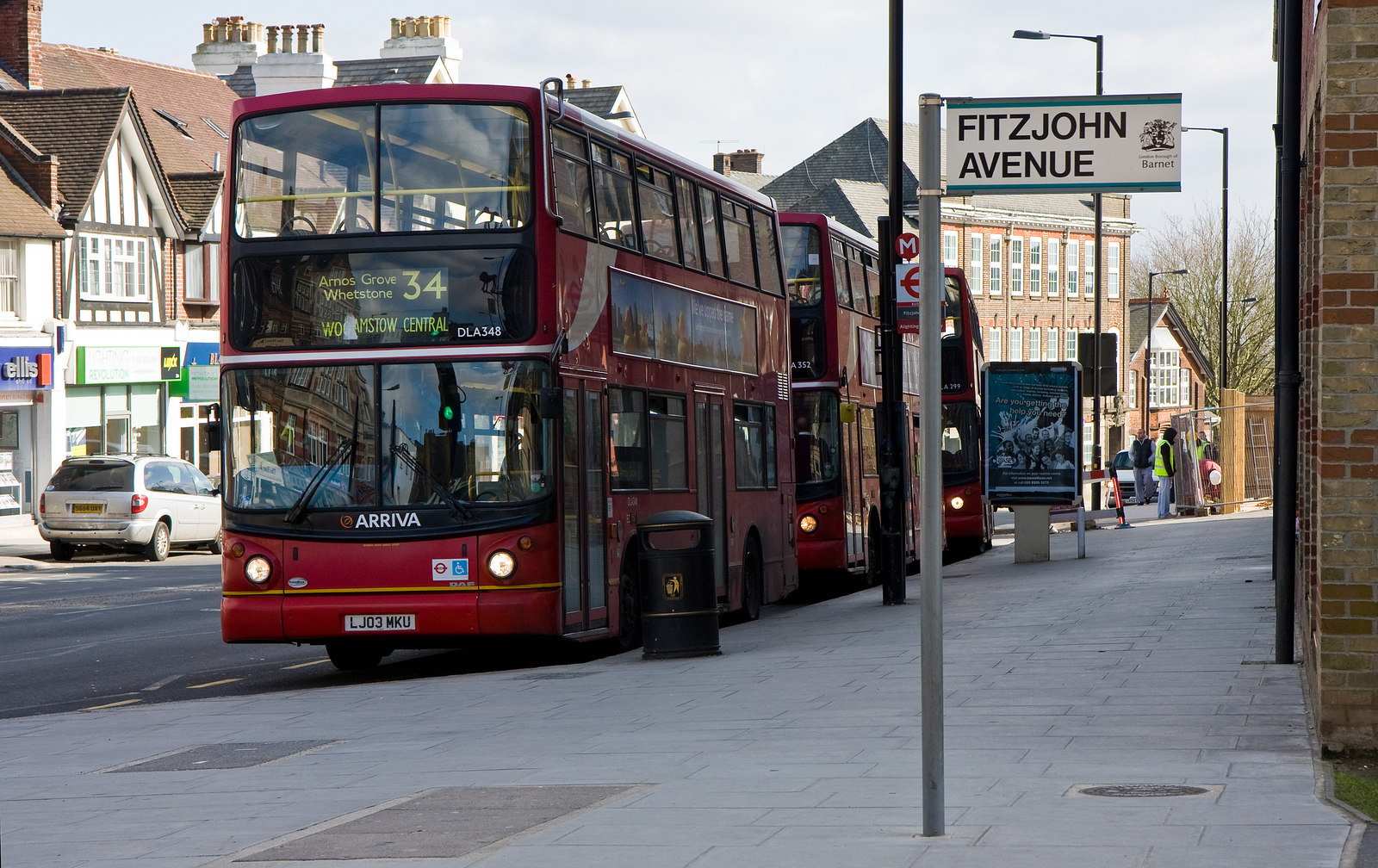
Bus 34 terminus on High Street

Barnet Hill is a major hill on the historic Great North Road. In coaching days, 150 stagecoaches passed through Barnet daily. The modern Great North Road replacement, the A1, runs to the west of the town along Barnet Bypass.

=== Tube and train ===
High Barnet Underground station is on the Northern line while New Barnet railway station is on the East Coast Main Line served by services from King's Cross and Moorgate to Welwyn Garden City. Totteridge and Whetstone Underground station serves the affluent areas bearing the same name southwest of High Barnet town centre. Oakleigh Park railway station serves the eastern extremity of the town. The Barnet Tunnel is also in the area.

== Public services ==
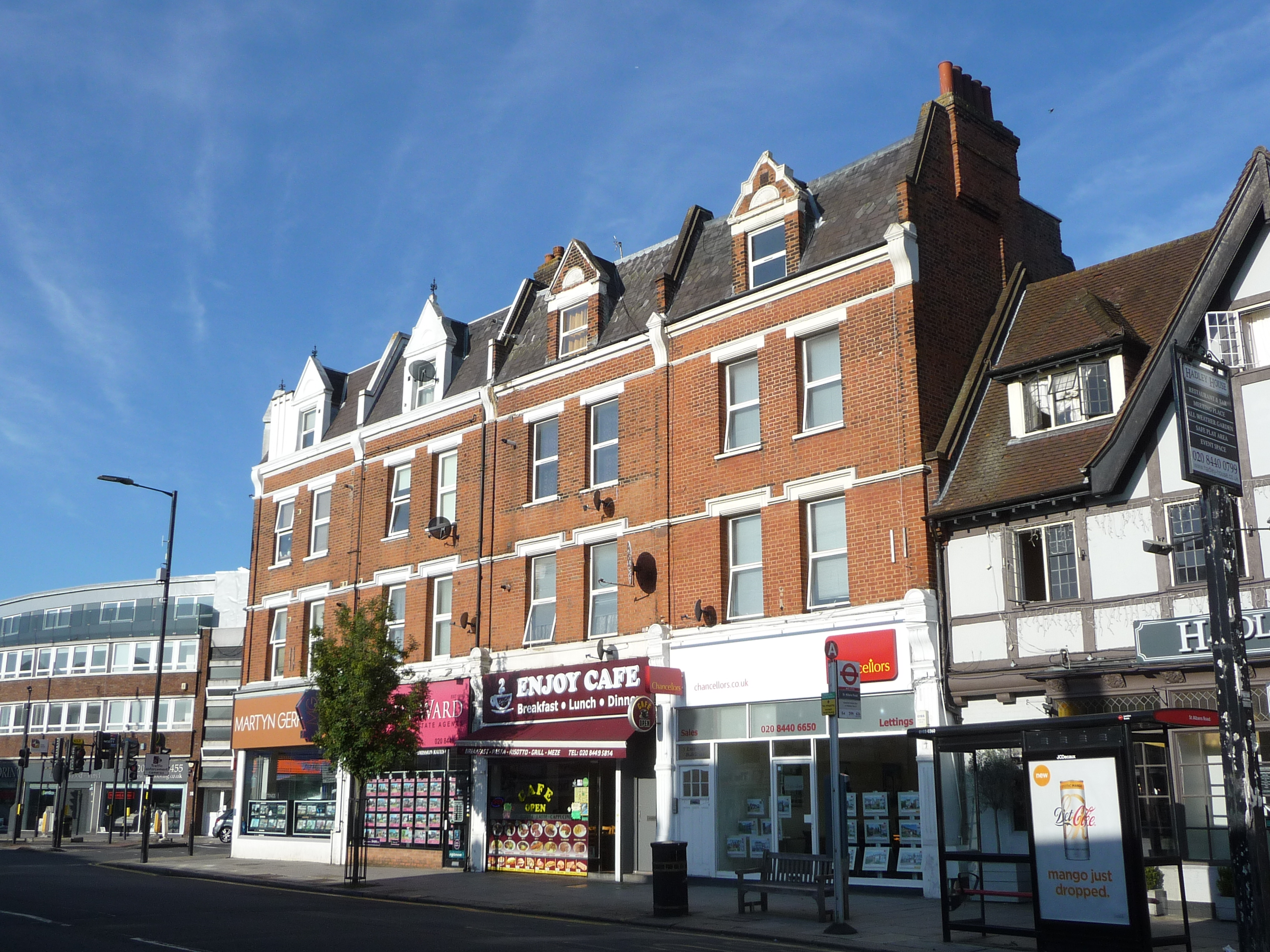
Chipping Barnet High Street

Barnet is served by Barnet Hospital, which is run by the Royal Free London NHS Foundation Trust as part of the English National Health Service. There is also an NHS clinic in Vale Drive (near Barnet Hill and High Barnet station). London Ambulance Service responds to medical emergencies in Barnet. Home Office policing is provided by the Metropolitan Police Service. Statutory emergency fire service is provided by the London Fire Brigade, which has a station on Station Road, built in 1992.

== Wood Street ==
Wood Street in Chipping Barnet contains a number of historic buildings including cottages dating from the 16th, 17th and 18th centuries that are listed buildings, and wallpaper, thought to date from the 1840s, has been discovered in Claire Cottages situated at the junction of Wood Street and Manor Road. Tudor Hall was built in 1573 and a house known as Whalebones or The Whalebones House, that was built in 1815, has a set of whale jaw bones forming its entrance, dating from 1939, which were placed there by building contractor W. Foster & Sons, replacing jaw bones that were there previously. The North London Coroner's Court is based on Wood Street. Also located on a junction on Wood Street is The Blackhorse Pub, one of the oldest pubs in Barnet, which dates from the 1720s. Barnet and Southgate College has a campus on Wood Street, and Barnet Museum is also located on Wood Street.

== Sport and recreation ==
Barnet FC is the local football team, currently in the EFL League Two, the fourth tier of English football – at the end of the 2017/18 season Barnet were relegated from League Two, and have remained in the Vanarama National League until the 2025/26 season when they were promoted to League 2 by winning the Vanarama National League. They played at the Underhill Stadium until 2012/13 but from the 2013/14 season are playing at The Hive Stadium in Stanmore in the London Borough of Harrow. They first reached the Football League in 1991 as champions of the GM Vauxhall Conference but lost their status 10 years later with relegation, only to return four years later – again as Conference champions. London Lions F.C. is also based in Barnet, near Stirling Corner, but the 1st team plays midweek and some cup home games at Hemel Hempstead Town F.C. as its own ground is not floodlit and does not meet the requirements for some cup competitions. There are a number of amateur football clubs based in Barnet including East Barnet Old Grammarians and Ravenscroft Old Boys.

Barnet Cricket Club and Old Elizabethans' Cricket Club have merged to form one club in Barnet and currently play their games at Gypsy Corner. Shaftesbury Barnet Harriers is a local athletics club. Barnet and Old Elizabethans rugby clubs merged to form Barnet Elizabethans RFC, playing in Byng Road, Barnet, near Queen Elizabeth's School. Chipping Barnet has a King George's Field in memorial to King George V. Old Court House Recreation Ground is a park in High Barnet.

High Barnet has an Everyman cinema, the Barnet Museum, the All Saints Art Centre, the Ravenscroft local park and Barnet recreational park, a now disused well that was frequented by, among others, Samuel Pepys, and many restaurants and public houses. Local festivals include the traditional annual Barnet Fair, which was chartered in medieval times, the High Barnet Chamber Music Festival, and Barnet Medieval Festival.

== Local papers ==
The principal local newspapers are The Barnet and Potters Bar Times and The Barnet Post, which was established in July 2021.

The Barnet Press operated until 2017.

The Barnet Society also frequently publishes articles on local news as well as a quarterly newsletter.

== Notable people ==
- Peter Banks (1947–2013), rock guitarist (Yes), was born in the town.
- Stephanie Beacham (born 1947) actress, businesswoman and former model, was born in the town.
- Geoffrey Chater (1921–2021), character actor, was born in the town.
- Lenny Cooper (born 1981), English cricketer
- Nadine Coyle (born 1985), singer, grew up in the town.
- Paul Freeman (born 1943), actor, was born in the town.
- Martin Furnival Jones (1912-1997) former Director General of MI5 was born here.
- Ravi Haria (born 1999), chess grandmaster
- Stuart Holden (born 1955), darts player, was born in the town.
- Mark Kermode (born 1963), film critic and musician, was born in the town.
- Nicko McBrain (born 1952), drummer, grew up in the town.
- Elaine Paige (born 1948), theatre actress and singer, radio host, was born in the town.
- Mike Skinner (born 1979), rapper, singer-songwriter, musician, and record producer, was born in the town.
- Lee Thompson (born 1957), saxophonist (Madness), is from the town.
- Helen Wallis (1924–1995), librarian and historian, was born in the town.

== See also ==
- List of people from Barnet
- List of schools in Barnet
- Church View and Church Cottages
- Church House, Barnet
- 53 Wood Street, a grade II listed house
