= Zalmon Church House =

- U.S. National Register of Historic Places
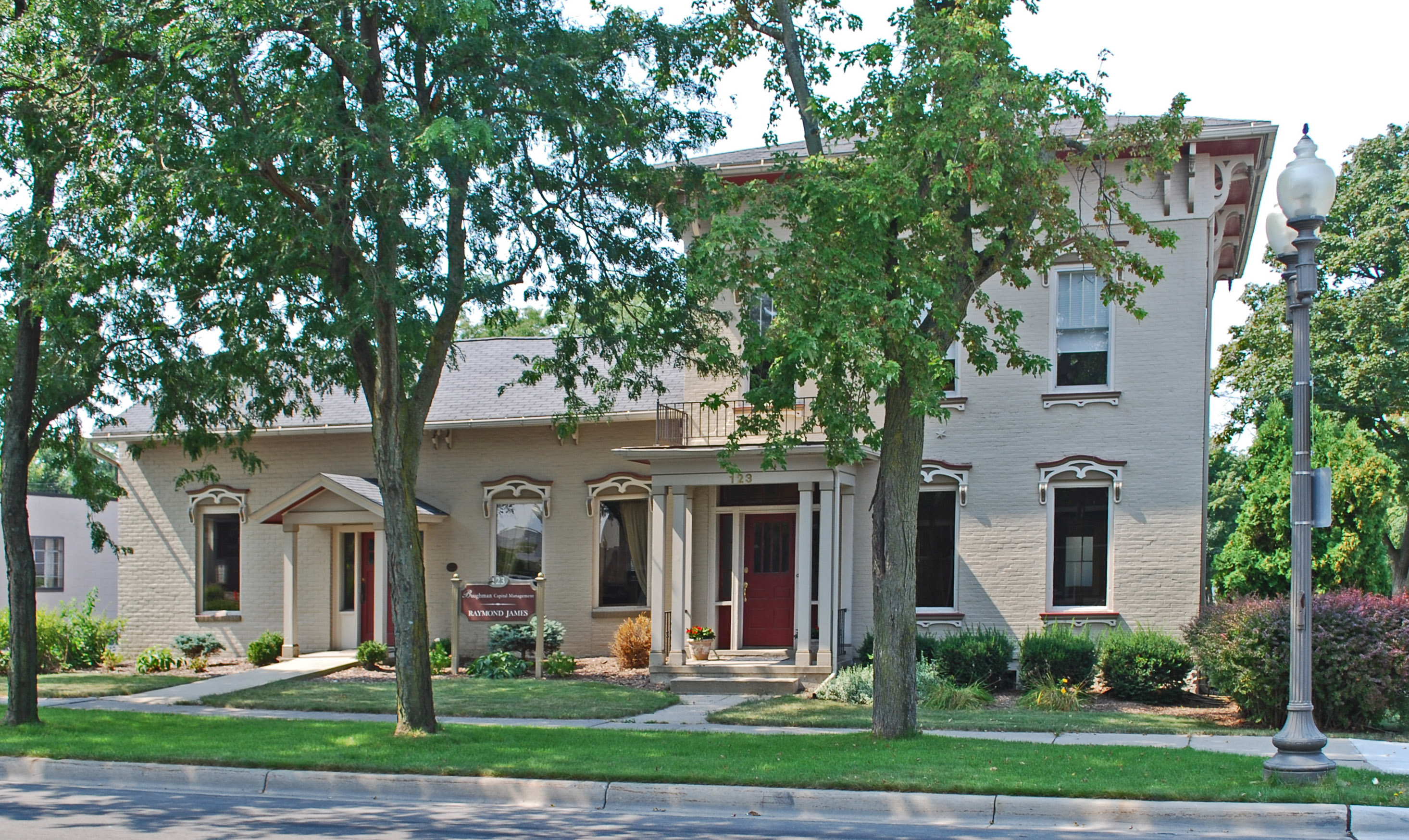
- Interactive map
- Location: 113 N. Ann Arbor, Saline, Michigan
- Coordinates: 42°10′02″N 83°46′55″W
- Area: less than one acre
- Built: 1860
- Architectural style: Italianate
- MPS: Saline MRA
- NRHP reference No.: 85002966
- Added to NRHP: October 10, 1985

The Zalmon Church House is a single-family home located at 113 North Ann Arbor in Saline, Michigan. It was listed on the National Register of Historic Places in 1985.

== History ==
Zalmon Church served in a number of positions in the village of Saline, including Street Commissioner. He had this house constructed in about 1860. After Church's death in 1880, the house passed to his daughter, Mary Church Eaton. Eaton was the wife of prominent lawyer Peter M. Eaton, although it is unknown whether he ever occupied the house.

== Description ==
The Zalmon Church House is a two-story painted brick Italianate structure. It has a hipped roof with a single-story gabled wing. It has paired eaves brackets and segmental-arched lintels which are typical Italianate details. A front porch and small side porch are of more recent construction, but complement the architecture.
