= Barnet Market =

Market in High Barnet, London, England

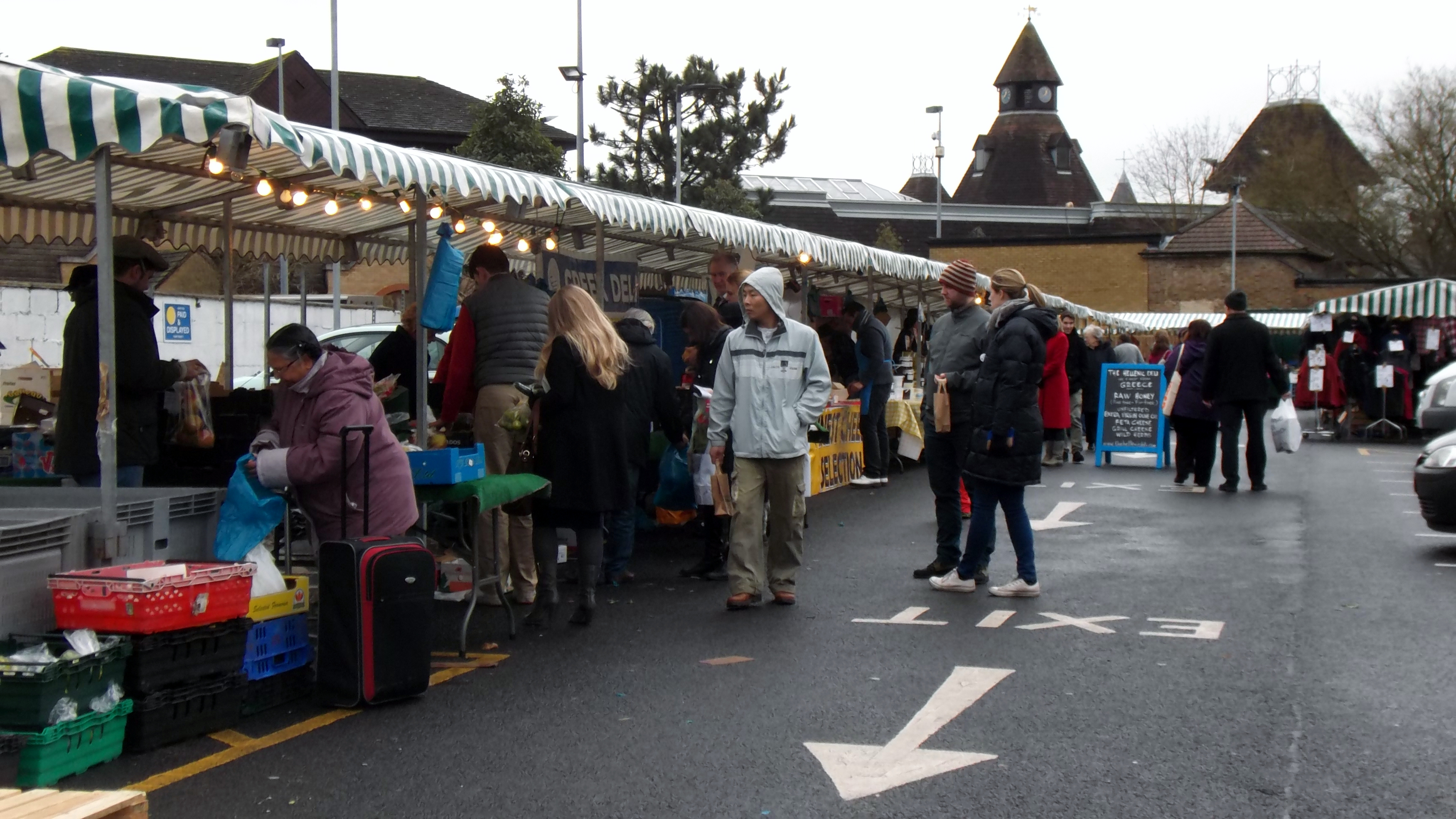
- Location: Chipping Close; High Barnet, Barnet, Greater London; 51.6563°N 0.2029°W
- Opening date: 1199 (charter)
- Management: Barnet Market Ltd
- Owner: Aberdeen City Council
- Environment: Outdoor
- Goods sold: General goods
- Days normally open: Wednesday, Saturday
- Number of tenants: 50
- Website: www.barnet-market.co.uk
- Interactive map of Barnet Market

Barnet Market is a weekly market held in High Barnet, in the London Borough of Barnet, Greater London.

== History ==
It first established on 23 August 1199 when King John issued a Charter for a Market at Barnet to the Lord of the Manor, the Abbot of St. Albans, John de Cella. This charter is one of the oldest recorded for a market. On 6 February 1588 a new Barnet Market Charter was issued by Queen Elizabeth I to the then Lord of the Manor, Charles Butler, which also allowed the holding of the Barnet Horse Fair.

The town of High Barnet is sometimes known as Chipping Barnet, in reference to the market.

In January 2008 Barnet Market moved to a temporary site on Stapylton Road car park to enable the St. Albans Road scheme with the New Market to be built, but the scheme did not progress and it moved back in 2010 even though the site has been cleared.

On 8 April 2019 the site at Chipping Close was bought by Aberdeen City Council for £4,000,000.

== The market ==
It has 50 stalls and is open Wednesday and Saturday.
