= Barking Market =

Market in Barking, London, England

Barking Town Centre Market
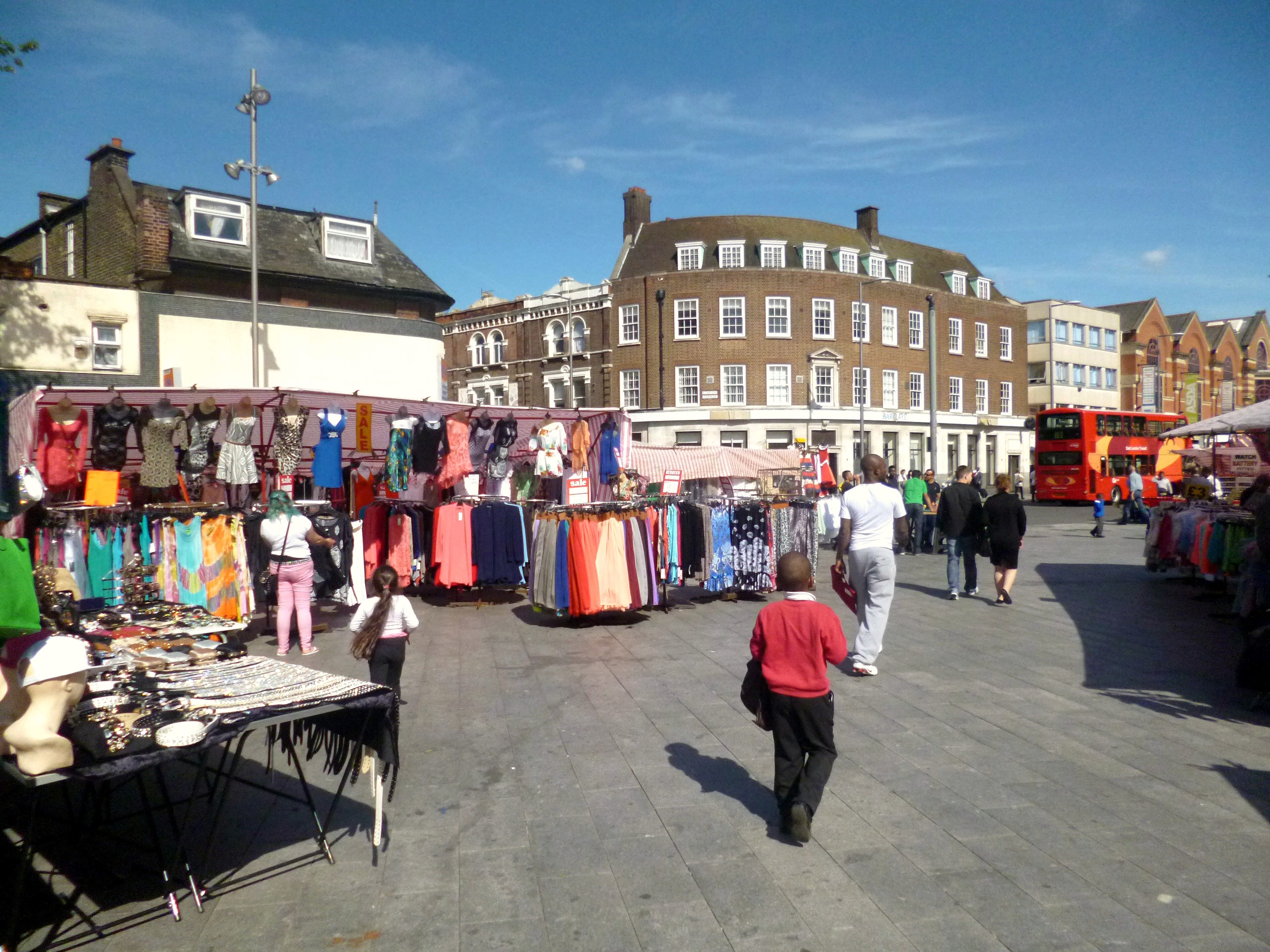
- Location: East Street; Barking, Barking and Dagenham, Greater London; 51.537°N 0.0785°E
- Opening date: Chartered 1175, revived 1991
- Management: Barking and Dagenham London Borough Council
- Owner: Barking and Dagenham London Borough Council
- Environment: Outdoor
- Days normally open: Monday, Tuesday, Thursday, Friday, Saturday
- Number of tenants: 180
- Website: www.lbbd.gov.uk
- Interactive map of Barking Market

Barking Market (also called Barking Town Centre Market) is a market located in Barking in the London Borough of Barking and Dagenham in East London, England. It operates on Monday, Tuesday, Thursday, Friday and Saturday.

Barking has an ancient market right issued between 1175 and 1179. The market declined in the 18th century and has since been revived. The current market dates from 1991 and was expanded in 2001.

It is located on East Street, Barking and is operated by Barking and Dagenham Council.

It is not to be confused with Dagenham Sunday Market, which takes its name from Dagenham where it used to be located in Chequers Lane, but which relocated to Barking, near Creekmouth, in 2002. It closed in 2020
