= List of public art in the London Borough of Havering =

This is a list of public art in the London Borough of Havering.

== Coldharbour ==
Image	Title / subject	Location and coordinates	Date	Artist / designer	Type	Designation	Notes
	The Diver:Regeneration	Coldharbour 51.4974°N 0.1824°E	2000	John Kaufman	Statue	—	

== Harold Hill ==
Image	Title / subject	Location and coordinates	Date	Artist / designer	Type	Designation	Notes
	Harold Hill War Memorial	Hilldene Avenue, Harold Hill 51.6071°N 0.2180°E	1998	Hammond and Partners	Memorial stone	—	
	The Art of Recycling	Outside Harold Hill Library, Hilldene Avenue, Harold Hill 51.6076°N 0.2184°E	2003	Mark Wydler, Karen Wydler and Carrie Reichardt	Mural	—	
	Sustrans Portrait Bench	Central Park, Harold Hill 51.6071°N 0.2286°E	2011	?	Sculpture	—	Depicts Henry VIII, Dick Bouchard (founder of the Romford Drum & Trumpet Corps), and Harry Eccleston.

== Hornchurch ==
Image	Title / subject	Location and coordinates	Date	Artist / designer	Type	Designation	Notes
	Bull's head	St Andrew's Church 51.5604°N 0.2264°E	c. 1824		Architectural sculpture		
	Hornchurch War Memorial	Upminster Road, near St Andrew's Church 51.5608°N 0.2255°E	1921	Charles A. Nicholson	Memorial cross	—	

== Rainham ==
Image	Title / subject	Location and coordinates	Date	Artist / designer	Type	Material	Designation	Notes
More images	Rainham War Memorial	Rainham town centre 51.518611°N 0.190278°E	1920	Mr Vinton (builder)	Clock tower		Grade II	
	Litmus Towers	A13, Marsh Way and Ferry Lane junctions	2005	Jason Bruges Studio	Sculpture	Galvanised Steel & Aluminium		Four towers. Each displays different data via LEDs.
	Railing Hall	Viking Way Passage	2010	Mark Pimlott	Installation			
	Wildspace Warehouse	Ferry Lane North	2011	Alison Brooks	Cladding			Industrial warehouses alongside the High Speed 1 tracks.
	Rainham Tokens	Bridge Road, Broadway & Upminster Road South	2012	Elaine Tribley, Amanda Westbury	Medallions	Bronze		Twelve tokens set into the pavement.
	Mural	Viking Way Passage	2012	Painter: Peter O'Connor, Design: Objectif (Marta dos Santos, Gaetan Billault)	Mural	Paint		
	Cardinal Seat	Rainham town centre	2013	Mark Pimlott	Bench			
	Orchard Fruit	Orchard Village Community Square	2015	Andrew McKeown	Sculpture	Bronze		Seven separate pieces of varying dimensions.
	Flightway	Ingrebourne Hill, near Lake Stillwell			Sculpture			

== Romford ==
Image	Title / subject	Location and coordinates	Date	Artist / designer	Type	Designation	Notes
More images	Romford War Memorial	Coronation Gardens (originally in Laurie Square; moved here in 1969) 51.5814°N 0.1852°E	1921	J. W. Hammond	Memorial cross	Grade II	

== Upminster ==
Image	Title / subject	Location and coordinates	Date	Artist / designer	Type	Designation	Notes
More images	Upminster War Memorial	St Laurence's Church, Corbets Tey Road 51.5557°N 0.2487°E	1921	C. Harrup	Memorial cross	Grade II	
