= Desmond Uniacke =

British flying ace (1895–1933)

Desmond Percival Fitzgerald Uniacke
- Born: 18 December 1895; Chelsea, Middlesex, England
- Died: 25 March 1933 (aged 37); Middlesex, England
- Military career
- Allegiance: United Kingdom
- Branch: British Army; Royal Air Force
- Service years: 1914–1919
- Rank: Lieutenant
- Units: Royal Inniskilling Fusiliers; Royal Irish Rifles; No. 48 Squadron RFC
- Conflicts: World War I • Western Front
- Other work: Wine salesman

Lieutenant Desmond Percival Fitzgerald Uniacke (18 December 1895 – 25 March 1933) was a British World War I flying ace credited with thirteen aerial victories. He was captured after engaging in aerial combat with Hermann Göring, commander of Jasta 27.

== Background ==
Desmond Percival Fitzgerald Uniacke, second son of Richard Gordon Fitzgerald Uniacke and his wife Cecilia Monica Lambert, was born on 18 December 1895 at 16 Tite Street in Chelsea, Middlesex, England. He was baptized at Saint Barnabas' Church in Pimlico, Middlesex on 16 January 1896. Desmond was one of five children, only three of whom survived to adulthood. He was educated at Saint John's College in Hurstpierpoint, West Sussex, England. His father Richard Uniacke (1867–1934) was a librarian, archivist and genealogist. He served as assistant librarian of printed books at the College of Arms.

== Military career ==
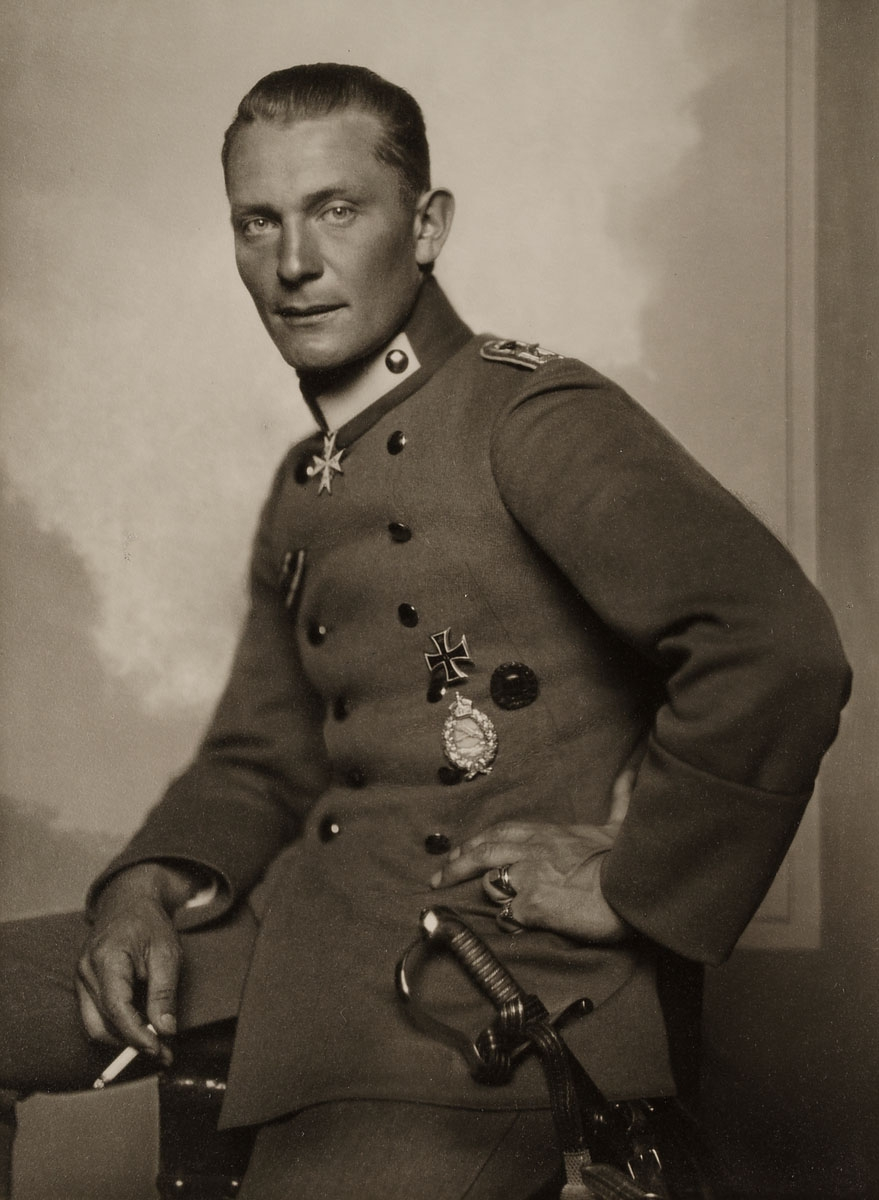
Hermann Göring shot down Desmond Uniacke and Ralph Curtis.

Uniacke was commissioned as a temporary second lieutenant on 23 December 1914, and served in the Royal Inniskilling Fusiliers and the Royal Irish Rifles, before being seconded to the Royal Flying Corps, being appointed a flying officer (observer) on 15 August 1917, with seniority from 17 May.

He was posted to the No. 48 Squadron, where he was credited with thirteen aerial victories. All of them occurred while he was an observer in the Bristol F.2b, also known as a Bristol Fighter. In addition, all thirteen were in conjunction with one pilot, Second Lieutenant Ralph Luxmore Curtis.

Uniacke scored his first aerial victory from his Bristol F2.b with serial number A7149. He and Curtis sent a two-seater out of control over Quéant, Pas-de-Calais, France, on 3 July 1917. Two days later, from Bristol F.2b (A7153), Uniacke and Curtis sent an Albatros D.V out of control over Bapaume, Pas-de-Calais. Uniacke scored his third aerial triumph from his Bristol F.2b (A7107) when he and Curtis destroyed an Albatros D.V over Vitry, France, on 7 July 1917.

Later that month, on 28 July 1917, Uniacke and Curtis in Bristol F.2b (A7121) sent an Albatros D.III out of control over Ghistelles. They achieved a double victory (fifth and sixth for Uniacke) on 16 August 1917 from their Bristol F2.b (A7151). During aerial combat with two Albatros D.V aircraft, one was destroyed in flames and the other sent out of control, both over St. Pierre and Capelle, Nord, France.

The next four victories (7 through 10) for Uniacke were all from Bristol F.2b (A7224). On 20 August 1917, Uniacke scored his seventh aerial victory when he and Curtis sent an Albatros D.V out of control over Ghistelles. Only two days later, Uniacke had a double victory when he and Curtis, destroyed one Albatros D.V and sent another out of control, over Ostend, West Flanders, Belgium. His tenth kill occurred on 2 September 1917, when he and Curtis sent an Albatros D.V out of control east of Diksmuide, West Flanders, Belgium. That victory was shared with the crew of Bristol F.2b (A7170), pilot Lieutenant Keith Rodney Park of New Zealand and observer Second Lieutenant Alan Douglas Light of England, both of them also flying aces.

On 5 September 1917, Uniacke and Curtis, from their Bristol F.2b (A7170), sent a DFW C out of control over Middelkerke, West Flanders. Uniacke had his twelfth aerial triumph on 14 September 1917 from his Bristol F.2b (A7224) when, with Curtis as pilot, he defeated an Albatros D.V, destroying it over Ghistelles. His final victory took place on 17 September 1917 when, with Curtis in their Bristol F.2b (A7224), he sent a two-seater out of control over Leke, West Flanders. That was shared with the crew of Bristol F.2b (A7222), Sergeant J. Oldham as pilot and Second Air Mechanic William Walker, also an ace, as observer.

On 21 September 1917, Uniacke and Curtis engaged in aerial combat with pilot Hermann Göring, commander of Jasta 27. The confrontation took place over Sleyhage, near Roeselare, West Flanders, also known as Roulers. At 0905, their Bristol F.2b was shot down by Göring. Curtis died later that day from the wounds he had sustained in combat. Uniacke was captured and became a prisoner of war. He was eventually repatriated in January 1919, and relinquished his commission on ceasing to be employed on 12 May 1919.

== After the war ==
Uniacke married Beatrice Mary Swetenham Johnstone (1901–1975), daughter of Arthur Oliver Johnstone, in 1920 in Sussex, England. Prior to his death, he resided at 7 Normand Mansions on Normand Road in West Kensington, London. His occupation was that of wine salesman. He died on 25 March 1933 in Middlesex, England. His former wife had remarried prior to his death. Her name at the time of probate on 2 June 1933 was Beatrice Mary Swetenham Hicks-Beach. She had married William Guy Hicks-Beach in 1932.

== Gallery of aeroplanes ==
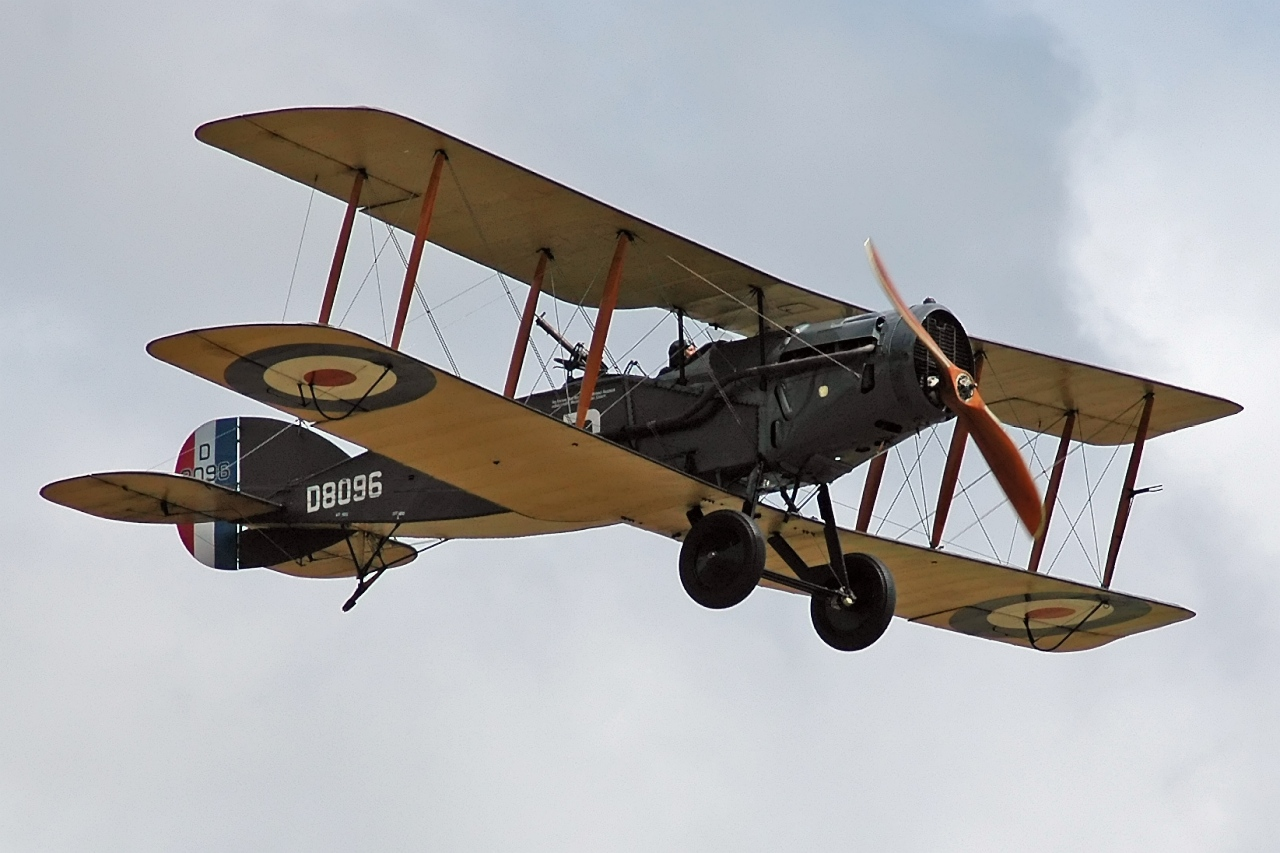
He scored all of his victories from the Bristol F.2b

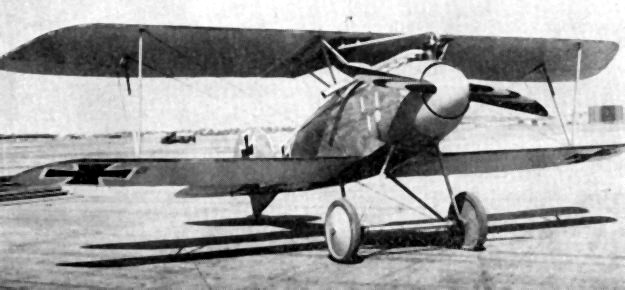
He scored one of his victories against an Albatros D.III, #4

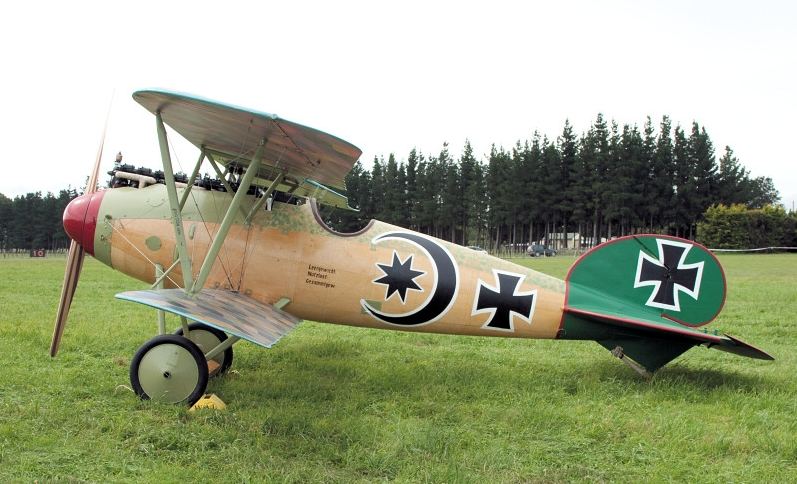
He scored nine of his victories against the Albatros D.V
