= Ralph Curtis =

British World War I flying ace (1898–1917)

Ralph Luxmore Curtis
- Born: 19 March 1898; Rainham, Essex, England
- Died: 21 September 1917 (aged 19); West Flanders, Belgium
- Burial place: Harlebeke New British Cemetery, Harelbeke, West Flanders, Belgium; 50°51′33″N 3°19′27″E
- Military career
- Allegiance: United Kingdom
- Branch: British Army
- Rank: Second Lieutenant
- Unit: No. 48 Squadron Royal Flying Corps

Second Lieutenant Ralph Luxmore Curtis (19 March 1898 – 21 September 1917) was a World War I British flying ace credited with fifteen aerial victories. He died from wounds sustained when he engaged in aerial combat with Hermann Göring, commander of Jasta 27. The aviator was interred twice in Belgian cemeteries, and was also commemorated on the Rainham War Memorial.

== Background ==
Ralph Luxmore Curtis, son of William Curtis and his wife Amy Augusta (May) Curtis, was born on 19 March 1898 in Rainham, Essex, England. His father was a farmer, and the family lived at Berwick Pond/Berwick Manor in Rainham. Curtis attended Chigwell School in Essex.

== Military career ==
Ralph Curtis received his aviator's certificate on 17 February 1917 at the London and Provincial School in Hendon, Greater London, England. However, he did so by falsifying his date of birth, claiming to have been born on 19 March 1896 and, therefore, two years older than his actual age of eighteen. He served with No. 48 Squadron of the Royal Flying Corps as a second lieutenant.

Ralph Luxmore Curtis is credited with fifteen aerial victories. All of them occurred while he piloted a Bristol F.2b (also known as a Bristol Fighter). In addition, most of them (thirteen) were in conjunction with one observer, Second Lieutenant Desmond Percival Fitzgerald Uniacke. Curtis experienced his first aerial triumph on 16 June 1917, with Second Lieutenant Laurence W. Allen as observer. It was the tenth and final victory for Allen. They destroyed an Albatros D.III from Bristol F.2b with serial number A7107.

Curtis scored his second aerial victory from his Bristol F.2b (A7149). He and his observer Uniacke sent a two-seater out of control over Quéant, Pas-de-Calais, France on 3 Jul 1917. Two days later, from Bristol F.2b (A7153), Curtis and Uniacke sent an Albatros D.V out of control over Bapaume, Pas-de-Calais. Curtis scored his fourth aerial victory from his Bristol F.2b (A7107) when he and his observer Uniacke destroyed an Albatros D.V over Vitry, France on 7 July 1917. That same month, on 28 July 1917, the team of Curtis and Uniacke in Bristol F.2b (A7121) sent an Albatros D.III out of control over Ghistelles. Second Lieutenants Curtis and Uniacke scored a double victory (sixth and seventh for Curtis) on 16 August 1917 from their Bristol F.2b (A7151). During aerial combat with two Albatros D.V aircraft, one was destroyed in flames and the other sent out of control, both over St. Pierre and Capelle, Nord, France.

The next four victories (8 through 11) for Curtis were all from Bristol F.2b (A7224). On 20 August 1917, Curtis scored his eighth aerial victory when he and observer Uniacke sent an Albatros D.V out of control over Ghistelles. Two days later, Curtis had a double victory when he, with Uniacke as observer, destroyed one Albatros D.V and sent another out of control, both over Ostend, West Flanders, Belgium. His eleventh kill occurred on 2 September 1917, when he and observer Uniacke sent an Albatros D.V out of control east of Diksmuide, West Flanders, Belgium. It was shared with the crew of Bristol F.2b (A7170), pilot Lieutenant Keith Rodney Park from New Zealand and observer Second Lieutenant Alan Douglas Light from England, both flying aces as well.

On 5 September 1917, it appears that Curtis had two victories, with two different observers. One was with his usual teammate Uniacke, from Bristol F.2b (A7170). They sent a DFW C out of control over Middelkerke, West Flanders. For the other, Curtis paired with observer Second Lieutenant H Munro later that day. They shot an Albatros D.V down in flames off Westende, West Flanders. Their victim is believed by some to have been Leutnant Franz Pernet of Jasta Boelcke. Pernet was the stepson of General Erich Ludendorff. Curtis had his fourteenth aerial victory on 14 September 1917 when his Bristol F.2b (A7224), with Uniacke as observer, defeated an Albatros D.V, destroying it over Ghistelles. His final triumph took place on 17 Sep 1917 when, with Uniacke in their Bristol F.2b (A7224), he sent a two-seater out of control over Leke, West Flanders. It was shared with the crew of Bristol F.2b (A7222), pilot Sergeant J Oldham and observer Second Air Mechanic William Walker.

== Death ==
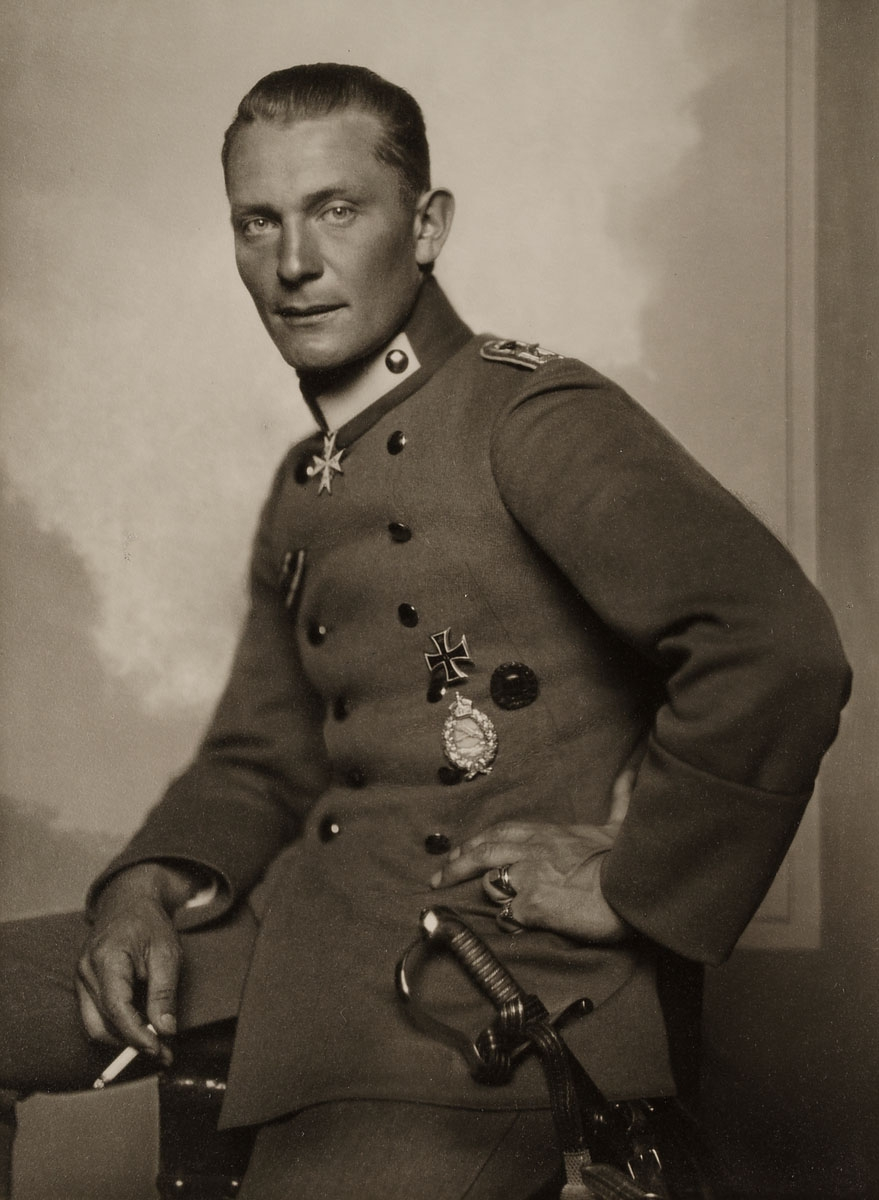
Hermann Göring shot down aces Ralph Curtis and Desmond Uniacke.

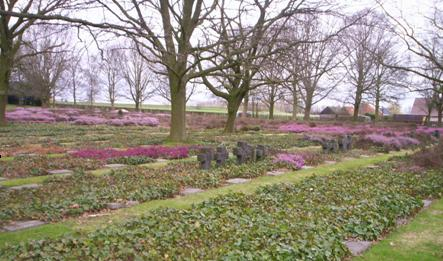
Hooglede German Military Cemetery

On 21 September 1917, pilot Second Lieutenant Ralph Curtis and his observer Second Lieutenant Desmond Uniacke engaged in aerial combat with pilot Hermann Göring, commander of Jasta 27, over Sleyhage, near Roeselare, West Flanders, also known as Roulers. Curtis was piloting Bristol F.2b (A7224). At 09:05, their Bristol Fighter was shot down by Göring. Uniacke was captured and became a prisoner of war, and Curtis died that day in a German dressing station from the wounds that he had sustained in the combat. Curtis was initially interred at Hooglede Ost German Military Cemetery in Hooglede, West Flanders. In 1924, his remains were transferred to Harlebeke New British Cemetery in Harelbeke, West Flanders, Belgium. He is also represented on the Rainham War Memorial, a clock tower monument in the center of the town of Rainham, which commemorates the fallen of World War I.

== Gallery of planes ==
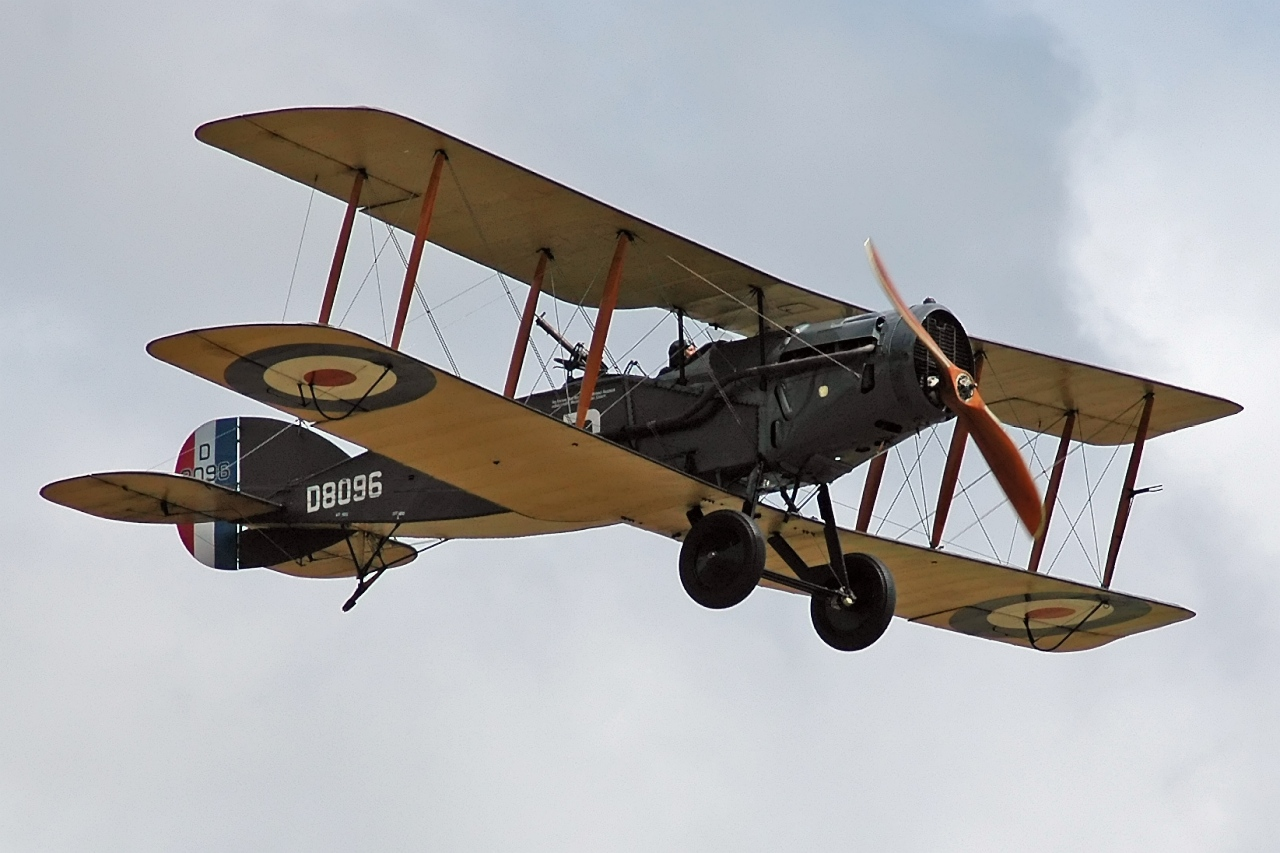
Ralph Luxmore Curtis scored all of his victories from the Bristol F.2b.

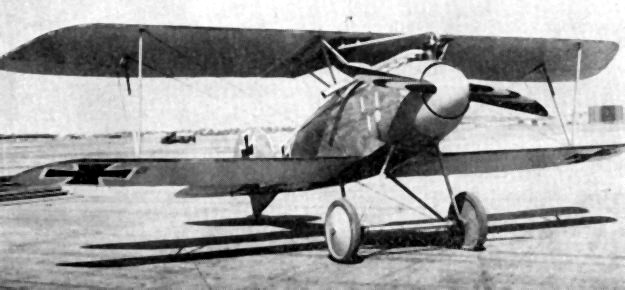
He scored two of his victories against the Albatros D.III, #1 and #5.

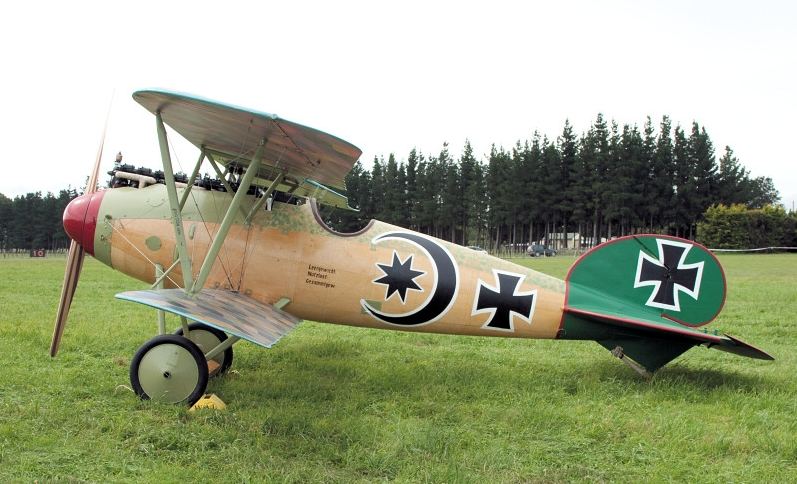
Curtis scored the majority of his victories against the Albatros D.V.
