= Richard Uniacke =

Richard Uniacke may refer to:

- Richard John Uniacke (1753–1830), abolitionist, lawyer, politician, member of the Nova Scotia House of Assembly and Attorney General of Nova Scotia
- Richard John Uniacke Jr. (1789–1834), lawyer, judge and political figure in Nova Scotia
- Richard G. F. Uniacke (1867–1934), British genealogist and librarian
