= Romford Cemetery =

Cemetery in Romford, London

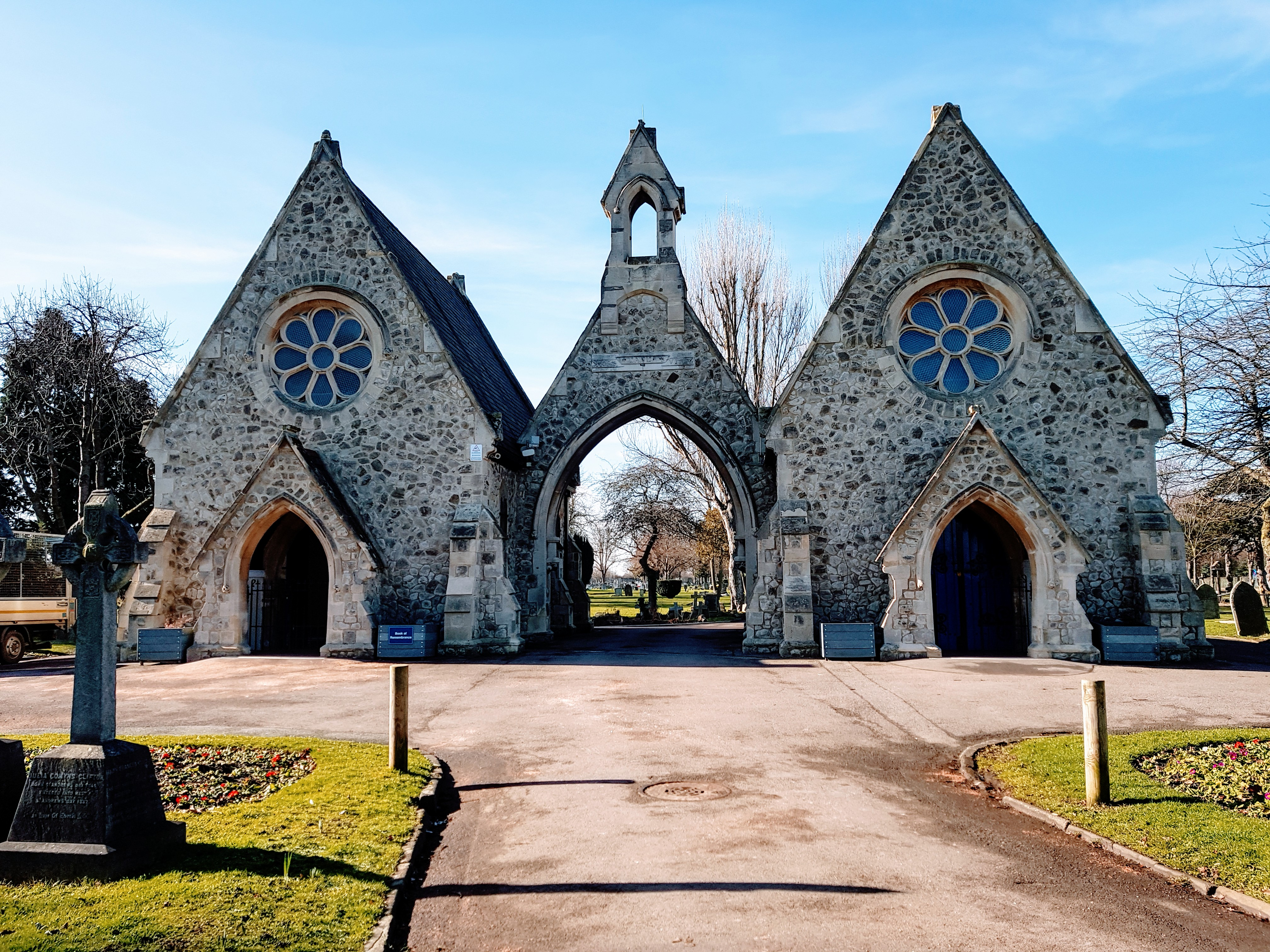
- Romford Cemetery entrance archway
- Interactive map of Romford Cemetery

Details
- Established: 27 October 1871; 154 years ago
- Location: London
- Country: England
- Coordinates: 51°34′05″N 0°10′12″E
- Owned by: Havering London Borough Council
- Size: 8.1 hectares (20 acres)

Romford Cemetery is a cemetery in the southwest of the town of Romford in London, United Kingdom. It is owned by Havering London Borough Council.

== History ==
Romford Burial Board was established in 1869 to provide a new cemetery to replace the existing one that had become full.

Land was purchased in 1870 and Crow Lane Cemetery was opened for burials on 27 October 1871.

It had previously formed part Nuthatches Farm. 8.5 acres (3.4 ha) were initially purchased, of which only about 5.5 acres (2.2 ha) were laid out as cemetery. Part of the cemetery was consecrated by the Bishop of Rochester on 24 October 1871.

== Graves ==
- John Basil Poel

The cemetery contains the war graves of 118 identified Commonwealth service personnel of the First and Second World Wars.
