= Rainham War Memorial =

War memorial in London

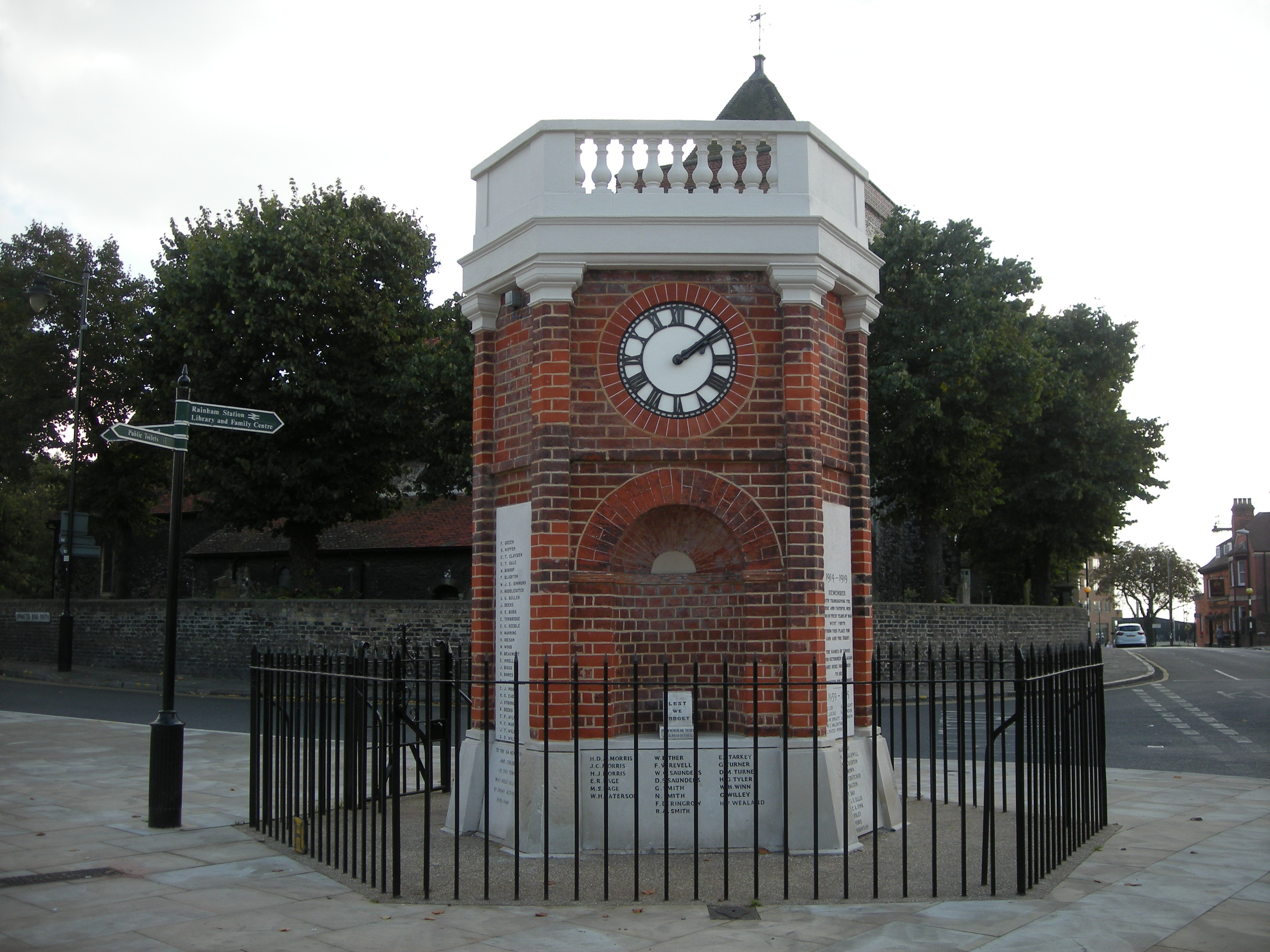
- Rainham War Memorial, a clock tower which commemorates soldiers killed in World War I.
- Interactive map of Rainham War Memorial

Details
- Established: 1920
- Location: Broadway and Upminster Road, Rainham, London
- Country: England
- Coordinates: 51°31′07″N 0°11′25″E
- Type: military

The Rainham War Memorial commemorates soldiers killed in both World Wars as well as civilian casualties of World War II.

== Monument ==
The monument is a clock tower in the centre of the town of Rainham, London, England. It is constructed of red Belgian brick, with Portland stone dressings. Portland stone is a limestone quarried on the Isle of Portland, Dorset, England. There is cast stone ornamentation as well. The memorial is a hexagonal short tower with clock faces on three of its sides. On a sloping base, the names of the war dead are inscribed. In addition, stone blocks inscribed with "Lest We Forget" are positioned at angles to the tower. There are also inscription panels on the sides of the monument. Narrow pilasters decorate the angles of the clock tower. Arches are present over a niche and doorway. The top of the clock tower features a parapet with balustrade. Iron railings surround the memorial, which is prominently sited between Broadway and Upminster Road in front of Saint Helen and Saint Giles, the parish church of Rainham.

The Rainham War Memorial was built in 1920 by a Mr. Vinton. It was unveiled by Colonel Sir Francis Henry Douglas Charlton Whitmore (1872–1962) on 7 November 1920. He served as Lord Lieutenant of Essex from 1936 to 1958. The Rainham War Memorial was added to the National Heritage List for England on 25 March 2002 as a Grade II listed structure. A Grade II structure is felt to be nationally important and of special interest.

The Remembrance Day service continues to be held annually by the memorial. Also referred to as Armistice Day or Poppy Day, it is observed on 11 November. The residents of Rainham pay their respects by placing crosses and fresh poppy wreaths adjacent to the monument.

One of the soldiers represented on the monument is Second Lieutenant Ralph Luxmore Curtis, a World War I flying ace credited with fifteen aerial victories. A native of Rainham, the nineteen-year-old engaged in aerial combat with Hermann Göring, commander of Jasta 27 and future head of the Luftwaffe.

== See also ==
- List of public art in Havering
