= John Basil Poel =

John Basil Poel (14 April 1881 – 23 October 1937) was Chairman of the Romford Urban District Council in the County of Essex from 1931 to 1932. A son of the well-respected Romford businessman William Poel, he also ran many businesses and contributed greatly to his local community.

== Family and personal life ==
John was born in Romford on 14 April 1881, the son of William Poel (d.1924) and Caroline Poel née McDermott (1847–1924). The Poel family lived in North Street, Romford for many years in what was locally known as Poel's Yard (John was born there). By the age of 19, John had become a foreman in the Yard, as his father let out some of the outbuildings to tradesmen such as bootmakers.

On 12 September 1907 he married Miriam Gertrude May Bacon (2 January 1882 – 28 April 1974), the daughter of Richard Bacon (1849–1913), the landlord of the Wheatsheaf public house in Hornchurch and his first wife Mary Ann Cowell (1850–1882). They had five children, all born in Romford:

- John Raymond Poel (1909–1992)
- Mary Eileen Poel (1912–2003)
- Stanley Bacon Poel (1914–1986)
- Kathleen Mary Poel (1918–1967)
- Philip Laurence Poel (1922–2000)

He was a keen bowler, and was president of the Romford Bowling Club as well as vice-president of the County Association.

== Businesses and local government ==
John operated the firm Poel Brothers out of North Street and it is possible some of his brothers also assisted him in running it. The company provided many services including: Carriers to London; Horse Motor and Steam Cartage and Haulage Contractors; and Clinker, Sand, Ballast, Hogging, Hardcore etc. supplied.

In 1924, the Romford Ice & Cold Storage Company was established and Poel Brothers were contracted to deliver the ice that it produced, as indicated in the extract below:

"Most of the fish, butcher and perishable food shops relied on John Poel, who traded under the name of Romford Ice and Cold Storage, delivering blocks of ice to them for their cold storage cabinets. Freezers and 'fridges were not in common use in the 1920s, so perishable food, especially fish, had to be disposed of as soon as possible."

The Romford Ice Factory, formerly in St Edward's Way, was liquidated in 1978 and the buildings have since been demolished.

=== Romford U.D.C. ===
On 17 April 1931, at the annual meeting of the Romford Urban District Council, it was announced that Vice-chairman Poel was to take over from Cllr John James Crowe, J.P. as Chairman. The Council felt that their chairman "should have the respect, not only of the members of the Council, but of the whole of the inhabitants of the town", and decided that Poel fitted the job description. He served for a year and was replaced in 1932 by Cllr William Thomas Boston.

== Death ==
On 23 October 1937, after 10 months of illness which forced him to retire from local government, he died at his home at 40 The Chase, Romford. A large funeral service was held for him at the church of St Edward the Confessor in the Market Place on 28 October 1937. He was buried in Crow Lane Cemetery, Romford, where around 100 wreaths were laid by family, friends and colleagues.
