= The Diver =

Sculpture by John Kaufman

Coordinates: 51.49743°N 0.18236°E

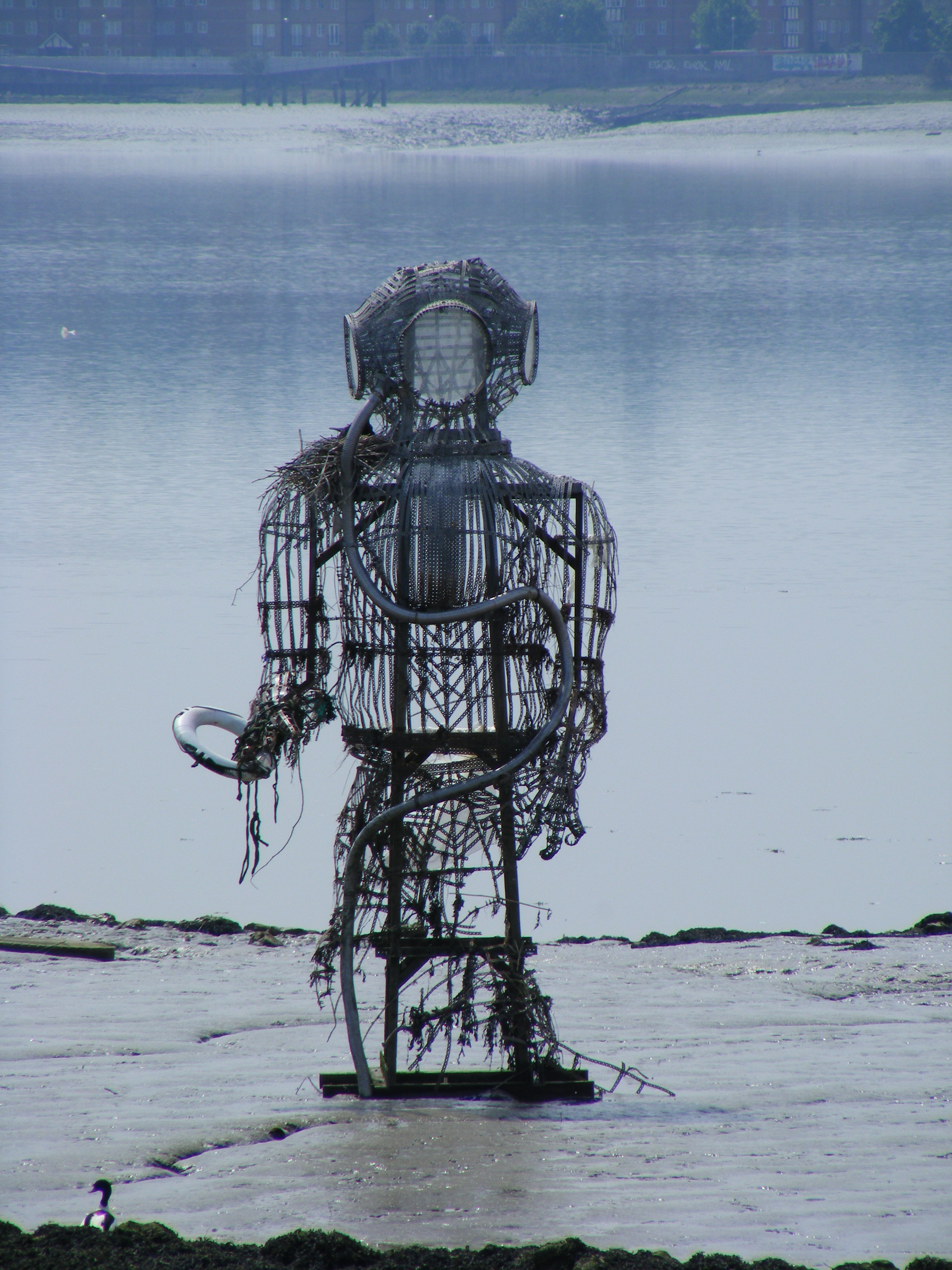
The Diver

The Diver (full name The Diver: Regeneration) is a sculpture by John Kaufman located in the River Thames at Rainham, east London.

== Appearance ==
The Diver is made of 300 metres (980 ft) galvanised steel bands on a steel frame and is 15 feet (4.6 m) tall and approximately 6 feet (1.8 m) wide. It is partly submerged every high tide and totally submerged by spring tides. It has 3,000 nuts and bolts and weighs 3 tons. It is secured 26 feet (7.9 m) into the Thames mud.

== History ==
John Kaufman (1941–2002) was a self-taught sculptor living and working in the London Borough of Havering, East London. Inspired by prominent public artist Don Rankin to create his own piece of public art, John embarked on the Diver project in 1995. Initially he financed the project himself but later received funding from Cleanaway, a local refuse company. Receiving mentoring from Don Rankin, support from the Havering London Borough Council in the person of Adam Nardell and additional financial support from friend, John Bowyer, John was able to complete and site the statue in August 2000 in its current location. It was installed at 3:30 am in order to avoid river traffic.

The piece is inspired by Kaufman's own family history. His grandfather Friederich Johann Andreas Kaufmann was a diver in the London Docks c. 1900. The sculpture stands as a monument to this man and all working men of the area who have worked in difficult and dangerous conditions.

Soon after the completion of the sculpture, John fell ill and died in 2002. After his death, a wake was held at the location of the sculpture with family and friends.

== Location ==
The sculpture is sited in the River Thames in Rainham, East London. It can be reached from the Ferry Lane Industrial area and Coldharbour Lane. The car park is found by passing the Tilda rice warehouse.

== See also ==
- List of public art in Havering
