= Coronation Gardens =

Park in Romford, London, England

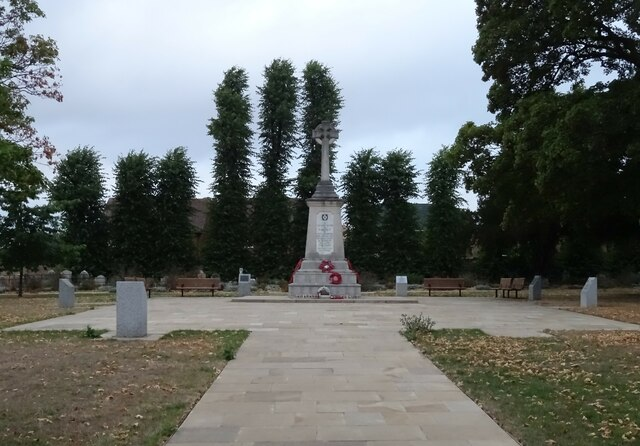
- Romford War Memorial in Coronation Gardens
- Interactive map of Coronation Gardens
- Type: Public park
- Location: Romford, Havering, London, England
- Coordinates: 51°34′53″N 0°11′07″E
- Area: 0.8 acres (0.32 ha)
- Created: 1953
- Operator: Havering London Borough Council
- Status: Open year-round
- Website: www.havering.gov.uk/open-spaces/coronation-gardens

Listed Building – Grade II
- Official name: Romford War Memorial
- Designated: 9 Januarty 2018
- Reference no.: 1452855

Coronation Gardens is a small public park in Romford, London, England. It is the location of the Romford war memorial and is a former cemetery.

== First Romford cememtery ==
In 1844, the site was intended to be the location of a replacement for the St Edward's Church in Market Place, but was not built. It was then used as a cemetery, consecrated by the Bishop of Rochester on 21 September 1850.

It was superseded when it became full by Crow Lane Cemetery in 1871.

== Park ==
The site was transferred to Romford Urban District Council in 1895 when the burial board was dissolved.

The headstones were cleared in 1953 in order to create the park and name it in honour of the Coronation of Elizabeth II.

== Romford War Memorial ==
The war memorial, originally unveiled in 1921, was relocated from Laurie Square in 1970 as part of the redevelopment of central Romford and the new ring road.

Consideration of a memorial for the town started in 1916, during the First World War. The initial meeting to discuss the matter in December 1916 was called by the church and held at St Edward's. The issue was first discussed by Romford Urban District Council in January 1919. By January 1920 little progress had been made, due to anticipated cost, and further discussion was deferred at a council meeting for six months. Further delay was caused because Romford Council was reluctant to pay for a memorial by increasing the rates.

In 1920, a private citizen, C. M. Dyer of Gresham Lodge, took charge. He erected a model of a proposed memorial in Laurie Square and organised a public meeting. Costs were estimated at £500 (equivalent to £19,322 in 2025) with £800 raised in total. The first donation was from Ind, Coope & Co of the Romford Brewery, with many smaller donations coming from residents. Romford Council was considering helping to pay for the foundations in 1921, but did not. Works were contracted in September 1921 to Banks-Martin of East Ham, who was architect of the East Ham War Memorial.

The memorial was dedicated and unveiled by Lord Lambourne on 18 September 1921.
