= Richard G. F. Uniacke =

Richard Gordon FitzGerald Uniacke, FRSAI (19 August 1867 – 11 November 1934) was a British genealogist and librarian. He was the eldest son of the Rev. Robert FitzGerald Uniacke, late vicar of Tandridge, Surrey, a descendant of an old Irish family, the Uniackes of Uniacke and Castleton, County Cork. He was a great grandson of Richard John Uniacke (1753–1830), Attorney-General of Nova Scotia.

Born in 1867, he was educated at Repton and Trinity College, Oxford, where he graduated with honours in history, and rowed in his college eight. A Latin and historical scholar and genealogist, Uniacke was a Fellow of the Royal Society of Antiquaries of Ireland. For many years he served as assistant librarian at the College of Arms. A genealogist and archivist, in 1894 Richard G. F. Uniacke published "Some Old County Cork Families: The Uniackes of Youghal" in the Journal of the Cork Historical and Archaeological Society.

== Personal life ==
In 1882, he married Cecilia Monica Lambert, of Garratt's Hall, Banstead, Surrey. The couple had three sons and two daughters. He died in 1934, aged 67, and was survived by his wife, one son, Richard Heygate FitzGerald Uniacke (1898–1972), and one daughter, Gwladys Patricia (born c. 1901–died 1980), who married, in 1926, to Major Sir Wilfred John Wilson Croker Barrow, 5th Bt. (1897–1960). Another son, Desmond Percival FitzGerald Uniacke (1895–1933) predeceased his parents, as did two other children who died as minors.

== Sources ==
- "Newspaper Abstracts: UNIACKE". Rootsweb.
