= William Walker (RFC airman) =

- Born: Unknown
- Died: Unknown
- Military career
- Allegiance: England
- Branch: Aviation
- Rank: Second Air Mechanic
- Unit: No. 48 Squadron RFC
- Awards: Distinguished Conduct Medal

Second Air Mechanic William Walker DCM was a World War I flying ace credited with five aerial victories.
