= Parks and open spaces in the London Borough of Havering =

The London Borough of Havering is a London borough in northeast London, England. Part of Outer London, much of its area is protected from development by the Metropolitan Green Belt and more than half the borough is now parkland. Its parks and open spaces range from the large urban park to village greens and there are more than a hundred of them in total, mostly in the care of Havering London Borough Council (which are patrolled by Havering Parks Constabulary), but some by other organisations. Part of the extensive community forest known as Thames Chase is also within the borough, and a large new regional parkland is currently under development, called Wildspace. There are 93 Sites of Importance for Nature Conservation in Havering. Other parks and open spaces are:

Park or open space	Green Flag	Co-ordinates
Bedfords Park	check	51.606°N 0.192°E
Central Park		51.607°N 0.228°E
Cottons Park	check	51.575°N 0.172°E
Harold Wood Park	check	51.587°N 0.236°E
Harrow Lodge Park		51.557°N 0.202°E
Havering Country Park		51.614°N 0.170°E
Hornchurch Country Park		51.539°N 0.208°E
Haynes Park	check	
Hylands Park	check	51.571°N 0.201°E
King George's Playing Fields (also known as Mawney Park)		51.585°N 0.165°E
Ingrebourne Valley Greenway: Gaynes Parkway; Hacton Parkway; Pages Wood; Rainham Creekside Path; Suttons Parkway		
Langtons Gardens		51.565°N 0.217°E
Lawns Park		51.596°N 0.168°E
Lodge Farm Park	check	51.582°N 0.192°E
Pyrgo Park		51.619°N 0.199°E
Queen's Green		
Raphael Park		51.589°N 0.190°E
Rise Park		51.597°N 0.185°E
St Andrew's Park	check	
Tylers Common (also known as Upminster Common)		51.592°N 0.259°E
Upminster Park	check	51.554°N 0.246°E
Windmill Field		51.559°N 0.245°E
Wildspace		51.502°N 0.195°E
