= Fielders Sports Ground =

Cricket ground in Hornchurch, England

Coordinates: 51.5656°N 0.2172°E

Fielders Sports Ground is a cricket ground in Hornchurch, England. It was formerly part of the grounds of Langtons House and was known as Langton Park when it was an important venue.

The ground is located on land that was part of the grounds of Langtons House, built in the 18th century. The park, known as Langton Park, was the home of Hornchurch Cricket Club and staged important matches from 1787 to 1793. At that time, the Hornchurch club was representative of Essex as a county.

The earliest recorded important match at Langton Park was in May 1785 when Essex played Middlesex and the last was Essex v MCC in May 1793. The ground faded from the records as the Napoleonic Wars progressed and Essex ceased to have an important county team.

By 1889, the Hornchurch club had moved from Langtons to nearby Grey Towers. It is still used by the club as a secondary location to Harrow Lodge Park.
