= 1935 Hornchurch Urban District Council election =

1935 UK local government election

- 4 April 1935

6 of 21 seats to the Hornchurch Urban District Council 11 seats needed for a majority
	First party	Second party
	RA	LAB
Party	Ratepayers	Labour
Seats before	12	4
Seats won	3	3
Seats after	10	6
Seat change	▼2	▲2
	Third party	Fourth party
	IND	TWA
Party	Independent	Town Ward Association
Seats before	2	1
Seats won	1	0
Seats after	2	1
Seat change	Steady	Steady

The 10th election to Hornchurch Urban District Council took place on 4 April 1935, for 6 of 21 council seats.

== Background ==
In 1935 six of the seats were up for reelection:

- Emerson Park, 1 seat (out of 3)
- Harold Wood, 1 seat (out of 2)
- Hornchurch Town, 1 seat (out of 4)
- North West Hornchurch, 2 seats (out of 5)
- Rainham, 1 seat (out of 2)
- Upminster, 1 seat (out of 3)

The seats in Hornchurch parish were up for election three years prior in 1932 and in Rainham and Upminster in 1934.

== Results ==
The results were as follows:

=== Emerson Park ===
Emerson Park
Party	Candidate	Votes	%	±%
Ratepayers	Frances Sherring	1,081		
Labour	Arthur Twigger	776		
Turnout				
Ratepayers hold		Swing		

=== Harold Wood ===
Harold Wood
Party	Candidate	Votes	%	±%
Independent	F. Davis	629		
Labour	Sidney Barnes	409		
Turnout				
Independent hold		Swing		

=== Hornchurch Town ===
Hornchurch Town
Party	Candidate	Votes	%	±%
Ratepayers	Robert Beard	874		
Labour	Annie King	541		
Turnout				
Ratepayers hold		Swing		

=== North West Hornchurch ===
North West Hornchurch
Party	Candidate	Votes	%	±%
Labour	Thomas Martin	1,216		
Labour	William Maunder	1,160		
Ratepayers	S. Youngs	1,070		
Ratepayers	A. Bragg	1,006		
Turnout				
Labour gain from Ratepayers		Swing		
Labour gain from Ratepayers		Swing		

=== Rainham ===
Rainham
Party	Candidate	Votes	%	±%
Labour	A. Holmes	349		
Independent	A. Raven	328		
Turnout				
Labour hold		Swing		

=== Upminster ===
Upminster
Party	Candidate	Votes	%	±%
Ratepayers	F. Farnan	334		
Independent	H. Martin	117		
Turnout				
Ratepayers hold		Swing		

F. Farnan was elected for a three-year term but retired early in 1937 and was replaced by William Bunch.
