= Hornchurch Cricket Club =

Historical English cricket team

Team information
- Established: 1783
- Home venue: Harrow Lodge Park

Hornchurch Cricket Club is a cricket club based at Harrow Lodge Park in Hornchurch, England.

== History ==
2024 T10 European Cricket League Champions.

Hornchurch Cricket Club was established in 1783. The club had several good players and for the next ten years it was representative of Essex as a county, the club's name sometimes being interchangeable with that of the county in the scorecards of historically important matches. Essex cricket faded during the Napoleonic Wars and Hornchurch played only minor matches from 1794. The home ground was initially Langton Park, moving to Grey Towers by 1889. Grey Towers was purchased by the army during the First World War and after using a field in Wingletye Lane the club moved to Queen's Green in 1925, moving to Harrow Lodge Park in 1947.

== Teams ==
Hornchurch Cricket Club runs five Saturday teams all of which five compete in the Essex Premier League and two Sunday teams as well as various Youth teams. Its home ground is at Harrow Lodge Park. During the summer the club runs a community coaching scheme called "Cricket for All" at the Harrow Lodge Ground.
