= 1933 Hornchurch Urban District Council election =

1933 English local government election

- 3 April 1933

5 of 13 seats to the Hornchurch Urban District Council 7 seats needed for a majority
	First party	Second party	Third party
	RA	IND	LAB
Party	Ratepayers	Independent	Labour
Seats before	10	2	1
Seats won	3	0	1
Seats after	10	2	1
Seat change	Steady	Steady	Steady

The eighth election to Hornchurch Urban District Council took place on 3 April 1933. The election was for 5 of 13 seats on the council. They were the last set of elections before the expansion of Hornchurch Urban District in 1934.

== Background ==
In 1933 five of the seats were up for re-election:

- Hornchurch Village, 2 seats (out of 4)
- North West Hornchurch, 1 seat (out of 5)
- South Hornchurch, 2 seats (out of 2)

There were no elections in the Harold Wood ward. These seats were last contested three years prior at the election in 1930.

== Results ==
Polling took place on 3 April 1933. The results were as follows:

All the winning candidates were the 'retiring' councillors from the previous election in 1930.

=== Hornchurch Village ===
Hornchurch Village
Party	Candidate	Votes	%	±%
Ratepayers	Alexander Ferguson	937		
Ratepayers	Charles Parker	803		
Labour	Willie Webb	214		
Labour	Mrs. Tyrrell	193		
Independent	F. Standen	149		
Registered electors		5,614		
Turnout		1,152		
Ratepayers hold		Swing		
Ratepayers hold		Swing		

=== North West Hornchurch ===
North West Hornchurch
Party	Candidate	Votes	%	±%
Ratepayers	Frederick Cole	1,029		
Labour	J. Matthews	899		
Registered electors		7,443		
Turnout		1,934		
Ratepayers hold		Swing		

=== South Hornchurch ===
South Hornchurch
Party	Candidate	Votes	%	±%
Labour	Benjamin Tarr	257		
Independent	F. Edwards	188		
Ratepayers	E. Horsham	27		
Registered electors		1,734		
Turnout		490		
Labour hold		Swing		
