= 1939 Hornchurch Urban District Council election =

1939 English local government election

- 1 April 1939

7 of 13 seats to the Hornchurch Urban District Council 11 seats needed for a majority
	First party	Second party	Third party
	LAB	RA	CON
Party	Labour	Ratepayers	Conservative
Seats before	10	9	1
Seats won	3	4	0
Seats after	10	9	1
Seat change	Steady	Steady	Steady

The 14th election to Hornchurch Urban District Council took place on 1 April 1939. The election was for 7 of 13 seats on the council. It was the last regular election ahead of the Second World War and there would not be another election until 1946.

== Background ==
In 1939 seven of the seats were up for re-election:

- Cranham, 1 seat (out of 1)
- Emerson Park, 1 seat (out of 3)
- Hornchurch Town, 2 seats (out of 4)
- North West Hornchurch, 1 seat (out of 5)
- Thameside, 1 seat (out of 1)
- Upminster, 1 seat (out of 3)

There were no elections in the Harold Wood or Rainham wards. These seats were last contested three years prior at the election in 1936.

Councillors were elected for a three-year term due to end in 1942. However, due to the Second World War, and the provisions of the Local Elections and Register of Electors (Temporary Provisions) Acts 1939–1944 and the Representation of the People Act 1945, their terms were extended until the 1948 election. Councillors elected in 1937, 1938 and 1939, that were due to go out in 1940, 1941 and 1942, had their terms extended to 1946, 1947 and 1948.

== Results ==
The results were as follows:

=== Cranham ===
Cranham
Party	Candidate	Votes	%	±%
Ratepayers	Hereward Wake (Note: Hereward Wake was previously elected for a three-year term in 1936.)	413		
Labour	A. Wren	253		
Turnout				
Ratepayers hold		Swing		

=== Emerson Park ===
Emerson Park
Party	Candidate	Votes	%	±%
Ratepayers	A. Hulkes	1,116		
Labour	C. Stevens	909		
Turnout				
Ratepayers hold		Swing		

=== Hornchurch Town ===
Hornchurch Town
Party	Candidate	Votes	%	±%
Ratepayers	Alexander Ferguson (Note: Alexander Ferguson was previously elected for a three-year term in 1936.)	1,018		
Labour	Annie King (Note: Annie King was previously elected for a three-year term in 1936.)	966		
Labour	S. Day	932		
Ratepayers	C. Swan	875		
Independent	Charles Parker (Note: Charles Parker was previously elected for a thre-year term in 1936 for Emerson Park.)	277		
Turnout				
Ratepayers hold		Swing		
Labour hold		Swing		

=== North West Hornchurch ===
North West Hornchurch
Party	Candidate	Votes	%	±%
Labour	Arthur Twigger (Note: Arthur Twigger was previously elected for a three-year term in 1936.)	Unopposed		
Labour hold				

=== Thameside ===
Thameside
Party	Candidate	Votes	%	±%
Labour	Benjamin Tarr (Note: Benjamin Tarr was previously elected for a three-year term in 1936.)	Unopposed		
Labour hold				

=== Upminster ===
Upminster
Party	Candidate	Votes	%	±%
Ratepayers	C. Webb	1,668		
Independent	David Ramsay (Note: David Ramsay was previously elected for a three-year term in 1936.)	589		
Labour	E. Hewett	424		
Turnout				
Ratepayers hold		Swing		
