= 1928 Hornchurch Urban District Council election =

1928 UK local government election

- 2 April 1928

4 of 13 seats to the Hornchurch Urban District Council 7 seats needed for a majority
	First party	Second party	Third party
	RA	LAB	IND
Party	Ratepayers	Labour	Independent
Seats before	7	4	2
Seats won	3	0	1
Seats after	9	2	2
Seat change	▲2	▼2	Steady

The third election to Hornchurch Urban District Council took place on 2 April 1928. The election was for 4 of 13 seats on the council. The election gave the Ratepayers' Association a majority on the council.

== Background ==
The council had decided in March 1928 to allow tennis to be played on Sundays at Hylands Park and this proved to be a controversial issue dominating the election.

In 1928 four of the seats were up for re-election:

- Harold Wood, 1 seat (out of 2)
- Hornchurch Village, 1 seat (out of 4)
- North West Hornchurch, 2 seats (out of 5)

There were no elections in the South Hornchurch ward. Polling took place on 2 April 1928.

== Results ==
4 of 13 seats on the council were up for election. The results were as follows:

=== Harold Wood ===
Harold Wood
Party	Candidate	Votes	%	±%
Independent	Robert Beard	263		
Labour	E. Russell	187		
Turnout				
Independent hold		Swing		

=== Hornchurch Village ===
Hornchurch Village
Party	Candidate	Votes	%	±%
Ratepayers	Charles Fielder (Note: Charles Fielder was previously elected for a two-year term in 1926.)	588		
Labour	Benjamin Tarr	261		
Turnout				
Ratepayers hold		Swing		

=== North West Hornchurch ===
North West Hornchurch
Party	Candidate	Votes	%	±%
Ratepayers	Edith Field	595		
Ratepayers	H. Finch	589		
Labour	J. Matthews	557		
Labour	S. Hawkins	540		
Turnout				
Ratepayers gain from Labour		Swing		
Ratepayers gain from Labour		Swing		
