= Grey Towers (disambiguation) =

Grey Towers was a house in Hornchurch, England

Grey Towers can also refer to:

- Grey Towers Castle, Arcadia University, Glenside, Pennsylvania
- Grey Towers National Historic Site, Dingman Township
