= 1927 Hornchurch Urban District Council election =

1927 English local government election

- 4 April 1927

6 of 13 seats to the Hornchurch Urban District Council 7 seats needed for a majority
	First party	Second party	Third party
	RA	LAB	IND
Party	Ratepayers	Labour	Independent
Seats before	6	4	3
Seats won	4	1	1
Seats after	7	4	2
Seat change	▲1	Steady	▼1

The second election to Hornchurch Urban District Council took place on 4 April 1927. The election was for 6 of 13 seats on the council. The election increased the membership of the Ratepayers' Association on the council.

== Background ==
The 1926 election had been for all 13 councillors. In 1927 six of the seats were up for re-election:

- Harold Wood, 1 seat (out of 2), a by-election caused by the resignation of G. Matthews
- Hornchurch Village, 2 seats (out of 4)
- North West Hornchurch, 1 seat (out of 5)
- South Hornchurch, 2 seats (out of 2), one of them a by-election caused by the resignation of E. Poole.

Polling took place on 4 April 1927.

== Results ==
The results were as follows:

=== Harold Wood ===
Harold Wood
Party	Candidate	Votes	%	±%
Independent	Frederick Davis	331		
Labour	E. Russell	125		
Turnout				
Independent hold		Swing		

=== Hornchurch Village ===
Hornchurch Village
Party	Candidate	Votes	%	±%
Ratepayers	Alexander Ferguson	883		
Ratepayers	Charles Parker	568		
Independent	Robert Beard	481		
Labour	B. Tarr	273		
Labour	Willie Webb	223		
Turnout				
Ratepayers gain from Independent		Swing		
Ratepayers hold		Swing		

=== North West Hornchurch ===
North West Hornchurch
Party	Candidate	Votes	%	±%
Ratepayers	Frederick Cole	697		
Labour	J. Matthews	628		
Turnout				
Ratepayers gain from Labour		Swing		

=== South Hornchurch ===
South Hornchurch
Party	Candidate	Votes	%	±%
Ratepayers	J. Craig	147		
Labour	W. Stanton	143		
Labour	G. Pratt	143		
Ratepayers	W. Goodchild	142		
Turnout				
Ratepayers hold		Swing		
Labour gain from Ratepayers		Swing		

Three candidates were tied for the second seat, but on a recount Goodchild lost one vote. Stanton and Pratt, each receiving 143 votes, resolved the election by spinning a coin.
