= 1932 Dagenham Urban District Council election =

1932 UK local government election

- 2 April 1932

10 of 23 seats to the Dagenham Urban District Council 12 seats needed for a majority
	First party	Second party
	LAB	RA
Party	Labour	Ratepayers
Seats before	18	6
Seats won	7	3
Seats after	17	7
Seat change	▼1	▲1
Majority party before election
Labour Party
Majority party after election
Labour Party

The seventh election to Dagenham Urban District Council took place on 2 April 1932. Ratepayers' associations had become active in all wards of the district and put forward a full slate of candidates for the first time. They gained one additional councillor from the Labour Party.

== Background ==
In 1932 ten of the seats were up for re-election:

- Becontree Heath, 4 seats (out of 8), one of them a by-election caused by the resignation of A. Olive.
- Chadwell Heath, 2 seats (out of 5)
- Dagenham, 4 seats (out of 10)

Ratepayers' associations for the three wards met in January and agreed to offer a full slate of candidates in the election. In 1931 the Chadwell Heath Ratepayers' Association had helped to set up the associations in Becontree Heath and Dagenham wards.

Polling took place on 2 April 1932.

== Results ==
The results were as follows:

=== Becontree Heath ===
Becontree Heath
Party	Candidate	Votes	%	±%
Labour	Samuel Philips (Note: Samuel Philips was previously elected for a three-year term in 1929.)	1,152		
Labour	Louis Fitzgerald	1,103		
Labour	Charles McAlister	1,060		
Labour	Mary Marley	1,056		
Ratepayers	George Coppen	876		
Ratepayers	Harry Newcombe	788		
Ratepayers	Walter Matthews	712		
Ratepayers	Frederick Parsons	670		
Independent	Roy Fisher (Note: Roy Fisher and Edward Ayres stood together.)	248		
Independent	Edward Ayres	192		
Communist	Malcolm McFarlane	191		
Independent	Alfred Bale (Note: Alfred Bale was previously elected for a three-year term in 1929 as a Labour Party candidate.)	122		
Communist	James Cousins	109		
Communist	Percy Bandy	101		
Turnout				
Labour hold		Swing		
Labour hold		Swing		
Labour hold		Swing		
Labour hold		Swing		

=== Chadwell Heath ===
Chadwell Heath
Party	Candidate	Votes	%	±%
Ratepayers	Charlie Duthrie	883		
Ratepayers	Benjamin Saunders	842		
Ratepayers	Esther McAlister	214		
Turnout				
Ratepayers hold		Swing		
Ratepayers hold		Swing		

=== Dagenham ===
Dagenham
Party	Candidate	Votes	%	±%
Labour	Augustus Gibbs	1,347		
Labour	William Gray (Note: William Gray was previously elected for a three-year term in 1929.)	1,313		
Ratepayers	George Gough	1,269		
Labour	Lily Townsend (Note: Lily Townsend was previously elected for a three-year term in 1929.)	1,262		
Ratepayers	James Lamb	1,208		
Labour	John Preston (Note: John Preston was previously elected for a three-year term in 1929.)	1,205		
Ratepayers	Henry Hawke	1,192		
Ratepayers	James Sorrell	1,143		
Communist	William Hall	268		
Communist	William Bolton	259		
Communist	Laurence Fawbert	211		
Communist	James Scanlan	209		
Turnout				
Labour hold		Swing		
Labour hold		Swing		
Ratepayers gain from Labour		Swing		
Labour hold		Swing		
