= 1931 Hornchurch Urban District Council election =

1931 UK local government election

- 30 March 1931

4 of 13 seats to the Hornchurch Urban District Council 7 seats needed for a majority
	First party	Second party	Third party
	RA	LAB	IND
Party	Ratepayers	Labour	Independent
Seats before	8	3	2
Seats won	3	0	1
Seats after	9	3	1
Seat change	▲1	Steady	▼1

The sixth election to Hornchurch Urban District Council took place on 30 March 1931. The election was for 4 of 13 seats on the council. The seats were last contested in 1928.

== Background ==
In 1931 four of the seats were up for re-election:

- Harold Wood, 1 seat (out of 2)
- Hornchurch Village, 1 seat (out of 4)
- North West Hornchurch, 2 seats (out of 5)

There were no elections in the South Hornchurch ward. These seats were last contested three years prior at the election in 1928.

== Results ==
4 of 13 seats on the council were up for election. The results were as follows:

=== Harold Wood ===
Harold Wood
Party	Candidate	Votes	%	±%
Independent	E. Potter	Unopposed		
Ratepayers gain from Independent		Swing		

=== Hornchurch Village ===
Hornchurch Village
Party	Candidate	Votes	%	±%
Ratepayers	Charles Fielder	741		
Independent	F. Standen	177		
Labour	Willie Webb	146		
Turnout				
Ratepayers hold		Swing		

=== North West Hornchurch ===
North West Hornchurch
Party	Candidate	Votes	%	±%
Ratepayers	J. Everson	1,098		
Ratepayers	E. Field	1,096		
Labour	W. Hoppe	578		
Labour	A. Abrahams	558		
Turnout				
Ratepayers hold		Swing		
Ratepayers hold		Swing		
