= St John's Parish Church, South Hornchurch =

Coordinates: 51.535°N 0.1963°E

St John & St Matthews Church, South Hornchurch
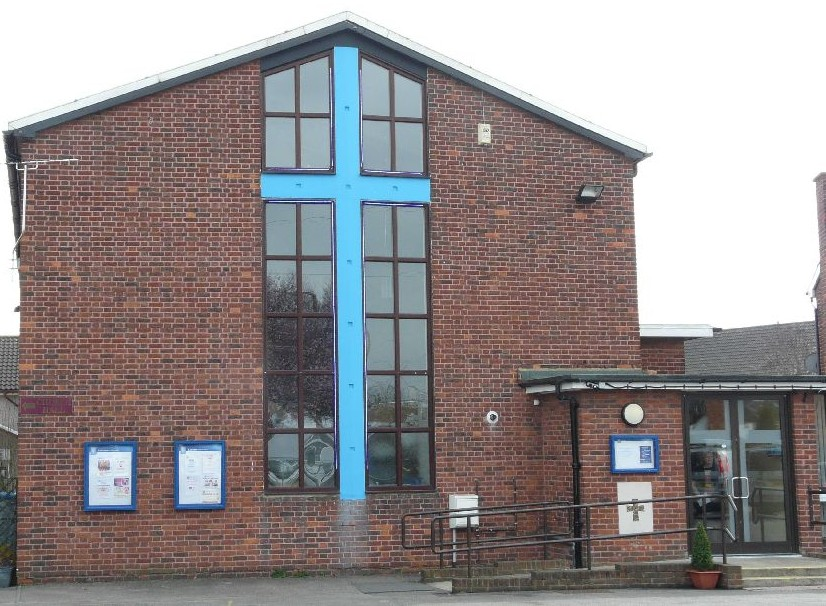
- St John & St Matthews Church, South Hornchurch
- Denomination: Church of England
- Website: https://www.sjandsm.org/

Administration
- Province: Canterbury
- Diocese: Chelmsford
- Archdeaconry: Barking
- Deanery: Havering

Clergy
- Vicar: Rev. Kevin Browning

St John & St Matthew's Church, South Hornchurch, is an Anglican parish church in South Hornchurch, London Borough of Havering, England.

== History ==
The church was made by Bishop of Barking on 9 March 1957.
