= 1932 Hornchurch Urban District Council election =

1932 UK local government election

- 4 April 1932

5 of 13 seats to the Hornchurch Urban District Council 7 seats needed for a majority
	First party	Second party	Third party
	RA	IND	LAB
Party	Ratepayers	Independent	Labour
Seats before	9	1	3
Seats won	3	2	0
Seats after	10	2	1
Seat change	▲1	▲1	▼2

The seventh election to Hornchurch Urban District Council took place on 4 April 1932, for 5 of 13 council seats. The seats were last contested in 1929.

== Background ==
In 1932 five of the seats were up for reelection:

- Harold Wood, 1 seat (out of 2)
- Hornchurch Village, 1 seat (out of 4)
- North West Hornchurch, 2 seats (out of 5)
- South Hornchurch, 1 seat (out of 1)

These seats were last contested three years prior at the election in 1929.

== Results ==
Polling took place on 4 April 1932. The results were as follows:

=== Harold Wood ===
Harold Wood
Party	Candidate	Votes	%	±%
Independent	F. Davis	581		
Labour	Willie Webb	95		
Turnout				
Independent hold		Swing		

=== Hornchurch Village ===
Hornchurch Village
Party	Candidate	Votes	%	±%
Ratepayers	Edgar Bratchell	866		
Labour	Benjamin Tarr	214		
Turnout				
Ratepayers hold		Swing		

Edgar Bratchell died in office on 14 April 1934, causing a by-election on 14 June 1934.

=== North West Hornchurch ===
North West Hornchurch
Party	Candidate	Votes	%	±%
Ratepayers	John Matthews	973		
Ratepayers	Florence Sherring	953		
Labour	J. Matthews	787		
Labour	T. Martin	702		
Turnout				
Ratepayers gain from Labour		Swing		
Ratepayers hold		Swing		

=== South Hornchurch ===
South Hornchurch
Party	Candidate	Votes	%	±%
Independent	F. Standen	247		
Labour	L. Mascall	187		
Turnout				
Independent gain from Labour		Swing		

F. Standen resigned on 15 May 1934, causing a by-election on 14 June 1934.
