= Havering Hockey Club =

British field hockey club

Havering Hockey Club is a field hockey club based in Hornchurch which is in the London Borough of Havering, Greater London, England. The club consists of 4 Men's teams and 4 Ladies teams playing at varying levels. The club currently plays its home fixtures at The Campion School in Hornchurch and its clubhouse is in Harrow Lodge Park.

The team plays its home games at The Campion school, Hornchurch.

== History ==
Originally called the Hornchurch Hockey club, which was founded in 1922, the name was changed by Mrs E Gallant, then chairman of the council's leisure committee, in order to accommodate those outside Hornchurch.

While originally sharing a pitch with the RAF Hornchurch, the club moved in 1972 to Harrow Lodge Park, on the request of Havering Council. This is where they have their clubhouse today, some 40 years later.
