= 1934 Hornchurch Urban District Council election =

1934 English local government election

- March 1934

12 of 21 seats to the Hornchurch Urban District Council 11 seats needed for a majority
	First party	Second party
	RA	LAB
Party	Ratepayers	Labour
Seats before	10	1
Seats won	7	3
Seats after	12	4
Seat change	▲2	▲3
	Third party	Fourth party
	IND	TWA
Party	Independent	Town Ward Association
Seats before	2	New
Seats won	1	1
Seats after	3	1
Seat change	▲1	▲1

The ninth election to Hornchurch Urban District Council took place in March 1934. The election was for 12 of 20 seats on the council. They were the first set of elections for the expanded Hornchurch Urban District, that was extended on 1 April 1934 to take in Cranham, Rainham and Upminster.

== Background ==
=== Hornchurch parish ===
The number of councillors for Hornchurch parish increased from 13 to 15. (Note: Emerson Park 3, Harold Wood 2, North West 5, Thameside 1, Town 4.) Councillors continued to serve their three year terms from previous elections. In 1934 the following seats were up for re-election:

- Harold Wood, 1 seat (out of 2)
- Hornchurch Town, 1 seat (out of 4)
- North West Hornchurch, 2 seats (out of 5)

These seats were last contested three years prior at the election in 1931. In Hornchurch parish, two additional seats were contested in 1934:

- Emerson Park, 1 seat
- Hornchurch Town, 1 seat

=== Expanded area ===
On 1 April 1934, Hornchurch Urban District expanded to take in a large area including Cranham, Rainham and Upminster. In the expanded urban district area all the 6 new seats were up for election:

- Cranham, 1 seat
- Rainham, 2 seats
- Upminster, 3 seats

== Results ==
The results were as follows:

=== Cranham ===
Cranham
Party	Candidate	Votes	%	±%
Ratepayers	Hereward Wake	Unopposed		
Ratepayers win (new seat)				

=== Emerson Park ===
Emerson Park
Party	Candidate	Votes	%	±%
Ratepayers	E. Field	620		
Labour	A. Twigger	518		
Independent	H. Pinney	411		
Turnout				
Ratepayers win (new seat)				

=== Harold Wood ===
Harold Wood
Party	Candidate	Votes	%	±%
Ratepayers	E. Potter	522		
Labour	R. Osborn	264		
Turnout				
Ratepayers hold		Swing		

=== Hornchurch Town ===
Hornchurch Town
Party	Candidate	Votes	%	±%
Hornchurch Town Ward Association	O. Ashdown	763		
Ratepayers	A. Champion	744		
Labour	Willie Webb	636		
Labour	H. Tipping	615		
Turnout				
Hornchurch Town Ward Association gain from Ratepayers		Swing		
Ratepayers hold		Swing		

=== North West Hornchurch ===
North West Hornchurch
Party	Candidate	Votes	%	±%
Labour	J. Matthews	1,404		
Independent	J. Wren	1,256		
Labour	T. Martin	1,160		
Turnout				
Labour gain from Ratepayers		Swing		
Independent gain from Ratepayers		Swing		

=== Rainham ===
Rainham
Party	Candidate	Votes	%	±%
Labour	T. Willoughby	576		
Labour	T. Swain	511		
Independent	H. Gunary	430		
Independent	H. Swann	417		
Turnout				
Labour win (new seat)				
Labour win (new seat)				

=== Upminster ===
Upminster
Party	Candidate	Votes	%	±%
Ratepayers	G. Cardnell	1,113		
Ratepayers	David Ramsay	993		
Ratepayers	F. Farnan	909		
Chamber of commerce	J. Gilbert	477		
Chamber of commerce	A. Rumsey	255		
Turnout				
Ratepayers win (new seat)				
Ratepayers win (new seat)				
Ratepayers win (new seat)				
