= 1938 Hornchurch Urban District Council election =

1938 English local government election

- 4 April 1938

7 of 13 seats to the Hornchurch Urban District Council 11 seats needed for a majority
	First party	Second party
	LAB	RA
Party	Labour	Ratepayers
Seats before	9	8
Seats won	4	3
Seats after	10	9
Seat change	▲1	▲1
	Third party	Fourth party
	CON	IND
Party	Conservative	Independent
Seats before	1	1
Seats won	0	0
Seats after	1	0
Seat change	Steady	▼1

The 13th election to Hornchurch Urban District Council took place on 4 April 1938. The election was for 7 of 13 seats on the council.

== Background ==
In 1938 seven of the seats were up for re-election:

- Emerson Park, 1 seat (out of 3)
- Harold Wood, 1 seat (out of 2)
- Hornchurch Town, 1 seat (out of 4)
- North West Hornchurch, 2 seats (out of 5)
- Rainham, 1 seat (out of 2)
- Upminster, 1 seat (out of 3)

There were no elections in the Cranham or Thameside wards.

Councillors were elected for a three-year term due to end in 1941. However, due to the Second World War, and the provisions of the Local Elections and Register of Electors (Temporary Provisions) Acts 1939–1944 and the Representation of the People Act 1945, their terms were extended until the 1947 election.

== Results ==
The results were as follows:

=== Emerson Park ===
Emerson Park
Party	Candidate	Votes	%	±%
Ratepayers	Frances Sherring	918		
Labour	Caroline Stevens	899		
Turnout				
Ratepayers hold		Swing		

=== Harold Wood ===
Harold Wood
Party	Candidate	Votes	%	±%
Ratepayers	Alfred Salinger	597		
Labour	Henry Pingram	594		
Turnout				
Ratepayers gain from Independent		Swing		

=== Hornchurch Town ===
Hornchurch Town
Party	Candidate	Votes	%	±%
Labour	Willie Webb	1,115		
Ratepayers	Robert Beard (Note: Robert Beard was previously elected for a three-year term in 1935.)	924		
Labour gain from Ratepayers		Swing		

=== North West Hornchurch ===
North West Hornchurch
Party	Candidate	Votes	%	±%
Turnout				
Labour	Thomas Martin (Note: Thomas Martin was previously elected for a three-year term in 1935.)	2,107		
Labour	William Maunder (Note: William Maunder was previously elected for a three-year term in 1935.)	2,048		
Ratepayers	Wilson Edwards	1,032		
Ratepayers	Arthur Bragg	998		
Labour hold		Swing		
Labour hold		Swing		

=== Rainham ===
Rainham
Party	Candidate	Votes	%	±%
Labour	Alfred Holmes (Note: Alfred Holmes was previously elected for a three-year term in 1935.)	742		
Ratepayers	Edward Parkinson	465		
Turnout				
Labour hold		Swing		

=== Upminster ===
Upminster
Party	Candidate	Votes	%	±%
Ratepayers	W. Bunch (Note: W. Bunch was previously elected for a one-year term in 1937.)	Unopposed		
Ratepayers hold				
