= 1937 Hornchurch Urban District Council election =

1937 English local government election

- 5 April 1937

8 of 13 seats to the Hornchurch Urban District Council 11 seats needed for a majority
	First party	Second party
	LAB	RA
Party	Labour	Ratepayers
Seats before	8	8
Seats won	3	4
Seats after	9	8
Seat change	▲1	Steady
	Third party	Fourth party
	IND	CON
Party	Independent	Conservative
Seats before	2	New
Seats won	0	1
Seats after	1	1
Seat change	▼1	▲1

The 12th election to Hornchurch Urban District Council took place on 5 April 1937. The election was for 8 of 13 seats on the council.

== Background ==
In 1937 seven of the seats were up for re-election:

- Emerson Park, 1 seat (out of 3)
- Harold Wood, 1 seat (out of 2)
- Hornchurch Town, 1 seat (out of 4)
- North West Hornchurch, 2 seat (out of 5)
- Rainham, 1 seat (out of 2)
- Upminster, 2 seats (out of 3), one of them a by-election caused by the resignation of F. Farnan.

There were no elections in the Cranham or Thameside wards.

Councillors were elected for a three-year term due to end in 1940. However, due to the Second World War, and the provisions of the Local Elections and Register of Electors (Temporary Provisions) Acts 1939–1944 and the Representation of the People Act 1945, their terms were extended until the 1946 election.

== Results ==
The results were as follows:

=== Emerson Park ===
Emerson Park
Party	Candidate	Votes	%	±%
Ratepayers	E. Field	824		
Labour	R. Edwards	591		
Turnout				
Ratepayers hold		Swing		

=== Harold Wood ===
Harold Wood
Party	Candidate	Votes	%	±%
Conservative	R. Reynolds	552		
Labour	H. Pingrain	339		
Turnout				
Conservative gain from Ratepayers		Swing		

=== Hornchurch Town ===
Hornchurch Town
Party	Candidate	Votes	%	±%
Ratepayers	C. Josephs	798		
Labour	Willie Webb	672		
Turnout				
Ratepayers gain from Hornchurch Town Ward Association		Swing		

=== North West Hornchurch ===
North West Hornchurch
Party	Candidate	Votes	%	±%
Labour	J. Matthews (Note: J. Matthews was previously elected for a three-year term in 1934.)	1,808		
Labour	Mrs Williams	1,504		
Independent	J. Wren	1,406		
Turnout				
Labour hold		Swing		
Labour gain from Independent		Swing		

=== Rainham ===
Rainham
Party	Candidate	Votes	%	±%
Labour	T. Willoughby (Note: T. Willoughby was previously elected for a three-year term in 1934.)	586		
Independent	Mr. Parkinson	458		
Turnout				
Labour hold		Swing		

=== Upminster ===
In the normal cycle, one seat was due for election in 1937 for a three-year term. However, the resignation of F. Farnan meant there was an additional vacancy for the remaining year of his term. As both Herbert Perry and W. Bunch were elected unopposed, the usual practice of giving the longer term to the winner with the most votes was not possible. Therefore, on 12 April 1937, a special meeting was used to draw lots to decide the winner of the three-year term.

Upminster, 12 April 1937
Party	Candidate	Votes	%	±%
Ratepayers	Herbert Perry	1		
Ratepayers	W. Bunch	0		
Ratepayers hold				
Ratepayers hold				
