= 1930 Hornchurch Urban District Council election =

1930 English local government election

- 7 April 1930

5 of 13 seats to the Hornchurch Urban District Council 7 seats needed for a majority
	First party	Second party	Third party
	RA	LAB	IND
Party	Ratepayers	Labour	Independent
Seats before	9	2	2
Seats won	3	1	0
Seats after	8	3	2
Seat change	▼1	▲1	Steady

The fifth election to Hornchurch Urban District Council took place on 7 April 1930. The election was for 5 of 13 seats on the council.

== Background ==
In 1930 five of the seats were up for re-election:

- Hornchurch Village, 2 seats (out of 4)
- North West Hornchurch, 1 seat (out of 5)
- South Hornchurch, 2 seats (out of 2)

There were no elections in the Harold Wood ward.

== Results ==
The results were as follows:

=== Hornchurch Village ===
Hornchurch Village
Party	Candidate	Votes	%	±%
Ratepayers	Alexander Ferguson	937		
Ratepayers	Charles Parker	803		
Labour	Willie Webb	214		
Labour	Mrs. Tyrrell	193		
Independent	F. Standen	149		
Turnout				
Ratepayers hold		Swing		
Ratepayers hold		Swing		

=== North West Hornchurch ===
North West Hornchurch
Party	Candidate	Votes	%	±%
Ratepayers	Frederick Cole	929		
Labour	Mrs. Russell	441		
Independent	W. Edwards	178		
Turnout				
Ratepayers hold		Swing		

=== South Hornchurch ===
South Hornchurch
Party	Candidate	Votes	%	±%
Labour	Benjamin Tarr	201		
Ratepayers	E. Horsham	94		
Turnout				
Labour gain from Ratepayers		Swing		
