= 1929 Hornchurch Urban District Council election =

1929 UK local government election

- 25 March 1929

5 of 13 seats to the Hornchurch Urban District Council 7 seats needed for a majority
	First party	Second party	Third party
	RA	LAB	IND
Party	Ratepayers	Labour	Independent
Seats before	9	2	2
Seats won	2	2	1
Seats after	9	2	2
Seat change	Steady	Steady	Steady

The fourth election to Hornchurch Urban District Council took place on 25 March 1929, for 5 of 13 council seats.

== Background ==
In 1929 five of the seats were up for reelection:

- Harold Wood, 1 seat (out of 2)
- Hornchurch Village, 1 seat (out of 4)
- North West Hornchurch, 2 seats (out of 5)
- South Hornchurch, 1 seat (out of 1)

All the winning candidates were the 'retiring' councillors from previous elections. (Note: Davis (elected 1927), Bratchell (1926), Lambert (1926) and Stanton (1927) sought reelection.) Stanton was the only nomination for South Hornchurch and was therefore elected unopposed.

== Results ==
Polling took place on 25 March 1929. The results were as follows:

=== Harold Wood ===
Harold Wood
Party	Candidate	Votes	%	±%
Independent	F. Davis (Note: F. Davis was previously elected for a two-year term in 1927.)			
Independent	R. Russell			
Turnout				
Independent hold		Swing		

=== Hornchurch Village ===
Hornchurch Village
Party	Candidate	Votes	%	±%
Ratepayers	Edgar Bratchell (Note: Edgar Bratchell was previously elected for a three-year term in 1926.)			
Labour	Benjamin Tarr			
Turnout				
Ratepayers hold		Swing		

=== North West Hornchurch ===
North West Hornchurch
Party	Candidate	Votes	%	±%
Labour	Edwin Lambert (Note: Edwin Lambert was previously elected for a three-year term in 1926.)			
Ratepayers	E. Legg			
Independent	H. Lomas			
Labour	J. W. Matthews			
Ratepayers	J. Matthews			
Turnout				
Labour hold		Swing		
Ratepayers hold		Swing		

=== South Hornchurch ===
South Hornchurch
Party	Candidate	Votes	%
Labour	W. Stanton (Note: W. Stanton was previously elected for a two-year term in 1927.)	Unopposed	
Labour hold			
