= Langtons =

House in Hornchurch, London, England

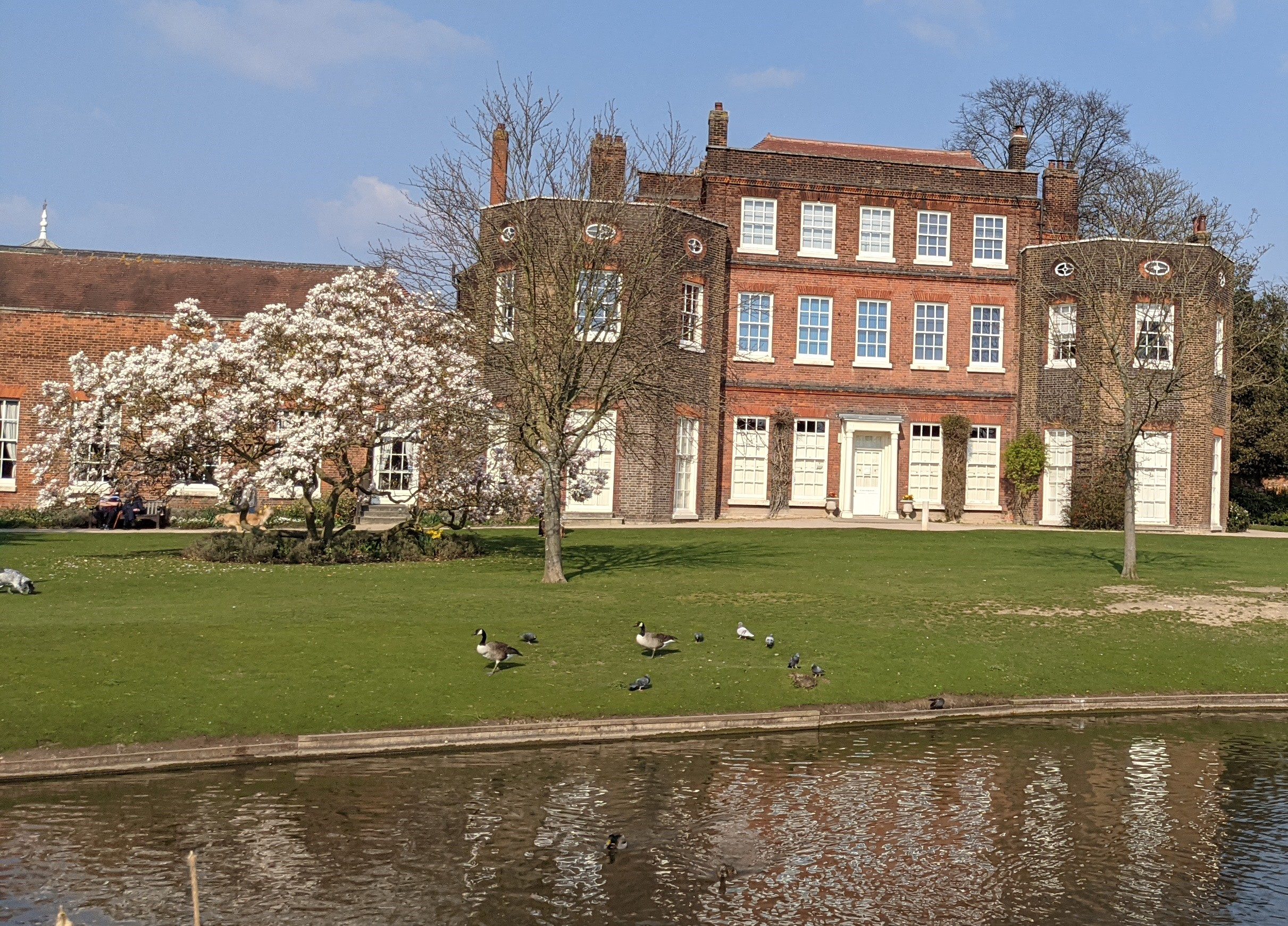
- Langtons House from Langtons Gardens

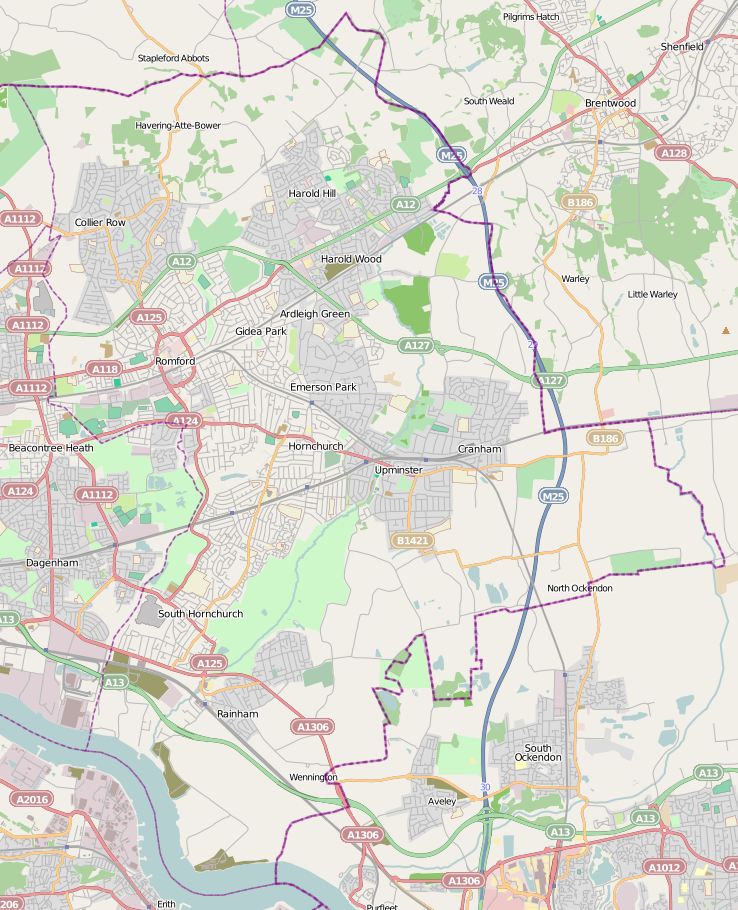
- Location within London Borough of Havering

General information
- Location: Billet Lane, Hornchurch, Havering, London, England
- Coordinates: 51°33′56″N 0°13′2″E
- Current tenants: Havering register office
- Renovated: 1797, 1929
- Owner: Havering London Borough Council

Langtons House and Langtons Gardens are a grade II listed 18th century house and landscaped gardens located in Hornchurch, in the London Borough of Havering, Greater London. The house and gardens became local authority property in 1929 and are currently used as the borough register office and a public park. Langtons House was used as the council offices of Hornchurch Urban District Council from 1929 to 1965.

== History ==
The house, built on the foundations of an older house in the early 18th century, stands in a picturesque landscaped garden with a lake, orangery, bath house and a gazebo, all dating from the end of the 18th century, when Hornchurch was a rural settlement. In 1776 Langtons and considerable property in Essex was owned by John Mayor a brewer who became MP for Abingdon and established HM Stationery Office. The house was purchased in 1797 by John Massu, whose family, originally Huguenot refugees, had become wealthy silk merchants in the City of London. He set about modernising Langtons, to which he added the two-storey wings that project on the south front.

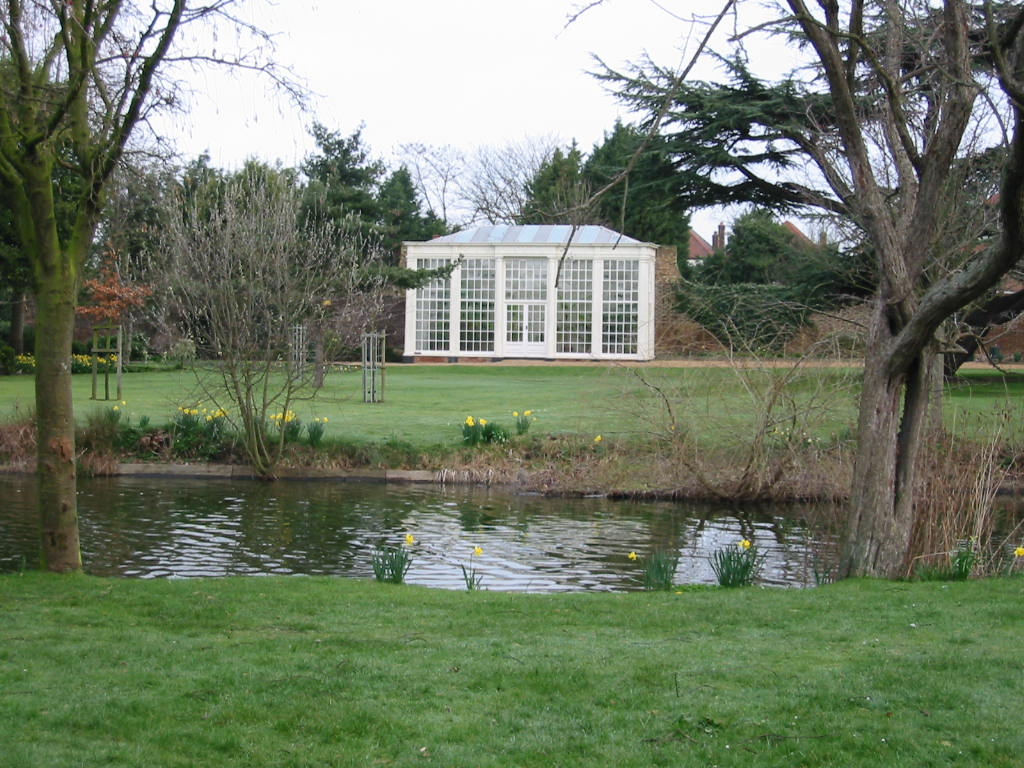
Repton's gardens and the fully glazed orangery

The grounds were landscaped according to the plans of Humphrey Repton. He created the serpentine pond with the bathhouse and gazebo and planted horse chestnuts to mask or frame the mid-18th century stables, to which he added an octagonal cupola. A shrubbery walk with serpentining paths was planted east of the house and a balancing shrubbery belt to the west is probably part of Repton's plan; the Cedar of Lebanon was planted as a central feature of the lawn. By 1805 the gardens were sufficiently advanced to be illustrated in Peacock's Polite Repository.

Langtons was given to Hornchurch Urban District Council by Varco Williams and his daughter in 1929, under the condition that the building must be kept as it was and used for council purposes and that the six acres (24,000 m^{2}) of grounds remain open to the public. The gardens, one of the surviving historic landscapes serve as one of the parks and open spaces in Havering. The Fielders Sports Ground, north of the site, was once also part of the gardens and was used as a venue for first-class cricket. The building housed the council offices until the council was abolished in 1965 and Havering London Borough Council, based in Romford, was created.

In 2016 the gardens were extensively restored adding many new features such as a Victorian greenhouse, ornamental bridge, entrance pillars, cobbled stable yard and new tea room.

== Havering register office ==
Langtons House is used as a register office and function rooms, and has become a popular venue for weddings. Due to an administration error it was found to be unlicensed from October 2004 to March 2005 with 193 marriages affected. Despite the error, all were later found by the High Court to be legally valid.
