= 1936 Hornchurch Urban District Council election =

1936 UK local government election

- 6 April 1936

7 of 21 seats to the Hornchurch Urban District Council 11 seats needed for a majority
	First party	Second party
	RA	LAB
Party	Ratepayers	Labour
Seats before	10	6
Seats won	4	3
Seats after	8	8
Seat change	▼2	▲2
	Third party	Fourth party
	IND	TWA
Party	Independent	Town Ward Association
Seats before	2	1
Seats won	0	0
Seats after	2	1
Seat change	Steady	Steady

The 11th election to Hornchurch Urban District Council took place on 6 April 1936, for 7 of 21 council seats.

== Background ==
In 1936 seven of the seats were up for re-election:

- Cranham, 1 seat (out of 1)
- Emerson Park, 1 seat (out of 3)
- Hornchurch Town, 2 seats (out of 4)
- North West Hornchurch, 1 seat (out of 5)
- Thameside, 1 seat (out of 1)
- Upminster, 1 seat (out of 3)

There were no elections in the Harold Wood or Rainham wards. On 1 April 1936, Hornchurch Urban District expanded to take in part of North Ockendon, with the area added to Cranham civil parish and Cranham ward.

== Results ==
The results were as follows:

=== Cranham ===
Cranham
Party	Candidate	Votes	%	±%
Ratepayers	Hereward Wake (Note: Hereward Wake was previously elected for a two-year term in 1934.)	400		
Labour	Willie Webb	115		
Turnout				
Ratepayers hold		Swing		

=== Emerson Park ===
Emerson Park
Party	Candidate	Votes	%	±%
Ratepayers	Charles Parker (Note: Charles Parker was previously elected for Hornchurch Village in 1933.)	681		
Labour	Alfred Nobbs	498		
Turnout				
Ratepayers hold		Swing		

=== Hornchurch Town ===
Hornchurch Town
Party	Candidate	Votes	%	±%
Ratepayers	Alexander Ferguson (Note: Alexander Ferguson was previously elected for Hornchurch Village in 1933.)	592		
Labour	Annie King	517		
Independent	Alexander Champion	475		
Labour	Arthur Cox	466		
Ratepayers	William Govey	402		
Ratepayers	Henry Burgin	377		
Turnout				
Ratepayers hold		Swing		
Labour gain from Ratepayers		Swing		

=== North West Hornchurch ===
North West Hornchurch
Party	Candidate	Votes	%	±%
Labour	Arthur Twigger	1,393		
Ratepayers	Samuel Youngs	968		
Independent	Herbert Clark	243		
Turnout				
Labour gain from Ratepayers		Swing		

=== Thameside ===
Thameside
Party	Candidate	Votes	%	±%
Labour	Benjamin Tarr (Note: Benjamin Tarr was previously elected for South Hornchurch in 1933.)	Unopposed		
Labour hold				

=== Upminster ===
Upminster
Party	Candidate	Votes	%	±%
Ratepayers	David Ramsay (Note: David Ramsay was previously elected for a two-year term in 1934.)	1,319		
Labour	Sidney Barnes	222		
Turnout				
Ratepayers hold		Swing		
