= Upminster Windmill =

Windmill in Upminster, east London, England

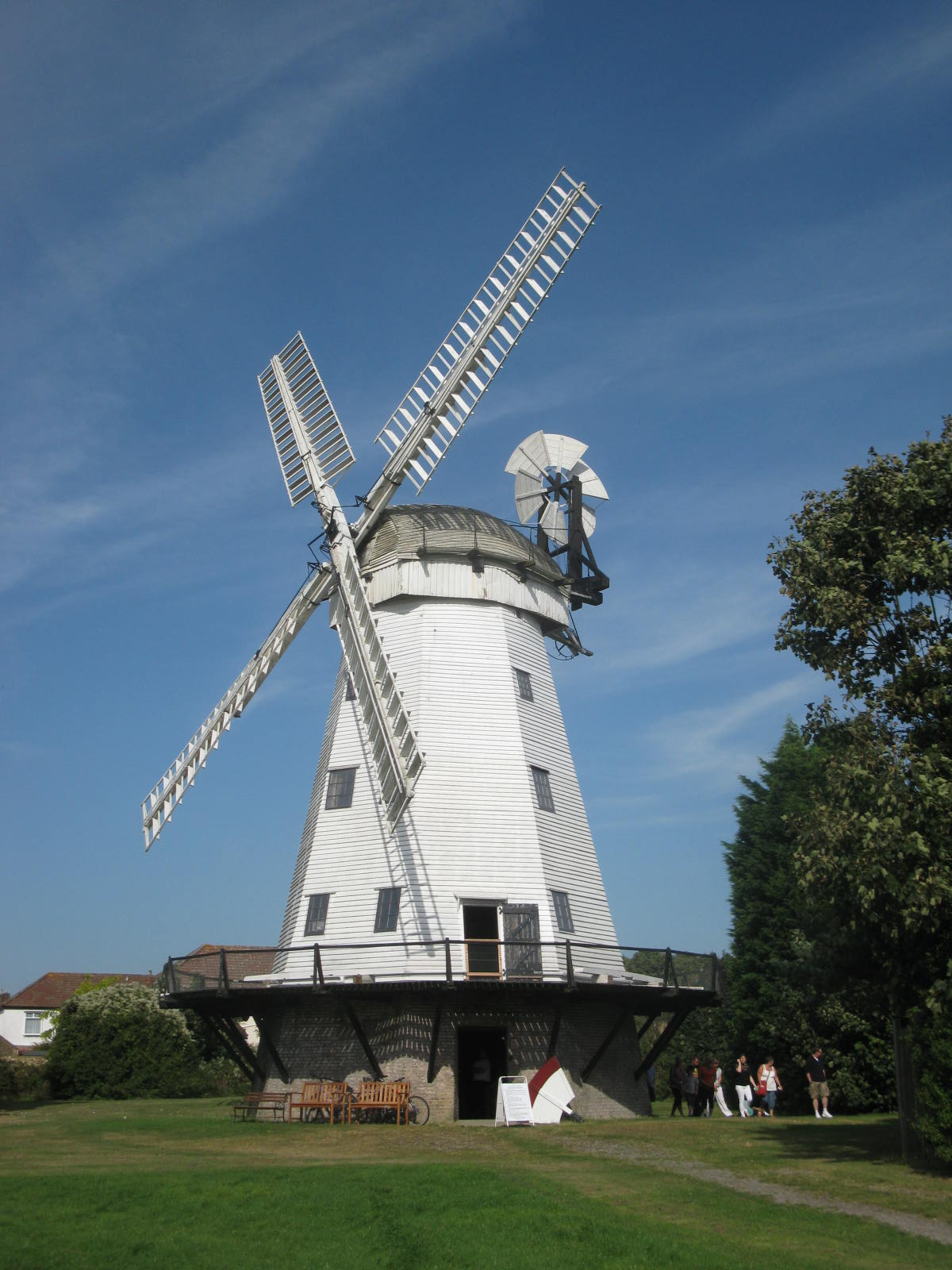
- The mill in September 2012.

Origin
- Mill name: Abraham's Mill; Upminster Mill
- Grid reference: TQ 557 867
- Coordinates: 51.558°N 0.2451°E
- Operator(s): Friends of Upminster Windmill
- Year built: 1803

Information
- Purpose: Corn mill
- Type: Smock mill
- Storeys: Four-storey smock
- Base storeys: Single-storey base
- Smock sides: Eight sides
- No. of sails: Four sails
- Type of sails: Patent sails
- Windshaft: cast iron
- Winding: Fantail
- Fantail blades: Six blades
- Auxiliary power: steam engine
- No. of pairs of millstones: Four pairs
- Size of millstones: Two pairs 4 feet 6 inches (1.37 m) diameter Two pairs 4 feet 0 inches (1.22 m) diameter.

Upminster Windmill is a Grade II* listed smock mill located in Upminster in the London Borough of Havering, England. It was formerly known as Abraham's Mill and was in Essex when built. Between 2016 and 2023 the mill was restored to working order and a visitor centre was constructed. The mill and visitor centre are open to the public at selected times.

== History ==
Although there had been a windmill in Upminster since at least 1768, this mill was built for James Nokes of Hunt's Farm in Corbets Tey Road in 1803 on land transferred from Bridge House Farm which was owned by his brother William. It had four Common sails and drove three pairs of millstones. A steam engine was added early in 1811 driving two pairs of millstones, an action which increased the rateable value of the mill from £30 to £77. A fourth pair of millstones was added to the mill. James Nokes died in 1838 and the mill passed to his son Thomas. A fifth pair of millstones had been added by 1849 when Thomas Nokes was bankrupt. By 1856 the mill was driving six pairs of millstones by wind and steam. Thomas Abraham purchased the mill in 1857, having previously been in the employ of Nokes at both West Thurrock windmill and Upminster. He had also been in business at a steam mill in Navestock for the previous two years. In 1876, the upright shaft was broken in an accident at the mill. It was repaired with a cast-iron coupling.

Thomas Abraham died in 1882 and the mill passed to John Arkell Abraham. In 1889 the mill was struck by lightning and on 5 January 1900 the windshaft snapped at the neck and the sails crashed to the ground. A windshaft from a post mill near Maldon was fitted along with four new sails. After the death of John Arkell Abraham, the mill passed to his nephews Thomas, Alfred and Clement. In 1927 a stock was replaced and the fantail repaired. The mill last worked commercially in 1934 and was purchased for £3,400 by W H Simmonds. The steam-driven machinery was sold and the associated outbuildings decayed and were eventually demolished. The mill was subsequently purchased by Essex County Council in the late 1930s, and was listed in 1955

On 22 June 2004, the Upminster Windmill Preservation Trust were granted a 35-year lease on the mill. On 18 January 2007, the windmill suffered damage in extremely high winds. The stock sustained damage as did the sail, but there was little other damage to the mill. Two new sails were fitted by Vincent Pargeter in August 2008.

== Description ==
The mill has a four-storey smock on a single-storey brick base. There is a stage at first-floor level. It has a boat-shaped cap with a gallery, winded by a six-bladed fantail. Four Patent sails are carried on a cast-iron windshaft. The mill drives four pairs of millstones by wind. The mill is 52 feet (15.85 m) in height to the top of the cap.

=== Base ===
The brick base is 24 feet 9 inches (7.54 m) across the flats and 9 feet 6 inches (2.90 m) high. The brickwork is 34 inches (860 mm) thick at ground level, diminishing to 18 inches (460 mm) at the top.

=== Smock ===
The four-storey smock has cant posts of 13 inches (330 mm) by 12 inches (305 mm) section, 34 feet (10.36 m) long. the sills are 12 inches (300 mm) by 6 inches (150 mm) in section, 18 feet 4 inches (5.59 m) long. The spout floor is 27 feet 9 inches (8.46 m) across the flats, the stone floor is 24 feet (7.32 m) across the flats and the top of the smock tower is 14 feet (4.27 m) diameter at the curb. The main floor beams are 12 inches (300 mm) square at all levels except the dust floor. The main transoms are 8 inches (200 mm) by 7 inches (180 mm) in section at all levels.

=== Cap and fantail ===
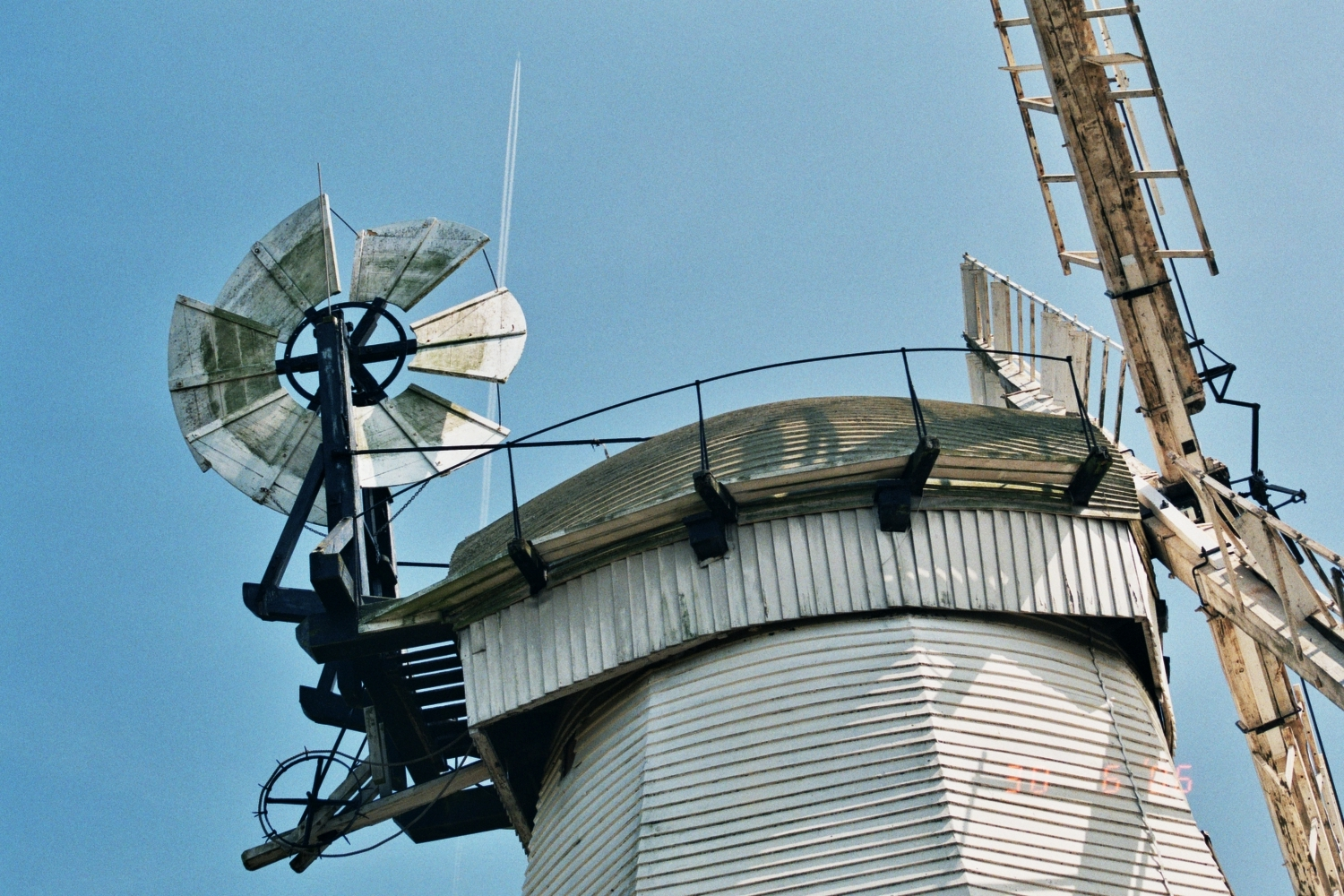
The cap, fantail and sails in June 2006.

The boat-shaped cap is 17 feet 6 inches (5.33 m) by 16 feet 10 inches (5.13 m) in plan and 8 feet 9 inches (2.67 m) high. The main sheer beams are 12 inches (300 mm) square, on 10 feet 10 inches (3.30 m) centres, with the weatherbeam of 18 inches (460 mm) by 12 inches (300 mm) section at the centre and 13 inches (330 mm) square at the ends. The cap is thought to be the work of the millwright William Bear of Ballingdon and is unusual in having an external gallery. The fantail consists of six wooden vanes set at right-angles to the sails, and has the year 1799 carved on the horizontal wooden beam beneath it.

=== Sails and windshaft ===
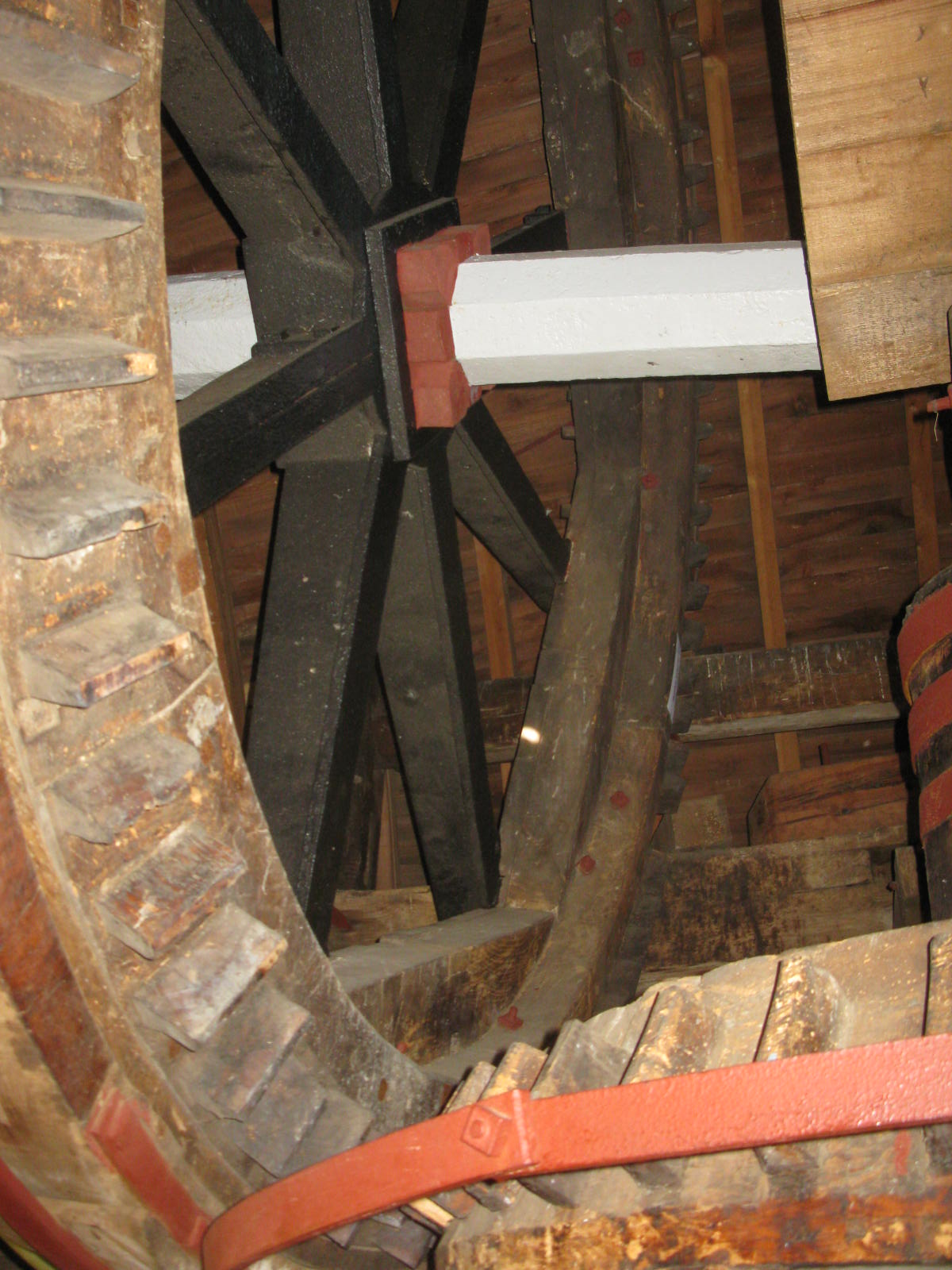
The Brake Wheel and wallower

The octagonal cast-iron windshaft has two square sections to take a head wheel and tail wheel as was its intended purpose in a post mill, and was moved to Upminster from a post mill near Maldon in 1899 to replace one broken during a storm. It carries a 10-foot-4-inch-diameter (3.1 m) composite brake wheel with eight cast-iron arms and six wooden cants. The brake wheel has 78 cogs. The neck bearing of the windshaft is a roller bearing, fitted after the mill ceased working commercially.

Originally Upminster windmill had canvas sails, but the sails on the mill when it ceased working commercially were four double patent sails. They were carried on two stocks 46 feet (14.02 m) long, 12 inches (300 mm) square at the centre, tapering to 9 inches (230 mm) by 6 inches (150 mm) at the ends. The sails were 70 feet (21.34 m) in span, and tapered from 7 feet (2.13 m) wide at the heel to 6 feet 6 inches (1.98 m) at the tip. Each sail had twelve bays with three shutters per bay, giving a total of 288 shutters, each carved with a number in Roman numerals to indicate its location. The weather on the sails was 23° at the heel and almost 0° at the tip.

=== Machinery ===
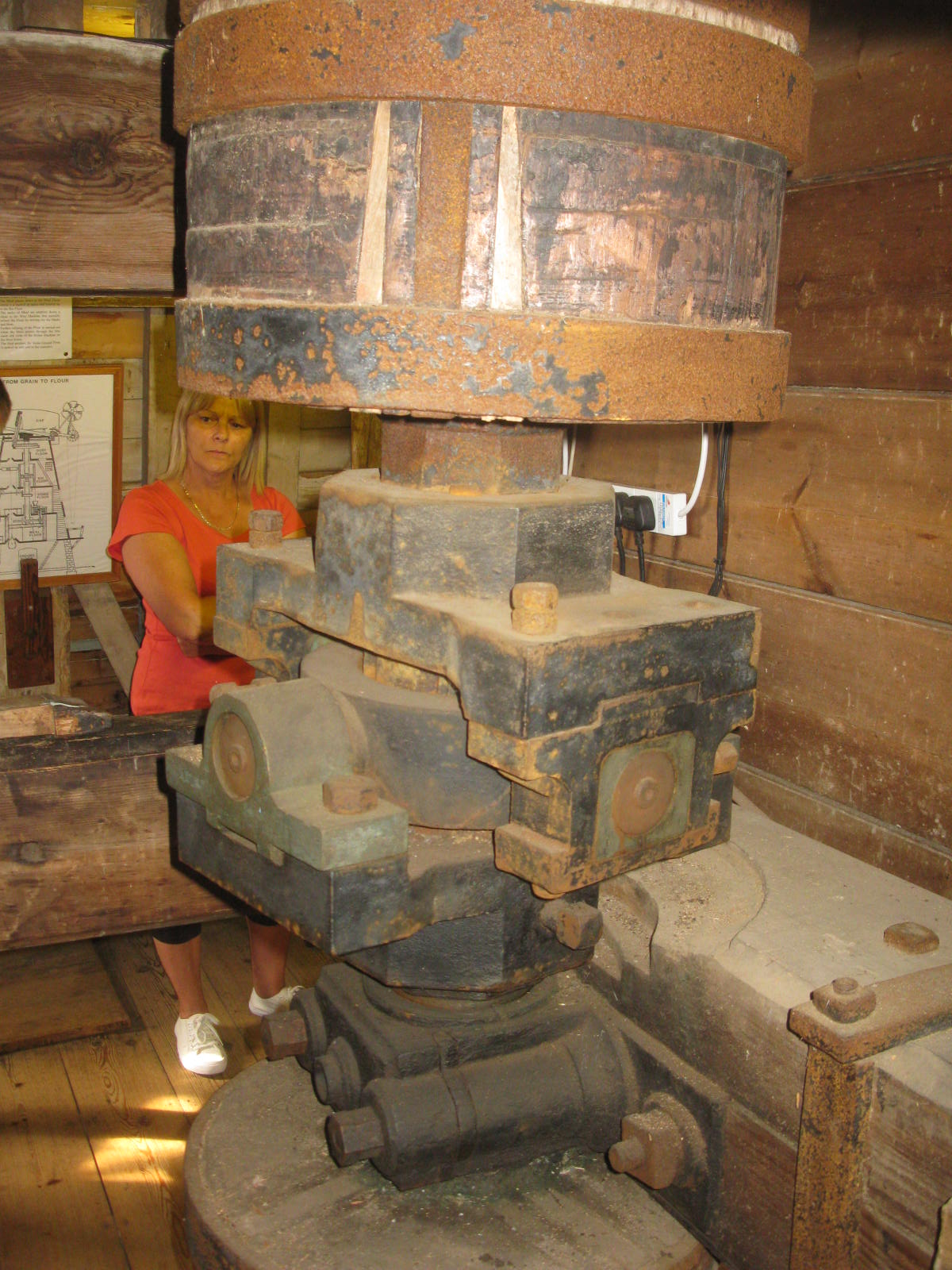
The universal joint in the upright shaft

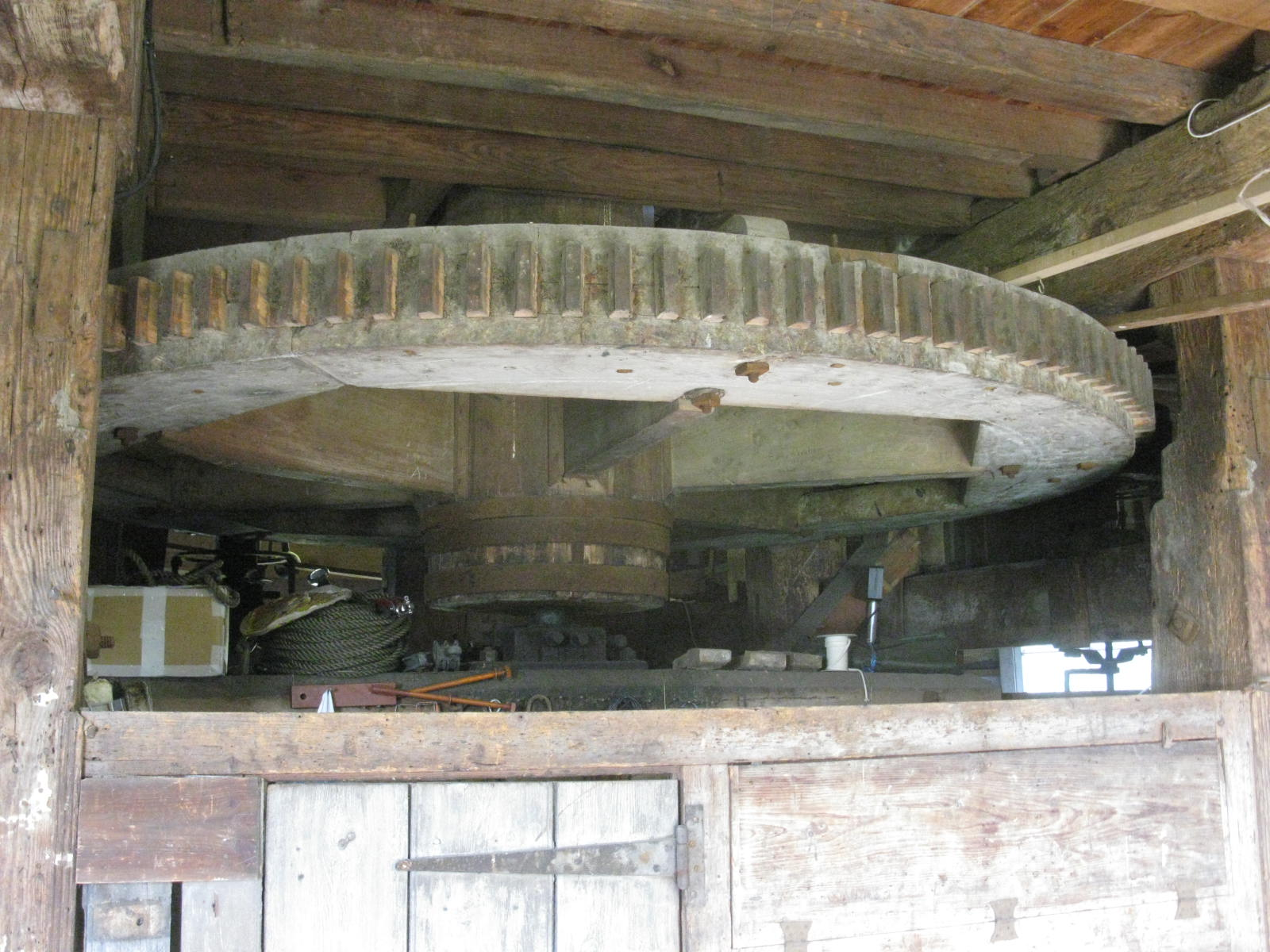
The compass arm great spur wheel

The upright shaft is wooden, in two sections for reasons noted above. It is twelve sided, 18 inches (460 mm) across the flats and 30 feet 4 inches (9.25 m) long in total. The wallower is of compass arm construction, 5 feet 4 inches (1.6 m) in diameter with 43 cogs. At the bottom of the upright shaft, the 10-foot-diameter (3.0 m) compass arm great spur wheel has 126 cogs. It drives four pairs of underdrift millstones via stone nuts with 24 cogs.

The millstones are three pairs of French Burr stones and one pair of Peak stones. Two pairs of the French Burr stones are 4 feet 6 inches (1.37 m) in diameter, and the other two pairs of millstones are 4 feet (1.22 m) in diameter.

=== Steam engine ===
The steam engine was located in a brick building built against the north-east side of the windmill, and drove two pairs of millstones, a centrifugal governor, and a sack hoist. The steam-driven millstones were located on two levels and driven by a 2 1/2-inch-square (64 mm) shaft of 50 feet (15.24 m) length, those on the upper floor being driven by a cast-iron bevel wheel with wooden cog inserts. It was also able to work various dressing machines in the windmill, but not the wind-driven stones. There is some difference over the exact type of engine, it being variously described as a grasshopper engine built by Napiers, and a Cornish boiler by Davey Paxman & Co. Both sources agree that the engine had formerly been used in a Thames steamboat. The steam engine itself was removed in 1940 and taken to South West Essex Technical College in Walthamstow, while the building and remaining contents were removed in 1960, with two of the millstones remaining at the windmill entrance.

== Millers ==
- James Nokes 1803–1838
- Thomas Nokes 1838–1849
- Thomas Abraham 1857–1882
- John Arkell Abraham 1882–1912
- Thomas, Alfred and Clement Abraham 1912–1934

References for above:-

== Location ==
The mill is located in a small open space maintained by Havering Council, known as Windmill Field on St Mary's Lane. The nearest tube stations are Upminster Bridge tube station and Upminster station. Views from the top of the windmill include Canary Wharf and the transmitter at Crystal Palace.
