= Haynes Park (London) =

Public park in Hornchurch, London

- Interactive map of Haynes Park
- Type: Public park
- Coordinates: 51.5769°N 0.215°E
- Area: 11 hectares (27 acres)
- Operator: Havering London Borough Council
- Open: All year

Haynes Park is a public park in Hornchurch in the London Borough of Havering. It is owned and managed by Havering London Borough Council and has Green Flag Award status.

== History ==
Haynes Park was purchased by Hornchurch Urban District Council.

== Features ==
Haynes Park is the location of Haynes Park Bowling Club.

The park contains a footpath right-of-way between Slewins Lane and Haynes Road.

The Ravensbourne forms much of the western boundary.

== Management ==
The park is owned and managed by Havering London Borough Council. The park has Green Flag Award status.
