= Romford Rural District =

Former local government area in the UK

Coordinates: 51.56°N 0.22°E

- Interactive map of 1911 boundaries
- Area
  - 1911: 29,720 acres (120.3 km^{2})
  - 1921: 29,720 acres (120.3 km^{2})
  - 1931: 16,376 acres (66.27 km^{2})
- Population
  - 1911: 25,356
  - 1921: 29,485
  - 1931: 15,107
- Density
  - 1911: 0.8/acre
  - 1921: 1/acre
  - 1931: 0.9/acre
- History
  - Origin: Romford Rural Sanitary District
  - Created: 1894
  - Abolished: 1934
  - Succeeded by: Brentwood Urban District; Dagenham Urban District; Hornchurch Urban District; Romford Urban District
- Status: Rural district
- Government: Romford Rural District Council
  - HQ: South Street, Romford
- Subdivisions
  - Type: Parishes
  - Units: Cranham; Dagenham (1894–1926); Great Warley; Havering-atte-Bower; Hornchurch (1894–1926); Noak Hill; Rainham; Romford Rural (1894–1900); Upminster; Wennington

Romford Rural District was a local government district in southwest Essex, England from 1894 to 1934. It surrounded, but did not include, Romford which formed a separate urban district. During the life of the district the area changed in use from rural farm land to sprawling London suburb and in 1926 much of it was removed to form new urban districts.

== Precursors ==
The setting up of rural local government districts had its origins in the union of parishes following the Poor Law Amendment Act 1834. Romford Poor Law Union was created in 1836. It consisted of the parishes of Barking, Cranham, Dagenham, Great Warley, Havering atte Bower, Hornchurch, Rainham, Romford, Upminster and Wennington. In 1837 an identical area became Romford Registration District for the purposes of the Births and Deaths Registration Act 1836. The Poor Law union area was used again for the purposes of the Public Health Act 1875 and Romford Rural Sanitary District was created in 1875. For the purposes of the rural sanitary district (but not the Poor Law union or registration district) areas that formed local boards were removed from the area. This occurred for Barking Town (1882), Ilford (1890) and Romford (1851).

== Creation ==
It was created a rural district in 1894 by the Local Government Act 1894, based on the Romford rural sanitary district. In 1911 the rural district had a combined area of 29,720 acres (120 km^{2}) and consisted of the following parishes:

1. Noak Hill
2. Havering-atte-Bower
3. Dagenham
4. Great Warley
5. Hornchurch
6. Upminster
7. Cranham
8. Rainham
9. Wennington
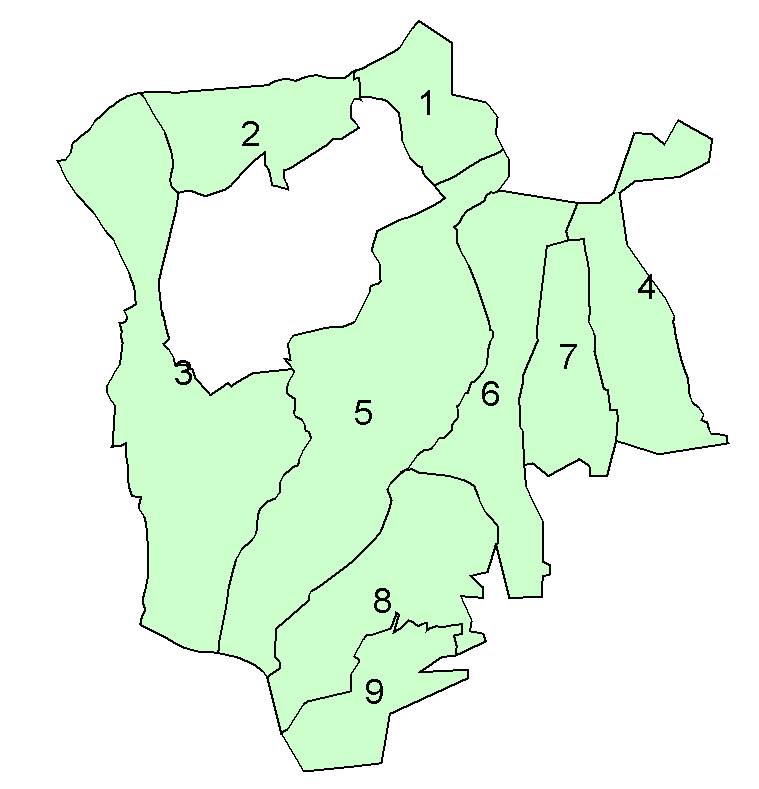

=== Romford Rural parish ===
Before 1894 the urban part of Romford parish corresponding to the town was covered a local board of health. Under the 1894 legislation the parish was split with the former board of health district becoming the Romford Urban parish in Romford Urban District and the remainder formed the Romford Rural parish within the larger rural district. A parish council of nine members was formed for Romford Rural parish. The arrangement did not last and in October 1896 the parish council resolved to seek amalgamation with Romford Urban. This was reciprocated by December 1898. In 1900 the two parishes were abolished and their former area used to create a Romford parish which constituted the enlarged Romford Urban District.

== Dagenham and Hornchurch ==
In 1925 Dagenham and Hornchurch parish councils applied for conversion to urban districts. Dagenham included much of the vast Becontree estate and had experienced a rapid rise in population. Hornchurch was undergoing a lot of suburban house building. The Romford Rural District Council objected to both applications. The Hornchurch Ratepayers' Association opposed Hornchurch gaining urban powers. In 1926 the parish of Hornchurch was removed to form Hornchurch Urban District and the parish of Dagenham was removed to form Dagenham Urban District.

== Abolition ==
In 1934 the district was abolished and the remaining parishes transferred to neighbouring districts:

Parish	Transferred to
1. Noak Hill	Romford Urban District (3,687 acres)
2. Havering-atte-Bower	Romford Urban District (3,687 acres)
3. Great Warley	split with most to Hornchurch Urban District (7,141 acres) and part to Brentwood Urban District (1,002 acres)
4. Upminster	split with most to Hornchurch Urban District (7,141 acres) and part to Brentwood Urban District (1,002 acres)
5. Cranham	split with most to Hornchurch Urban District (7,141 acres) and part to Brentwood Urban District (1,002 acres)
6. Rainham	Hornchurch Urban District (4,546 acres)
7. Wennington	Hornchurch Urban District (4,546 acres)

The area today forms parts of the London Borough of Havering and the London Borough of Barking and Dagenham in Greater London. A boundary change in 1993 transferred the remaining parts of Great Warley to the Brentwood Borough of Essex.
