= 1926 Hornchurch Urban District Council election =

1926 UK local government election

- 26 March 1926

All 13 seats to the Hornchurch Urban District Council 7 seats needed for a majority
| | First party | Second party | Third party |
|---|---|---|---|
| | RA | LAB | IND |
| Party | Ratepayers | Labour | Independent |
| Seats won | 6 | 4 | 3 |
| Seats after | 6 | 4 | 3 |

The first election to Hornchurch Urban District Council took place on 26 March 1926, ahead of the creation of the new urban district on 1 April 1926.

== Background ==
The wards of the previous parish council were used for the new urban district, electing the same number of 13 councillors as the last parish council election in 1925. The number of councillors elected for each ward were:

- Harold Wood, 2 seats
- Hornchurch Village, 4 seats
- North West Hornchurch, 5 seats
- South Hornchurch, 2 seats

Nominations closed on 12 March 1926 and polling took place on 26 March 1926.

== Results ==
The results were as follows:

=== Harold Wood ===
Harold Wood (2)
| Party | Candidate | Votes | % | ±% |
|---|---|---|---|---|
| Independent | G. Matthews | 283 | | |
| Independent | Henry Ayres | 278 | | |
| Ratepayers | H. Powell | 48 | | |
| Turnout | | | | |
| Independent win (new seat) | | | | |
| Independent win (new seat) | | | | |

G. Matthews was elected for a three-year term but retired early in 1927.

=== Hornchurch Village ===
Hornchurch Village (4)
| Party | Candidate | Votes | % | ±% |
|---|---|---|---|---|
| Ratepayers | Edgar Bratchell | 759 | | |
| Ratepayers | Charles Fielder | 708 | | |
| Independent | Robert Beard | 695 | | |
| Ratepayers | R. Banks-Martin | 622 | | |
| Independent | A. Ferguson | 587 | | |
| Ratepayers | F. Bull | 496 | | |
| Labour | W. Chippingdale | 241 | | |
| Labour | E. Parr | 239 | | |
| Labour | Willie Webb | 218 | | |
| Labour | G. Pratt | 179 | | |
| Turnout | | | | |
| Ratepayers win (new seat) | | | | |
| Ratepayers win (new seat) | | | | |
| Independent win (new seat) | | | | |
| Ratepayers win (new seat) | | | | |

=== North West Hornchurch ===
North West Hornchurch (5)
| Party | Candidate | Votes | % | ±% |
|---|---|---|---|---|
| Labour | Edwin Lambert | 626 | | |
| Ratepayers | E. Legg | 564 | | |
| Labour | S. Hawkins | 526 | | |
| Labour | S. Hawkins | 496 | | |
| Labour | J. Matthews | 492 | | |
| Ratepayers | Frederick Cole | 479 | | |
| Ratepayers | R. Bloomfield | 468 | | |
| Ratepayers | Edith Field | 459 | | |
| Ratepayers | F. Moss | 453 | | |
| Labour | W. Stanton | 452 | | |
| Independent | H. Finch | 145 | | |
| Turnout | | | | |
| Labour win (new seat) | | | | |
| Ratepayers win (new seat) | | | | |
| Labour win (new seat) | | | | |
| Labour win (new seat) | | | | |
| Labour win (new seat) | | | | |

=== South Hornchurch ===
South Hornchurch (2)
| Party | Candidate | Votes | % | ±% |
|---|---|---|---|---|
| Ratepayers | E. Poole | 192 | | |
| Ratepayers | W. Goodchild | 181 | | |
| Labour | W. Edmunds | 92 | | |
| Labour | Benjamin Tarr | 86 | | |
| Turnout | | | | |
| Ratepayers win (new seat) | | | | |
| Ratepayers win (new seat) | | | | |

E. Poole was elected for a three-year term but retired early in 1927.
