= Hylands Park (London) =

Park in the London Borough of Havering, England

- Interactive map of Hylands Park
- Type: Public park
- Coordinates: 51.5709°N 0.2005°E
- Area: 4.6 hectares (11 acres)
- Opened: 1 June 1929
- Operator: Havering London Borough Council
- Open: All year

Hylands Park is a public park in the London Borough of Havering in northwest Hornchurch, near to Romford. It is owned and managed by Havering London Borough Council and has Green Flag Award status.

There was a Hylands ward of the London Borough of Havering from 1965 to 2022. The ward was replaced by Hylands and Harrow Lodge.

== History ==
The land was purchased in 1920 by the owners of the Oak Public House in Victoria Road, Romford. In 1925 a trotting track was laid out and a race meeting was held.

Hornchurch Urban District Council was established in 1926 and in 1927 they purchased the land, to be laid out as public park. The park was formally opened on Saturday 1 June 1929.

In October 1940 a Spitfire piloted by John McAdam from RAF Hornchurch narrowly avoided crashing in the crowded park, by crash landing in a gap between two houses.

== Features ==
The former trotting track has been converted to a large oval path, which encircles cricket and football pitches. The entrance to Osborne Road features stone and wrought iron gates that were transferred from nearby Grey Towers, that was demolished in 1931. There is a rose garden.

== Management ==
The park is owned and managed by Havering London Borough Council and has Green Flag Award status.
