= Hornchurch Urban District =

Former local government area in the UK

Hornchurch
- Urban district
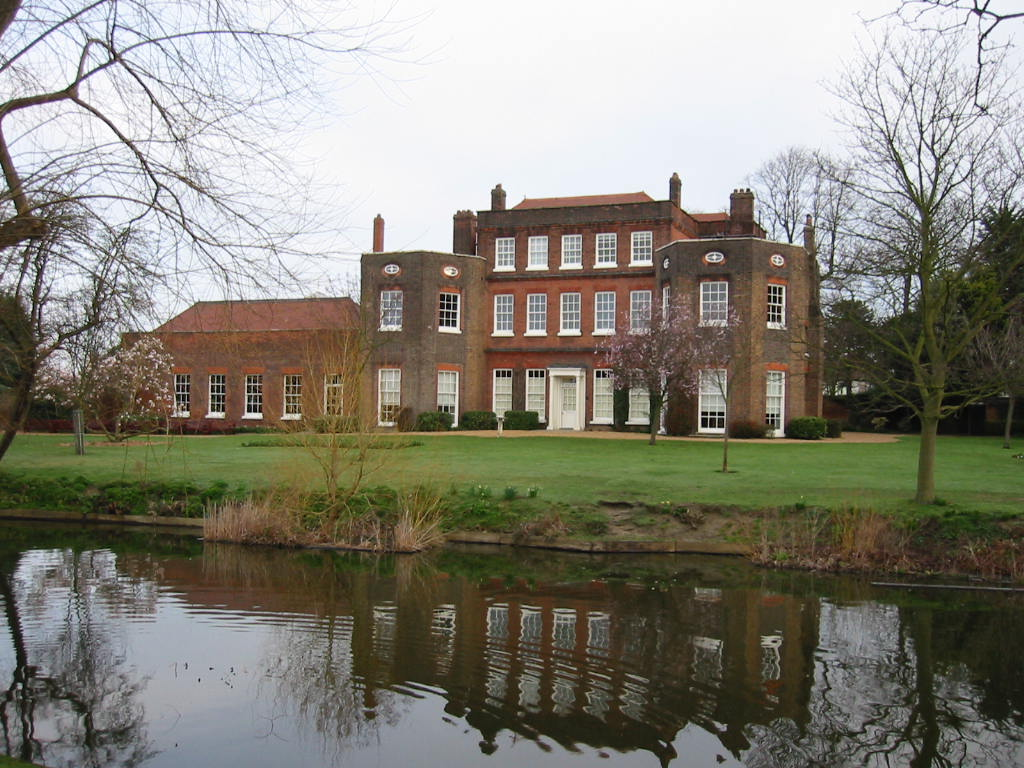
- Langtons House was used as the council offices from 1929.

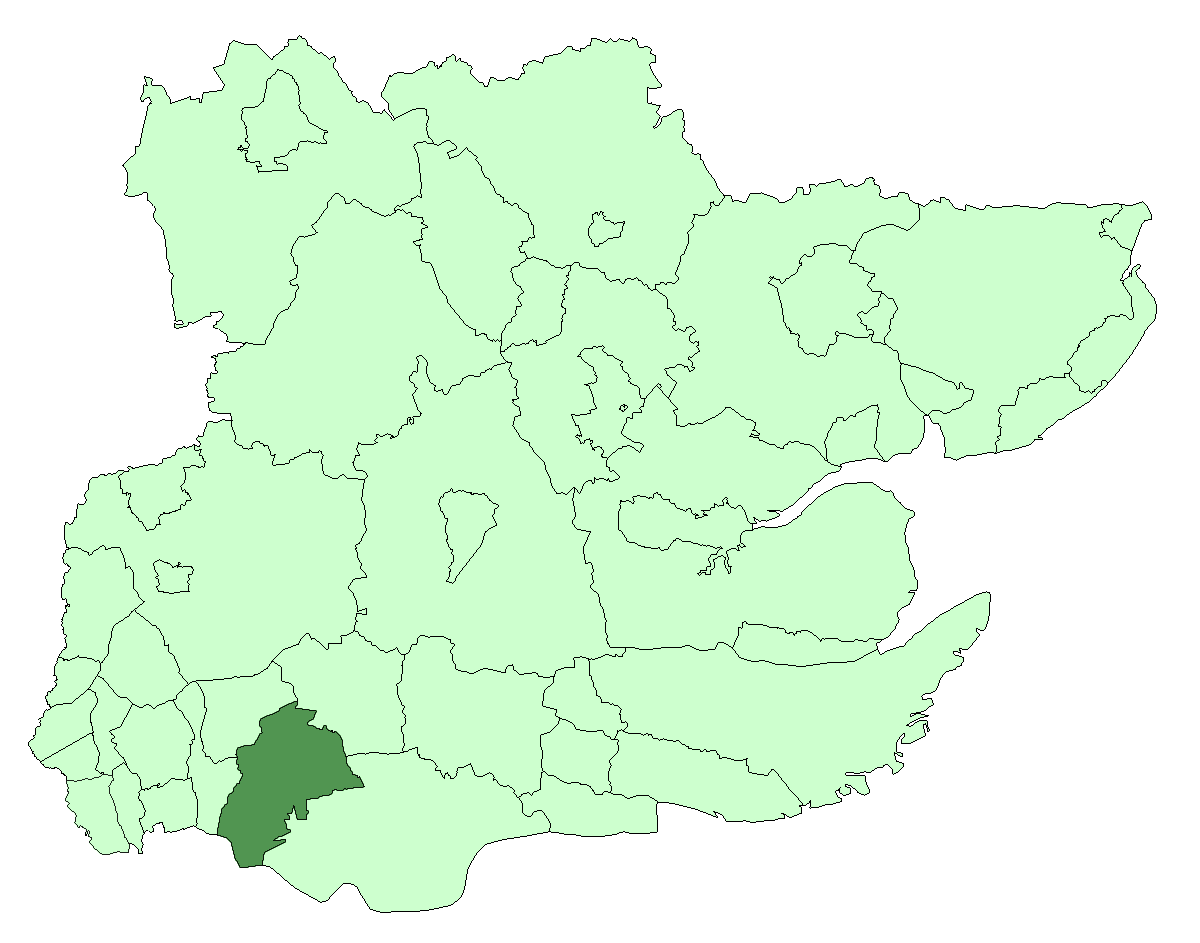
- Hornchurch within Essex in 1961
- Area
  - 1931: 6,783 acres (27.4 km^{2})
  - 1961: 19,768 acres (80.0 km^{2})
  - Coordinates: 51.566°N 0.217°E
- Area transferred
  - 1934: All of Rainham and Wennington and parts of Cranham, Great Warley and Upminster from Romford Rural District
  - 1936: Part of North Ockendon from Orsett Rural District
- Population
  - 1931: 28,417
  - 1961: 131,014
- Density
  - 1931: 4/acre
  - 1961: 6.6/acre
- History
  - Origin: Hornchurch civil parish
  - Created: 1926
  - Abolished: 1965
  - Succeeded by: London Borough of Havering
- Status: Urban district
- Government: Hornchurch Urban District Council
  - HQ: Langtons House, Hornchurch
  - Motto: A good name endureth
- Coat of arms of Hornchurch Urban District Council
- Today part of: London Borough of Havering

Hornchurch was a local government district in southwest Essex from 1926 to 1965, formed as an urban district for the civil parish of Hornchurch. It was greatly expanded in 1934 with the addition of Cranham, Great Warley, Rainham, Upminster and Wennington; and in 1936 by gaining North Ockendon. Hornchurch Urban District Council was based at Langtons House in Hornchurch from 1929. The district formed a suburb of London and with a population peaking at 131,014 in 1961, it was one of the largest districts of its type in England. It now forms the greater part of the London Borough of Havering in Greater London.

== History ==
=== Background ===
The large ancient parish of Hornchurch had been coterminous with the liberty and manor of Havering since its formation in antiquity. Havering-atte-Bower and Romford formed chapelries and were split off as parishes in the 1780s and 1849 respectively, leaving a rump Hornchurch civil parish.

The liberty was abolished in 1892; although by this date in Hornchurch it had already been superseded by various ad-hoc bodies, such as the Romford Poor Law Union and the Romford Rural Sanitary District. The Hornchurch parish passed to Romford Rural District in 1894 and Hornchurch Parish Council was created. The first election to the parish council took place in December 1894 with thirteen councillors elected. Hornchurch formed part of the London Traffic Area from 1924.

=== Gaining urban status ===
Hornchurch Parish Council considered the case for gaining the powers of an urban district council in September 1911. At a meeting in October concerns were raised by Hornchurch Ratepayers' Association about potential increase in the rates. By 1925 the rate of housebuilding in the parish had increased, with eight separate estates under construction and greater control of development was an argument in favour of gaining urban powers. In March 1925 it was reported that the issue was put to a vote. The parish council voted on the matter with eight in favour of urban powers and seven against. In 1925 the parish council applied for conversion of the parish to an urban district. Inquiries were held in May 1925 for Dagenham and Hornchurch gaining urban powers. The Romford Rural District Council and Hornchurch Ratepayers' Association opposed Hornchurch gaining urban powers. The last meeting of the parish council took place on 9 March 1926. Hornchurch parish was removed from the rural district on 1 April 1926 when Hornchurch Urban District and Hornchurch Urban District Council were formed.

=== Interwar reorganisation ===
Following the Local Government Act 1929, county councils were required to review districts, with a view to amalgamating smaller councils or adjusting boundaries to be more convenient. In December 1929 Hornchurch Urban District Council favoured amalgamation with Upminster and Cranham. In 1930 it was proposed that the northwestern section (west of Park Lane) and northeastern section (Harold Wood) would transfer to Romford Urban District. Romford Urban District Council rejected the scheme with the clerk of the council referring to the area west of Park Lane as the "Sloper's Island" slum and the worst part of the district. The council felt the opportunity had been missed to make the Romford/Hornchurch boundary more regular and also desired the transfer of the Roneo factory to Romford. Alternative schemes were proposed by Romford Urban District Council and Dagenham Urban District Council to annex more of Hornchurch. It was decided in 1933 that the Harold Wood section would not transfer to Romford and the southern part of Hornchurch would not transfer to Dagenham.

As part of the county review order in 1934 the urban district was extended to the east, by gaining 11,687 acres (47.30 km^{2}) from Romford Rural District. This area corresponded to all of the Rainham and Wennington parishes and the greater part of Upminster, Cranham and Great Warley. There was a small loss of territory to Romford in the northwest where the urban district came close to Romford town centre. Purfleet Urban District Council made an unsuccessful petition to the High Court to oppose the transfer of part of North Ockendon from Orsett Rural District to Hornchurch as part of the review. This delayed the transfer of 1,326 acres (5.37 km^{2}) and it was completed as part of another county review order in 1936.

=== Merger with Romford ===
In 1948, as part of the Local Government Boundary Commission, Romford Borough Council suggested it could be merged with Hornchurch to form a new county borough. This was rejected by the chairman of Hornchurch Urban District Council and it was suggested Hornchurch would seek incorporation. In 1949, Hornchurch was one of the largest urban districts with populations over 100,000 that sought incorporation (along with Harrow and Enfield). The council unsuccessfully petitioned for incorporation as a municipal borough on 20 May 1955. This was refused, pending a review of the local government arrangements of the Greater London area.

The urban district of Hornchurch formed part of the review area of the Royal Commission on Local Government in Greater London. The proposal of the commission was for Hornchurch to form a Greater London borough. The transfer to Greater London was supported by Hornchurch Urban District Council and opposed by Essex County Council. The London Government Bill that resulted from the commission provided for larger areas, with populations over 200,000. Hornchurch (population 131,014 in 1961) was planned to merge with Romford (population 114,584) as 'Borough 15'. An amendment was proposed by John Parker, MP for Dagenham, that the Rainham and South Hornchurch wards would become part of 'Borough 14' (Barking/Dagenham), but this was defeated. During the debate Godfrey Lagden, MP for Hornchurch, described the combination of Hornchurch with Romford as a 'happy wedding' with a 'great community of interest'. He suggested Havering-atte-Bower as the name for the new borough. This was adopted in 1965 as the London Borough of Havering, which replaced Hornchurch Urban District and the Municipal Borough of Romford. Havering London Borough Council was elected in 1964 and acted as a shadow authority until 1965, when the transfer from Essex to Greater London was completed.

== Geography ==
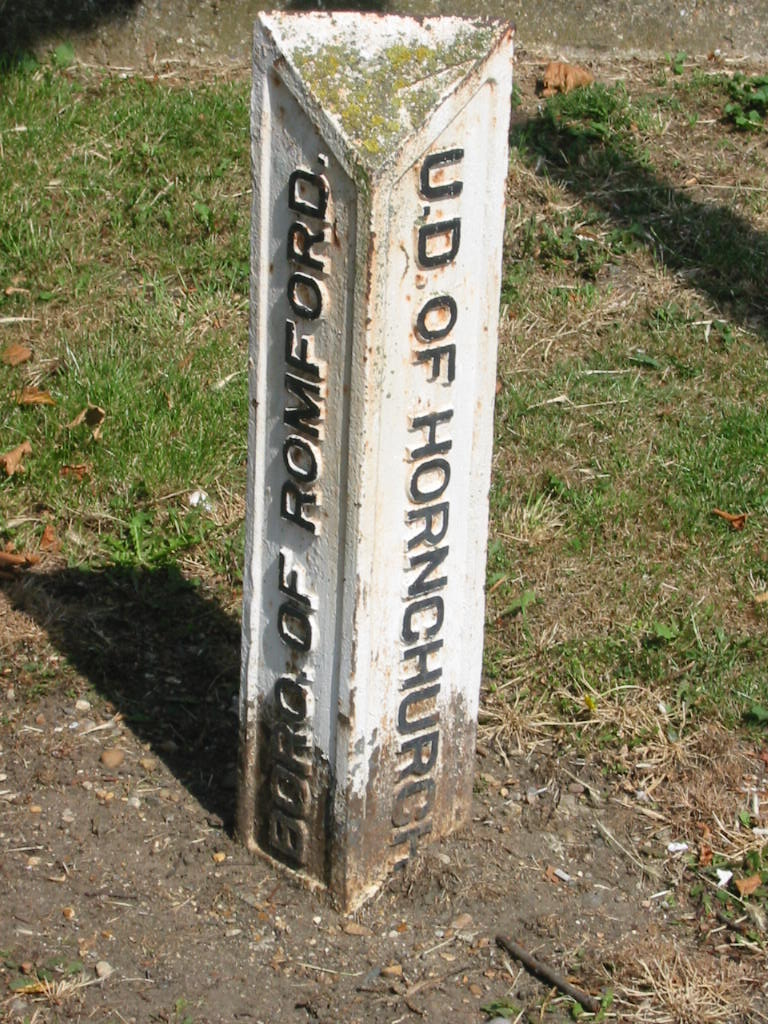
Boundary marker at Roneo Corner

The civil parish of Hornchurch became an urban district in 1926. It included Harold Wood in the northeast and stretched south through the town of Hornchurch to South Hornchurch and the River Thames.

There was a rapid expansion of the population because of suburban house building and new industries were developing in Outer London during the 1930s, such as the nearby Ford Motor Company plant at Dagenham (which also extended into the district) and Londoners were moving to the new suburban estates of houses that were built around them. New College, Oxford owned a substantial part of the land in Hornchurch for several centuries, but had sold it all off by 1934.

The Barking–Upminster railway line through the district was electrified in the 1930s and new stations were opened at Elm Park and Upminster Bridge, in addition to the earlier stations at Hornchurch and Upminster.

== Hornchurch Urban District Council ==
The council was first elected on 27 March 1926, replacing Hornchurch Parish Council from 1 April. 13 councillors were elected from the existing four wards of Harold Wood (2), North West Hornchurch (5), South Hornchurch (1) and Hornchurch Village (4). It was hoped the election to the new authority might increase voter turnout from the parish council elections, but this was not the case.

After the 1934 enlargement, the district was divided into eight wards, electing 21 councillors as follows:

Ward	Electors	Councillors
Cranham	869	1
Emerson Park	4263	3
Harold Wood	2744	2
North West	7176	5
Rainham	2779	2
Thameside	1631	1
Town	5700	4
Upminster	4513	3

The wards were revised again in 1936 when the Cranham ward was extended to include the part of North Ockendon absorbed by the district.

In 1948 the number of councillors was increased to 27. The number of wards increased to nine in 1952, by the addition of an Elm Park ward, electing a total of 30 councillors. The number of wards increased to 10 in 1958 and the 30 councillors were redistributed.

=== Elections ===
Elections took place every year with a third of councillors going out each year. Elections were held in 1926, 1927, 1928, 1929, 1930, 1931, 1932, and 1933. When the district expanded in 1934 the cycle continued in Hornchurch parish with an all-out election in the expanded area and then by thirds each year. Elections were held in 1934, 1935, 1936, 1937, 1938 and 1939. Councillors elected in 1937, 1938 and 1939, that were due to go out in 1940, 1941 and 1942, had their terms extended to 1946, 1947 and 1948. This was due to the Second World War, and the provisions of the Local Elections and Register of Electors (Temporary Provisions) Acts 1939–1944 and the Representation of the People Act 1945.

=== Political control ===
Political control of the council was as follows:

- No overall control, 1926–28
- Ratepayers' association, 1928–35
- No overall control, 1935–46
- Labour Party, 1946–48
- Conservative Party, 1949–54
- Labour Party, 1954–55
- Conservative Party, 1955–56
- Labour Party, 1956–60
- No overall control, 1960–65

=== Civic works ===
The council operated Queen's Theatre and constructed Hornchurch Stadium in Upminster. Harrow Lodge Park, Haynes Park, Hylands Park and St Andrew's Park were created by the council.

Hornchurch Swimming Pool, which opened in 1957, was the first new swimming pool in the country to be built after the Second World War.

=== Housing ===
The urban district contained 464 council houses in 1926. The council built a further 150 houses before the Second World War and 3,000 homes between 1945 and 1965.

== Parliamentary representation ==
Hornchurch was within the Romford constituency. In 1945 the Hornchurch constituency was formed to match the urban district.

== Demography ==
=== Population ===
The population of Hornchurch (Note: The civil parish until 1931 and urban district from 1931.) was as follows:

Year	1891	1901	1911	1921	1931	1939	1941	1951	1961
Population	3,841	6,402	9,461	10,891	28,417	81,486	(Note: The census was suspended for World War II.)	104,092	131,014

The 1934 expanded area (Cranham, Great Warley, Rainham, Upminster and Wennington) had a population of 11,121 in 1931.

=== Housing ===
The annual reports of the medical officer of health for Hornchurch give the following statistics from part of the period of rapid suburban expansion:

Statistic	1931	1932	1933	1934	1935	1936	1937	1938
Population (mid-year estimates)	28,590	33,720	38,650	55,798	59,910	64,447	72,010	76,000
Inhabited houses	8,759	9,914	11,548	17,782	18,042	20,923	23,406	24,100
New council houses (Hornchurch UDC)	10	22	14	6	6	10	2	56
New houses (all others)	1,114	1,131	1,566	1,304	1,441	1,387	2,164	2,111
New roads (feet)	18,141	7,202	17,974	31,149	22,130	31,507	11,942	50,842

During this period 12,344 new homes and 134,474 feet (25.5 miles) of new streets were added to the district. The population increased by 47,410.

== Legacy ==
In 1993 some of the eastern sections of the former urban district around Great Warley were transferred back to Essex.
