= Wildspace Conservation Park =

UK conservation park under development

Wildspace
- Interactive map of Wildspace
- Type: Conservation park
- Location: Rainham, London
- Coordinates: 51.5029°N 0.195°E
- Area: 6.4 km^{2} (2.5 sq mi)
- Created: 2006 (first phase)
- Operator: Greater London Authority
- Status: In development

The Wildspace Conservation Park, also known as London Riverside Conservation Park or Wildspace, is a major new conservation park under development. The conservation park is predominantly in London, within the London Borough of Havering, but also extends across the capital's administrative boundary and into Thurrock in Essex. It covers much of the land adjacent to the River Thames near to Rainham and Wennington. The RSPB nature reserve is the largest part of the park to be open to the public. Later phases include the reuse of a large landfill site as parkland.

== History ==
It was identified as a flagship project for the Thames Gateway in 2003 and a feasibility study was undertaken. The project was a partnership between the London Thames Gateway Development Corporation, the Royal Society for the Protection of Birds (RSPB), the Mayor of London, the London Development Agency, Havering Council, Thurrock Council and the Thurrock Thames Gateway Development Corporation.

Plans for the park were set out in 2005, in a document endorsed by Bill Oddie. The land was owned by the LTGDC, the London Borough of Havering, the RSPB, the Port of London Authority, Oldrealm Ltd and Cleanaway Ltd.

The opening of the park was announced 2006.

The Wildspace policy forms part of the London Riverside Opportunity Area Planning Framework adopted by the Greater London Authority in 2015, the Thurrock Core Strategy adopted in 2015 and the Havering Local Plan adopted in 2021.

== Park components ==
The conservation park is seen as a flagship new green space within the London Riverside section of the London Thames Gateway regeneration area. When complete, it will form a 6.4 km^{2} (640 hectares / 1580 acres) conservation, recreation and amenity zone twice the size of Hampstead Heath.

The 2005 masterplan identified the following components:

- Rainham marsh
- Silt lagoons
- Rainham landfill
- RSPB nature reserve
