= South Hornchurch =

Coordinates: 51.5300°N 0.1850°E

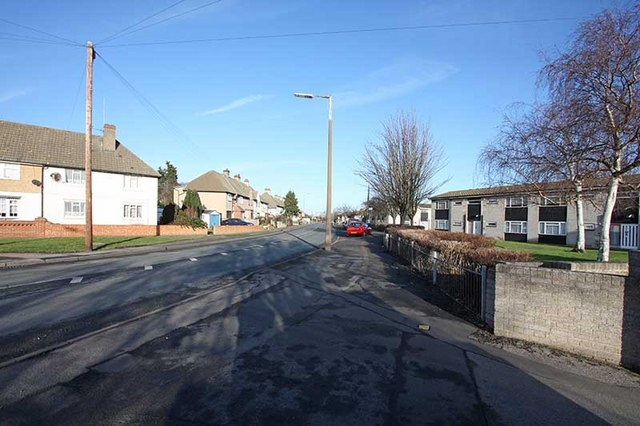
- South End Road.

- Location within Greater London
- Population: 13,544 (2011 Census. Ward)
- OS grid reference: TQ515835
  - Charing Cross: 13.6 mi (21.9 km) W
- London borough: Havering
- Ceremonial county: Greater London
- Region: London
- Country: England
- Sovereign state: United Kingdom
- Post town: RAINHAM
- Postcode district: RM13
- Dialling code: 01708
- Police: Metropolitan
- Fire: London
- Ambulance: London
- UK Parliament: Dagenham and Rainham
- London Assembly: Havering and Redbridge

South Hornchurch is a locality to the south of Hornchurch in London Borough of Havering, east London. It is a suburban development situated 13.6 miles (21.8 km) east of Charing Cross. The area is a relatively recent addition, compared with the more mature suburbs in Havering. It was built on open farmland and the former site of RAF Hornchurch.

== History ==
=== Toponymy ===
According to Mills (2001) the name South Hornchurch is not an old one, it was devised at the time of the local housing development. However the ancient parish of Hornchurch was divided into wards, one of which was called South End and covered the area between the town and the River Thames.

=== Local government ===
The ancient parish of Hornchurch formed the royal manor and liberty of Havering. It was divided into the three chapelries of Havering-atte-Bower, Hornchurch and Romford. The South End, North End and Town wards were part of the Hornchurch chapelry under the control of the Hornchurch vestry. Town ward was absorbed into North End and South End wards around 1722. The boundaries of the South End ward were the River Ingrebourne in the east, the River Thames to the south and the River Beam to the west. In the north the boundary was formed by (in modern terms) by Hornchurch Road, High Street and Upminster Road. In 1894 the Hornchurch vestry was replaced by a parish council. From 1926 to 1965 the area was part of Hornchurch Urban District, under the control of Hornchurch Urban District Council. In 1965 Hornchurch Urban District was abolished and the area became part of the London Borough of Havering in Greater London.

=== Urban development ===
Much of lower South Hornchurch, near Thames was occupied by Mardyke Farm. A large, high density housing estate was built on this land by Hornchurch Urban District Council in 1964. Some residential streets in South Hornchurch were named after places in New Zealand by Hornchurch Urban District Council in 1947 in reference to the use of the New Zealand Convalescent Hospital located in Hornchurch during the First World War.

== Geography ==
The River Beam forms the western boundary with Dagenham, the River Ingrebourne the eastern boundary with Rainham, to the northwest is Elm Park, and to the north is Eastbrookend Country Park. To the south are the industrialised Hornchurch Marshes and the River Thames. South Hornchurch is contiguous with Rainham to the east and the two settlements are connected by the Rainham Bridge over the Ingrebourne. They share the postcode district RM13 and are within the Rainham post town.
