= Grey Towers =

New Zealand Convalescent Hospital
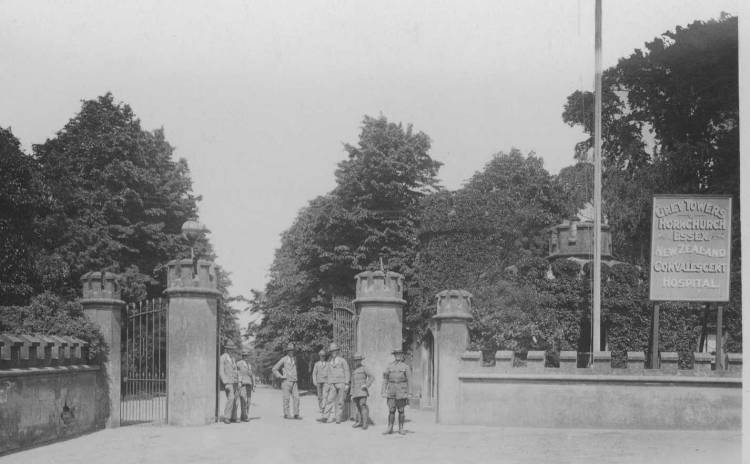
- New Zealand soldiers stand at the entrance gates to Grey Towers

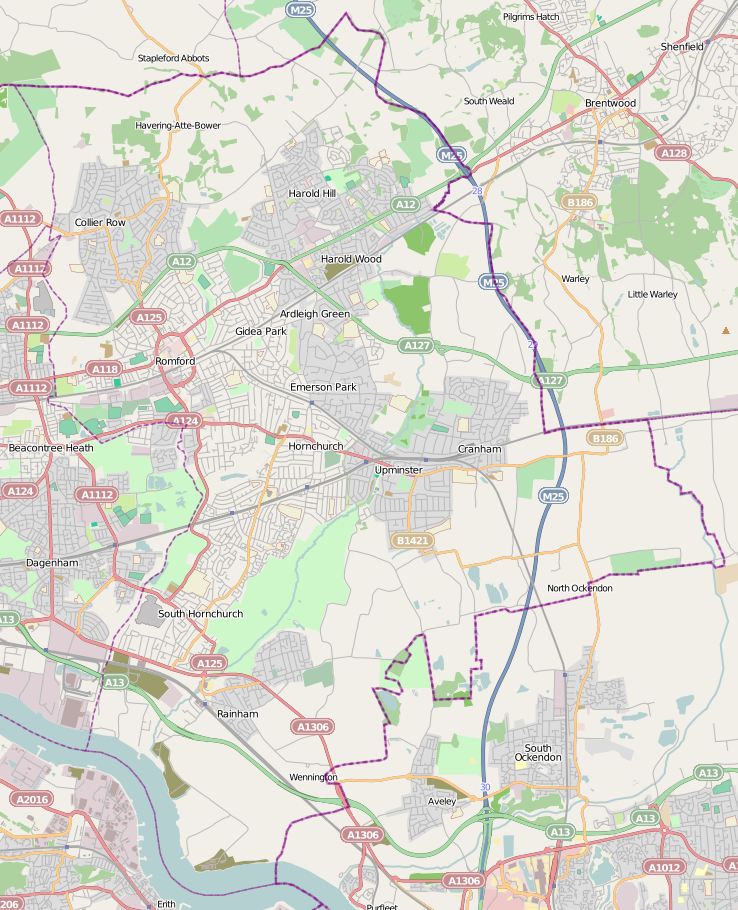
- Location within Havering

Geography
- Location: Hornchurch, London, England, United Kingdom
- Coordinates: 51.564°N 0.213°E

History
- Founded: 1916
- Closed: 1919

Links
- Lists: Hospitals in England

Grey Towers was a crenellated mansion with 85 acres of grounds on Hornchurch Road in Hornchurch, England. It was built in 1876 and brought into public use as the New Zealand Convalescent Hospital during the First World War. In the interwar period Hornchurch was developed as a suburb and Grey Towers was demolished to be used for housing.

== History ==
The gothic mansion was built in 1876 for Lieutenant-Colonel Henry Holmes, the owner of the Hornchurch Brewery. The grounds included the pitch used by Hornchurch Cricket Club. The house was put up for sale in June 1914 after the death of the owners.

=== First World War ===
External images
- YMCA huts at New Zealand Convalescent Hospital
- Buffet in the YMCA, New Zealand Convalescent Hospital
- Grey Towers lodge house, 1967

During the First World War it was purchased by the Army Council. From November 1914 it was used as a military depot, housing first the 23rd Royal Fusiliers and then the 26th Middlesex Regiment. In January 1916 it was decided that Grey Towers would become the command depot of the New Zealand Contingent, although was later changed, and from July 1916 it was used as the New Zealand Convalescent Hospital, with 1,500 beds.

=== Demolition ===
In the interwar period Hornchurch developed as a suburb of London and land was required for house building. Grey Towers was demolished in 1931. The driveway to the house is now a road of suburban houses called Grey Towers Avenue and the entrance gates were moved to Hylands Park. Towers Cinema opened on part of the site on 3 August 1935. Some residential streets in South Hornchurch were named after places in New Zealand by Hornchurch Urban District Council in 1947 in reference to the use of the house. The two lodges, built in the same crenellated style as the house survived to the 1960s and were used as dwellings.
