= Hornchurch =

Town in east London, England

Coordinates: 51.5565°N 0.2128°E

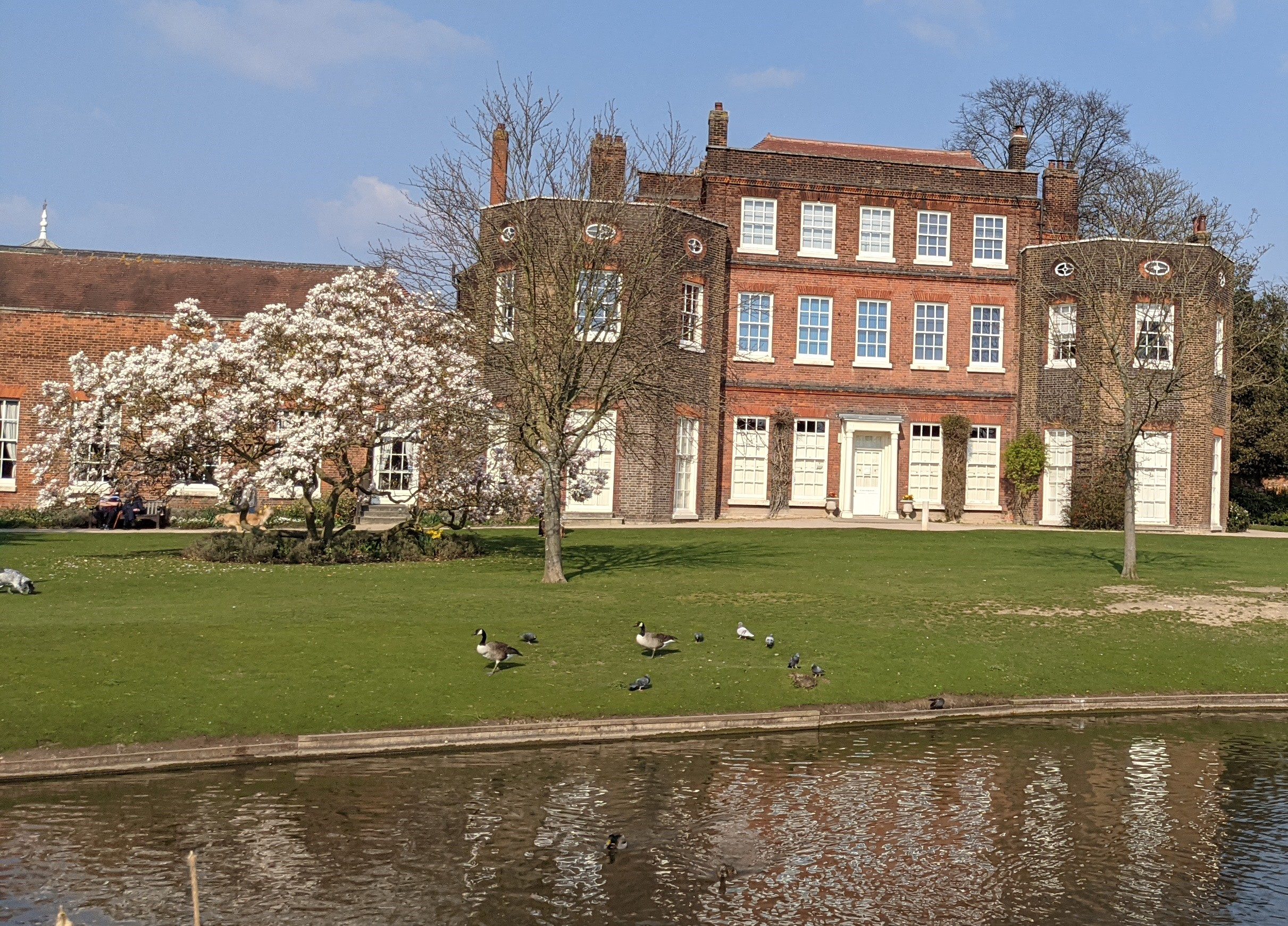
- Langtons house and grounds were given to Hornchurch in 1929

- Location within Greater London
- OS grid reference: TQ535865
  - Charing Cross: 15.2 mi (24.5 km) WSW
- London borough: Havering
- Ceremonial county: Greater London
- Region: London
- Country: England
- Sovereign state: United Kingdom
- Post town: HORNCHURCH
- Postcode district: RM11, RM12
- Dialling code: 01708
- Police: Metropolitan
- Fire: London
- Ambulance: London
- UK Parliament: Hornchurch and Upminster; Dagenham and Rainham
- London Assembly: Havering and Redbridge

Hornchurch is a suburban town in East London in the London Borough of Havering. It is located 15.2 miles (24.5 km) east-northeast of Charing Cross. It comprises a number of shopping streets and a large residential area. It historically formed a large ancient parish in the county of Essex that became the manor and liberty of Havering. The economic history of Hornchurch is underpinned by a shift away from agriculture to other industries with the growing significance of nearby Romford as a market town and centre of administration. As part of the suburban growth of London in the 20th century, Hornchurch significantly expanded and increased in population, becoming an urban district in 1926 and has formed part of Greater London since 1965. It is the location of Queen's Theatre, Havering Sixth Form College and Havering College of Further and Higher Education.

== History ==
=== Toponymy ===
According to Mills, Hornchurch is first recorded in English in 1233 as Hornechurch and means 'church with horn-like gables'. It has been suggested that the Hornchurch Priory is the origin of the Hornchurch placename because the priory used a bulls-head seal on official documents during the 14th century. Both the seal and, since c. 1600, the bull emblem on the wall of the parish church derive from the name rather than provide the origin.

=== Origins ===
In the Anglian Ice Age, 450,000 years ago, the ice sheet reached The Dell, just south of St Andrew's Church, the furthest south any ice sheet reached in Britain. Hornchurch Cutting is a Site of Special Scientific Interest just north of St Andrew’s Park, which exhibits the geology. Stone Age tools and Bronze Age and Iron Age artefacts have been discovered in Hornchurch, indicating a lengthy occupation in pre-history. Roman remains, sufficient to indicate a settlement, have also been found in South Hornchurch.

=== Hornchurch Priory and New College ===
In 1158/9 Henry II gave 1,500 acres (6.1 km^{2}) of southern Hornchurch to the hospice of Great St Bernard Hospice in Savoy. Hornchurch Priory was established and in 1163 St Andrew's Church and adjacent land were given by Henry II to the priory, with a house built to the north of the church. The priory lands in total were around 1,900 acres (7.7 km^{2}). The priory claimed exclusive spiritual authority within the ancient parish of Hornchurch, which was the same area as the manor of Havering at that time. The Parliament of England authorised the king to confiscate the property of alien religious houses that supported the Avignon Papacy in 1379. The members of the priory left the house in 1385 and the property was seized. The lands were purchased in 1391 by William of Wykeham for the endowment of New College, Oxford. The site of the priory became Hornchurch Hall.

=== Economic development ===
The Hornchurch Marsh was used for cattle grazing and became popular with butchers, inn owners and others in the City of London and by the 19th century it had become famous for the quality of the cattle sent to the London meat market. Havering was a centre of leather production from the 13th to 16th centuries. The high street was known as Pell Street, reflecting the importance of the leather trade in Hornchurch. There was a brewery in Hornchurch from 1789 to 1929. The Speedwell (later renamed Ormonde) cycle factory was located on Hornchurch Road from around 1879 to 1900. It employed 100 "men and boys" in 1897. Stafford Allen and Sons set up a chemical factory in Ardleigh Green, adjacent to the railway tracks, after their first choice of a nearby site in Gidea Park was rejected in 1919. Lacrinoid Products took over the site in 1936 for a plastics factory.

=== Local government ===
Hornchurch civil parish boundaries before the expansion of Hornchurch Urban District in 1934

Hornchurch was a large ancient parish in the Becontree hundred of Essex; it was divided into the three chapelries of Havering-atte-Bower, Hornchurch and Romford. The Hornchurch chapelry stretched from the River Thames in the south to Harold Wood in the north and was located between the River Ingrebourne in the east and the River Beam in the west. It was also known as 'Hornchurch side' and consisted of the North End, South End and Town wards. Town ward was absorbed into North End and South End around 1722. Hornchurch chapelry occupied 6,783 acres (2,745 ha) of the 16,100-acre (6,500 ha) ancient parish. The local authority was the Hornchurch vestry. The royal manor of Havering, which was conterminous with the ancient parish of Hornchurch, enjoyed special status and a charter in 1465 removed it from the Becontree hundred and the county of Essex to instead form an independent liberty. By the 16th century 'Romford side', comprising the five northern wards of Romford Town, Harold Wood, Collier Row, Noak Hill and Havering, had grown larger than Hornchurch and had achieved some degree of independence from the Hornchurch vestry. Havering ward grew independent in its own right and became a separate parish in the late 18th century.

Following the Poor Law Amendment Act 1834, Hornchurch and Romford became separate civil parishes in 1836 and were grouped into the Romford Poor Law Union. The area of the union, excluding the town of Romford, became a rural sanitary district in 1875. The special status of the Liberty of Havering was abolished in 1892 and the area was reincorporated into Essex. In 1894 the Hornchurch vestry was replaced by Hornchurch Parish Council. The rural sanitary district became Romford Rural District and the local authority became Romford Rural District Council. The Hornchurch Ratepayers' Association was formed in 1900 and stood candidates in local elections. As the population of Hornchurch was rising, the parish council was abolished in 1926 and the parish was removed from the rural district. On 1 April 1926 the parish of Hornchurch became Hornchurch Urban District and the local authority became Hornchurch Urban District Council, with the first election having taken place on 27 March 1926. The council met at Langtons House from 1929. The urban district was significantly expanded in 1934 when the parishes of Cranham, Rainham, Upminster, Wennington and part of Great Warley were added. In 1936 part of North Ockendon was added to the district. The area formed part of the London Traffic Area from 1924 and the London Passenger Transport Area from 1933. The whole area was included in the London Borough of Havering in 1965 and it was transferred from Essex to Greater London. For elections to the Greater London Council, Hornchurch was part of the Havering electoral division until 1973 and then the Hornchurch electoral division until 1986.

=== Suburban expansion ===
Hornchurch (parish) population
1881	2,824
1891	3,841
1901	6,402
1911	9,461
1921	10,891
1931	28,417
1941	war #
1951	79,908
# no census was held due to war
source: UK census

Railway stations opened in the parish of Hornchurch at Harold Wood in 1868 and Hornchurch in 1885. Both stations were some distance from the village and did not initially encourage large-scale housebuilding.

In 1886 the parish authorities of St Leonard Shoreditch purchased 80 acres of Harrow Lodge Farm for the construction of the Hornchurch cottage homes that opened in 1889. The homes had a population of 306 in 1896. In 1897 Hornchurch had a population of 4,200. It was a large village with scattered groups of houses throughout the rest of the parish and in the northwest the built-up area of Romford extended into it. The growth of Hornchurch from rural village to suburban town began with the sale of the southern 200 acres (0.81 km^{2}) of Nelmes manor for the Emerson Park housing estate of 200 homes in 1895. In 1901 the 241 acres (0.98 km^{2}) northern portion of Nelmes was sold for the Great Nelmes housing estate. Emerson Park railway station was opened in 1909 to serve the new estates.

Uphavering Terrace, the first 18 council houses in Hornchurch, were constructed on Abbs Cross Lane in 1914 by Romford Rural District Council at the request of Hornchurch Parish Council. 50 houses at Princes Park and 48 at Priors Park were constructed in the early 1920s by the Romford Rural District Council following the Housing, Town Planning, &c. Act 1919 as "housing of the working classes". In total, 186 houses were built by 1922. 60 further houses were built by Hornchurch Urban District Council on Suttons Avenue and Park Lane from 1928.

The construction of the dual carriageways of the Southend Arterial Road between 1925 and 1940 cut off the Harold Wood part of the parish from the rest.

Hornchurch was quickly built upon as part of the interwar private housing boom that saw workers migrate from the inner districts of London. This was encouraged by the introduction of the electric District Railway service from 1932 and the availability of cheap agricultural land for development. The population of Hornchurch grew by 335% from 1921 to 1938 as new homes were occupied. 50 acres of Haynes Park Farm was sold in 1925 for development as the Haynes Park building estate. The New College lands were sold for development between 1927 and 1931. The density of interwar development was much higher than the Emerson Park and Great Nelmes estates. In 1930 the development of the Wych Elm Farm estate caused an arbitration case which only partially upheld the restrictive covenant on the size of houses that could be built. Grey Towers mansion was demolished in 1931 and the grounds used for the Grey Towers housing estate and the Towers Cinema. Stafford Allen and Sons built houses for factory employees along Stafford Avenue around 1931.

In 1931 Hornchurch Hall, Priors Farm and Grove Farm were being developed for housing and the Crescent and Ravenscourt estates were being built. In 1932 the Hardley Green, Harold Wood Hall, Lee Gardens and Redden Court estates were being built. In 1933 an extension to the Hardley Green estate was under construction and work on the Maylands, Dorset House and Hornford estates was underway. Wyebridge, Elm and Uphavering farms were purchased in 1933 by Richard Costain and Sons for the Elm Park Garden City development. 7,000 houses were planned with the official opening of the estate in 1935. This coincided with the opening of Elm Park tube station and Harrow Lodge Park. Elm Park had a higher density of development than previous schemes and had its own town centre. 2,600 houses were built by 1939 with further development halted by the Second World War. After the war, the estate was completed with over 1,000 council houses.

Nelmes manor house and immediate grounds survived until 1967 when the house was demolished by the owner to avoid a preservation order by the Greater London Council. The land was used for The Witherings neo-Georgian style housing development.

=== Hornchurch Airfield and the military ===
During both the First World War and Second World War nearby Hornchurch Airfield was an important RAF station; it was known as RFC Suttons Farm during the Great War, with its HQ as far away as Upminster Hall. During the Second World War, the airfield was known as RAF Hornchurch, and was home mostly to a number of Spitfire squadrons, with an advanced sub-station at Rayleigh. The land has since been reused for a large housing development and Hornchurch Country Park. During the First World War a large vacant country estate called Grey Towers on Hornchurch Road was commandeered by the Army Council as a military depot. In January 1916 it became the first Command Depot for the New Zealand Contingent in Britain but was found to be more suitable as a Convalescent Hospital Camp for servicemen from the New Zealand Expeditionary Force, and was run as such until June 1919.

== Governance ==
Hornchurch and Upminster constituency in Greater London

The town forms part of the Hornchurch and Upminster UK Parliament constituency. Elm Park and South Hornchurch are within the Dagenham and Rainham constituency. The local authority is Havering London Borough Council, with councillors elected from the wards of Elm Park, Emerson Park, Hacton. Harold Wood, Hylands and Harrow Lodge, South Hornchurch, Squirrels Heath and St Andrew's. The central part of town is within the St Andrew's ward and the area south of Hornchurch tube station is within the Hacton ward. Western Hornchurch is within the Hylands and Harrow Lodge ward. All of Hornchurch is within the Havering and Redbridge London Assembly constituency.

== Geography ==
The town lies about 82 feet (25 m) above sea level, 15.2 miles (24.5 km) east-northeast of Charing Cross in Central London. The former Hornchurch civil parish was bounded with Upminster and Rainham by the River Ingrebourne to the east, with Dagenham by the River Beam to the west, with Romford to the north and by the River Thames to the south. It included the contemporary districts of Ardleigh Green, Elm Park, Emerson Park, Hornchurch town centre, Hornchurch Marshes and South Hornchurch; and parts of Gidea Park, Harold Wood and Upminster Bridge. Hornchurch is a post town in the RM postcode area, consisting of the RM11 and RM12 postcode districts. RM11 covers north of the high street including Ardleigh Green and Emerson Park, and RM12 covers south of the high street including Elm Park. The Hornchurch Marshes and South Hornchurch are within the Rainham post town and postcode district RM13.

== Economy ==
Hornchurch is identified in the London Plan as a local district centre with 31,000 square metres (330,000 sq ft) of commercial floorspace. It is not considered a significant commercial office location. Within Havering, it is identified as one of seven town centres in the borough, with a retail area extending along High Street, North Street and Station Lane.

== Transport ==
There are no stations in central Hornchurch, but five stations are located within the town; Upminster Bridge tube station is located just within its eastern boundary, Hornchurch tube station is located about 1/2 mi (800 m) south of the high street, Elm Park tube station is about 1 1/2 mi (2.4 km) to the south west on the London Underground and Emerson Park railway station on the London Overground is located about 1/2 mi (800 m) to the north, and Harold Wood railway station on the Great Eastern Main Line to the far north for the Elizabeth line.

Hornchurch is served by the following Transport for London contracted London Bus routes: 165, 193, 248, 252, 256, 365, 370 and 372.

== Religion ==
St Andrew's Church, on High Street, is the original parish church of Hornchurch. It has been Anglican since the Reformation. There are two other Anglican parish churches: Holy Cross in Hornchurch Road, and St George's in Kenilworth Gardens, both built in the 20th century.

Hornchurch also has two Roman Catholic churches: St Mary Mother of God in Hornchurch Road, and the Church of the English Martyrs in Alma Gardens.

== Culture ==
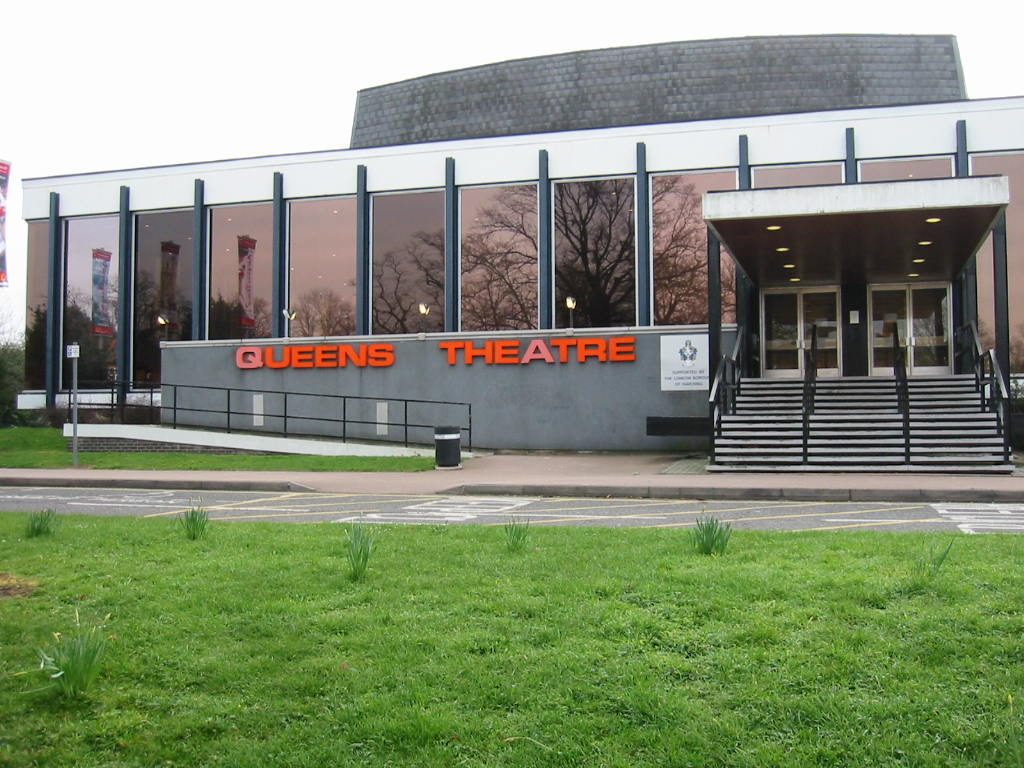
Queen's Theatre

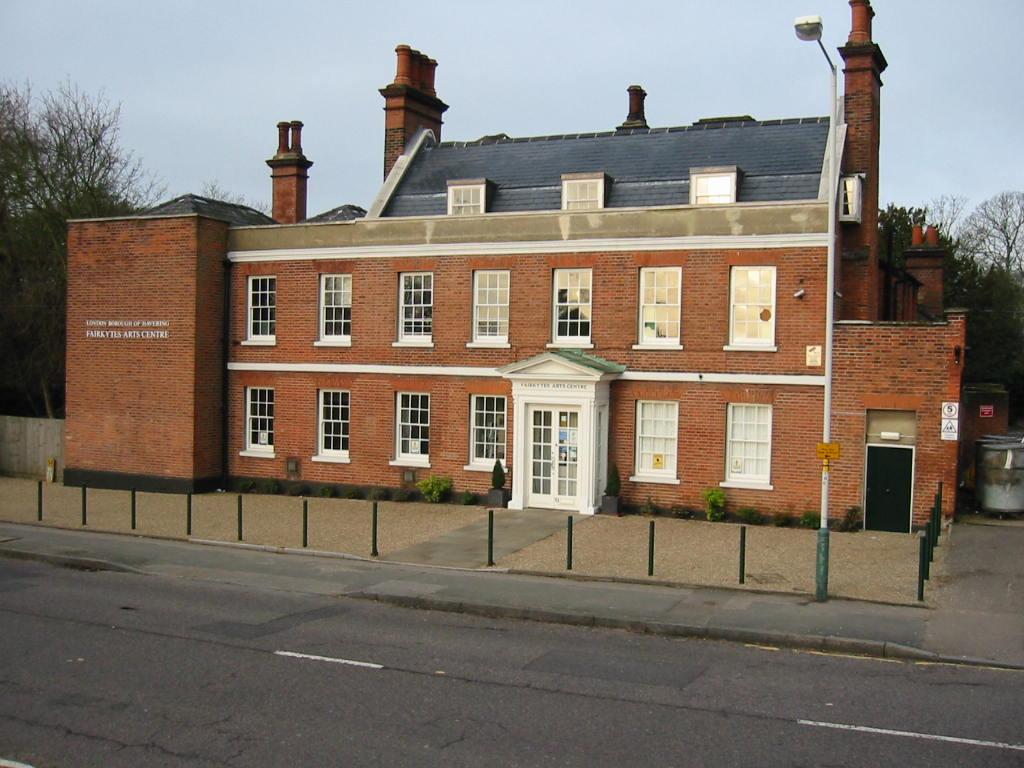
Fairkytes Arts Centre

Hornchurch town centre is the location of Queen's Theatre, 500-seat mid-scale producing theatre and the smaller Fairkytes Arts Centre. The RAF Hornchurch Heritage Centre, a museum that opened in 2021 is located in the south of Hornchurch.

Hornchurch Drum & Trumpet Corps Boys marching band formed in 1959 and perform around the country.

The Towers Cinema on Hornchurch High Street opened in 1936. The Kemp & Tasker building, which was converted into a bingo hall in 1973, is noted for its Art Deco architecture. It has now been demolished to make way for a supermarket.

Hornchurch is served by Time 107.5 FM, located in Romford. The station covers Havering and surrounding areas. Bedrock is the local hospital radio service available online to the Havering area and broadcasting a range of health-related information and locally produced entertainment.

=== Sport ===
Hornchurch F.C. is the local football team, with Havering Hockey Club (formerly Hornchurch Hockey Club) accommodating the field hockey fixtures from their Harrow Lodge Park base. The Rom skatepark is located in the west of Hornchurch and is a Grade II listed structure.

=== Music ===
The local music service is Havering Music School located on Wingletye Lane. Hornchurch is also home to the drum and bass record label RAM Records.

=== Listed buildings ===
In the centre of Hornchurch, St Andrew's Church is Grade I listed. In the south of Hornchurch, Bretons is Grade II* listed.

== See also ==
- List of people from the London Borough of Havering
- List of schools in the London Borough of Havering
