= Harrow Lodge Park =

Park in Hornchurch, London, England

- Interactive map of Harrow Lodge Park
- Type: Public park
- Coordinates: 51°33′17.8″N 0°11′36.4″E
- Operator: Havering London Borough Council
- Open: All year

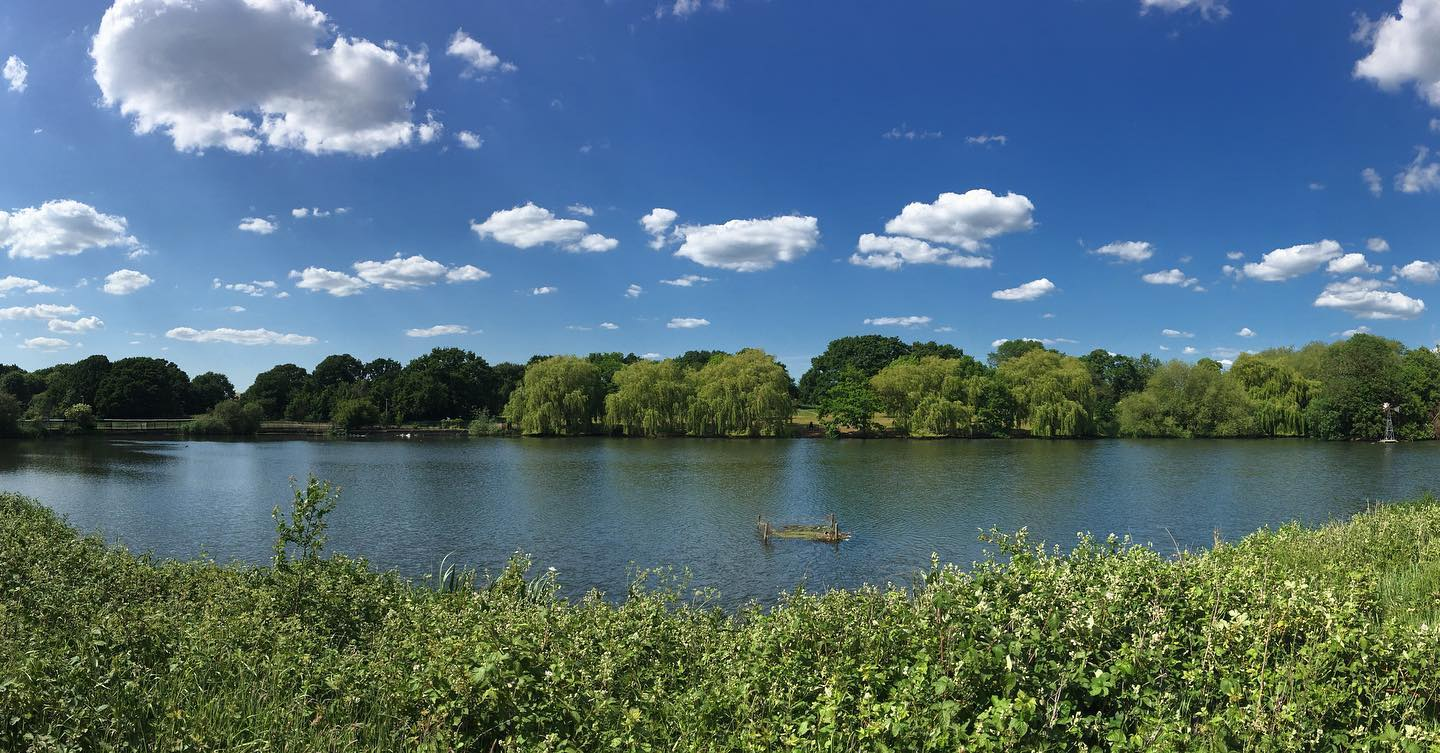
The lake in Harrow Lodge Park, 2020

Harrow Lodge Park is a large public park in Hornchurch in the London Borough of Havering. It was created by Hornchurch Urban District Council, partly on land donated by Richard Costain and Sons Ltd., the developers of Elm Park Garden City housing development. It includes the cricket pitch used by Hornchurch Cricket Club.

== History ==
The park was established by Hornchurch Urban District Council in 1936 when the council purchased the 42 acres (0.17 km^{2}) of Harrow Lodge Farm from the London County Council for £16,250. A further 34.86 acres (0.1411 km^{2}) were added to the park when Costain, developers of Elm Park Garden City, donated land to the council as part of a planning agreement.
