= Ratepayers' association =

Generic name of local political parties in the UK

Ratepayers' association in the United Kingdom and other countries is a name used by a political party or electoral alliance contesting a local election to represent the interests of those who pay rates to the municipal government. In Canada a ratepayers' association is the same thing as a neighbourhood association.

Rates are a property tax which provides a main source of funding for some local governments; the amount paid is usually proportional to the value of the property, and commercial premises may have higher rates than residences. Therefore a ratepayers' association is typically supported by property owners rather than tenants, and by business owners in particular, and has a platform of value-for-money and avoiding wasteful municipal spending. In the United Kingdom, local elections were on a ratepayer franchise until the 1910s, and ratepayers' associations remained prominent until the 1930s, when they lost ground to the three national parties; since the 1960s they have retained a role in scattered urban and suburban areas.

Examples include:

- Heald Green Ratepayers has represented the ward of Heald Green on Stockport Metropolitan Borough Council in England since 1927 (formerly on Gatley UDC prior to the creation of Stockport MBC)
- Citizens and Ratepayers (renamed "Communities and Residents" in 2012) controlled Auckland City Council for most of the years from 1938 to 1998
- Newtownabbey Ratepayers' Association had members on Newtownabbey Borough Council in Northern Ireland from 1997 to 2005
- Wolverhampton Association of Ratepayers had one or two seats on Wolverhampton City Council between 1975 and 1980
- Chingford Ratepayers' Association, which governed Municipal Borough of Chingford until 1965, was nominally independent of the Conservative Party; similarly in many other London boroughs in the early and mid 20th century
- Sligo Ratepayers Association won 8 of 24 seats in the 1919 Sligo Corporation election on an anti-corruption, pro-business ticket.

== See also ==
- Residents' associations, such as the Residents Associations of Epsom and Ewell which governs Epsom and Ewell district in England
- Taxpayer groups, which advocate at a national level

== Bibliography ==
- Grant, W. P. (June 1971). "'Local' Parties in British Local Politics: A Framework for Empirical Analysis". Political Studies. 19 (2): 201–212. doi:10.1111/j.1467-9248.1971.tb00670.x. S2CID 143374051.
- Young, Ken (1975). Local Politics and the Rise of Party: The London Municipal Society and the Conservative Intervention in Local Elections, 1894-1963. Leicester University Press.
