= Harold Park =

Coordinates: 51.600°N 0.243°E

- Location within Greater London
- OS grid reference: TQ555915
- London borough: Havering
- Ceremonial county: Greater London
- Region: London
- Country: England
- Sovereign state: United Kingdom
- Post town: ROMFORD
- Postcode district: RM3
- Dialling code: 01708
- Police: Metropolitan
- Fire: London
- Ambulance: London
- UK Parliament: Hornchurch and Upminster
- London Assembly: Havering and Redbridge

Harold Park is an area to the East of Romford, East London in the London Borough of Havering.

== History ==
Harold Park is north-eastern part of Harold Wood, occupying an isthmus of land between the A12 and the Ingrebourne River (The River Ingrebourne at Harold Park and Hornchurch).

In 1868 a wealthy Brentwood solicitor built himself a mansion to the south of the river and railway line, named Harold Court. After the owner's bankruptcy the house served as a children's home, then a lunatic asylum and then a sanatorium. In 1959 it became a teacher training college and has now been converted into private flats.

Horse Block Farm lay to the north-east of Harold Court Road. After the First World War the Essex builders Iles and Company laid out a bungalow estate here that it called Sunnytown. The company also created Sunnymede at Billericay.

When Harold Court primary school opened in 1929 the area still retained a rural character, but this was slowly eroded as further development plugged the gaps, including some industry beside the Ingrebourne River.

=== Local government ===
Harold Park was located in the northeastern protrusion of the Hornchurch civil parish. It was part of Romford Rural District until 1926 and was then formed part of Hornchurch Urban District.

Harold Park sits in the Parliamentary Constituency of Hornchurch and Upminster.

=== Urban development ===
Maylands Golf club, Harold Park was founded in 1937

== Geography ==
Harold Park sits on the London/Essex border. The boundary goes down the Weald Brook. This has since changed to go down the M25 to junction 11 and then turn west along the A12 to Putwell Bridge where it joins the Ingrebourne. The River Ingrebourne and the Weald Brook meet in the area of Putwell Bridge. The Ingrebourne then flows south west.

=== Nearest places ===
- Harold Wood
- Harold Hill
- Brentwood
- Emerson Park
- Romford
- Gidea Park
- Hornchurch
- Upminster
- Shenfield

== Transport ==
=== Nearest stations ===
- Harold Wood railway station
- Brentwood railway station
- Gidea Park railway station
- Emerson Park railway station
- Shenfield railway station
- Upminster station
