= Liberty line =

Railway line in London

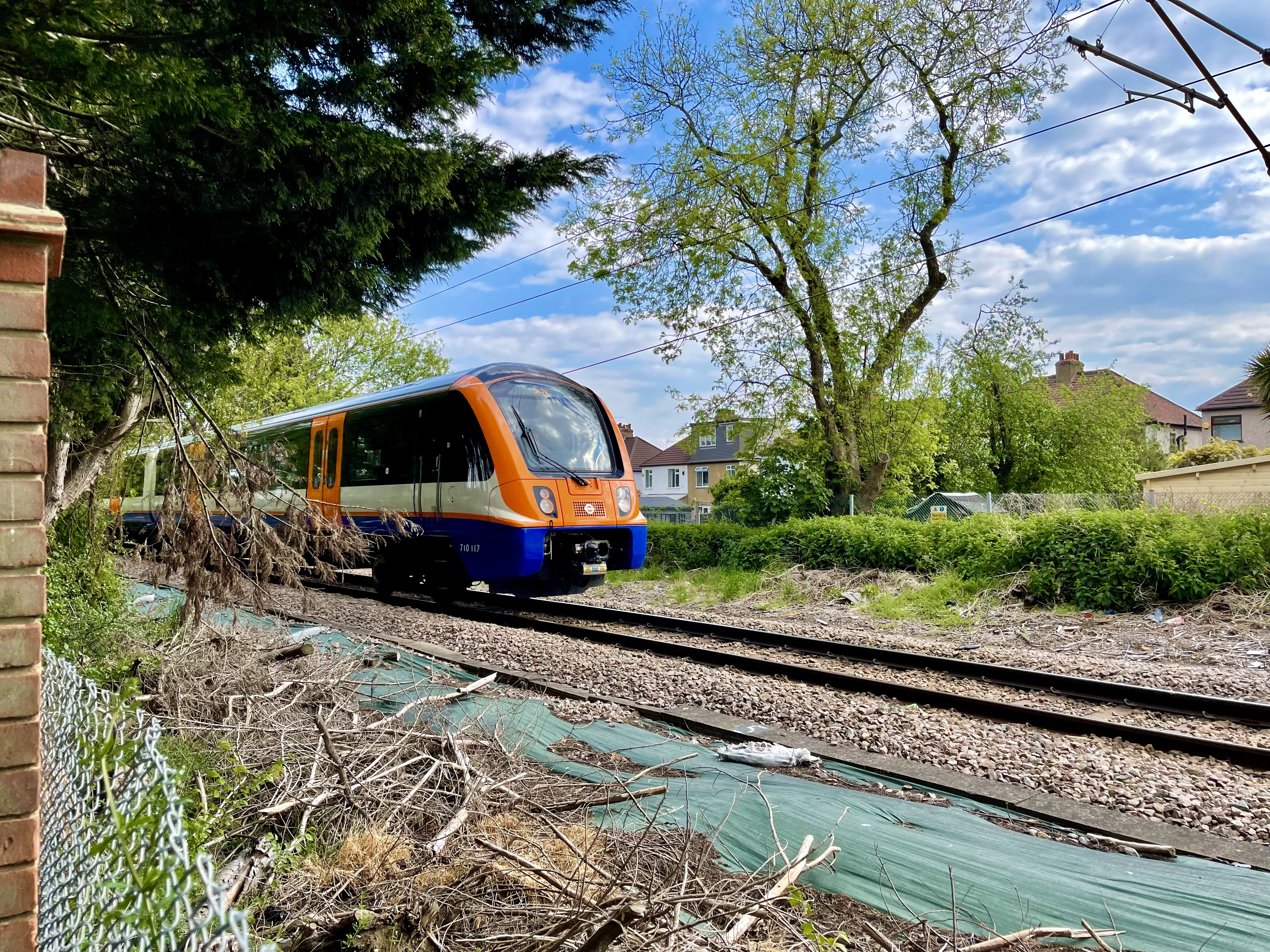
- London Overground Class 710 train

Overview
- Status: Operational
- Owner: Network Rail
- Locale: Havering, London
- Termini: Romford; Upminster
- Stations: 3
- Website: tfl.gov.uk/overground/route/liberty

Service
- Type: Suburban rail, heavy rail
- System: National Rail
- Services: 1
- Operator: London Overground
- Depot: Ilford
- Rolling stock: Class 710

History
- Opened: 7 June 1893; 133 years ago

Technical
- Line length: 3 miles 30 chains (5.4 km)
- Num of tracks: 1
- Character: Branch line
- Track gauge: 1,435 mm (4 ft 8 1/2 in) standard gauge
- Electrification: Overhead line, 25 kV 50 Hz AC
- Operating speed: 30 mph (48 km/h)
Route map
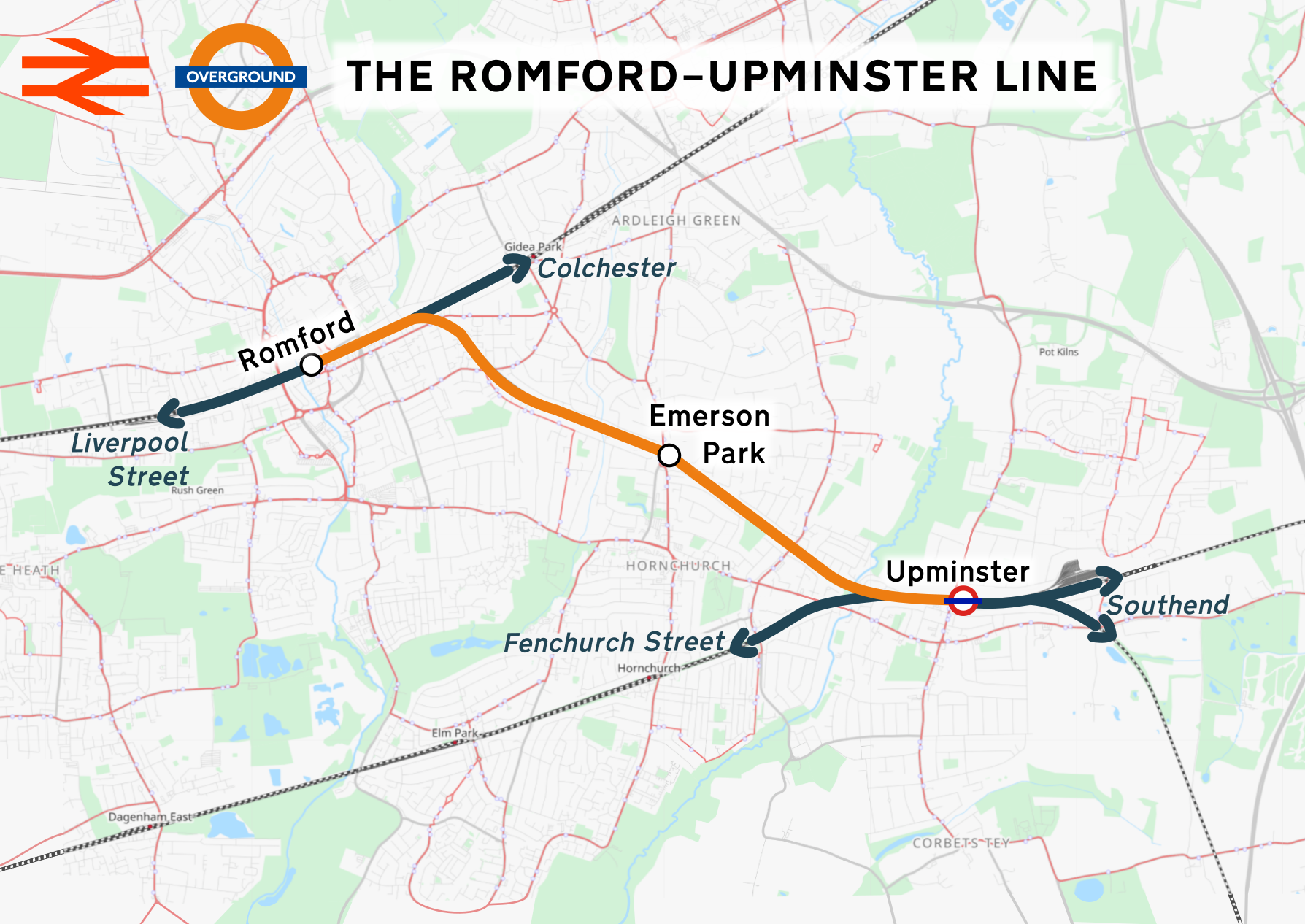
(Click to expand|alt=)

The Liberty line is a passenger railway service in the London Borough of Havering, East London. It is the shortest London Overground line at 3 miles 30 chains (5.4 km). The line has terminals at Romford and Upminster, with a timetabled journey time of nine minutes between them. As of May 2026, there is a service of two trains per hour in each direction. Uniquely, it does not have interchanges with any other London Overground lines.

The Romford–Upminster line was built as a single-track branch line of the London, Tilbury and Southend Railway and opened in 1893. Anticipated goods traffic from Tilbury Docks did not meet expectations. Passenger services ran through to Grays with some extended to Tilbury. Suburban housebuilding caused demand for additional stations, but only one was built at Emerson Park in 1909. Service frequency was increased in 1934 with the introduction of push–pull operation. In 1951, through service beyond Upminster was withdrawn and service frequency was halved. With the introduction of diesel trains in 1956 a regular half-hourly service commenced.

As part of the Beeching cuts, the line faced two attempts at closure in 1963 and 1968. It was electrified in 1984. The service became part of the London Overground network in 2015 and was given the Liberty line name in November 2024. It is part of the Network Rail Anglia route. It has a loading gauge of W6 and a maximum speed of 30 mph (48 km/h).

== History ==
=== Geology ===
During the construction of the railway in 1892, the geologist T. V. Holmes discovered a five-metre (16 ft) layer of boulder clay underlying the gravel and sand in Hornchurch Cutting, just north of what is now St Andrew's Park. It demonstrates the southernmost limit of the Anglian ice sheets 450,000 years ago. Another cutting closer to Romford also showed till between the London Clay and the gravel. Further excavation was done at Hornchurch in 1983.

=== Origins ===
The first railway proposed to link Romford with the north shore of the River Thames was put forward by the Thames Haven Dock and Railway Company who proposed a 16-mile (26 km) line from Romford to Shell Haven. (Note: The line was originally proposed to run from a Central London terminus to Shell Haven, but the scheme was truncated when the Eastern Counties Railway plan to build a line from Shoreditch to Romford moved forward.) The Thames Haven, Dock and Railway Act 1836 was obtained in 1836. By 1842 the company abandoned plans to run a line from Romford. An independently promoted line between Romford and Tilbury was proposed, but did not gain approval in 1882 or 1883. In 1883, the Great Eastern Railway (GER) proposed a line from Romford to Tilbury Docks, passing between Hornchurch and Upminster. The London, Tilbury and Southend Railway (LTSR) proposed a competing scheme between Romford and Grays, passing through their station at Upminster. The LTSR proposal was authorised in 1883. Legislative powers were extended from 1888 to 1891 as work was delayed. The contract to build the Romford–Upminster section was given to Mowlem in June 1890.

The new LTSR line had been authorised in 1883 to a junction with the GER 1 mile (1.6 km) east of Romford and the LTSR had running powers to Romford station. By 1890, with work now underway, the GER did not want to reduce their capacity by allowing LTSR trains to use Romford station. In 1892, an agreement was reached between the two companies for a separate LTSR station at Romford that would be built on GER land. The LTSR would build their own line to the station and the junction between the lines would be brought closer to Romford. LTSR goods traffic would be handled at the GER station, west of the Romford passenger station, for at least three years.

=== Steam era ===
The Romford–Upminster section opened on 7 June 1893. (Note: The Upminster–Grays section had opened on 1 July 1892.) Passenger service was initially eight trains a day in each direction and a reduced service on Sunday. (Note: An additional train ran in each direction on Wednesdays to coincide with Romford Market.) Most trains ran between Romford and Grays, with a few extended to Tilbury. In 1896 the LTSR built their own goods station at Victoria Road, although the GER station continued to be used for access to the Romford Brewery. Trains were operated by tank engines while freight was usually hauled by a small tender engine. Goods traffic from Tilbury did not meet expectations. The LTSR board rejected the request for a station at Butts Green in 1893. Emerson Park Halt was opened as an infill stop on 1 October 1909. To coincide with the opening, the number of Romford–Upminster services was increased and additional shuttle trains were provided between Emerson Park and Upminster, including late evening short runs for returning West End theatregoers. (Note: Four extra services between Romford and Upminster and fourteen Emerson Park to Upminster short runs were provided from 1909.) The LTSR was purchased by the Midland Railway (MR) in 1912. The number of weekday trains was increased to twenty by 1913. (Note: Emerson Park and Upminster served by a total of 31 trains.) Frequency was further increased in the 1920s, with around twenty-three services each way between Romford and Upminster and a further five at peak times between Emerson Park and Upminster. (Note: In the April 1920 timetable there are 27 down (towards Tilbury) and 22 up (towards Romford) trains a day. There were six through trains to Grays, four to Tilbury and five short runs between Emerson Park and Upminster, with a similar number of return trains. On Sundays there were nine trains in each direction.) East of Victoria Road, a private siding to a gravel pit was added in September 1916. The MR was amalgamated with other railways to create the London, Midland and Scottish Railway (LMS) on 1 January 1923.

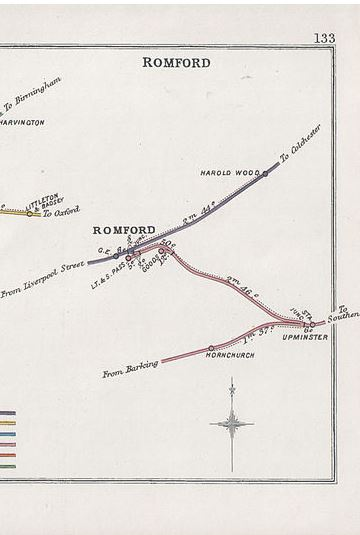
Part of a 1904 Railway Clearing House junction diagram showing the line between Romford and Upminster

By the early 1930s, the area had been completely built-up and there were calls for additional halts at Brentwood Road and Wingletye Lane to serve the new housing estates. The LMS declined these requests. Pressure from the Hornchurch Ratepayers' Association led to improvements in frequency, with push–pull train service commencing on 1 August 1934 and an improved timetable from October 1934. MR 0-4-4T engines were used for push–pull working. The service increased to 30 trains over the Romford–Upminster section on weekdays with five Emerson Park–Upminster short runs. Timings were irregular and seven services continued to Tilbury. This service pattern remained until the Second World War. Services were cut during the war, with Romford–Upminster reduced to twenty-one trains and Emerson Park–Upminster short runs reduced to two. The pre-war 30 trains service was restored in 1946. The line became part of British Railways on 1 January 1948, initially as part of the London Midland Region and then the Eastern Region from 20 February 1949. The short workings between Emerson Park and Upminster were eliminated with all services on the line calling at Upminster, Emerson Park and Romford from 1948. After this time services were taken over by N7 tanks. In 1950, through services beyond Upminster were eliminated except on Sundays. In 1951, during the Abadan Crisis, Romford–Upminster services were withdrawn between the peak periods, in the evenings, and on Sundays. (Note: The Saturday timetable also had a gap in service during the middle of the day.) This reduced daily services to sixteen on Mondays to Fridays and to twenty on Saturdays.

=== Diesel era and closure attempts ===
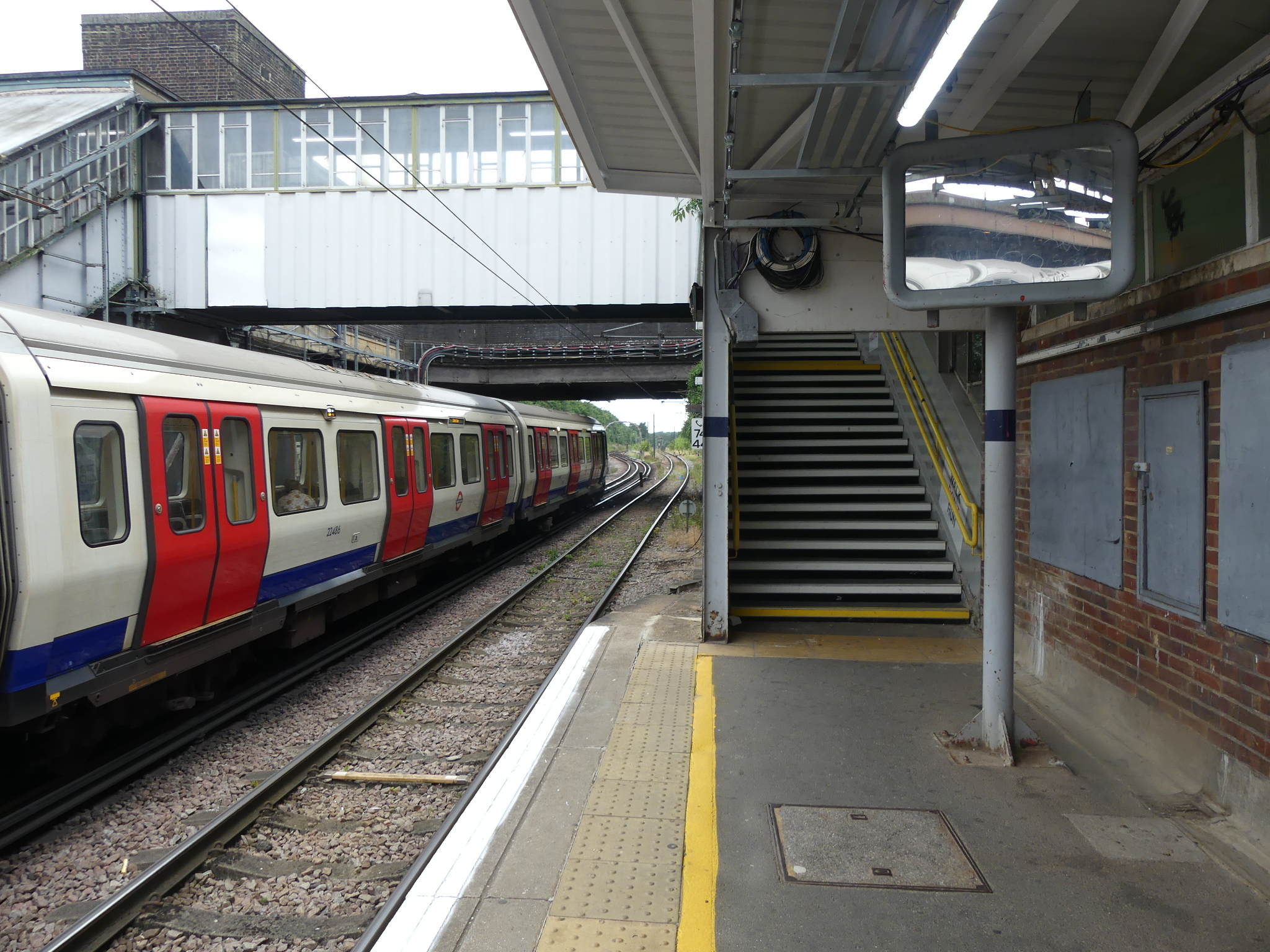
Platform and footbridge added at Upminster in 1957

Trial diesel multiple unit (DMU) operation began in April 1956, with a full diesel service commencing on 17 September 1956. Metro-Cammell Lightweight units and crew from Stratford replaced the steam service. The off-peak and evening services that had been removed in 1951 were restored and trains ran to a regular half-hourly timetable. (Note: Sunday service was not restored at that time.) There were now thirty trains a day in each direction. In order to completely separate District line services from British Railways at Upminster, the Romford–Upminster line was split from the line to Grays. To facilitate this, a new platform 6 was opened on 20 May 1957 next to an existing track that was previously used as a siding.

The line was listed for closure in the Beeching Report of March 1963. Passenger counts were undertaken between 29 June and 4 July 1963. There was organised opposition to the closure with a public meeting held in July 1963. The formal closure application was made on 28 August 1963, with a proposed closure date of 4 January 1965. A replacement peak-only bus service was proposed to take Emerson Park commuters to Gidea Park as the local bus network did not have sufficient capacity to accommodate them. Another public meeting was held in September ahead of a deadline for objections in October 1963. Further passenger counts were taken in September, because the previous count had taken place during service disruption on the Fenchurch Street line. 430 objections were received. The closure was rejected by the Minister of Transport in September 1965. The line was threatened with closure again after the Transport Act 1968 made changes to the support system for loss-making lines. The level of annual subsidy requested for the line increased from £1,500 in 1965 (equivalent to £25,395 in 2025) to £5,000 in 1967 (equivalent to £79,671 in 2025). Reduction to a peak-only service was considered but rejected as it would not save enough money. The notice was published on 13 December 1968 with a closure date of 5 May 1969. The increase in subsidy was found by an economist at the Ministry of Transport to be an error caused by an incorrect assumption. This attempt at closure was rejected in December 1972.

External image
- Single line key token for Romford–Upminster

The Victoria Road goods station closed on 4 May 1970 and the gravel pit private siding sometime after. The line operated the no-signalman key token system until 1973 and then one train staff working until 1986. By the late 1970s the service was operated by Cravens DMUs. At the end of diesel operation there were 31 journeys each way every day, except Sundays and public holidays when there was no service.

=== Electric era ===
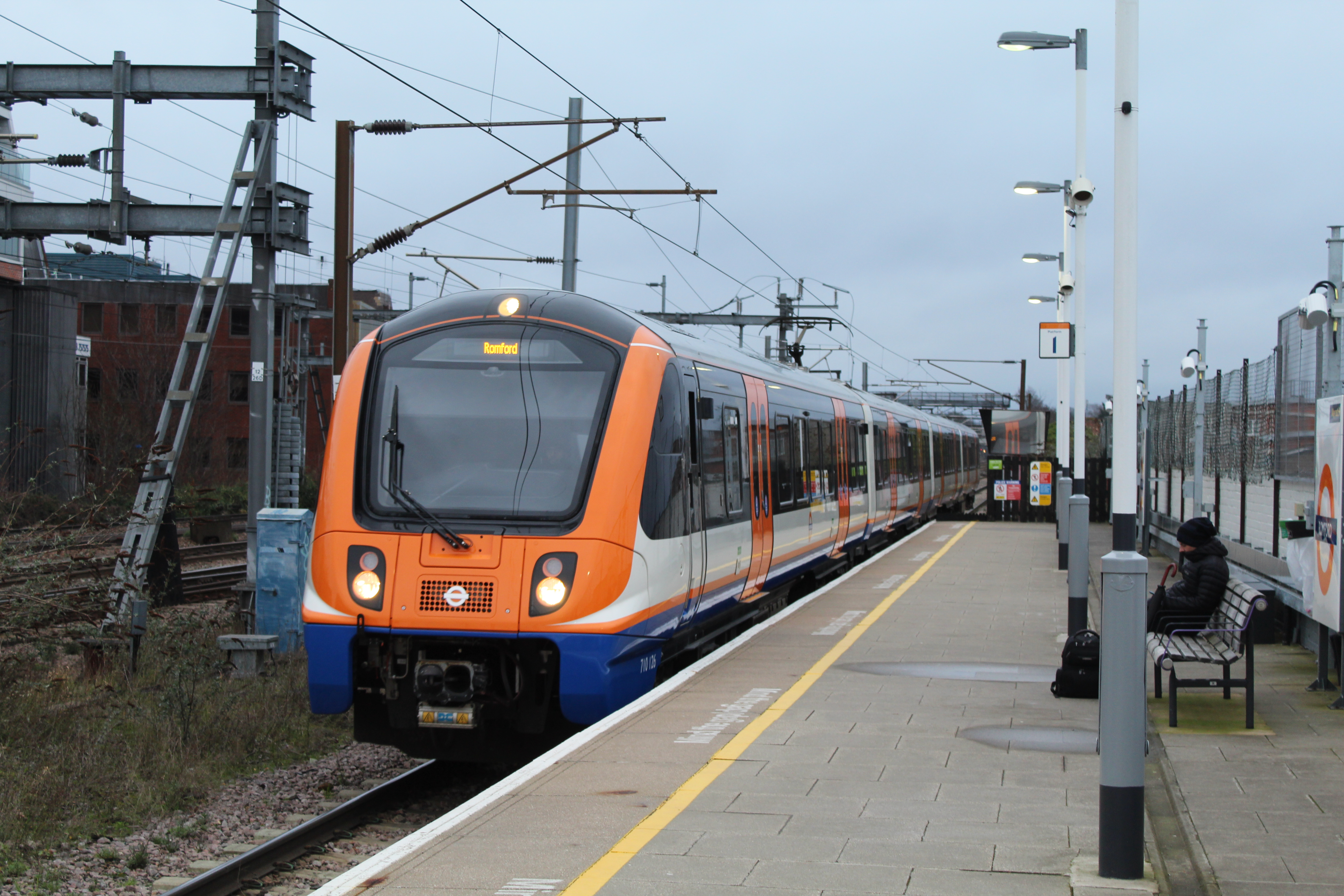
Class 710 train arrives at Romford

Electrification of the line at a cost of £303,000 (equivalent to £986,880 in 2025) was announced in September 1984. The line was one of the last in the region with DMU operation and electrification was done primarily to eliminate the expense of operating an isolated diesel service. It was electrified with 25 kV 50 Hz AC in October and November 1985. Electric multiple unit service began operating on 17 April 1986. The service level remained similar to the diesel timetable introduced in 1956. The line was changed to one train working without staff operation in December 1986. In 1990, the line was worked by a Class 321 unit.

Following the privatisation of British Rail, passenger services were operated by First Great Eastern from 1997 to 2004. Under this franchise, Class 315 units were used. It was then operated by National Express East Anglia from 2004 to 2012 and Greater Anglia from 2012. The line was transferred to Transport for London (TfL) control on 31 May 2015 and become part of the London Overground network. TfL anticipated that a single new train would be required to work the line. Suffering from a shortage of stock, the London Overground leased two Class 321 units from London Midland in 2015. Sunday service was restored from the December 2015 timetable. In 2017, Class 317 units were being used. Class 315 trains were withdrawn on 4 October 2020 and services were then operated by Class 710 rolling stock.

=== Incidents ===
On 8 October 1951, the 8.28 am train from Upminster hit the buffers in fog at Romford. Four people were treated for shock. On 2 November 1953, four people were injured, with one taken to hospital for a cut, when the 8.09 am train from Upminster hit the buffers at Romford.

== Naming ==
Liberty line signage at Romford

The Romford–Upminster line became a self-contained service in 1951, when through trains beyond Upminster were eliminated. After incorporation into the London Overground in May 2015, TfL timetables showed the service as the Romford to Upminster route. In 2015, TfL were considering naming the six London Overground lines and the Emerson line was proposed for the Romford–Upminster service before the idea was abandoned. In July 2023, TfL announced that it would be giving each of the London Overground services unique names by the end of the following year. In February 2024, it was confirmed that the Romford–Upminster service would be named the Liberty line "to reference the historical independence of the people of the borough of Havering" and would be coloured grey on the updated network map. The name references the Royal Liberty of Havering and the wider freedom that is a "defining feature of London". The Havering liberty was an independent administrative division established in 1465 that included Romford and Hornchurch. The new name took effect in November 2024.

== Infrastructure ==
Geographic network map shows the Liberty line is not connected to the other London Overground services

The 3-mile-30-chain-long (5.4 km) line, that is entirely within the London Borough of Havering, is part of the Network Rail Anglia route. It has a loading gauge of W6 and a maximum speed of 30 mph (48 km/h). Authorised in 1883 as a double-track railway, the line was built as single track. There is a brick underline bridge across the River Ingrebourne. Three brick overbridges at Victoria Road, Brentwood Road and Butts Green Road date from 1893. There is a pedestrian level crossing at Osborne Road.

=== Stations ===
At Romford there is interchange with the Elizabeth line and a connection to the Great Eastern Main Line. The LTSR station was on the east side of South Street, directly opposite the GER station entrance. A covered footbridge was provided to connect the stations, but it was closed unless an LTSR train was due. In April 1934 the two stations were combined and access to the platform was via the footbridge. There is only one intermediate station, at Emerson Park, which is located 1 mile 64 chains (2.9 km) from Romford. In the year 2017/18 there were over 300,000 passenger entries and exits at Emerson Park, more that three times the number 10 years previously, but still a small enough number for the line to come top of the list of least busy London Overground stations. A run-round loop was constructed 500 yards (457 m) west of Emerson Park in 1909 to enable short runs between Emerson Park and Upminster. It ceased to be used in 1934. At Upminster there are passenger interchanges with c2c and the London Underground. The Romford–Upminster service has used its own approach track and platform since 1957. The track connection to the London, Tilbury and Southend line was removed in 1968. Between 1932 and 1957 the Romford–Upminster service shared a platform with the District line. A third platform at Upminster was used by the service until 1932. An engine shed at Upminster was closed and demolished in September 1956.

| Station | Location | Notes | References |
|---|---|---|---|
| Romford | 51.5749°N 0.1841°E | Opened 1893 | |
| Romford Victoria Road | 51.5772°N 0.1933°E | Good station opened 1896 and closed 1970. Renamed from Romford in 1949. | |
| Brentwood Road | 51.5746°N 0.2021°E | Unbuilt proposal | |
| Emerson Park | 51.5687°N 0.2204°E | Proposed in 1893 and opened 1909 | |
| Wingletye Lane | 51.5624°N 0.2332°E | Unbuilt proposal | |
| Upminster | 51.5595°N 0.2511°E | Existing station opened 1885 | |

=== Map ===
The route of the Liberty line

== Services ==
All services are operated by London Overground. The line is entirely within London fare zone 6. As of May 2026, the service pattern is one train every 30 minutes between approximately 6:15 am and 10 pm Mondays to Saturdays, and approximately 8:30 am and 8 pm on Sundays. The journey time from one terminus to the other is timetabled as nine minutes. The typical off-peak service pattern in trains per hour (tph) is:

Liberty line
| Route | tph | Calling at |
|---|---|---|
| Romford to Upminster | 2 | Emerson Park |

Annualised entry/exit data from TfL for London Overground trips is as follows: (Note: Separate entry/exit data for London Overground passengers is not available for Romford and Upminster from 2022 onwards.)

| Station | 2017 | 2018 | 2019 | 2020 | 2021 | 2022 | 2023 | 2024 | 2025 |
|---|---|---|---|---|---|---|---|---|---|
| Emerson Park | 275,227 | 282,798 | 322,550 | 119,939 | 183,964 | 256,897 | 273,840 | 323,110 | 299,152 |
| Romford | 676,281 | 612,231 | 638,445 | 289,814 | 413,924 | — | — | — | — |
| Upminster | 605,174 | 541,652 | 596,487 | 232,361 | 318,551 | — | — | — | — |

In addition to through services to Grays and Tilbury that operated between 1893 and 1951, there was a daily Pitsea–Laindon–Romford service from c. 1910 to 1923.
