= Rivers of London =

Rivers of London may refer to

- Blue Ribbon Network, a policy element of the London Plan relating to the navigable waterways of London
- Rivers of London (novel), a 2011 urban fantasy novel by Ben Aaronovitch
  - Rivers of London (book series), a novel series based on the Aaronovitch novel
- Subterranean rivers of London

== See also ==
- Category:Rivers of London
