= Emerson Park =

Suburban neighbourhood in East London

Coordinates: 51.5741°N 0.2304°E

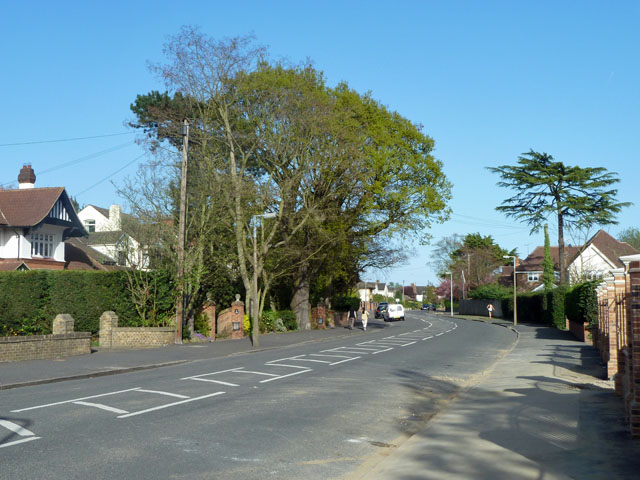
- Parkstone Avenue in the Emerson Park estate

- Location within Greater London
- Population: 11,977 (Emerson Park ward 2011)
- OS grid reference: TQ545885
  - Charing Cross: 15 mi (24 km) WSW
- London borough: Havering
- Ceremonial county: Greater London
- Region: London
- Country: England
- Sovereign state: United Kingdom
- Post town: HORNCHURCH
- Postcode district: RM11
- Dialling code: 01708
- Police: Metropolitan
- Fire: London
- Ambulance: London
- UK Parliament: Hornchurch and Upminster
- London Assembly: Havering and Redbridge

Emerson Park is a suburban neighbourhood in the London Borough of Havering, east London. The neighbourhood developed as two large housing estates built on the 550 acres (2.2 km^{2}) estate of Nelmes manor in the parish of Hornchurch. Emerson Park estate to the south started construction in 1895 and Great Nelmes estate to the north was begun in 1901. It is located north of the Romford–Upminster line and a station opened at Emerson Park in 1909. The mansion of Nelmes survived until it was demolished in 1967 to avoid preservation by the Civic Amenities Act and was replaced with a small housing estate called The Witherings. Emerson Park is located 15 miles (24.1 km) northeast of Charing Cross in Central London.

== History ==
=== Toponymy ===
Emerson Park is named after Emerson, the eldest son of William Carter of Parkstone, Dorset who bought land in the area for property development in 1895. Prior to suburban housebuilding, it was the manor of Nelmes which was recorded as Elmes in 1333.

=== Economic development ===
The railway came to the parish of Hornchurch with the Great Eastern Railway opening a station at Harold Wood in 1868 and the London, Tilbury and Southend Railway at Hornchurch in 1885. Both were some distance from the village of Hornchurch. The London, Tilbury and Southend built a branch line from Upminster to Romford in 1893 which skirted the southern boundary of Nelmes manor. A station, initially called Emerson Park and Great Nelmes Halt, was opened on 1 October 1909. The London, Tilbury and Southend became part of the Midland Railway in 1912.

In 1899 the Emerson Park Stores opened and the Chequers Inn was rebuilt. The Emerson Park Stores was converted to a club for the Hornchurch Liberal association, with an official opening on 16 June 1910.

=== Residential estates ===
In 1894 the Nelmes estate, in the parish of Hornchurch, is listed as comprising two houses, three farms, market gardens and other land, totalling 550 acres (2.2 km^{2}).

In 1895 the southern part of Nelmes manor, comprising 200 acres (0.81 km^{2}), was sold by Benjamin H Newman to William Carter. In the next ten years 200 homes of the Emerson Park Estate were constructed by Homesteads Limited. The houses were large, detached and typically situated on plots of an acre. There was some variety in the houses and the original sales prices ranged from £300 to £1,000.

In 1901 the northern portion of Nelmes manor, comprising 241 acres (0.98 km^{2}), was sold for the Great Nelmes Estate. Louis Sinclair, the local MP, was listed as tenant of the mansion.

The estates were subject to restrictive covenants which prevented an increased density of housing. In 1930 a development of 76 homes on the Wych Elm Farm was proposed which would have a density of nine semi-detached homes per acre and would be sold at £1,000 per pair. This was opposed by residents of the Emerson Park and Great Nelmes estates. The arbitration of the case resulted in detached properties of six per acre sold at £650 facing the Emerson Park estate to the west and semi-detached properties at the higher density to the east.

=== Nelmes manor house ===
Nelmes manor house was built by in 1540 by William Roche, who was Lord Mayor of London. Roche had purchased two manors in Havering that had been held separately, Gobions in Romford and Nelmes in Hornchurch. Nelmes was held by the Roche family and then sold to the politician Robert Naunton in the 1620s. The manor was held by the Naunton family and then sold to the postal administrator Thomas Witherings around 1646.

The Nelmes mansion and about three acres of grounds, sandwiched between the two housing estates, were sold in 1903 to Alfred Barber. He sold it in 1925 to John H. Platford and it was inherited by Roy Platford in 1966. The house was demolished by Platford in 1967 to avoid a preservation order by the Greater London Council as part of the incoming Civic Amenities Act 1967. The land was used for The Witherings neo-Georgian style housing development. Part of the moat appears to have been retained. Capel Nelmes, a 16th century outbuilding, survived and was grade II listed in 1972. The 17th century conduit house which provided water to Nelmes also survives and was grade II listed in 1974.

== Governance ==
Emerson Park is a ward for elections to Havering London Borough Council. The wards were redrawn for the 2022 election and since then two councillors are elected.

Emerson Park is part of the Hornchurch and Upminster Parliamentary constituency and the Havering and Redbridge London Assembly constituency.

== Geography ==
Emerson Park is located approximately 0.6 miles (1.0 km) northeast of Hornchurch town centre and 15 miles (24.1 km) northeast of Charing Cross in Central London. It is part of the RM11 postcode district in the Hornchurch post town. The Emerson Park electoral ward revision in 2022 more closely approximates the neighbourhood, by removing land north of the A127 Southend Arterial Road and west of The Ravensbourne.

== Transport ==
Emerson Park railway station is on Romford–Upminster line with a half-hourly London Overground service. The short branch line provides links to Romford for connection to the Elizabeth line and Great Eastern Main Line and to Upminster for connection to the District line of the London Underground and the London, Tilbury and Southend line. Emerson Park is served by London Buses routes 193, 256 and 370.

== See also ==
- List of schools in the London Borough of Havering
