= Ingrebourne Valley =

Nature reserve in London, England

Coordinates: 51.538°N 0.210°E

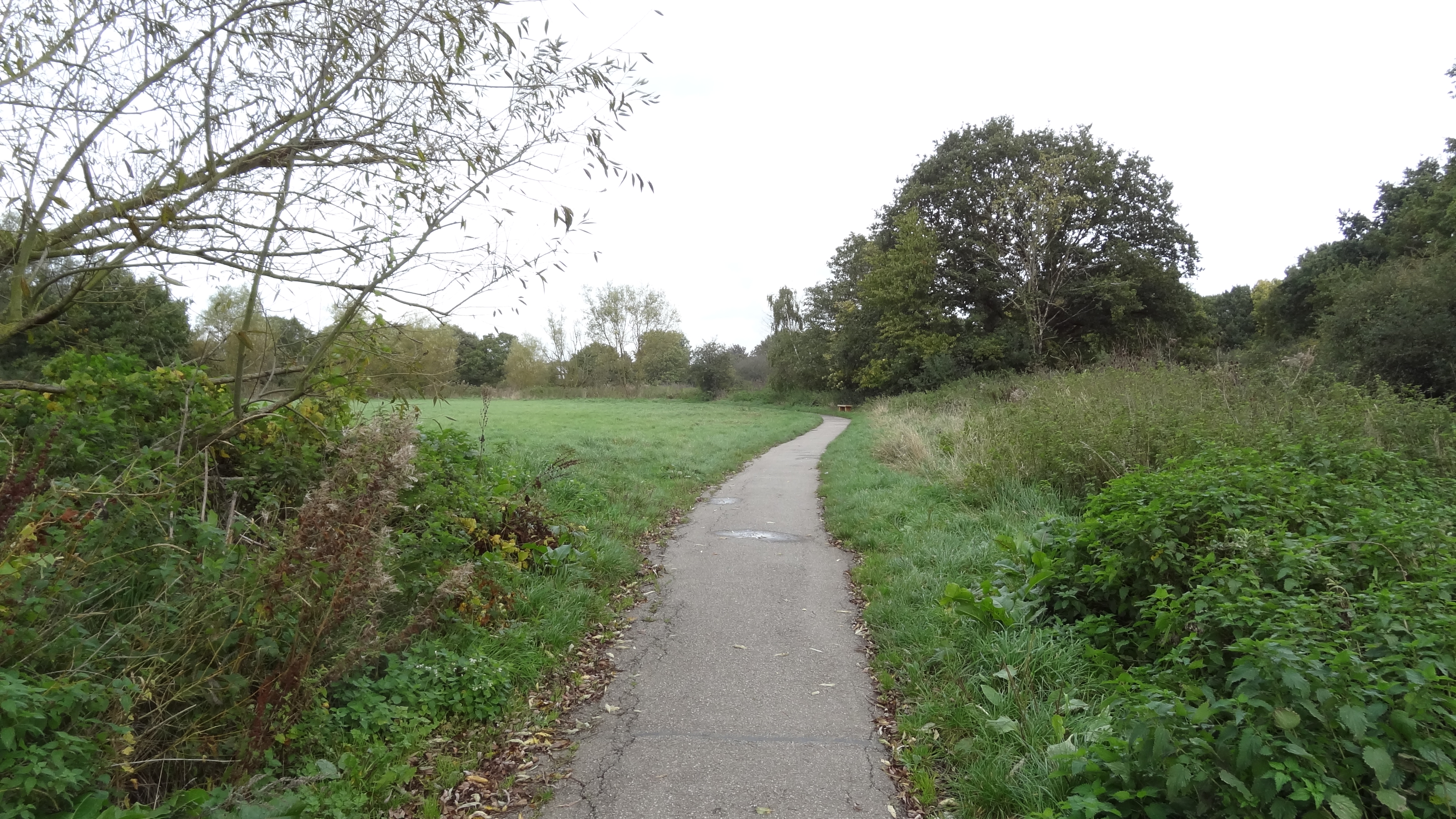
Ingrebourne Valley

Ingrebourne Valley is a local nature reserve (LNR) in Hornchurch in the London Borough of Havering. It is owned and managed by Havering Council, and has a visitor centre managed by the Essex Wildlife Trust. Most of it is in Hornchurch Country Park west of the River Ingrebourne, but there are also areas north and south of the park which are part of the LNR. It has a wide range of habitats, including woodland, grassland, the river and marshes. It is an important site for a range of species of plants, animals and birds, including great crested newts, slow worms, the harvest mouse and the water vole.

It has a complicated relationship with other nature reserves in the area. Hornchurch Country Park is a Site of Borough Importance for Nature Conservation, Grade I, and Ingrebourne Valley Site of Metropolitan Importance for Nature Conservation has different boundaries from the LNR of the same name, lying east, north and south of the country park. Part of the LNR is also in the Ingrebourne Marshes Site of Special Scientific Interest.

The site has a car park at its northern end off Hacton Lane.
