= Midland Railway 1833 Class =

Midland Railway 1833 class
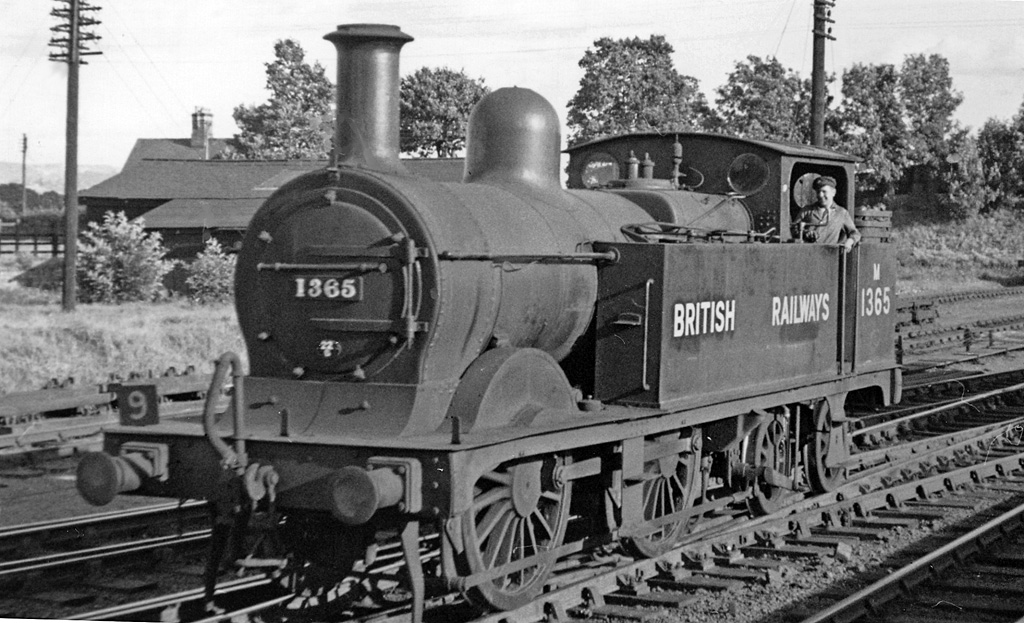
- 1833 Class No. M1365 at Ashchurch, 1949
Type and origin
- Power type: Steam
- Designer: Samuel Johnson
- Builder: Dübs & Co. (20); Neilson & Co. (10)
- Serial number: Dübs: 2847–2866; Neilson: 4607–16
- Build date: 1892–1893
- Total produced: 30
Specifications
- Configuration
  - Whyte: 0-4-4T
  - UIC: B2′ n2t
- Gauge: 4 ft 8 1/2 in (1,435 mm) standard gauge
- Driver dia.: 5 ft 3 in (1.600 m)
- Trailing dia.: 3 ft 0 1/2 in (0.927 m)
- Fuel type: Coal
- Cylinders: Two, inside
- Valve gear: Stephenson
- Valve type: Slide valves
Career
- Operators: Midland Railway; → London, Midland and Scottish Railway; → British Railways
- Power class: 1P
- Numbers: New:1833–1842, 2013–2022 (Dubs) and 2218–2227 (Neilson); 1907: 1351–1380; 1948 (14): 58059–58072
- Locale: London Midland Region
- Withdrawn: 1928–1959
- Disposition: All scrapped

The Midland Railway 1833 Class was a class of thirty 0-4-4T steam locomotives. They are sometimes included with the earlier 1823 Class or the later 2228 Class.

== Construction ==
Originally built in two batches: numbers 1833–1842 and 2013–2022 were built in 1892 by Dübs and Company and 2218–2227 in 1893 by Neilson and Company. The 2228 Class followed in 1895. In the 1907 Midland Railway renumbering scheme these became numbers 1351–1380. They retained their numbers through the LMS period.

Table of orders and numbers
Original No.	1907 (& LMS) No.	Manufacturer	Works Nos.	Qty	Year	Notes
1833–1842	1351–1360	Dübs & Co.	2847–2856	10	1892	
2013–2022	1361–1370	Dübs & Co.	2857–2866	10	1892	
2218–2227	1371–1380	Neilson & Co.	4607–4616	10	1893	

== BR Service ==
Fourteen survived to be inherited by BR in 1948; numbers 1353/57/58/60/65–68/70/71/73/75/77/79. In March 1948 BR allocated them the numbers 58059–58072 to make room for LMS Ivatt Class 2 2-6-2T locomotives, but only eleven actually received their new numbers.

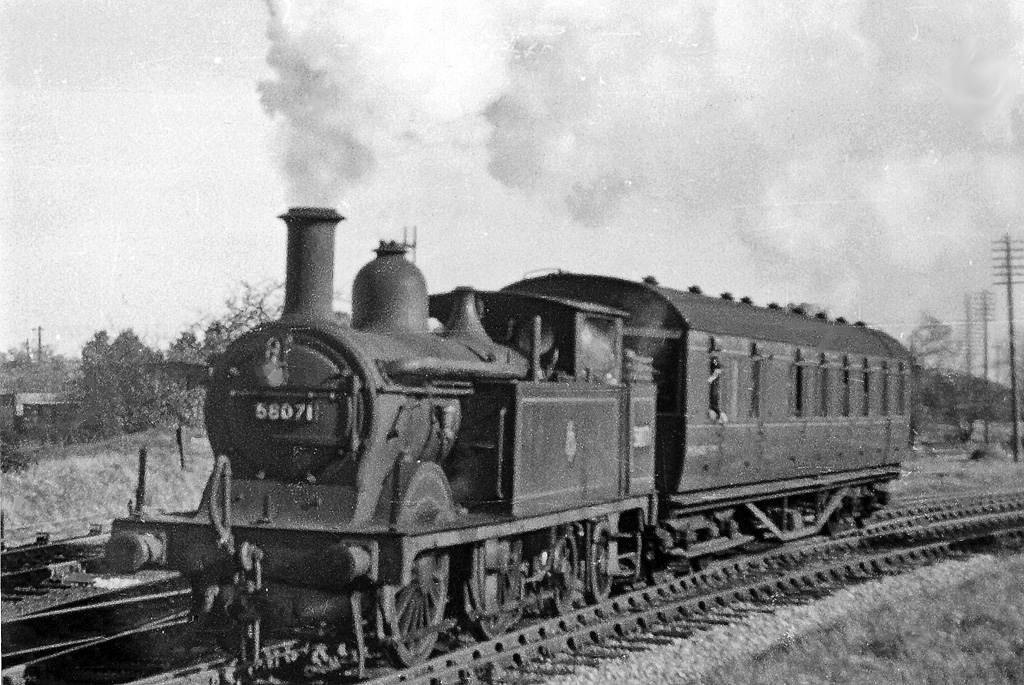
58071 with the Johnson boiler and condensing gear. Ashchurch - Tewkesbury - Great Malvern line in 1951.

They were built with typical Midland-pattern Johnson boilers with the flared safety valve housing. Some were later rebuilt with LMS pattern boilers with a Belpaire firebox and smaller pop valves. Some had condensing gear fitted for working the 'Widened Lines' tunnels of the Metropolitan Railway.

== Withdrawal ==
They were all withdrawn between 1928 and 1959. None has been preserved.

Table of withdrawals
Year	Quantity in service at start of year	Quantity withdrawn	Locomotive numbers	Notes
1928	30	1	1359	
1929	29	0	–	
1930	29	2	1362, 1372	
1931	27	1	1352	
1932	26	0	–	
1933	26	1	1351	
1934	25	0	–	
1935	25	2	1354, 1356	
1936	23	3	1355, 1369, 1376	
1937	20	1	1362	
1938	19	1	1364	
1939–45	18	0	–	
1945	18	1	1378	
1946	17	3	1361, 1374, 1380	
1947–49	14	0	–	
1950	14	4	58059–61, 1366	
1951	10	1	1365	
1952	9	1	58069	
1953	8	3	1370, 58068/70	
1954–55	5	0	–	
1956	5	3	58062/71–72	
1957	2	0	–	
1958	2	1	58066	
1959	1	1	58065	
