= Ingrebourne Marshes =

Nature reserve in London, England

Coordinates: 51.530°N 0.207°E

- Site of Special Scientific Interest
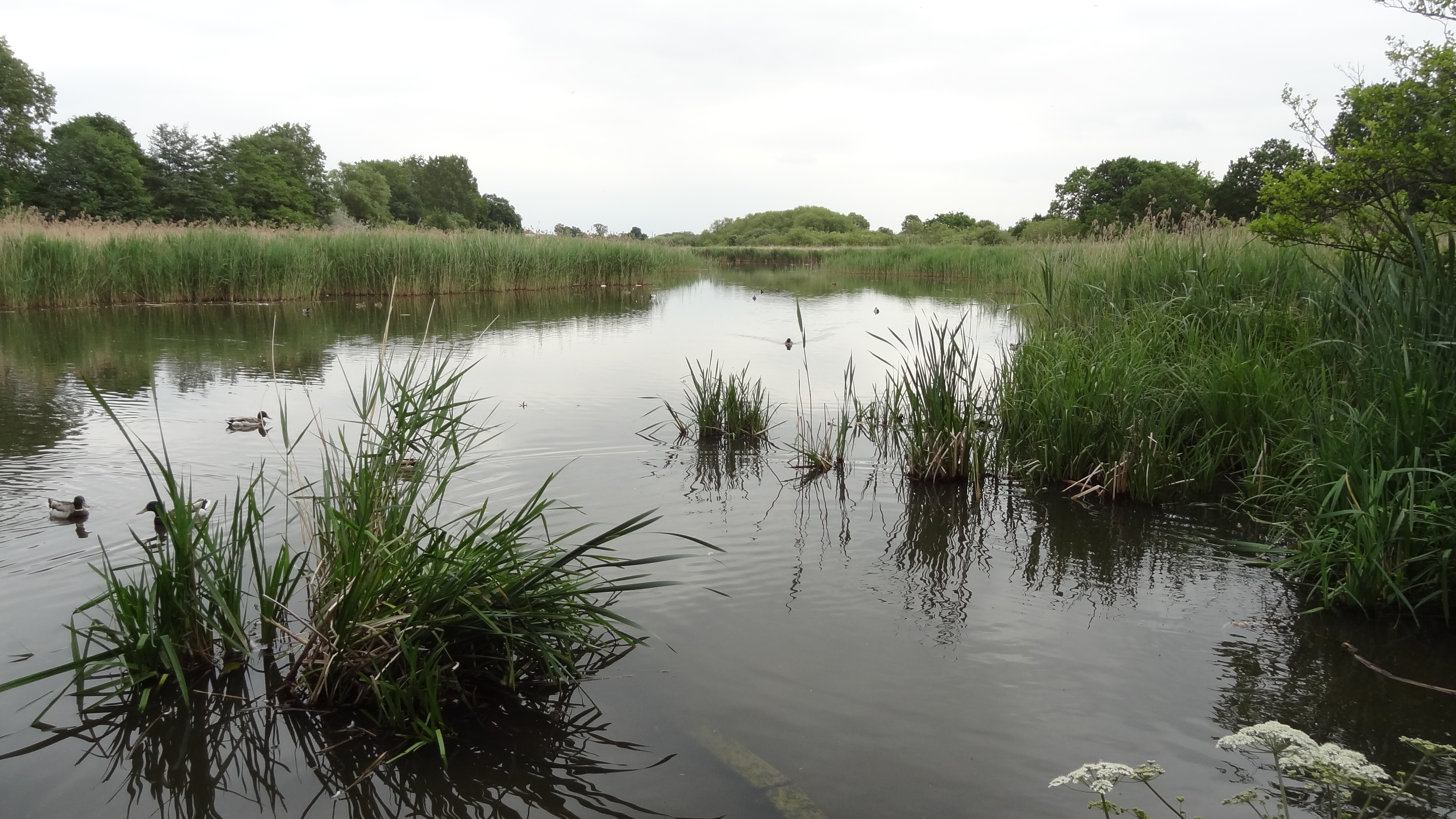
- Berwick Pond
- Location of Ingrebourne Marshes.
- Area of search: Greater London
- Grid reference: TQ532835
- Interest: Biological
- Area: 74.8 ha (185 acres)
- Notification date: 1988
- Location map: Magic Map

Ingrebourne Marshes are a 74.8 hectare biological Site of Special Scientific Interest in Hornchurch in the London Borough of Havering. Ingrebourne Valley Local Nature Reserve includes a small part of the SSSI west of the River Ingrebourne.

The Marshes run along both sides of the river, the northern portion next to Hornchurch Country Park and stretching south to Rainham. This is almost all closed to the public, but part of it can be viewed from the Park. A long narrow strip stretches east from the river to Berwick Pond Road, incorporating Berwick Pond, a reservoir which is used for fishing. This is open to the public. The site also includes an irrigation reservoir east of Berwick Pond Road.

The site is the largest area of freshwater marsh in Greater London. It is very diverse, with large areas of reed sweet-grass, common reed swamp, wet neutral grassland and tall fen. These habitats have a wide variety of invertebrates and breeding birds. Invertebrates include sixteen nationally scarce fly, beetle dragonfly and cricket species. There are two nationally rare Red Data Book species, the hoverfly Anasimyia interpuncta and the scarce emerald damselfly Lestes dryas. 61 species of bird regularly breed on the site, such as the common redshank and the northern lapwing. Common cuckoos exploit the nests of reed warblers and sedge warblers. Havering Council has raised the water level and reintroduced grazing to protect the wetland.

Access to the site is from Hornchurch Country Park and Berwick Pond Road.

== See also ==
- List of Sites of Special Scientific Interest in Greater London
- Havering parks and open spaces
