= Hornchurch Country Park =

Park in East London, England

Coordinates: 51°32′21″N 0°12′30″E

Hornchurch Country Park is a 104.5-hectare park on the former site of Hornchurch Airfield, south of Hornchurch in the London Borough of Havering, east London.

== Site ==
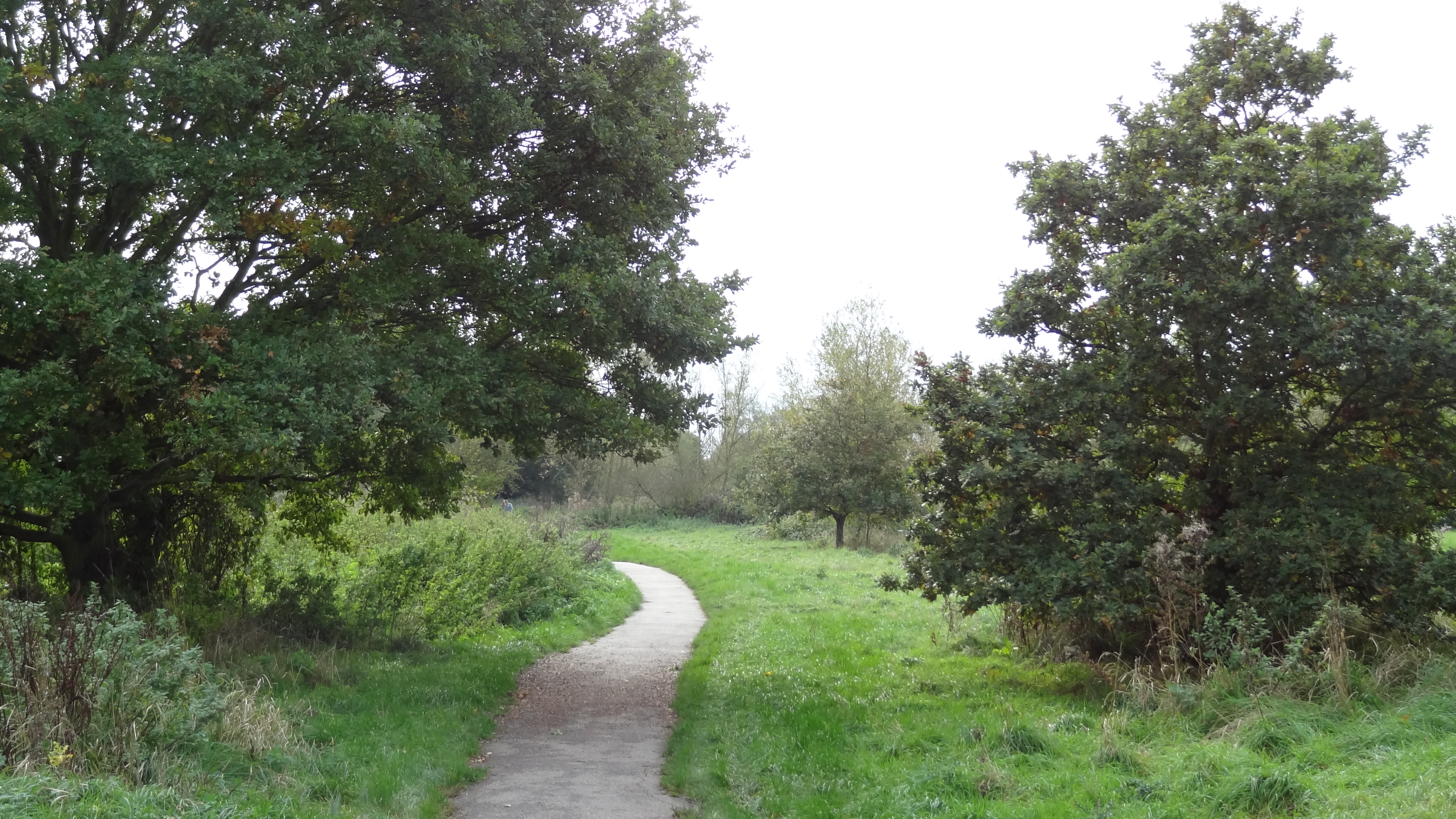

The River Ingrebourne passes through the park and if forms part of Thames Chase Community Forest. The most popular part of the park is to the west of the Ingrebourne, where the ground is flat and paved and frequently visited by dog walkers. The woodland to the east of the river is somewhat inaccessible. Some southern parts of the park that reach into Rainham have been historically used as landfill.

There is a fishing lake located within the park alongside many paths that connect neighbouring areas, such as Upminster, Dagenham and Rainham.

There are a number of pillboxes and other historic installations dating from the Second World War to be found in the park.

The park is a Site of Borough Importance for Nature Conservation, Grade I. Almost all of it falls within the Ingrebourne Valley Local Nature Reserve, with the eastern edge forming part of the Ingrebourne Marshes Site of Special Scientific Interest.

There is access from Airfield Way/Squadron's Approach, off South End Road.

== COVID-19 Memorial Woodland ==
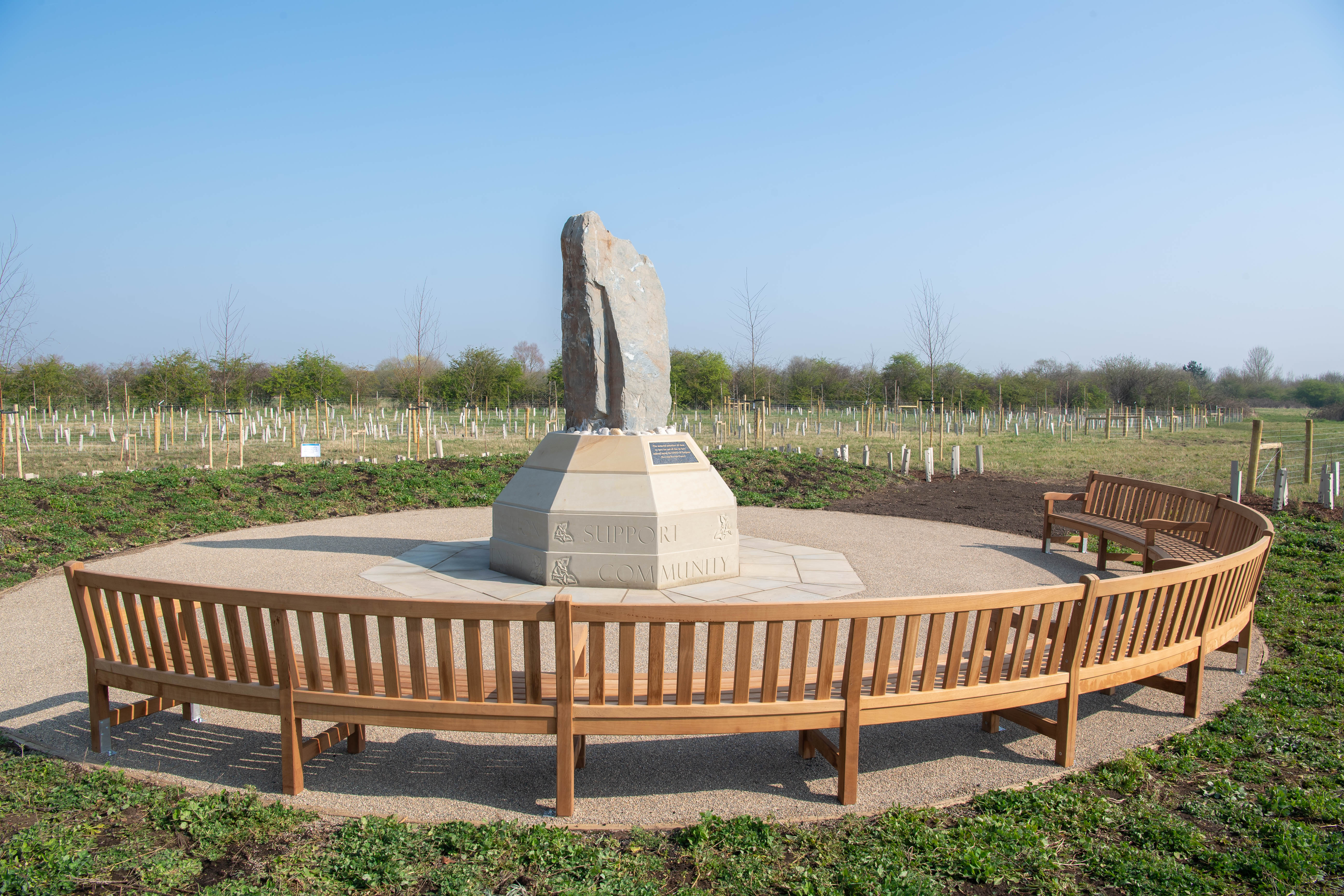
The central memorial area is surrounded by wildflowers and a 12m long bench.

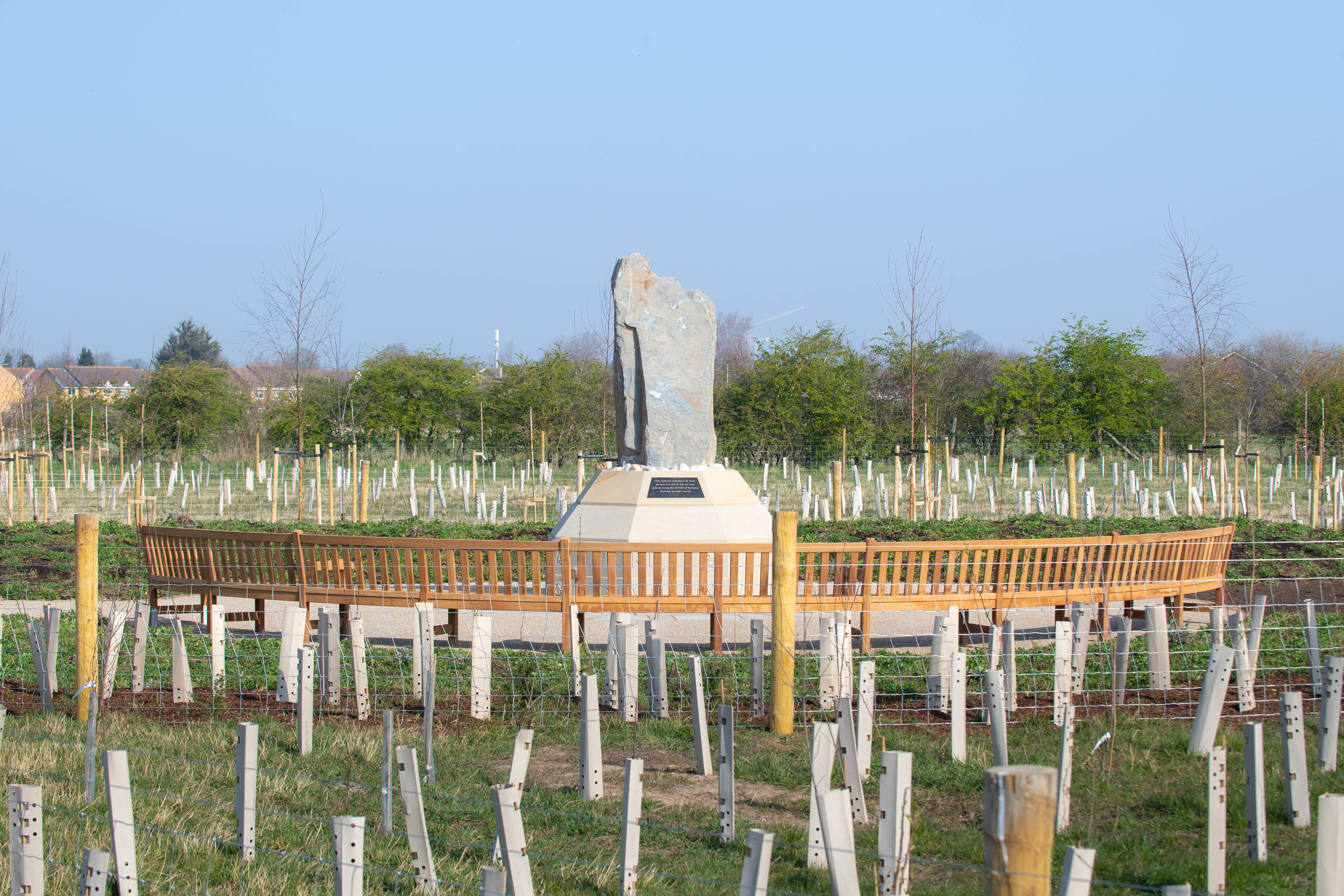
Over 4000 trees were planted surrounding the central memorial.

The Memorial Woodland is in the south of the park and consists of over 4000 trees planted by volunteers, alongside sponsored memorial benches, wildflowers and a wetland area. The woodland aims to remember all those who lost their lives during the COVID-19 pandemic, and recognise the significant efforts and sacrifices of key workers and Havering residents. The memorial is centrally located within the borough, acknowledging the role that parks played in supporting the mental and physical health of residents during lockdowns.

The woodland was opened at a ceremony on 23 March 2022, the National Day of Reflection marking the second anniversary of the first UK lockdown. The Mayor of Havering joined representatives of the council, borough, voluntary sector and families of the deceased.
