= Midland Railway 2228 Class =

Midland Railway 2228 class
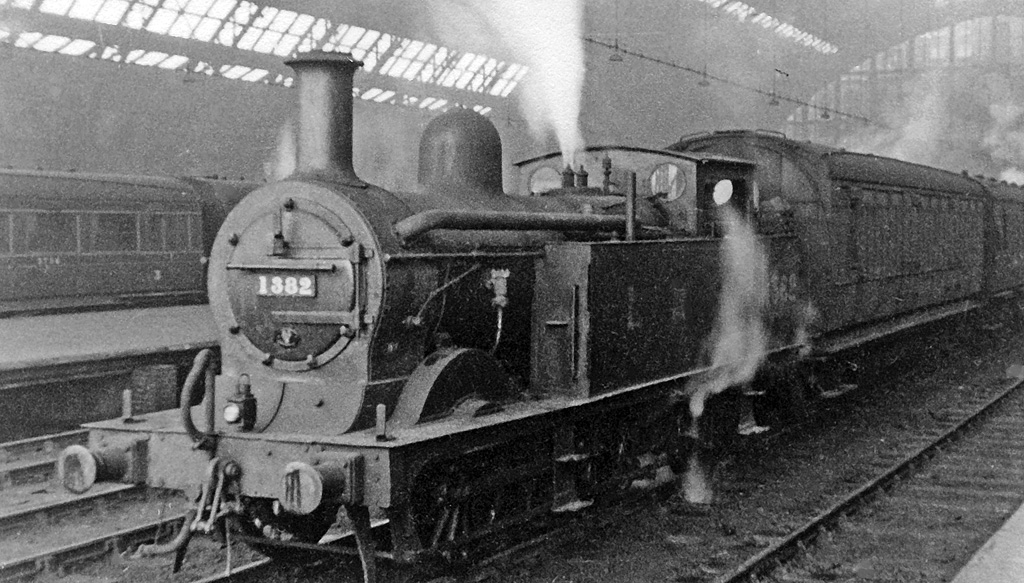
- LMS 1382 at St. Pancras, January 1948
Type and origin
- Power type: Steam
- Designer: Samuel Johnson
- Builder: Dübs & Co. (40); Derby Works (10)
- Order number: Derby: 1602
- Serial number: Dübs: 3200–3219, 3898–3917
- Build date: 1895–1900
- Total produced: 50
Specifications
- Configuration
  - Whyte: 0-4-4T
  - UIC: B2′ n2t
- Gauge: 4 ft 8 1/2 in (1,435 mm) standard gauge
- Driver dia.: 5 ft 3 1/2 in (1.613 m)
- Trailing dia.: 3 ft 0 1/2 in (0.927 m)
- Loco weight: 53 long tons 4 cwt (54.1 t; 59.6 short tons)
- Fuel type: Coal
- Boiler: MR type C1
- Boiler pressure: 150 lbf/in^{2} (1.03 MPa)
- Cylinders: Two, inside
- Cylinder size: 18 in × 24 in (457 mm × 610 mm)
- Valve gear: Stephenson
- Valve type: Slide valves
Performance figures
- Tractive effort: 15,490 lbf (68.90 kN)
Career
- Operators: Midland Railway; → London, Midland and Scottish Railway; → British Railways
- Power class: 1P
- Numbers: New: 2228–2247, 690–695, 780–783, 2611–2630; 1907: 1381–1430; 1948: 58073–58091
- Locale: London Midland Region
- Withdrawn: November 1930 – August 1960
- Disposition: All scrapped

The Midland Railway 2228 Class was a class of 0-4-4T side tank steam locomotive designed by Samuel Johnson. They were given the power classification 1P.

== Overview ==
They were a follow-on to the 1823 class of 1889–1893, and were the Midland's last order of 0-4-4T locomotive, though the LMS did build some class 2 0-4-4Ts in 1932/3.

A total of fifty were built: two batches of twenty from Dübs and Company of Glasgow, were separated by an order of 10 from Derby Works.

Table of orders and numbers
Original No.	1907 (& LMS) No.	Manufacturer	Works Nos.	Year	Notes
2228–2232	1381–1385	Dübs & Co.	3215–3219	1895	
2233–2247	1386–1400	Dübs & Co.	3200–3214	1895	
690–695	1401–1406	Derby Works	(order No. 1602)	1898	
780–783	1407–1410	Derby Works	(order No. 1602)	1898	
2611–2630	1411–1430	Dübs & Co.	3898–3917	1900	

All were in service at the 1907 renumbering, and all passed to the London, Midland and Scottish Railway at the 1923 Grouping. Withdrawals started in 1930, and twenty locomotives were still in LMS stock at the end of 1947, to be inherited by British Railways.

== Withdrawal ==
No. 1385 was withdrawn in January 1948, and in March the remaining nineteen (1382/89/90/96/97, 1402/06/11/13/16/20–26/29/30) were allocated the BR numbers 58073–58091, although four did not receive their BR numbers before their withdrawal. The last, 58087 was withdrawn in August 1960. All members of the class were scrapped.

Table of withdrawals
Year	Quantity in service at start of year	Quantity withdrawn	Locomotive numbers	Notes
1930	50	1	1419	
1931	49	5	1383/84/86/99, 1412	
1934	44	3	1388/98, 1414	
1935	41	5	1391, 1405/15/18/27	
1937	36	2	1400/10	
1938	34	3	1381/87/92	
1939	31	2	1394, 1417	
1944	29	1	1393	
1946	28	6	1395, 1401/03/07/09/28	
1947	22	2	1404/08	
1948	20	3	1385/89, 1413, 58080	
1949	17	1	1402	
1950	16	3	1406, 58082–83	
1953	13	4	58075–76/89–90	
1955	9	3	58077/85/88	
1956	6	3	58073/91	
1957	3	1	58084	
1959	2	1	58086	
1960	1	1	58087	
