= Hornchurch Cutting =

English Geological Site

Coordinates: 51.5636°N 0.2308°E

- Site of Special Scientific Interest
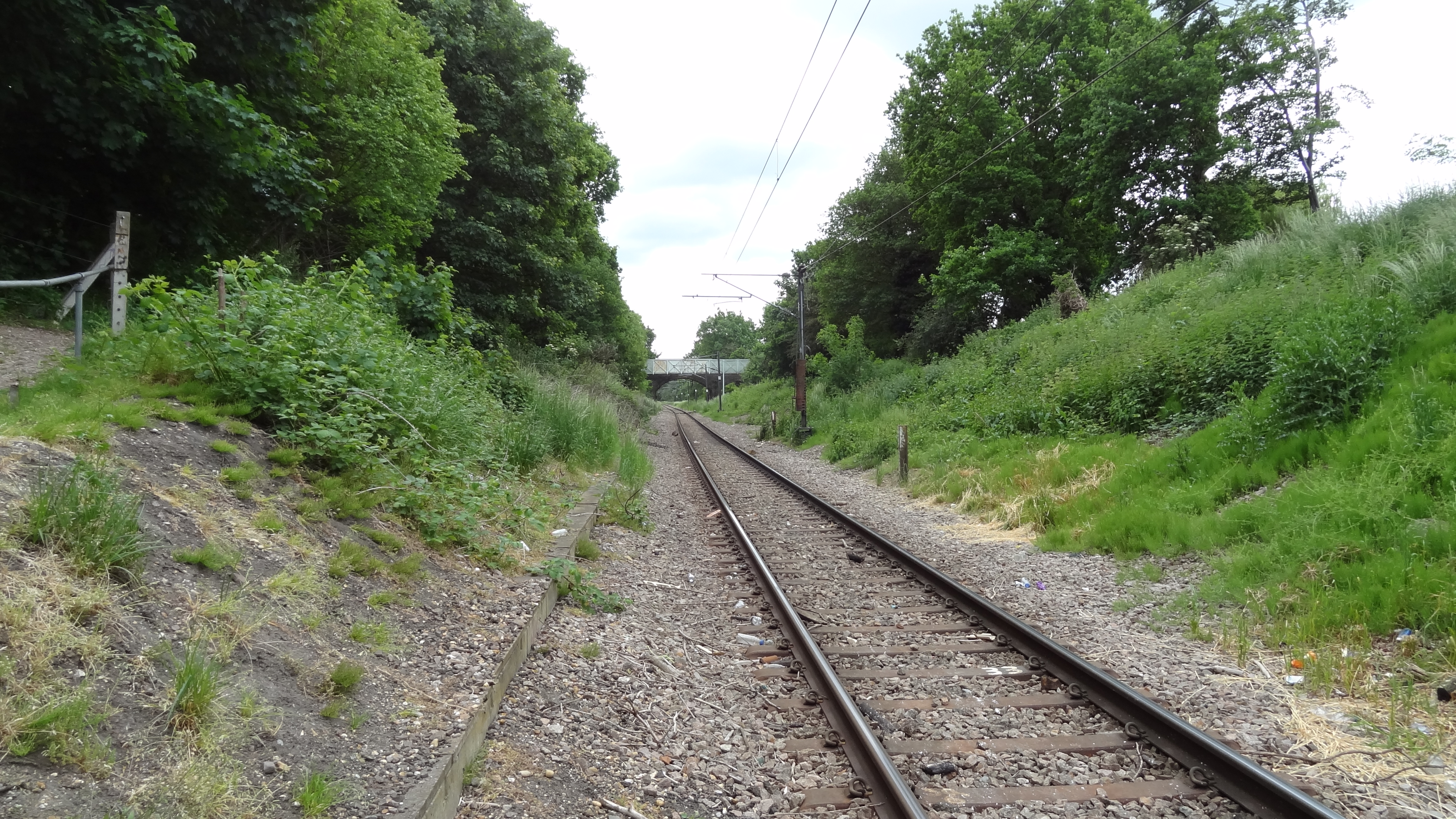
- Location of Hornchurch Cutting.
- Area of search: Greater London
- Grid reference: TQ547874
- Interest: Geological
- Area: 0.8 ha (2.0 acres)
- Notification date: 1988
- Location map: Magic Map

Hornchurch Cutting is a 0.8-hectare (2.0-acre) geological Site of Special Scientific Interest in Hornchurch in the London Borough of Havering. It is also a Geological Conservation Review site.

It is at the southern edge of the Anglian ice sheet 450,000 years ago, the most extreme ice age during the Pleistocene ice ages of the last 2.58 million years. (Technically, the most southerly point reached by an ice sheet during the Quaternary was The Dell, a few metres south of St Andrew's Church.) It is the type site for Hornchurch Till, boulder clay laid down by the ice sheet in the Ingrebourne Valley.

The site was discovered by geologist T. V. Holmes during construction of the Romford to Upminster railway line in 1892. He found a five-metre thickness of boulder clay overlaid by sand and gravel. An excavation in 1983 revealed extensive Jurassic fossils and rocks that had been carried from the Midlands by the ice sheet.

The site is very important for establishing the glacial stratigraphy of southern Britain. It featured briefly in the Channel 4 TV series Birth of Britain with Tony Robinson in 2011.

It is between Woodhall Crescent to the north and St Andrew's Park and Maywin Drive to the south.

== See also ==
- List of Sites of Special Scientific Interest in Greater London
