= Midland Railway 1823 Class =

Midland Railway 1823 class
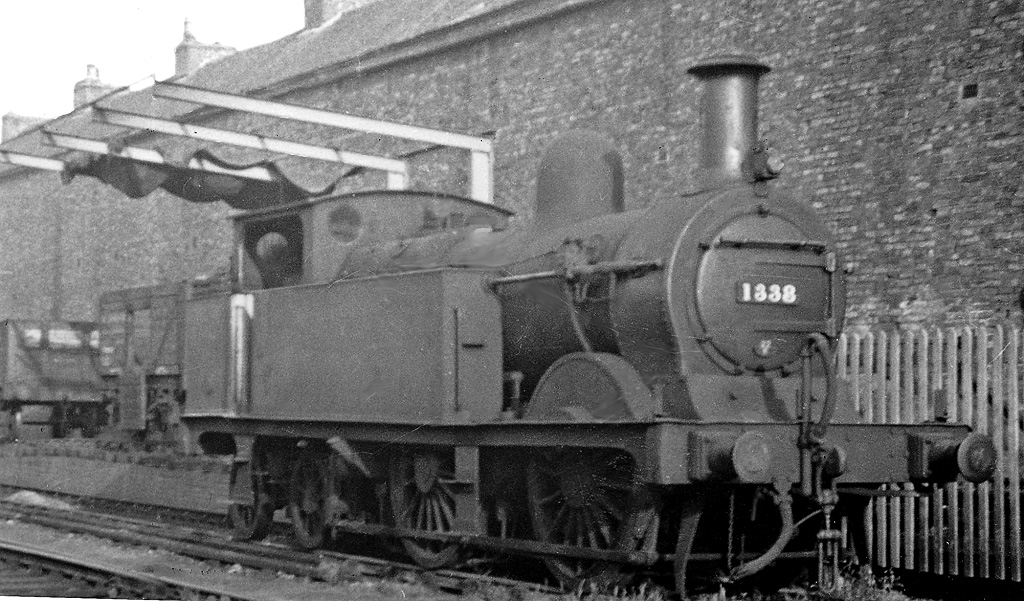
- 1338 at Tewkesbury, Gloucestershire in 1947.
Type and origin
- Power type: Steam
- Designer: S. W. Johnson
- Builder: Derby Works
- Order number: 763 and 981
- Build date: 1889 (10), 1892 (10)
- Total produced: 20
Specifications
- Configuration
  - Whyte: 0-4-4T
  - UIC: B2′ n2t
- Gauge: 4 ft 8 1/2 in (1,435 mm)
- Driver dia.: 5 ft 3 1/2 in (1.613 m)
- Trailing dia.: 3 ft 0 1/2 in (0.927 m)
- Wheelbase
  - Engine: 8 ft 0 in (2.438 m) +; 9 ft 9 in (2.972 m) +; 5 ft 0 in (1.524 m)
- Loco weight: 50 long tons 9 cwt (51.3 t)
- Fuel type: Coal
- Boiler
  - Model: Midland Railway class C
  - Diameter: 4 ft 1 in (1.24 m)
  - Tube plates: 10 ft 6 in (3.20 m)
- Boiler pressure: 160 lbf/in^{2} (1.10 MPa)
- Heating surface: 1,254 sq ft (116.5 m^{2})
- Cylinders: Two, inside
- Cylinder size: 18 in × 26 in (457 mm × 660 mm)
Career
- Operators: Midland Railway; London, Midland and Scottish Railway; British Railways
- Locale: London Midland Region
- Withdrawn: 1925, 1931–1937, 1946–1959
- Disposition: All scrapped

The Midland Railway 1823 Class was a class of twenty 0-4-4T steam locomotives. They had the power classification 1P.

== History ==
They were built in two batches of 10 each at Derby in 1889 and 1892. They were a development of the 1532 Class. The 1833 Class followed, and confusingly is sometimes grouped into this class.

Table of orders and numbers
Original No.	1907 (& LMS) No.	Manufacturer	Works Nos.	Qty	Year	Notes
1823–1832	1331–1340	Derby Works	(order No. 763)	10	1889	
1322–1326, 202, 1428–1430, 1697	1341–1350	Derby Works	(order no. 981)	10	1892	

Under the Midland Railway 1907 renumbering scheme, they were given the numbers 1331–1350. The London, Midland and Scottish Railway numbers were the same. Seven, numbers 1337/40–42/44/48/50 were inherited by British Railways in 1948. In March 1948 they were allocated the numbers 58052–58058 to create space in the ex-LMS numbering series for Ivatt Class 2 tank locomotives, but only five received their new number. All were withdrawn and scrapped.

Table of withdrawals
Year	Quantity in service at start of year	Quantity withdrawn	Locomotive numbers	Notes
1925	20	1	1335	
1931	19	7	1331–1333, 1336, 1339, 1345, 1349	
1934	12	1	1347	
1937	11	1	1343	
1946	10	1	1334	
1947	9	2	1338, 1346	
1948	7	1	1342	
1949	6	1	1348	
1951	5	1	58052	
1952	4	1	58058	
1953	3	1	58053	
1955	2	1	58054	
1959	1	1	58056	
