= St Andrew's Park =

Park in Hornchurch, London Borough of Havering

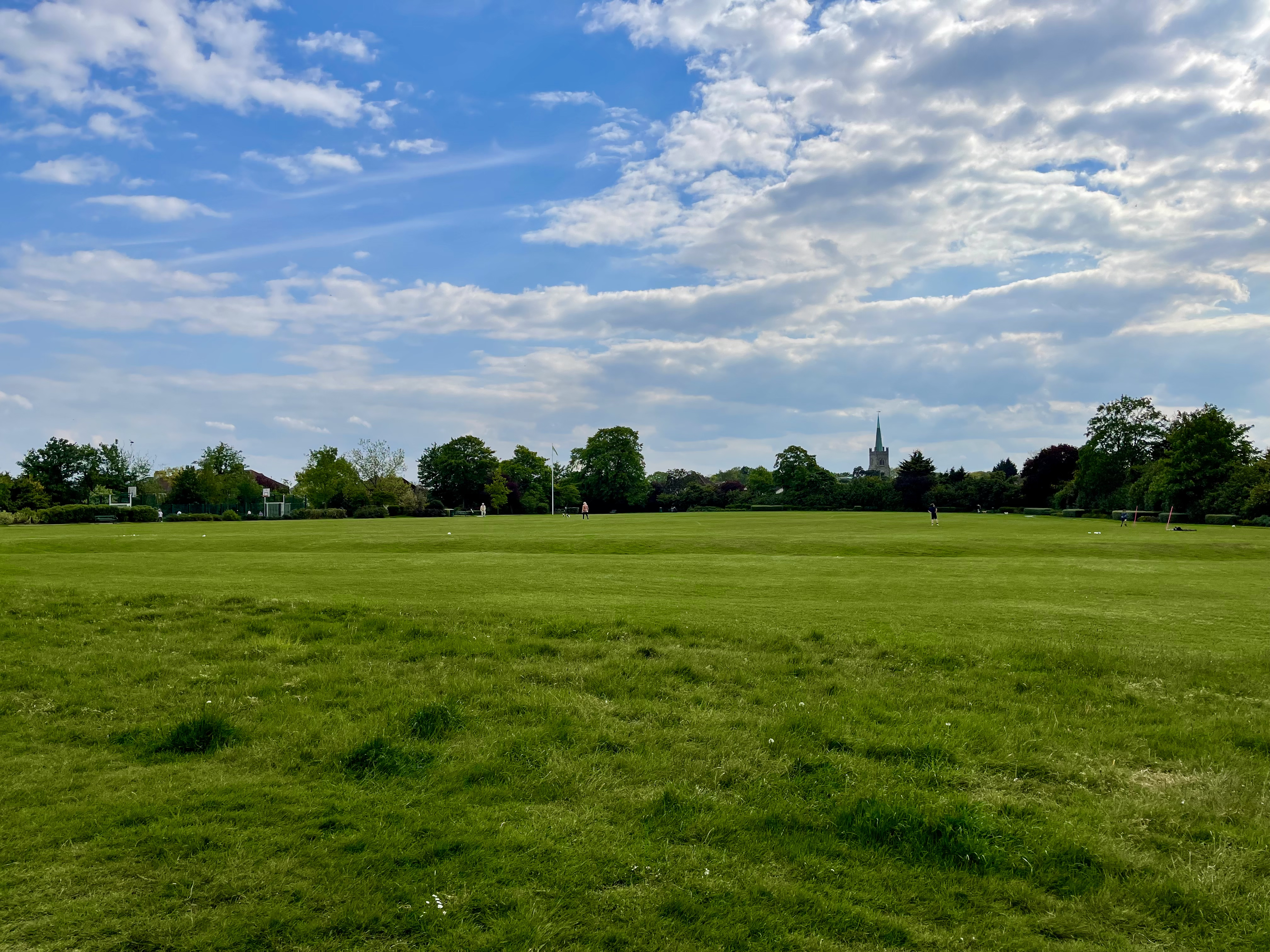
- Interactive map of St Andrew's Park
- Type: Public park
- Location: Hornchurch
- Coordinates: 51.563°N 0.228°E
- Operator: Havering London Borough Council
- Open: All year

St Andrew's Park is a public park in Hornchurch, in the London Borough of Havering. It is owned and managed by Havering London Borough Council.

== History ==
The purchase of the land for Village Recreation Ground by Hornchurch Urban District Council from New College, Oxford was signed on 27 March 1928. £438 was paid for 4.5 acres and a further three acres were gifted.

== Features ==
To the north of the park is the Hornchurch Cutting site of special scientific interest.

== Management ==
The park is owned and managed by Havering London Borough Council. The park has Green Flag Award status.
