= Blue Ribbon Network =

The Blue Ribbon Network is a policy element of the London Plan relating to the waterways of London, England.

Aside from the River Thames, the major components of the network are:

1. Grand Union Canal
2. Regent's Canal
3. River Lee Navigation
4. River Brent
5. River Roding
6. River Rom
7. River Crane
8. Beverley Brook
9. River Wandle
10. Ravensbourne River
11. Silk Stream
12. Pymmes Brook
13. Salmons Brook
14. Moselle Brook
15. Ingrebourne River
16. River Cray

The network also includes docks, reservoirs and lakes and covered over sections of rivers. The London Plan promotes the use of the waterways for leisure, passenger and tourist traffic, and the transport of freight and general goods. The canal part of the network makes up 90 kilometres (56 mi) of waterway. The London Waterways Commission advises the Mayor of London on the implementation of the waterways policies.
