= Weald Brook =

Coordinates: 51.6183°N 0.246392°E

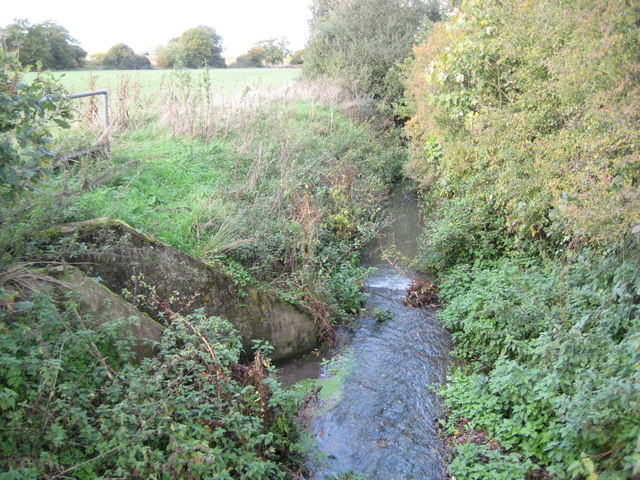
- North Weald Brook in North Weald Bassett

Location
- Country: England
- Counties: Greater London, Essex
- London boroughs: Havering

Weald Brook is a water course in the parliamentary constituency of Hornchurch and Upminster. Weald Brook flows into the River Ingrebourne.

Weald Brook is the boundary between Romford and South Weald, to the east, flows south into Hornchurch, continuing as the River Ingrebourne to the Thames.
