= Emerson Park railway station =

London Overground station

Emerson Park
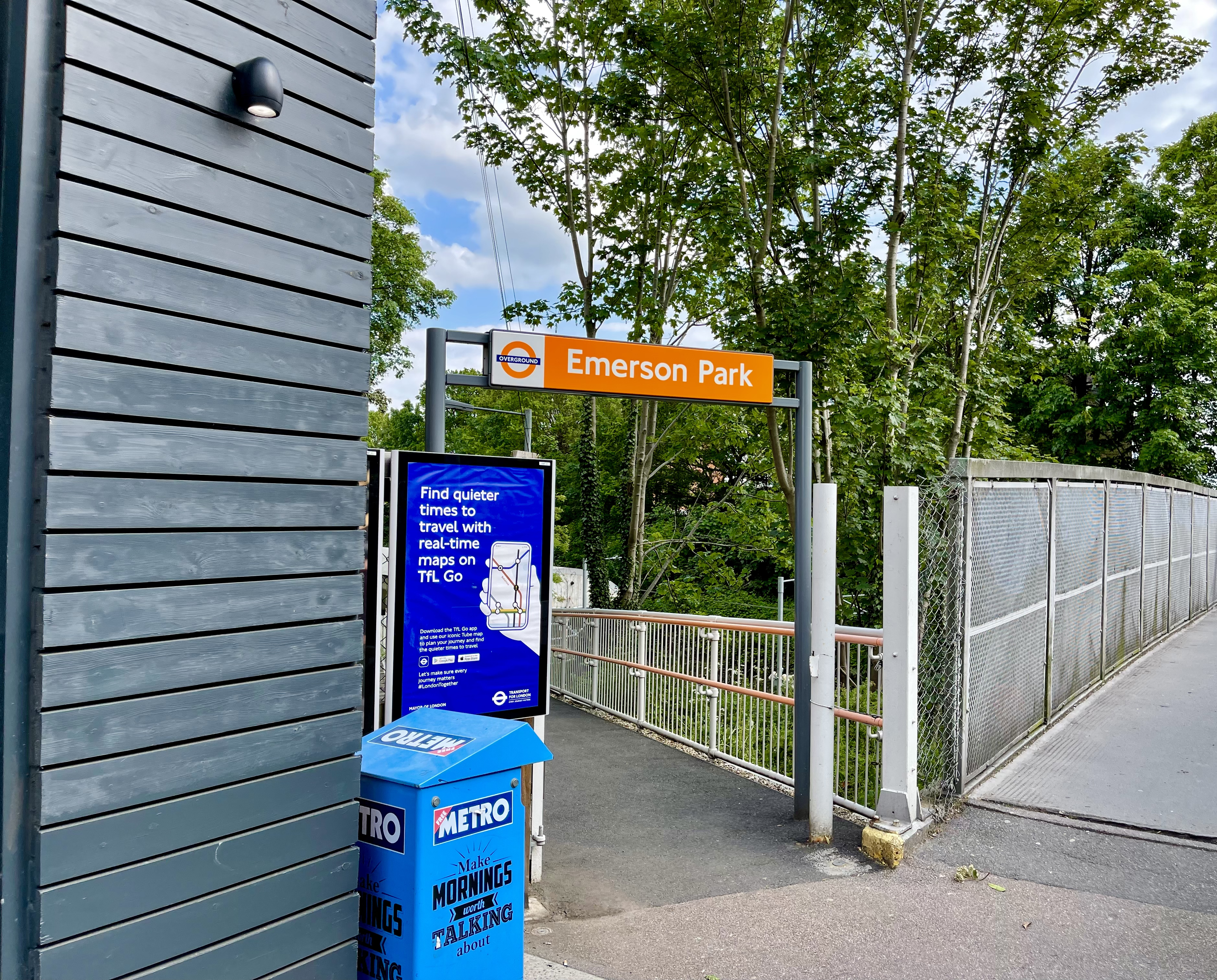
- Entrance on Butts Green Road

General information
- Location: Emerson Park, Havering
- Coordinates: 51.5687°N 0.2204°E
- Owner: Network Rail
- Manager: London Overground
- Platforms: 1

Construction
- Accessible: Yes

Other information
- Station code: EMP
- Fare zone: 6
- Classification: Category F2
- Website: Official website

History
- Opened: 1 October 1909
- Former names: Emerson Park Halt (1909–1968)
- Original company: London, Tilbury and Southend Railway
- Pre-grouping: Midland Railway
- Post-grouping: London, Midland and Scottish Railway

Passengers

National Rail annual entry and exit
- 2021–22: ▲0.196 million
- 2022–23: ▲0.240 million
- 2023–24: ▲0.305 million
- 2024–25: ▼0.303 million
- 2025–26: ▲0.333 million
Location
- Location in Havering

Emerson Park is a London Overground station on Butts Green Road, in the Emerson Park neighbourhood of the London Borough of Havering, East London. It is the only intermediate station on the single-track Liberty line, located between Romford and Upminster. It was opened in 1909 by the London, Tilbury and Southend Railway on a branch line which had connected Romford with Upminster and Grays since 1893. Service frequency was increased in 1934 with the introduction of push–pull operation. As part of the Beeching cuts, the station faced two attempts at closure in 1963 and 1968. It has minimal station buildings other than a canopy over the single platform. Emerson Park is one of the least used stations in London and the least used London Overground station. It is in London fare zone 6.

== History ==
Hornchurch was first served by the London, Tilbury and Southend Railway (LTSR) in 1885 with Hornchurch station located 1 mile south of the village. The LTSR opened a branch line from Romford to Upminster on 7 June 1893, connecting at Upminster with their main line to Fenchurch Street and branch line to Grays. The branch passed the northern limits of Hornchurch at Butts Green and a request for a station there was rejected by the LTSR board. Suburban property development followed to the northeast of the railway at the Emerson Park estate. The LTSR was prompted to open a station after the Great Eastern Railway (GER) proposed in 1908 to open a new railway station at Gidea Park, approximately 1 mile to the northwest on the line from Liverpool Street. The LTSR station opened on 1 October 1909 as Emerson Park Halt and the rival Squirrels Heath and Gidea Park station opened on 1 December 1910. To encourage passengers to travel via Upminster and not Romford, the LTSR would did not sell through season tickets via Romford. The GER provided a bus service from Emerson Park to their station. (Note: The bus service went to Romford until Gidea Park station opened.) The station was also known as Emerson Park and Great Nelmes Halt. To coincide with the opening, the number of Romford–Upminster services was increased and additional shuttle trains were provided between Emerson Park and Upminster. (Note: Four extra services between Romford and Upminster and fourteen Emerson Park to Upminster short runs were provided from 1909.) The LTSR was purchased by the Midland Railway (MR) in 1912. The number of weekday trains was increased to twenty by 1913, with Emerson Park and Upminster served by a total of 31 trains. Frequency was further increased in the 1920s, with around twenty-three services each way between Romford and Upminster and a further five at peak times between Emerson Park and Upminster. (Note: In the April 1920 timetable there are 27 down (towards Tilbury) and 22 up (towards Romford) trains a day. There were six through trains to Grays, four to Tilbury and five short runs between Emerson Park and Upminster, with a similar number of return trains. On Sundays there were nine trains in each direction.) The MR was amalgamated with other railways to create the London, Midland and Scottish Railway (LMS) on 1 January 1923.

Pressure from the Hornchurch Ratepayers' Association led to improvements in frequency, with push–pull train service commencing on 1 August 1934 and an improved timetable from October 1934. The service increased to 30 trains over the Romford–Upminster section on weekdays with five Emerson Park–Upminster short runs. Timings were irregular and seven services continued to Tilbury. This service pattern remained until the Second World War. Services were cut during the war, with Romford–Upminster reduced to twenty-one trains and Emerson Park–Upminster short runs reduced to two. The pre-war 30 trains service was restored in 1946. The station became part of British Railways on 1 January 1948, initially as part of the London Midland Region and then the Eastern Region from 20 February 1949. The short workings between Emerson Park and Upminster were eliminated with all services on the line calling at Upminster, Emerson Park and Romford from 1948. In 1950, through services beyond Upminster were eliminated except on Sundays. In 1951, during the Abadan Crisis, Romford–Upminster services were withdrawn between the peak periods, in the evenings, and on Sundays. (Note: The Saturday timetable also had a gap in service during the middle of the day.) This reduced daily services to sixteen on Mondays to Fridays and to twenty on Saturdays. Trial diesel multiple unit (DMU) operation began in April 1956, with a full diesel service commencing on 17 September 1956. Metro-Cammell Lightweight units and crew from Stratford replaced the steam service. The off-peak and evening services that had been removed in 1951 were restored and trains ran to a regular half-hourly timetable. (Note: Sunday service was not restored at that time.) There were now thirty trains a day in each direction.

The station was listed for closure, with the line, in the Beeching Report of March 1963. Passenger counts were undertaken between 29 June and 4 July 1963. There was organised public opposition to the closure with a public meeting held in July 1963. The formal closure application was made on 28 August 1963, with a proposed closure date of 4 January 1965. A replacement peak-only bus service was proposed to take Emerson Park commuters to Gidea Park as the local bus network did not have sufficient capacity to accommodate them. Another public meeting was held in September ahead of a deadline for objections in October 1963. Further passenger counts were taken in September, because the previous count had taken place during service disruption on the Fenchurch Street line. 430 objections were received. The closure was rejected by the Minister of Transport in September 1965. The halt suffix was removed on 6 May 1968. The station was threatened with closure again after the Transport Act 1968 made changes to the support system for loss-making lines. Reduction to a peak-only service was considered but rejected as it would not save enough money. The notice was published on 13 December 1968 with a closure date of 5 May 1969. This attempt at closure was rejected in December 1972.

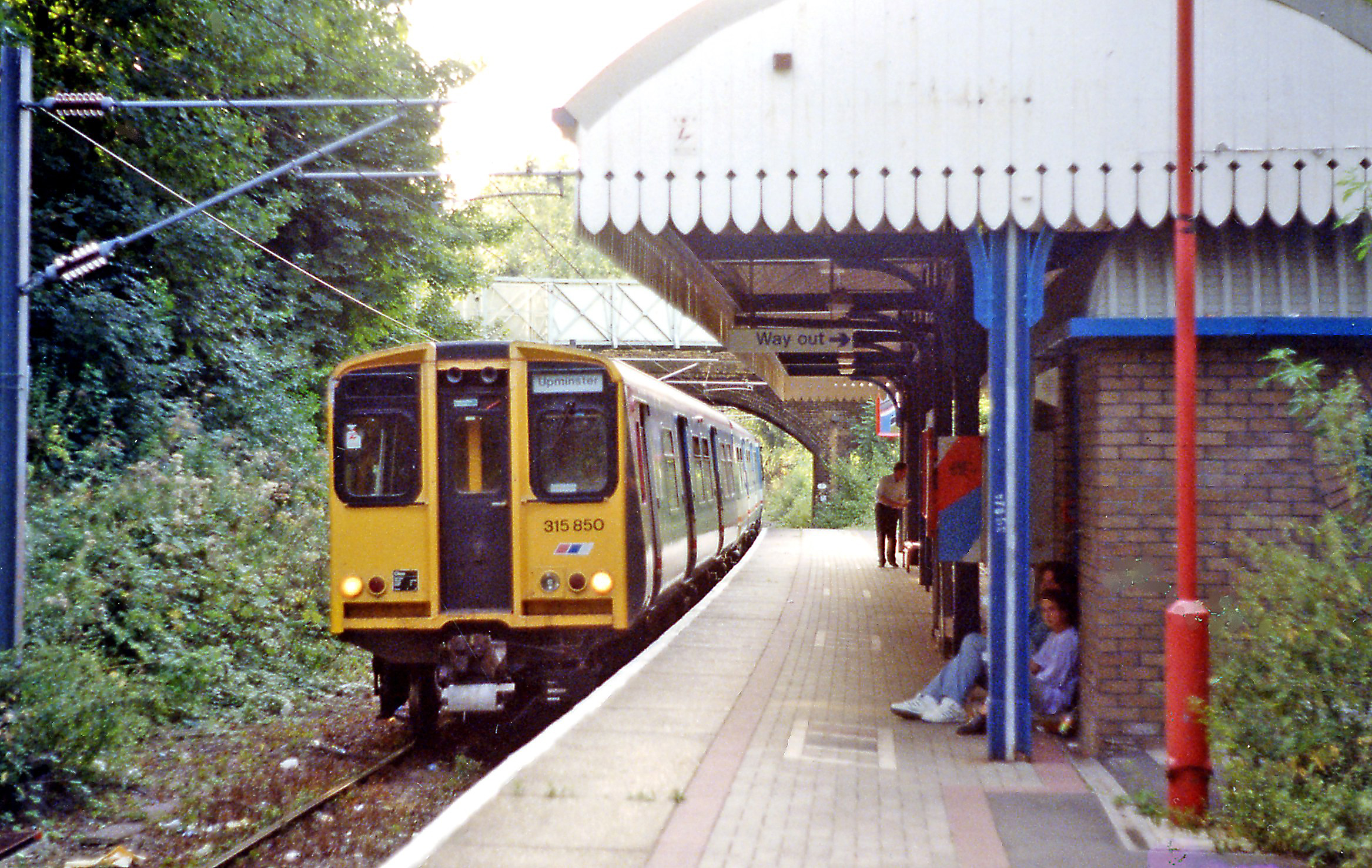
1988 booking office building with a Network SouthEast service to Upminster at the rebuilt platform

Electrification of the line was announced in September 1984. It was done primarily to eliminate the expense of operating an isolated diesel service. Electric multiple unit service began operating on 17 April 1986. The service level remained similar to the diesel timetable introduced in 1956. Following the privatisation of British Rail, the station was managed by First Great Eastern from 1997 to 2004, National Express East Anglia from 2004 to 2012 and Greater Anglia from 2012. The station was transferred to Transport for London (TfL) management on 31 May 2015 and the line become part of the London Overground network. Sunday service was restored from the December 2015 timetable. After incorporation into the London Overground, TfL timetables showed the service as the Romford to Upminster route. In 2015, TfL were considering naming the six London Overground lines and the Emerson line was proposed for the Romford–Upminster service before the idea was abandoned. In July 2023, TfL announced that it would be giving each of the London Overground services unique names by the end of the following year. In February 2024, it was confirmed that the Romford–Upminster service would be named the Liberty line. The new name took effect in November 2024.

== Design ==
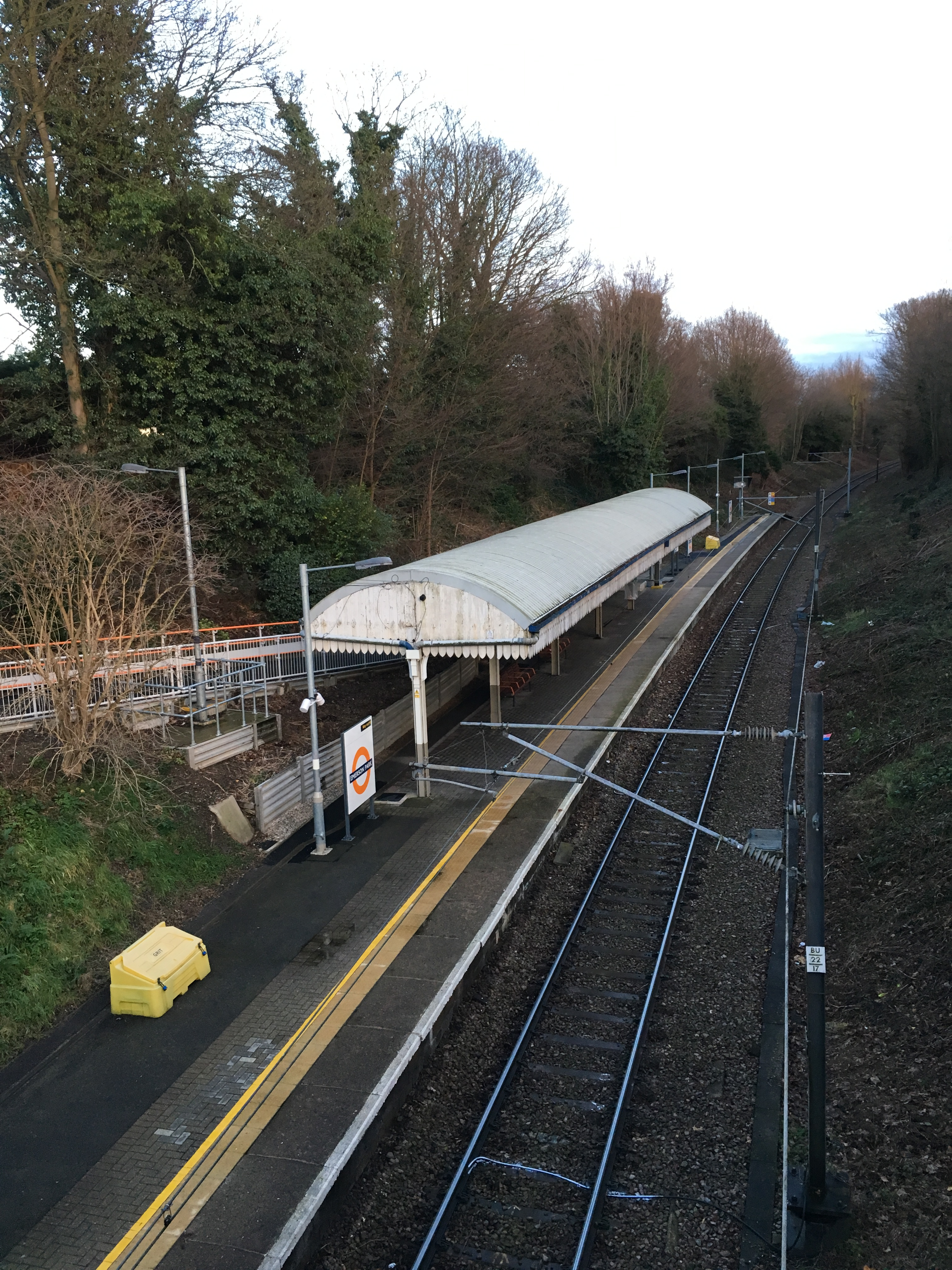
Platform viewed from the bridge

Nothing remains of the original booking office building. It was replaced with a larger building at an unknown date and burned down in 1987. A replacement building opened in 1988. The platform was originally wooden, but was replaced and extended to the east to coincide with electrification. The station consists of an 86 metres (282 ft) side platform located to the north of the single track in a cutting. Access to the street is provided by a ramp. The station is of basic design and has no buildings. There is a 30 metres (98 ft) curved roof canopy with steel columns, that was built in 1909. The Havering Council local register of historic interest describes the building as "Canopy over single platform. Simple iron ‘H’ posts holding up a steel frame, with corrugated sheeting forming a curved roof. Timber valances edging roofline." The curved sawtooth valancing is of a unique design amongst LTSR stations. A run-round loop was constructed 500 yards (457 m) west of the station in 1909 to enable short runs between Emerson Park and Upminster. It ceased to be used in 1934.

== Location ==
The station is the only intermediate station on the Liberty line, located 1 mile 64 chains (2.9 km) from Romford and 1 mile 46 chains (2.5 km) from Upminster. (Note: Railways in the United Kingdom historically are measured in miles and chains. There are 80 chains to one mile.) It is named after the Emerson Park housing estate, located to the northeast. The entrance is situated at the southern end of Butts Green Road at the point it becomes North Street, 0.5 miles (0.80 km) north of Hornchurch town centre. Hornchurch is additionally served by Hornchurch and Upminster Bridge stations, both on the London Underground's District line, with Emerson Park the closest to Hornchurch town centre. London Buses routes 165, 256 and 370 serve the station.

== Services ==
The station is in London fare zone 6. Service from the station is two trains per hour to Upminster and two per hour to Romford. The timetabled journey time to Upminster is five minutes and to Romford is four minutes. Services run Monday to Saturday between approximately 06:15 and 22:00, and on Sundays from approximately 08:45 to 20:00. Emerson Park is one of the least used stations in London and the least used London Overground station. The most popular origin or destination for passengers at the station in 2025/26 was Fenchurch Street. The numbers of passenger entries and exits at the station have been recorded as follows:

- Private operators
- London Overground

== Notes ==
Preceding station	London Overground	Following station
Romford Terminus	Liberty line Romford–Upminster line	Upminster Terminus
