= Upminster station =

London Underground and railway station

Upminster
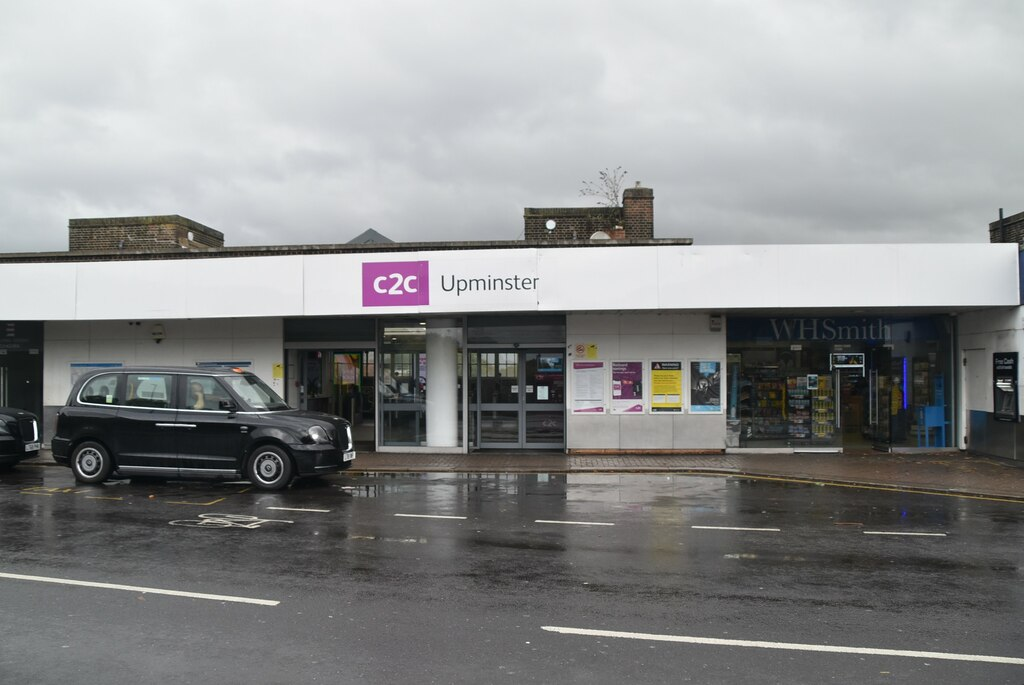
- Station entrance to Hall Lane and Station Road

General information
- Location: Upminster, Havering
- Coordinates: 51.559°N 0.2511°E
- Owner: Network Rail
- Manager: c2c
- Platforms: 7

Construction
- Accessible: Yes (except platform 6)

Other information
- Station code: UPM
- Fare zone: 6
- Classification: Category C2
- Website: Official website

History
- Opened: 1 May 1885
- Original company: London, Tilbury and Southend Railway
- Pre-grouping: Midland Railway
- Post-grouping: London, Midland and Scottish Railway

Key dates
- 2 June 1902: District line started
- 30 September 1905: District line withdrawn
- 12 September 1932: District line restarted
- 1 January 1948: Ownership transferred to British Railways

Passengers

London Underground annual entry and exit
- 2021: ▼2.21 million
- 2022: ▲3.77 million
- 2023: ▲4.77 million
- 2024: ▼4.49 million
- 2025: ▲4.86 million

National Rail annual entry and exit
- 2020–21: ▼1.786 million
- Interchange: ▼0.343 million
- 2021–22: ▲3.711 million
- Interchange: ▲0.690 million
- 2022–23: ▲4.406 million
- Interchange: ▲0.765 million
- 2023–24: ▲4.613 million
- Interchange: ▲0.952 million
- 2024–25: ▲5.021 million
- Interchange: ▼0.811 million
Location
- Location in Havering

Upminster is a major interchange station in the town of Upminster in the London Borough of Havering, East London. It is on the London, Tilbury and Southend line, 15 miles 20 chains (24.5 km) down the line from Fenchurch Street in Central London. It is the eastern terminus of the District line on the London Underground and the eastern terminus of the Liberty line on the London Overground. The station was originally opened on 1 May 1885 by the London, Tilbury and Southend Railway on a new direct route from London to Southend that avoided Tilbury. It became a junction station in 1892 when a new branch line was opened to Romford. The station was expanded in 1932 by the London, Midland and Scottish Railway with a new entrance and additional platforms constructed to serve the electric Metropolitan District Railway local service which was extended from Barking. The station was expanded again in 1957 and 1958, with a seventh platform added and the main station building given a new facade. The station is managed by c2c and is in London fare zone 6.

== History ==
The original 1854 route of the London, Tilbury and Southend Railway (LTSR) avoided Upminster, passing much closer to the River Thames. The nearest station was at Rainham. Between 1885 and 1888 a new route authorised as the Barking and Pitsea Railway was constructed. It provided a direct service from Fenchurch Street to Southend, avoiding Tilbury. A sod-cutting ceremony took place near Upminster Windmill on 11 October 1883. The George Hopkins designed station at Upminster opened as the temporary eastern terminus of the first section of the new line on 1 May 1885. It was opened to East Horndon on 1 May 1886 and through service to Southend commenced on 1 June 1888.

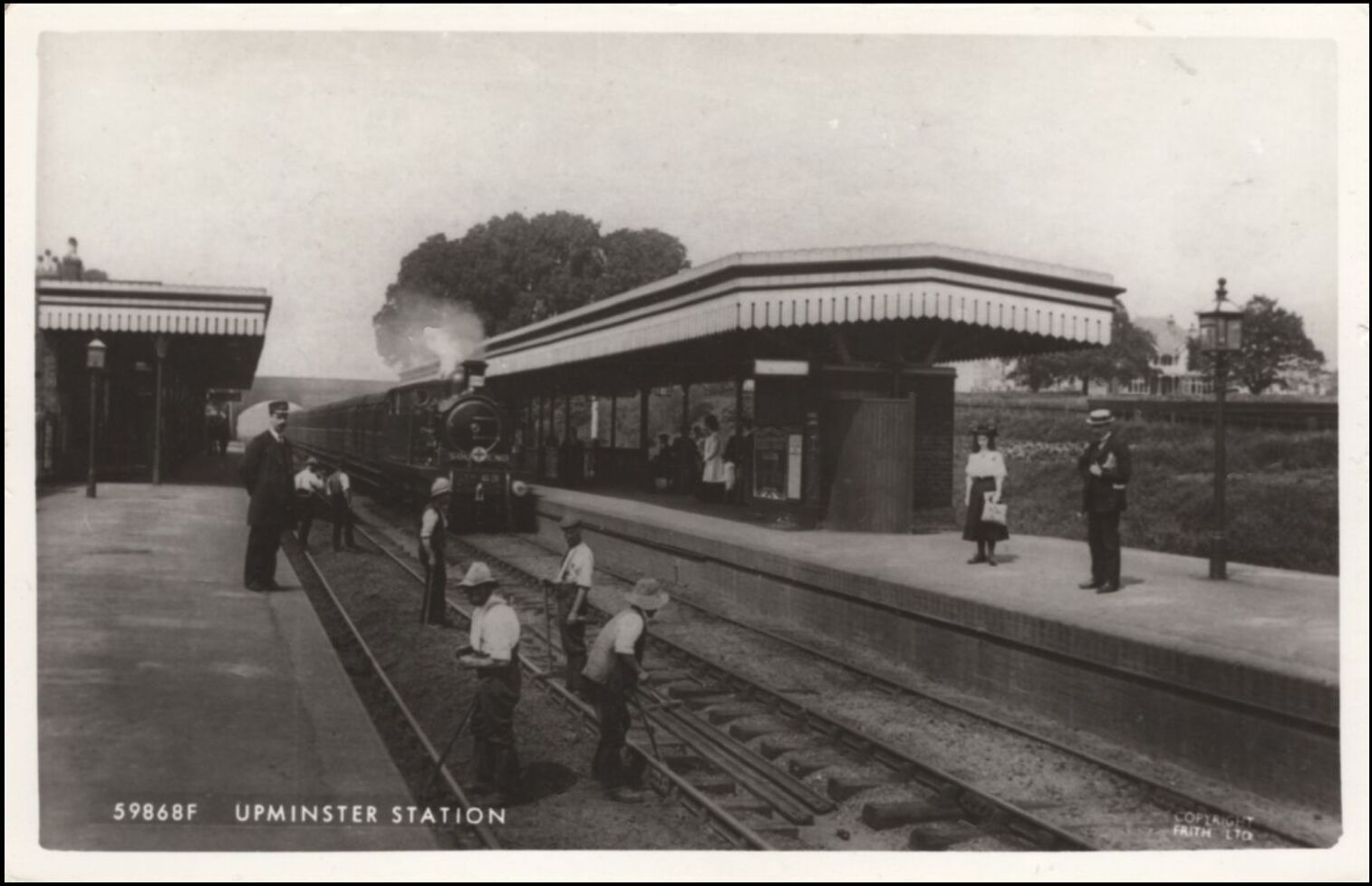
Through London–Southend platforms 1 and 2 in 1908

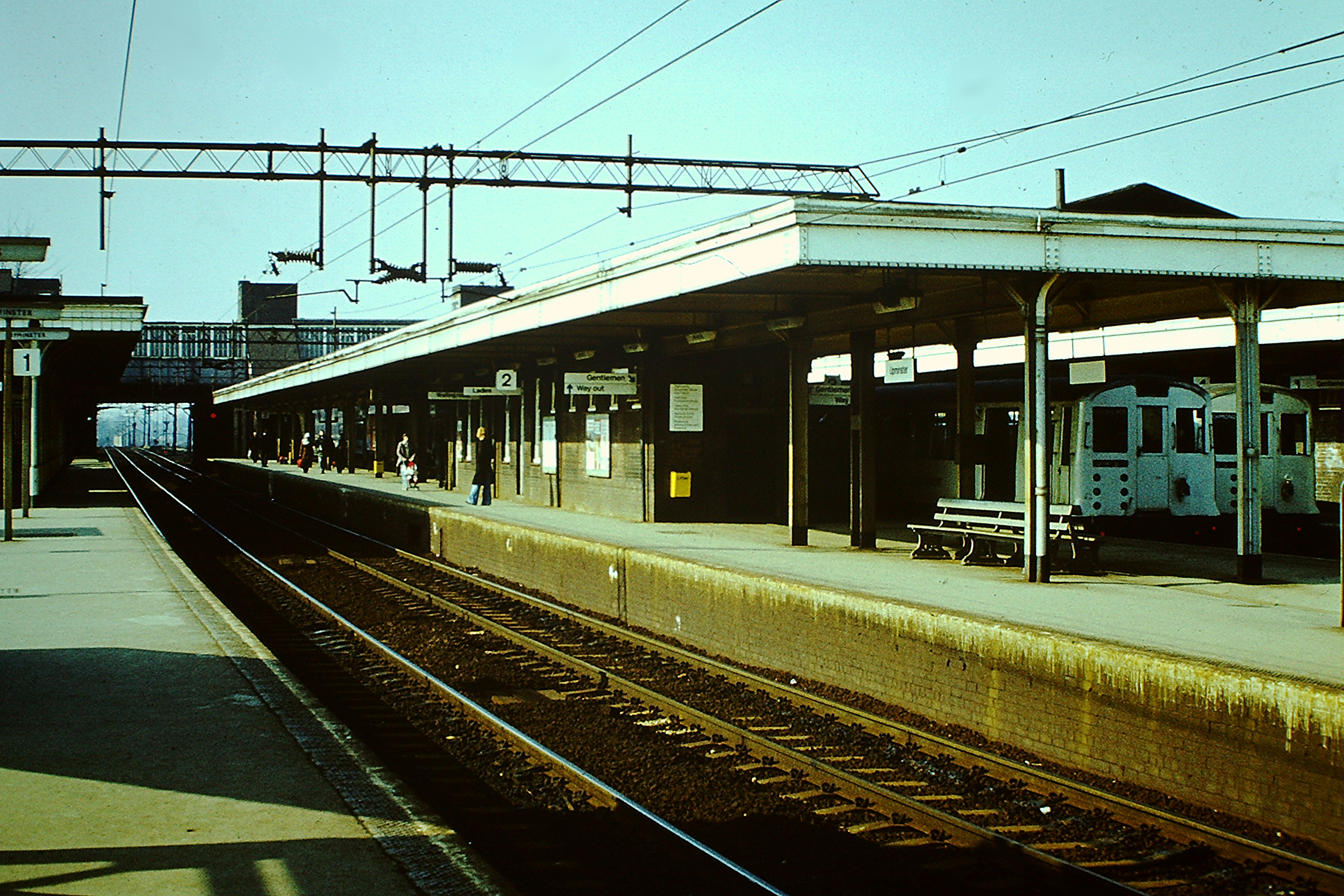
Buildings on platforms 2 and 3 from the 1932 rebuild in 1976

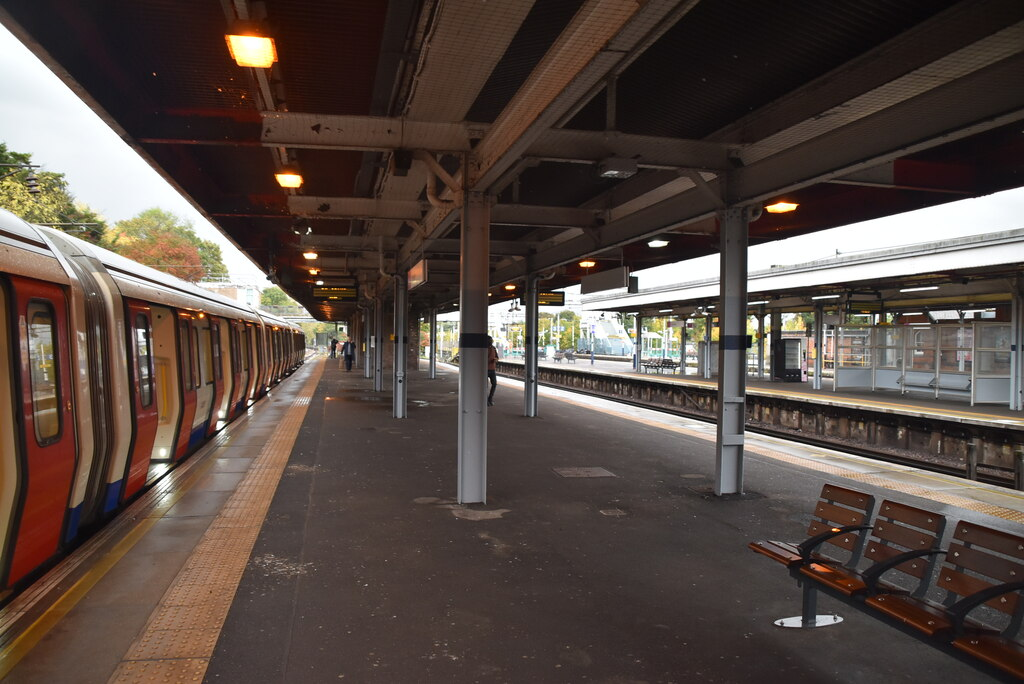
Platforms 4 and 5 were added in 1932

The LTSR gained powers to build a branch line from Romford to Grays via Upminster in 1883. The Upminster–Grays section was opened on 1 July 1892 and the Romford–Upminster section opened on 7 June 1893. The Whitechapel and Bow Railway opened on 2 June 1902 and allowed through services of the District Railway to operate to Upminster. The District converted to electric trains on 30 September 1905 and services were cut back to East Ham. (Note: Electric service was extended to Barking on 1 April 1908.) Upminster was served by regular daily District/LTSR through trains from June 1912 to September 1932, changing from electric District to steam LTSR locomotives at Barking.

Delayed by World War I, electrified tracks were extended by the London, Midland and Scottish Railway (LMS) to Upminster and through services resumed in 1932. The expanded station was built to the designs of LMS architect William Henry Hamlyn, drawing inspiration from London Underground station architecture. Electric train service was initially a train every 10 minutes at peak times and every 20 minutes off-peak.

The District Railway was incorporated into London Transport in 1933, and became known as the District line. After nationalisation of the railways in 1948, management of Upminster station passed to British Railways. The main station building was enlarged in 1958. In order to completely separate District line services from British Railways, the Romford–Grays line was split into two distinct branches terminating at Upminster. To facilitate this, platform 6 was opened on 20 May 1957 next to an existing track that was previously used as a siding.

The London, Tilbury and Southend line was run by a private operator from 26 May 1996, initially known as LTS Rail. The secondary entrance was refurbished in 2018 and the main entrance in 2019. Part of the eastern footbridge was refurbished in 2023. The London Overground service at the station was rebranded as the Liberty line from November 2024. Private operation of the London, Tilbury and Southend line by Trenitalia c2c ceased on 20 July 2025, with the new publicly owned operator c2c taking over.

== Design ==
The station consists of seven platforms on an east–west alignment. Platform 1A, the southernmost, is a short east-facing bay that can only be accessed by trains from the Grays branch. Platform 1, served by the up line to Fenchurch Street, is directly to the north. Platform 2, served by the down line to Southend, shares an island with platform 3, one of three with access to Upminster Depot for the London Underground service. Platforms 4 and 5, also for the London Underground, form an island to the north. Platform 6, the northernmost, is a side platform for London Overground service.

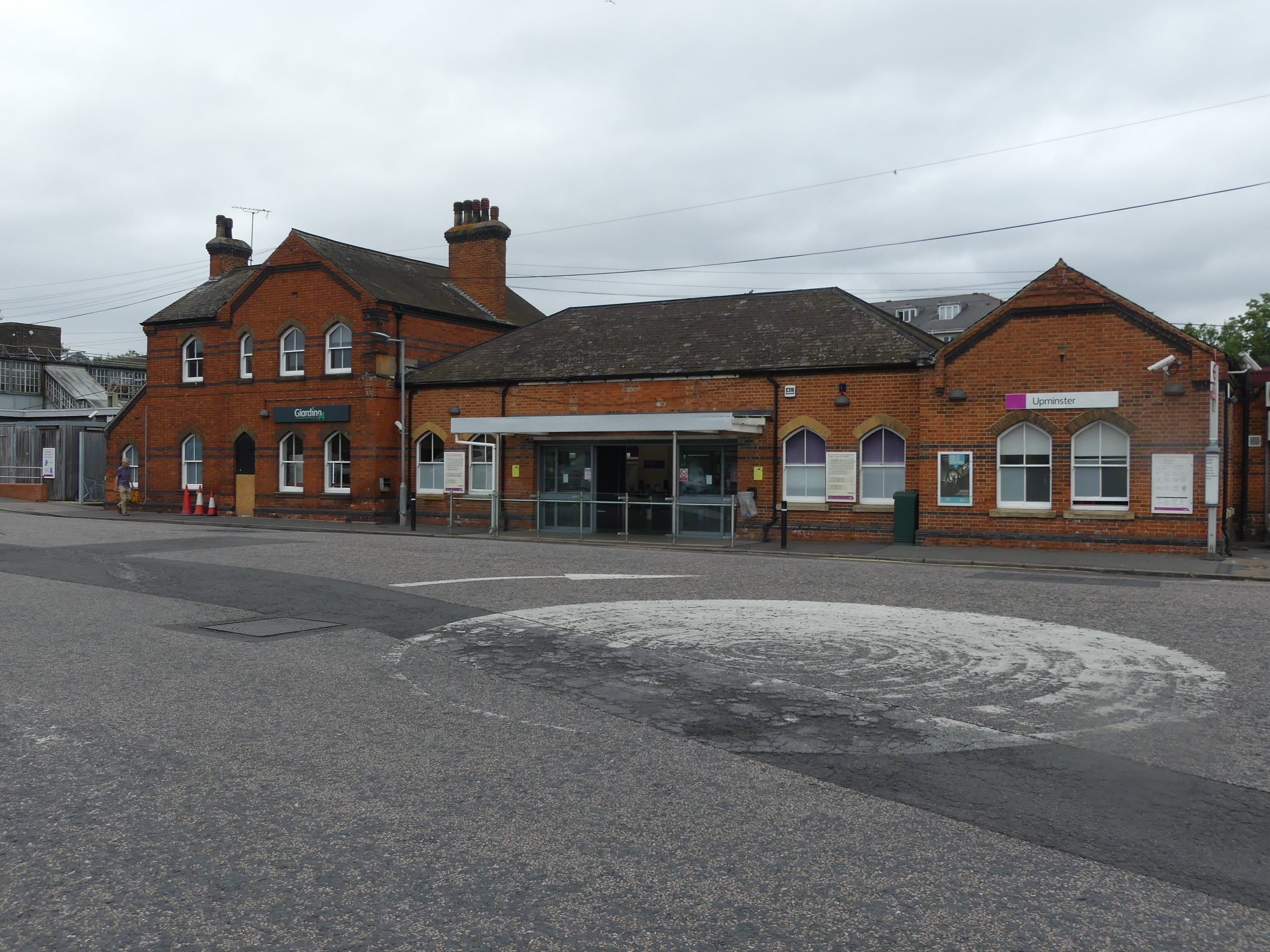
The 1885 station building in 2024

The main station entrance to Station Road and Hall Lane is located on a bridge over the railway lines. A unified facade with the 1958 building extension to the north hides features of the interwar architecture here. The station buildings on platform 1, with secondary entrance to Station Approach, are the remaining Victorian architecture from the opening of the station by the LTSR in 1885. The station building design was originally intended for Hornchurch but a change of plans saw it employed at Upminster. The three interconnected red brick buildings, each with their own timber gable roofs, are substantially as constructed but now with a modernised entrance and interiors. Blue/black brick forms a decorative stripe and the pointed arch windows are surrounded by yellow brick. The original exterior station canopy has been removed. There is a still in situ, but abandoned since 1932, subway connection between platforms 1/1A and 2/3 that is an original feature of the station. There is a public toilet in the platform 1 station building.

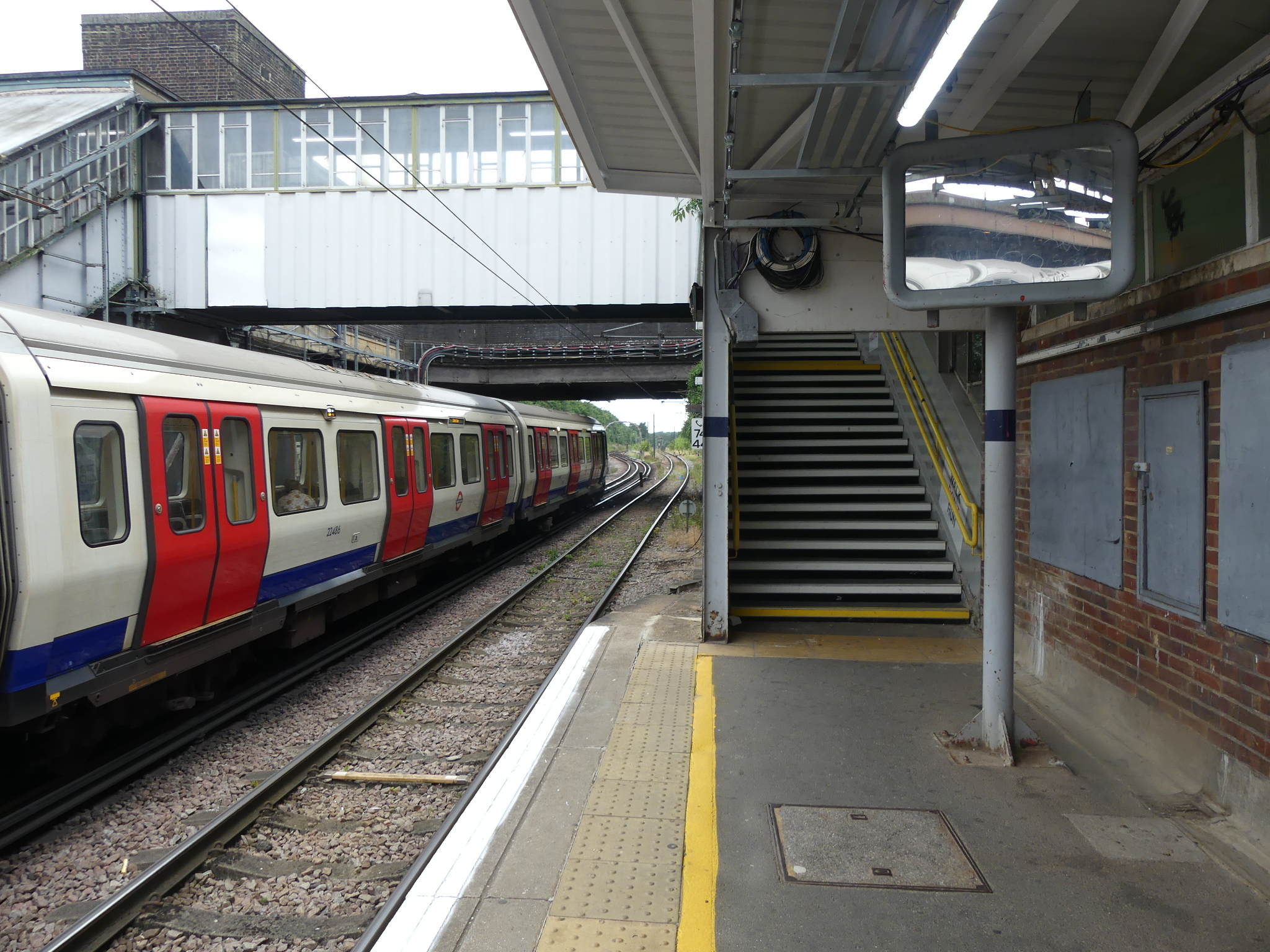
Platform 6 and the footbridge extension were added in 1957

The western covered footbridge, buildings and canopies on platforms 2/3 and 4/5 date from the 1932 LMS expansion for District Railway electric service and are similar to the Art Deco island platform buildings at Upney and Dagenham Heathway. The second, uncovered, eastern footbridge dates from 1935. It was added to improve circulation for interchange passengers. Platform 6 and the covered footbridge connection are of Eastern Region of British Railways architecture contemporary with the late 1950s. Platform 6 does not connect to the eastern footbridge and does not have step-free access. All other platforms have step-free access to the street.

== Location ==
The station is situated within the suburban town of Upminster. It has entrances to Station Lane/Hall Lane and Station Approach in the London Borough of Havering. To the south of the station is a shopping area surrounded by extensive residential development. Upminster is the easternmost station on the London Underground network as well as the easternmost National Rail station in London. On the London, Tilbury and Southend line it is 15 miles 20 chains (24.5 km) down the line from Fenchurch Street. The station is served by London Buses routes 248, 346, 370, 646 and 652.

== Services ==
Upminster station is managed by c2c. It is in London fare zone 6. The typical off-peak c2c service from the station is 6 trains per hour to Fenchurch Street, 4 to Shoeburyness via Basildon (Note: 2 trains per hour all stations and 2 semi-fast.) and 2 to Southend Central via Ockendon. The typical off-peak District line service from the station is 12 trains per hour to Earl's Court, of which six continue to Ealing Broadway and six continue to Richmond. The typical off-peak Liberty line service is two trains per hour to Romford. With 4.86 million entries and exits in 2025, it was ranked the 125th busiest London Underground station.

== Notes ==
Preceding station	London Underground	Following station
Upminster Bridge towards Wimbledon, Richmond or Ealing Broadway	District line	Terminus
Preceding station	London Overground	Following station
Emerson Park towards Romford	Liberty line Romford–Upminster line	Terminus
Preceding station	National Rail	Following station
Barking	c2c London, Tilbury and Southend line	West Horndon
Barking	c2c London, Tilbury and Southend line	Ockendon
