= River Ingrebourne =

Tributary of the River Thames in England

Coordinates: 51.56901°N 0.24857°E

Ingrebourne Rainham Creek
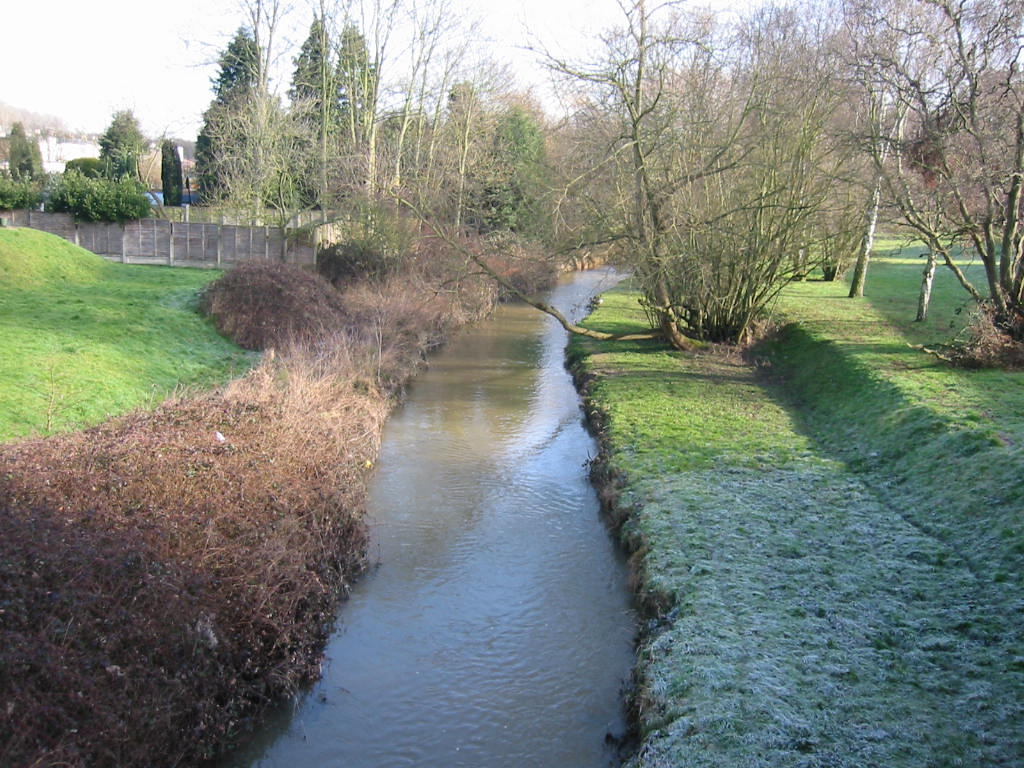
- Looking north from the bridge on Berkeley Drive

Location
- Country: England
- Counties: Greater London
- London boroughs: Havering
- Towns: Upminster, Hornchurch, Rainham

Physical characteristics
- Source
  - location: Brentwood, Essex
- Mouth: River Thames
  - location: Rainham Marsh, Rainham
- Length: 43.3 km (26.9 mi)
- Discharge
  - location: Gaynes Park
  - average: 0.33 m^{3}/s (12 cu ft/s)
  - minimum: 0.06 m^{3}/s (2.1 cu ft/s)17 August 1972
  - maximum: 29.0 m^{3}/s (1,020 cu ft/s)21 November 1974

Basin features
- Tributaries
  - left: Weald Brook, Carters Brook, Paynes Brook

The River Ingrebourne /ˈɪŋɡərˌbɔːrn/ is a tributary of the River Thames 27 miles (43.3 km) in length. It is considered a strategic waterway in London, forming part of the Blue Ribbon Network. It flows through the London Borough of Havering roughly from north to south, joining the Thames at Rainham.

== Etymology ==
The name is recorded in 1062 as Ingceburne and its suffix is a form of the Old English 'burna', meaning bourne, a type of stream. The meaning of the prefix is unclear, although it could refer to a person.

== Description ==
The Ingrebourne rises near Brentwood, Essex, whence it flows in a southwesterly direction under the M25 motorway through the London Borough of Havering in north east London. The river passes under the motorway near Junction 28, where the first of its tributaries, the 2.7 miles (4.3 km) long Weald Brook joins, followed shortly by Carters Brook and Paynes Brook. After skirting south of the built-up area of Harold Hill, the route passes under the Great Eastern Main Line. From here it is partly non-urban: a large area of flood-plain follows before the Ingrebourne threads between the suburbs of Upminster and Hornchurch.

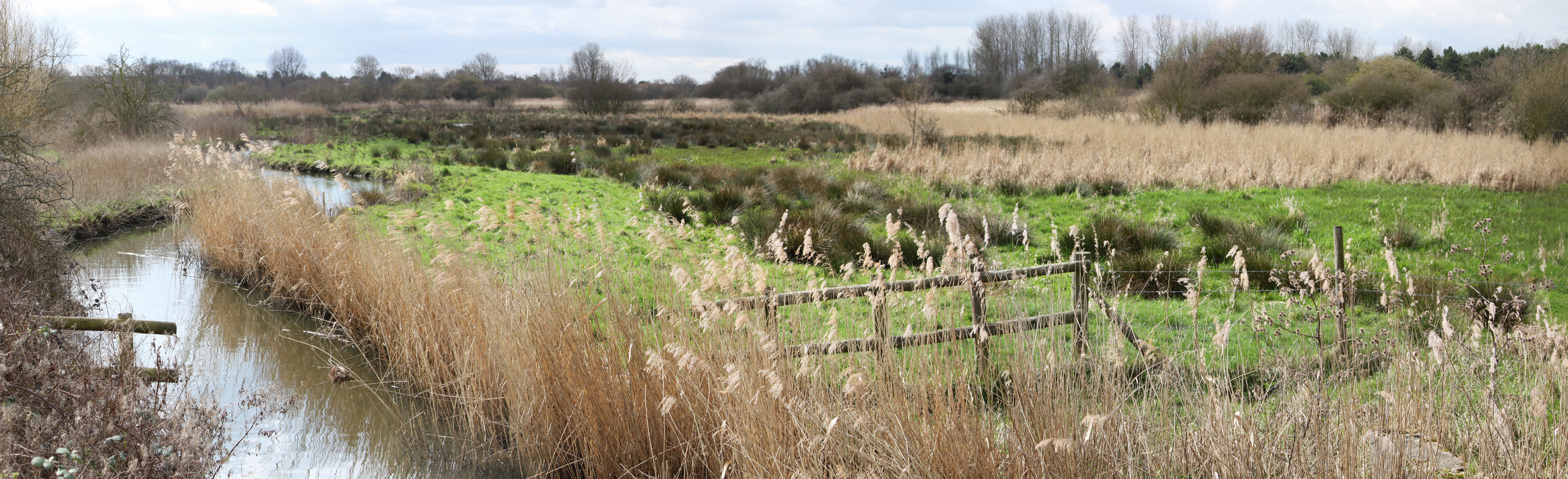
Ingrebourne Valley from Hornchurch Country Park

The river from here is surrounded by public open space: with Gaynes Parkway, the Ingrebourne Valley Greenway and Hornchurch Country Park taking up the area until reaching Rainham. Here the river divides, the main channel becoming Rainham Creek, where it flows into the Thames between Hornchurch Marshes (to the west) and Rainham Marshes (to the east) at Old Man's Head. The second channel becomes the Wennington Sewers complex.

== Significance ==
The Ingrebourne Marshes are a Site of Special Scientific Interest because of the diversity of its wildlife and extensive areas of wetland reeds. The river forms one of the strategic waterways identified in the Blue Ribbon Network policy in the London Plan. The Ingrebourne Valley is a Local Nature Reserve.

== Crossings ==
Crossing	Type	Coordinates	Opened	Notes	Photo
Putwell Bridge	Road bridge		1582	Carries the A12 road	
Harold Park Bridge	Road bridge				
River Ingrebourne Underline Bridge	Railway bridge, brick bridge			Carries the Great Eastern Main Line	
Cockabourne Bridge	Road bridge		1613		
Footbridge	Footbridge				
Rainbow Bridge	Footbridge		2002		
Badger Bridge	Footbridge		2002		
Upminster Bridge	Road bridge		1375		
Hacton Bridge	Road bridge		1299		
Footbridge	Footbridge				
Footbridge	Footbridge, bicycle bridge				
Red Bridge	Road bridge		1234	Also known as Rainham Bridge	
Rainham Viaduct	Girder bridge, high-speed railway viaduct		2007		
Rainham Creek Culvert	Buried watercourse		1976	Discharges into the River Thames at a sluice	

== See also ==
- Tributaries of the River Thames
- List of rivers in England

Next confluence upstream	River Thames	Next confluence downstream
River Beam (north)	River Ingrebourne	Mardyke (north)
