= Brenda Crowe =

Brenda Crowe may refer to:

- Brenda Crowe (gymnast) (1913–2004), British gymnast
- Brenda Crowe (child educator) (1920–?), English nursery teacher and author
