= 2022 Wennington wildfire =

2022 fire in London, England

Wennington wildfire
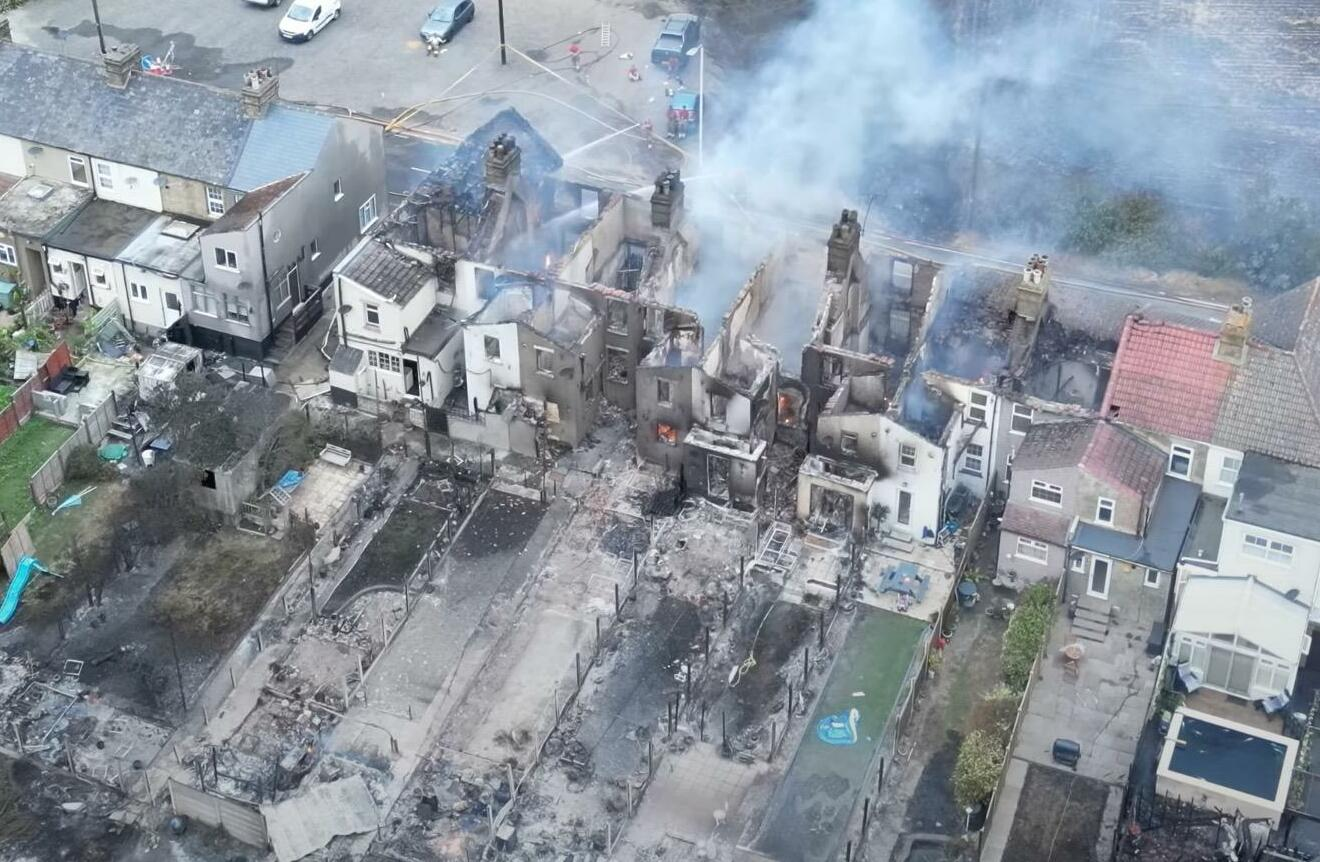
- Destroyed houses burning on the day of the fire
- Date: 19 July 2022; 13:00 – 21:47 (GMT)
- Location: Wennington, London, England
- Coordinates: 51.5061°N 0.2189°E

Statistics
- Burned area: 20 ha (49 acres)

Impacts
- Deaths: 0
- Evacuated: 90 families
- Structures destroyed: 18–19 homes

Map
- Location of the fire in Greater London

On 19 July 2022, a wildfire started in Wennington, East London, during the 2022 United Kingdom heatwave. No-one was killed, but the wildfire destroyed about 18–19 houses, including all the possessions of many residents. One resident said her house burned down "within two minutes".

The wildfire began when a compost heap spontaneously combusted. It took place on the hottest day since British records began, and has been described as an indication of the threat posed by global warming in the UK, a country in which wildfires have historically been rare and mostly seen on isolated grassland and moorland areas rather than in urban areas.

== Background ==
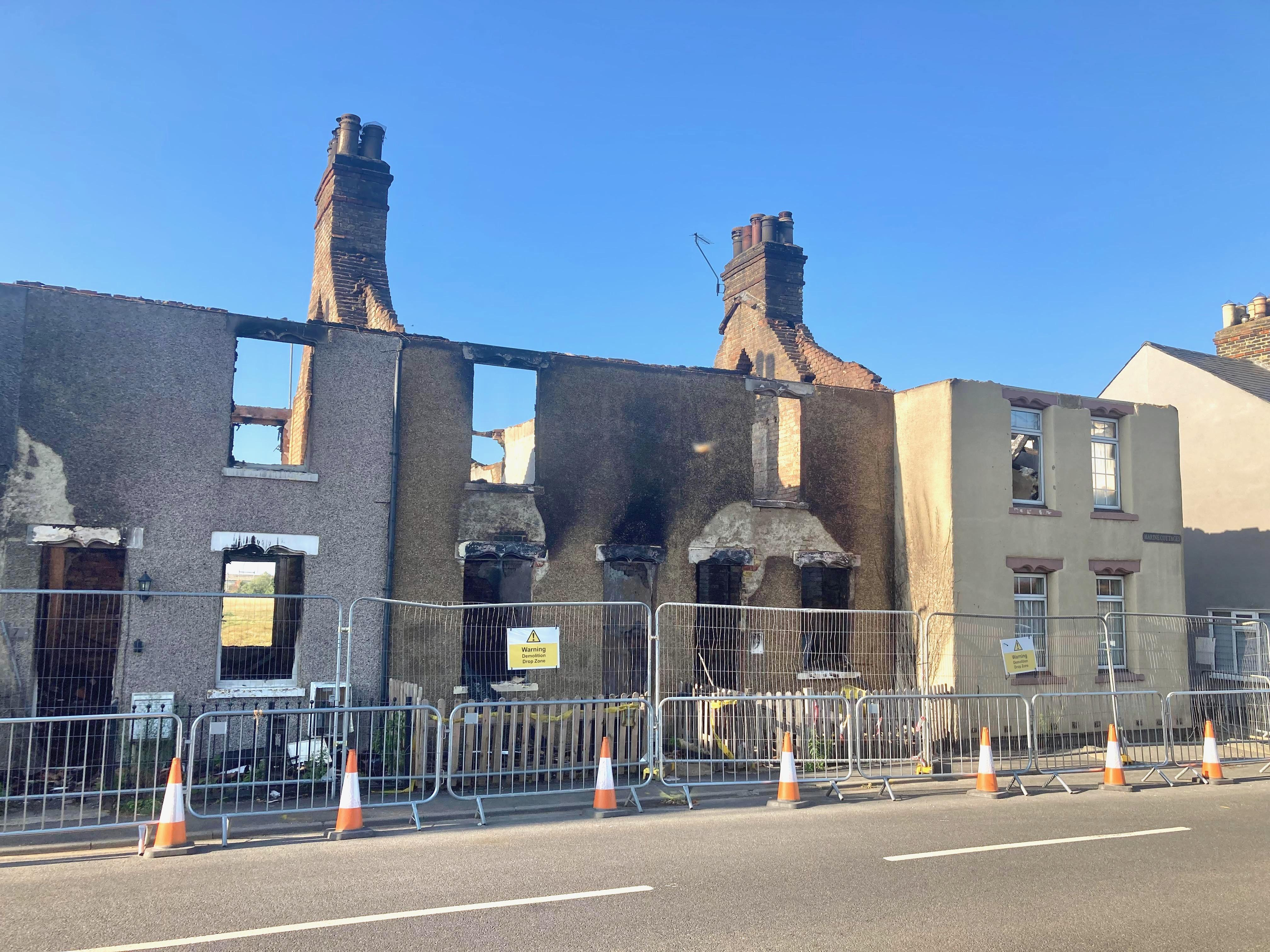
Burned-out houses viewed a few weeks after the fire.

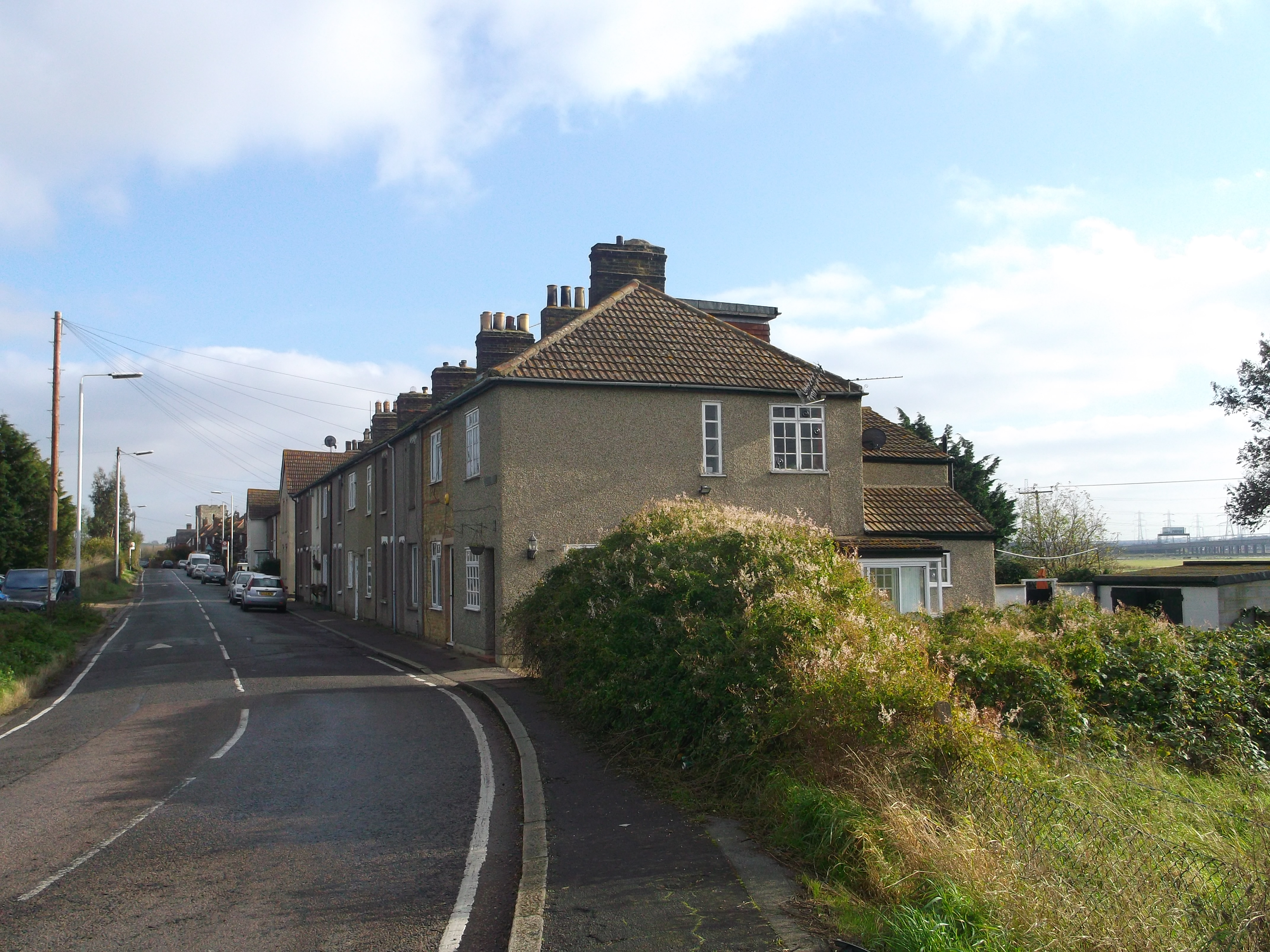
Wennington Road looking east in 2012. The centre of the parade of houses viewed in the image burned down in the fire.

Wennington is a village in the east of London, on the edge of the built up area. The area is surrounded by grassland.

Wildfires are a known risk in the UK, however, they are most associated with isolated moorland and heathland areas, rather than built-up areas.

The fire occurred during the 2022 United Kingdom heat waves, and 19 July was predicted by forecasters in advance to be extremely hot. Advance predictions were made that the UK's all-time temperature record could be broken, which it was, with the highest temperature recorded in the country 40.3 °C (104.5 °F) in Coningsby, Lincolnshire, breaking the previous record set in 2019 by 1.6 °C (2.9 °F). A long period of little rain before 19 July had also left vegetation very dry.

Although one of the most destructive fires of 19 July, many other fires were reported on the same day. The Mayor of London reported that the number of fire brigade emergency calls was seven times the normal.

== Events ==
By 10 a.m., London temperatures had gone over 35 °C (95 °F). The fire reportedly started around 1 p.m. from a compost heap in the southeast of the village which spontaneously combusted, with flames spreading along a garden fence. Although a fire station is located in the east of the village, the crews had been called out to other fires. The fire brigade was called at 13:06, and a fire engine arrived seven minutes later, by which time the fire had expanded. One firefighter told LBC News that "it felt apocalyptic, just crazy, we were chasing it and we had no chance of stopping it".

Residents took shelter in the nearby St Mary and St Peter's Church. The church filled with smoke while they were sheltering and the fire burned through the graveyard around the building, but the church itself was not damaged.

Parish churchwarden Tim Stock said that his family had "lost everything" but had managed to evacuate his family and pets. Claire Taylor said that her house burned down "within two minutes" and that she lost almost all her family's possessions. One resident said that grass fires in the area were quite common "but it's nothing like this...this is like the apocalypse." Stock commented that "it was like a warzone...all the windows had exploded out, all the rooves had caved, it was like a scene from the Blitz".

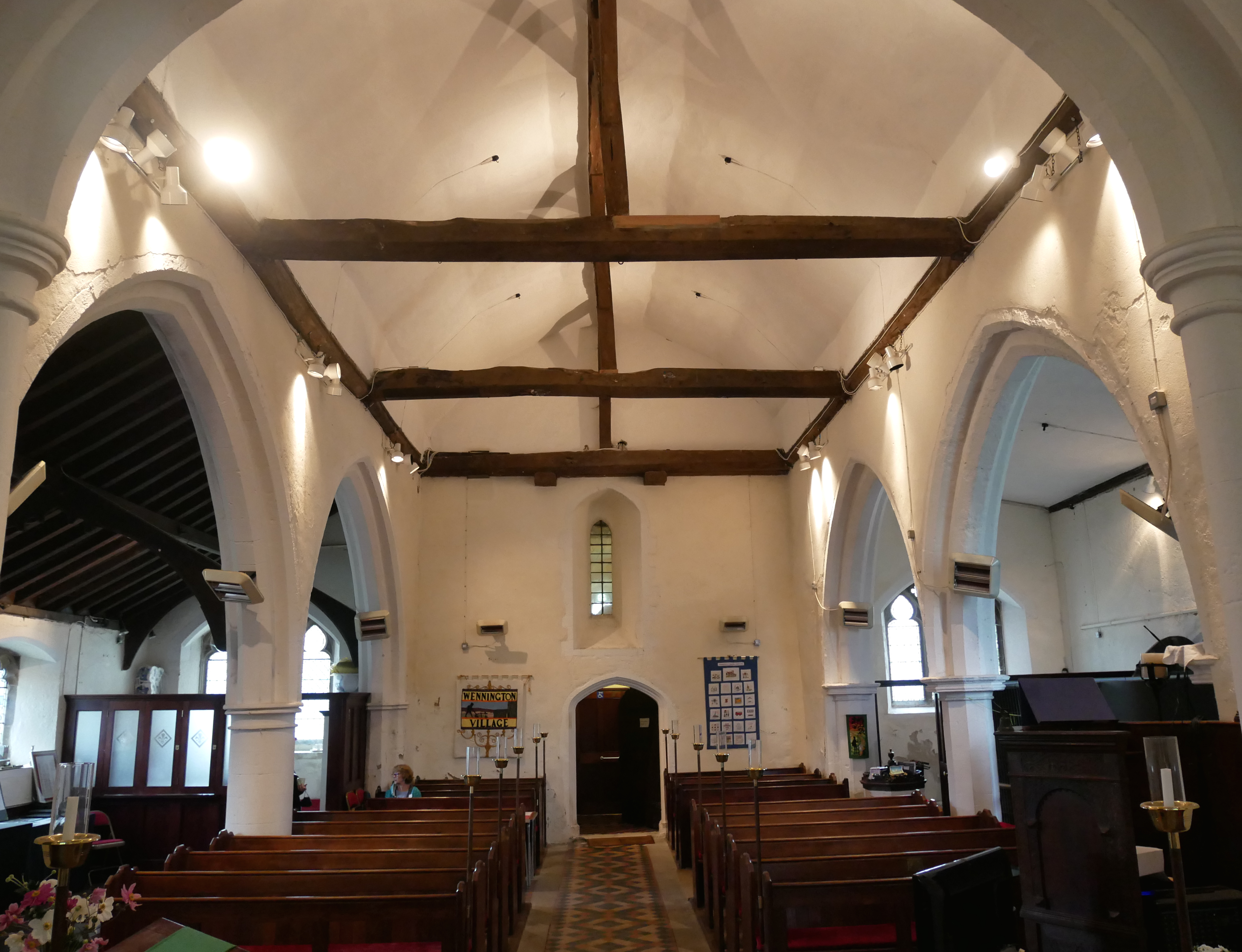
The interior of St Mary and St Peter's Church, where residents sheltered from the fire (pictured in 2021)

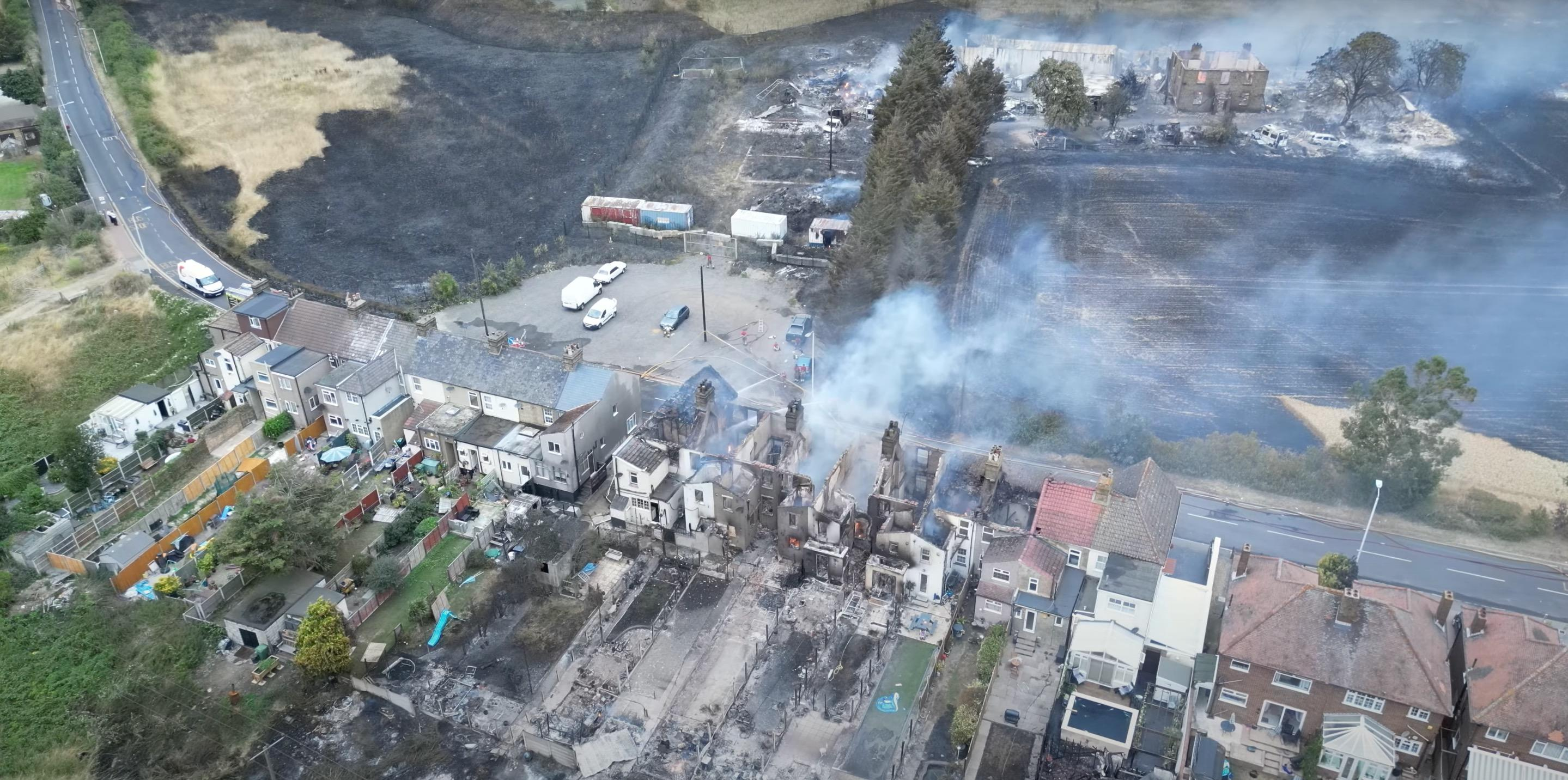
View looking north

== Aftermath ==
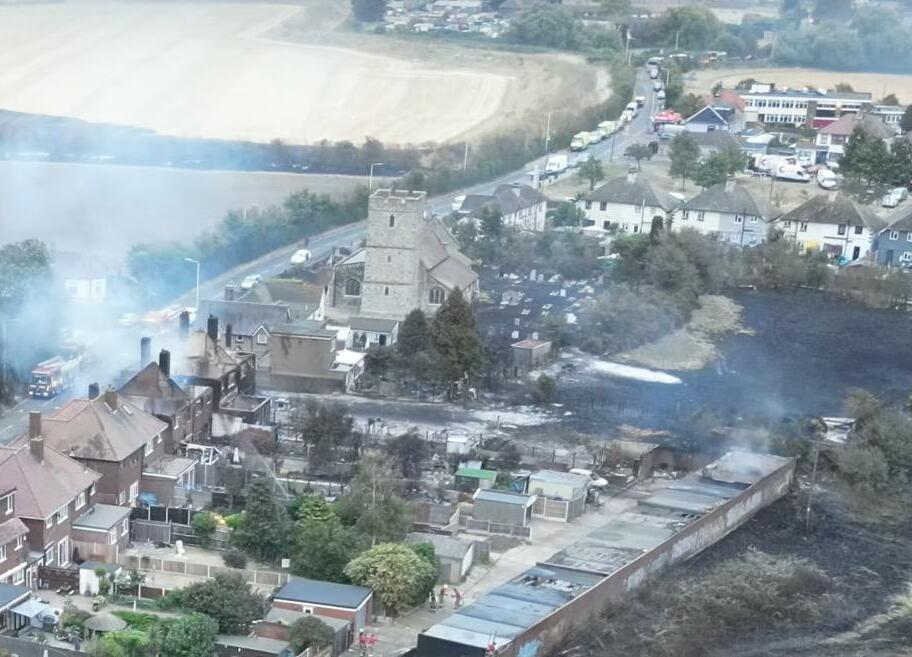
Aerial view looking east, showing the fire around the church area. Wennington Fire Station is at top right.

Andy Roe, head of the London Fire Brigade, described the events as "unprecedented": "I saw stuff this week that I had not expected to see as a London firefighter."

Experts commented that climate change was increasing fire risk. Guillermo Rein, Professor of Fire Sciences at Imperial College London, said that "the UK will start to see fires which are much larger". Dr Rory Hadden, Senior Lecturer in Fire Investigation at the University of Edinburgh, commented that "as the climate changes, the UK will be susceptible to these kinds of fires which can be extremely devastating...we should expect more and larger wildfires". Nigel Arnell, professor of climate system science at the University of Reading, commented that "while we might not see the sorts of forest fires sweeping through Spain, Portugal and France, we are increasingly prone to fires in grassland and moorland that have the potential to affect people, property and infrastructure as well as the environment...climate change is increasing fire danger across the UK, and we need to be prepared for it." Graham Beers, Station Commander of Wennington Fire Station, who had been attending another fire when the fire started, commented "These sorts of fires are not going to be the last...That's just due to climate change. Twenty years in the fire service and I've never really seen devastation like it." Paul Davies, chief meteorologist at the Met Office, commented that the heatwave would have been "impossible in the pre-industrial era". LFB Assistant Commissioner Jonathan Smith commented "we are increasingly being challenged by new extremes of weather as our climate changes and we're developing long-term strategies to deal with more incidents like this in the future."

Another grass fire began burning in the area three days later, and another in August.

Three Conservative Party councillors elected to Havering Council for the Rainham & Wennington ward subsequently switched to Havering Residents Association as they felt unsupported following the wildfire.

== See also ==
- 2022 European and Mediterranean wildfires
