= Wennington, London =

Coordinates: 51.5061°N 0.2189°E

Wennington
- Village
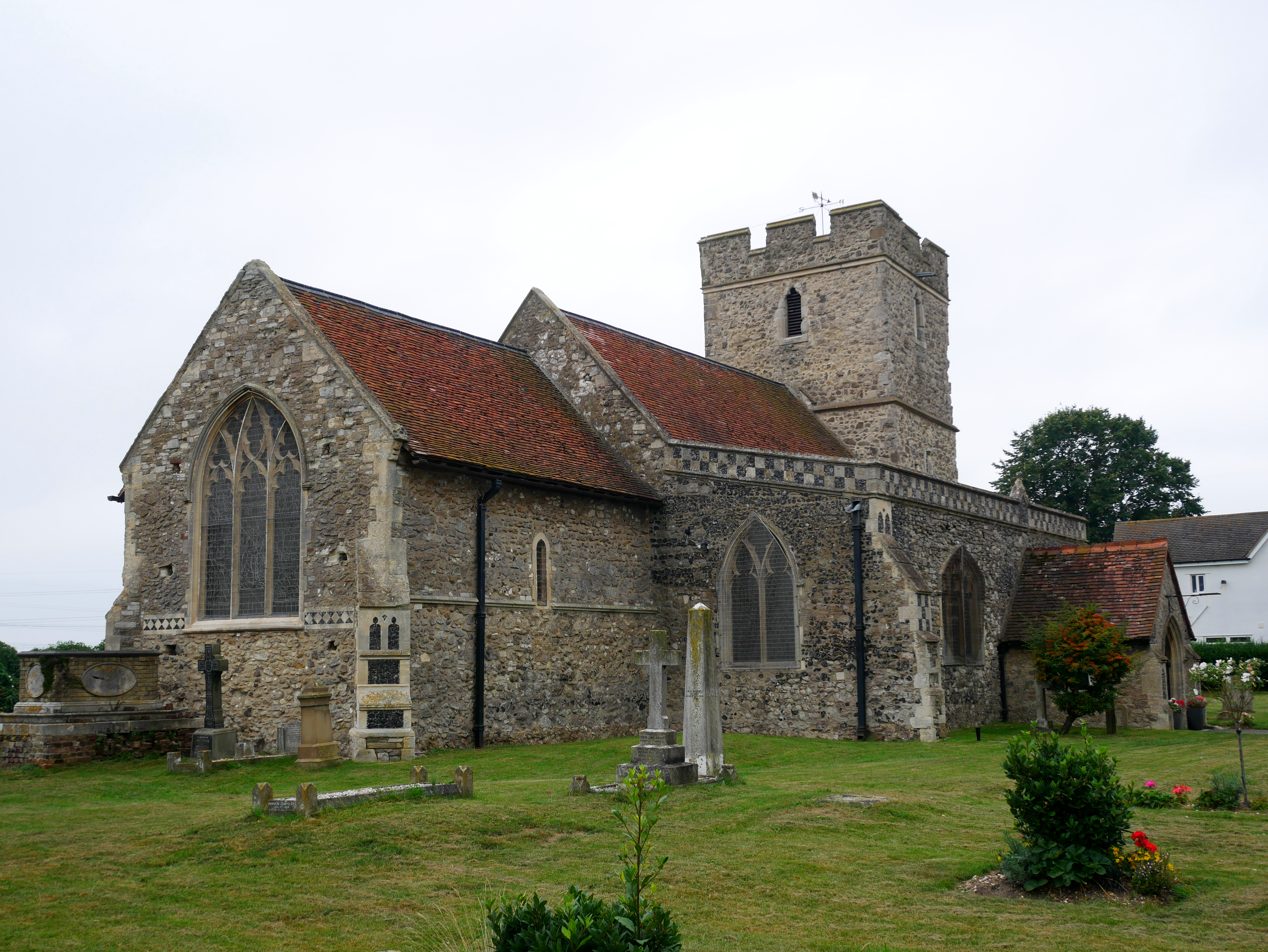
- Church of St Mary and St Peter

- Location within Greater London
- Population: 300 (approximate)
- OS grid reference: TQ540809
  - Charing Cross: 14.8 mi (23.8 km) E
- London borough: Havering
- Ceremonial county: Greater London
- Region: London
- Country: England
- Sovereign state: United Kingdom
- Post town: RAINHAM
- Postcode district: RM13
- Dialling code: 01708
- Police: Metropolitan
- Fire: London
- Ambulance: London
- UK Parliament: Dagenham and Rainham
- London Assembly: Havering and Redbridge

Wennington is a small village in the London Borough of Havering, in east London. It is situated 14.8 miles (23.8 km) east of Charing Cross. Wennington was an ancient parish in the county of Essex that was superseded for civil purposes in 1934. It is peripheral to London, forming a ribbon development extending from the eastern edge of the urban sprawl and surrounded by the Metropolitan Green Belt. Wennington was added to Hornchurch Urban District in 1934 and has formed part of Greater London since 1965.

== History ==
Wennington (parish) population
1881	196
1891	310
1901	360
1911	364
1921	432
1931	359
1941	war #
1951	320
# no census was held due to war
source: UK census

Wennington is recorded in the Domesday Book of 1086 as Wemtuna. The manor had only three households and was in the possession of Westminster Abbey. The Church of England parish church, St Mary and St Peter's, dates from the 12th century.

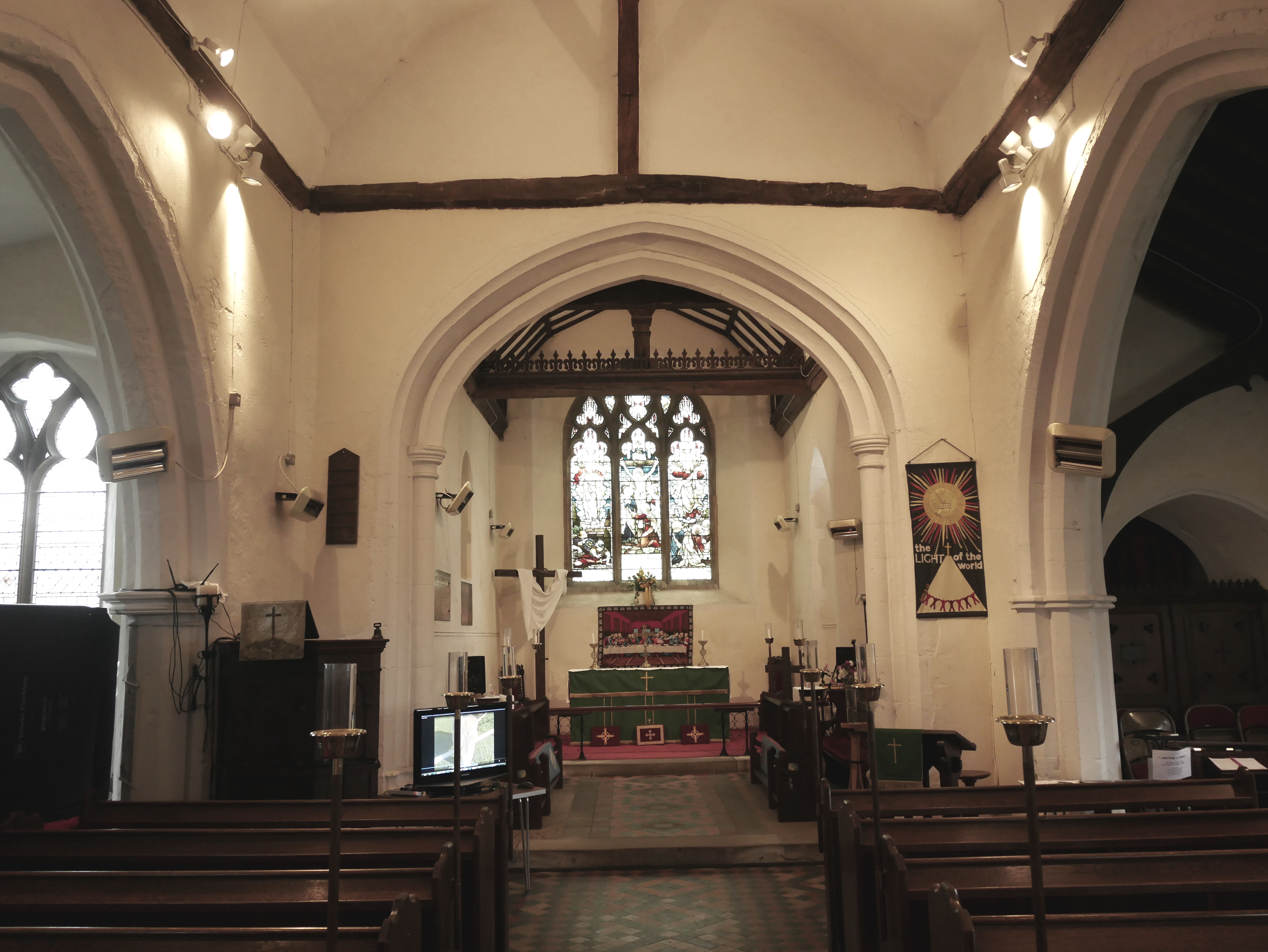
Interior of the Church of Saint Mary and Saint Peter, Wennington

The parish included the Thameside area of Coldharbour, the Wennington Marshes and the village of Wennington. The Wennington parish became part of the Romford Poor Law Union in 1836. It was the smallest parish in the union with a population of 127. In 1875 the parish became part of the Romford rural sanitary district. In 1894 the Romford Rural District was created and Wennington gained a parish council.

Following a county review order in 1934, and in anticipation of suburban house building, Wennington became part of an expanded Hornchurch Urban District and the parish council was abolished. On 1 April 1965 the parish and Hornchurch Urban District were abolished, and Wennington became part of the London Borough of Havering in Greater London. At the 1951 census (one of the last before the abolition of the parish), Wennington had a population of 320.

On 19 July 2022, Wennington was hit by a wildfire during the 2022 United Kingdom heat wave. At least 18 houses were burnt down and many others damaged, while around 90 families were evacuated from the village with a rescue centre set up in a nearby hotel. Around 15 fire engines and 100 firefighters were sent to the scene by London Fire Brigade. The fire reportedly started from a compost heap which spontaneously combusted, with flames subsequently spreading along a garden fence.

== Government ==
Wennington is within the Dagenham and Rainham UK Parliament constituency. The current MP is Margaret Mullane of the Labour Party. It forms part of the Rainham and Wennington electoral ward of Havering. The ward elects three councillors to Havering London Borough Council. All three of the councillors elected in the 2022 London local elections were the Conservative Party candidates.

== Geography ==
The village of Wennington is a ribbon development extending southeast of Rainham, along Wennington Road (B1335) near the junction of the A13 road and New Road (A1306). It is about 2 km (over 1 mile) north of the River Thames. It consists of mostly scattered houses and the Wennington Hall farmhouse. The village population is around 300. In the south lie the barren Wennington Marshes, which now form part of the RSPB's Rainham Marshes nature reserve.

To the west and north Wennington has a boundary with Rainham, also in Havering, formed by the Common Watercourse. To the south there is a boundary in the middle of the Thames with Erith in the London Borough of Bexley. To the east are Aveley and Purfleet in Thurrock.

== Transport ==
London Buses route 372 serves the village.

=== Nearest stations ===
- Rainham railway station
- Purfleet railway station
