= Coldharbour, Havering =

Coordinates: 51.4913°N 0.1882°E

Coldharbour
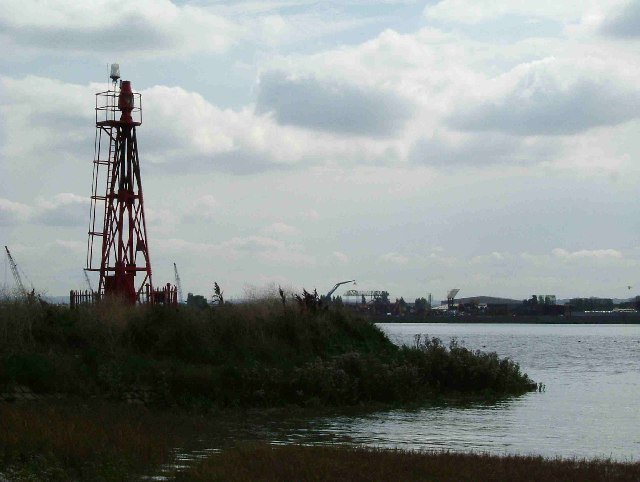
- Coldharbour Point on the River Thames

- Location within Greater London
- OS grid reference: TQ525785
- London borough: Havering
- Ceremonial county: Greater London
- Region: London
- Country: England
- Sovereign state: United Kingdom
- Post town: RAINHAM
- Postcode district: RM13
- Dialling code: 01708
- Police: Metropolitan
- Fire: London
- Ambulance: London
- UK Parliament: Dagenham and Rainham
- London Assembly: Havering and Redbridge

Coldharbour is an area of the London Borough of Havering by the River Thames and southwest of the Rainham Marshes Nature Reserve. It is the location of Coldharbour Point, where there has been a lighthouse since 1885. This point is adjacent to the town of Erith in Bexley, across the Thames.

== History ==
Coldharbour was an estate primarily in the ancient parish of Wennington. It included Little Coldharbour (also partly in Rainham), Coldharbour Point and Great Coldharbour. It was originally a marsh island.

A ferry (known as the 'short ferry' in contrast to the 'long ferry' to London) operating from Coldharbour Point to Erith (then in Kent) on the southern bank of the Thames existed from the Middle Ages until the 19th century. Plaques entitled 'Pilgrim Ferry' commemorate this in Coldharbour and Erith.

== Geography ==
The nearest accessible settlement on land is the town of Rainham, which is connected by Coldharbour Lane; the village of Wennington is also nearby but not accessible by road (both are separated by the A13 and marshlands). The area around the point is mainly industrial land known as the Freightmaster Estate depot. The London Loop passes through Coldharbour on its way east to Purfleet in Thurrock.

== Gallery ==
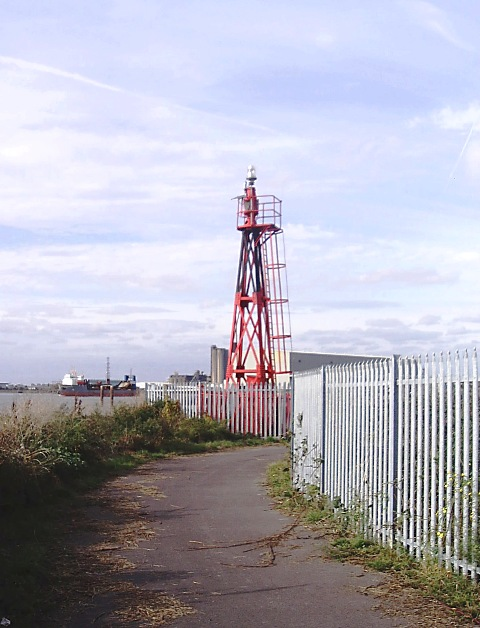
Coldharbour Point

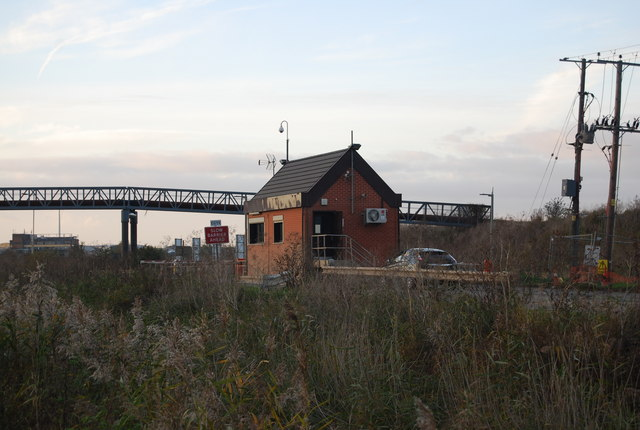
Checkpoint on Coldharbour Lane, leading to the depot

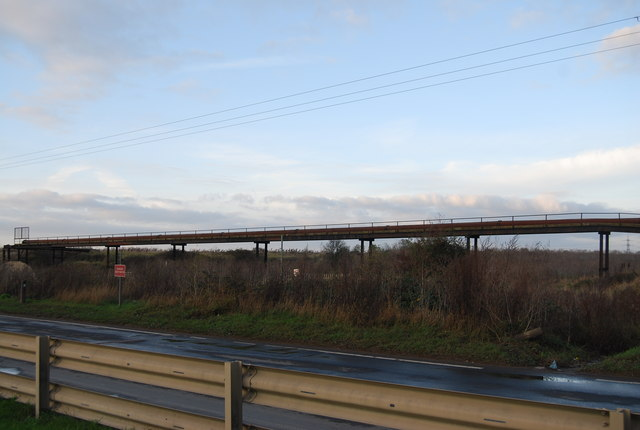
A pipeline bridge on the Rainham Marshes across the Common Watercourse

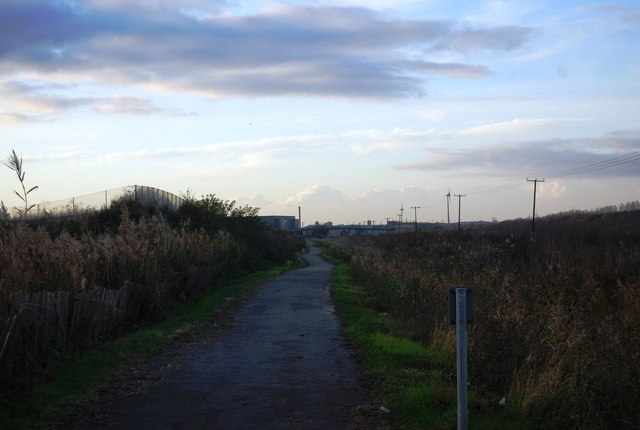
Cycleway 13, next to Coldharbour Lane

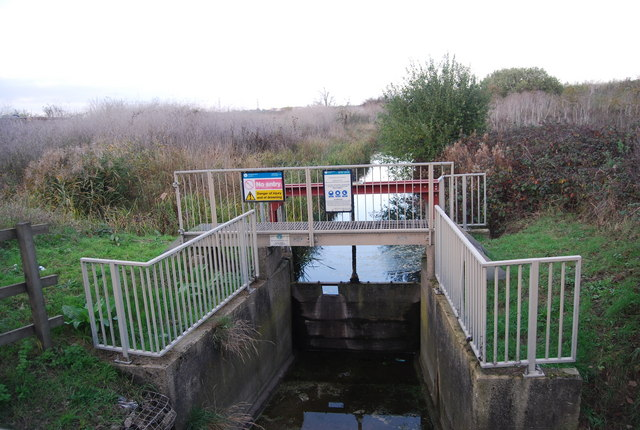
Sluice on a drainage ditch, Coldharbour Lane

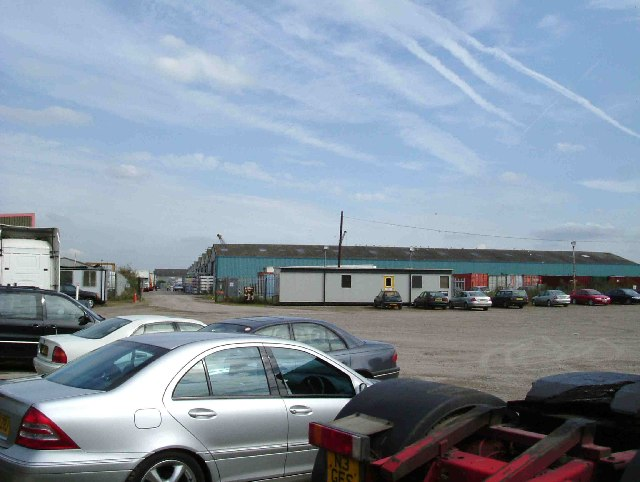
The Freighmaster Estate depot - facilities include an extensive complex of warehouses, ample parking for trucks and a helipad

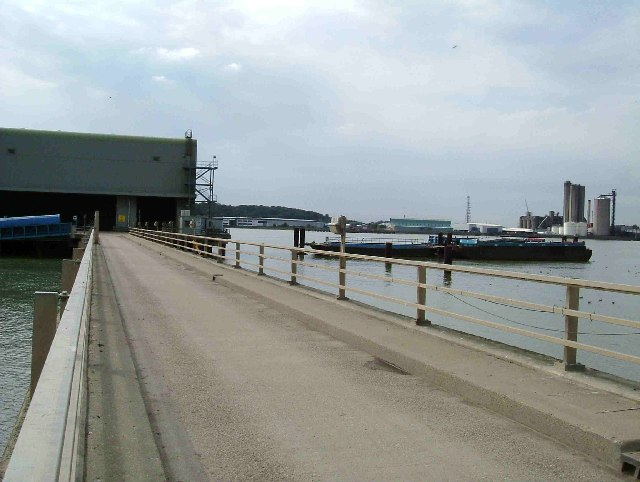
Cleanaways waste transfer depot, Erith can be seen in the background
