= Brenda Crowe (child educator) =

Brenda Iris Gunary (1920–?), married name from 1942 Chell, married name from 1949 Crowe, was an English nursery teacher and author, from 1967 to 1970 the initial National Adviser to the Pre-School Playgroups Association (PPA).

== Background ==
Her father was Ernest Edmund (or Edmond) Gunary (1887–1971), a farmer and market gardener in areas near Rainham, formerly in Essex, that are now part of the London Borough of Havering. The family business, Samuel Gunary & Sons, farmed at South Hall, Rainham, and Wennington Hall in the period c.1914 to c.1969. Her mother was Marjorie Iris Bird, her parents having married in 1919.

== Education and career ==
Brenda Gunary was a pupil at Sidcot School, from 1935 to 1938. She was then trained as a nursery teacher, attending for three years the Bedford Training College, on a course consisting largely of practical work, influenced by the ideas of Friedrich Froebel. Subsequently, she taught in Leicestershire.

During World War II Gunary, from 1942 Chell, worked in a day nursery. Later at the Mid-Essex Child Guidance Clinic, in Chelmsford, she was a remedial teacher for special needs. She qualified as an NNEB (Nursery Nurse Examination Board) tutor.

In 1966 the PPA was awarded a government grant to fund the salary of a full-time National Adviser, and Crowe was given the position, for a three-year term. Joan Conway of the Welsh PPA wrote:

Her commitment was total and she travelled all over the British Isles meeting people and children, speaking to numerous audiences about the Playgroup Movement and promoting the role of parents.

Stephanie Mathivet has proposed that 'it was the arrival of Brenda Crowe, as the first National Adviser in 1967, that heralded the clarity and refinement of the ever evolving philosophy and pedagogy of the Pre-school Playgroups Association'. Lynn Abrams maintained that in 1968 Crowe conceded that the PPA model was not applicable to areas afflicted by social deprivation. However, Mathivet's account of Crowe's involvement with the PPA shows this was not entirely true. Play groups had sprung up all over the country in very diverse areas, and while middle class parents certainly had an educational advantage in becoming involved and forming management committees, this did not prevent playgroups forming in deprived areas. These brought many advantages to parents and children as Mathivet points out in her book 'Changing Lives, Changing Life. The pedagogical perspective of the Pre-school Learning Alliance' (cited below). The PPA, under Brenda Crowe, had a commitment to equality right from the start and worked hard to achieve this aim.

With an increase of grant from the Department of Education and Science in 1971, Crowe gained a colleague in her work, Maude Henderson. A further grant in 1974 allowed the appointment of a third adviser with a remit including special needs. Funding in the 1980s came from the Department of Health and Social Security.

Crowe was a consultant involved in the 1983 ITV series Understanding Toddlers presented by Anna Ford. She continued her speaking career, in 1985 leading with Michel Odent a National Childbirth Trust study day on "Instinctive Parenting".

== Works ==
- The Playgroup Movement (first edition 1973, George Allen & Unwin; 4th edition 1983.) The later editions, revised by Meg Burford, had a foreword by Mia Kellmer Pringle.
- Living with a Toddler (1982)
- Play is a Feeling (1983, reprint 2024). In it Crowe "recalls and interprets the feelings of childhood (hers and others) from the memories of intense sensory experiences."
- Your Child and You (1986), collected articles from Woman's Realm.
- People Don't Grow by Being Measured: Recollections and Reflections of a Dyslexic Grandmother (2008), introduction by Anna Ford

== Honours and awards ==
Brenda Crowe was awarded an honorary degree by the Open University in 1979.

== Family ==
Brenda Gunary married firstly, in 1942 at St Mary and St Peter's Church, Wennington, Peter Chell of the Essex Regiment, elder son of Lieut.-Col. Randolph Arthur Chell of the Essex Regiment and his wife Lucy Ashforth Stafford. Peter Chell was killed in action in Normandy on 12 August 1944.

She married secondly, in 1948, Harold Michael G. Crowe (Mick), an insurance broker who died in 1996. They had a son Simon and a daughter Amanda, living first at Wethersfield and then at Boxford, Suffolk.

== Legacy ==
Papers from Brenda Crowe's time with the Pre-School Playgroups Association are held by the Institute of Education Archive of University College London.
