= Extreme weather in Cornwall =

Extreme weather episodes in Cornwall

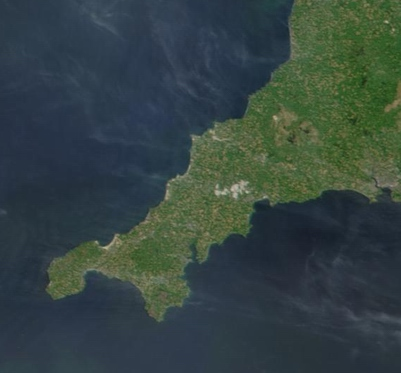
Cornwall from space, by NASA, from the NASA website Blue Marble.

Extreme weather in Cornwall refers to episodes of unusually severe or exceptional weather affecting the county of Cornwall, in southwest England. Cornwall's exposed position on the Atlantic Ocean and its relatively mild maritime climate influence the character of its extreme weather, with the county particularly susceptible to strong winds, heavy rainfall, and occasional heatwaves. Snow and prolonged periods of freezing temperatues are comparatively uncommon, although significant events have occurred.

The county's long Atlantic coastline makes Cornwall particularly exposed to European windstorms — especially during the autumn and winter months. Storms can produce damaging winds, large waves, coastal flooding, and disruption to transport and infrastructure. Heavy rainfall often causes surface-water and river flooding, particularly when persistent Atlantic weather systems affect the county, such as during the 2013–2014 Atlantic winter storms in Europe.

Meanwhile, temperature extremes are less frequent than in many other inland locations in Great Britain because of the moderating influence of the surrounding sea. Nevertheless, Cornwall has experienced both notable heatwaves and severe cold events, with temperatures varying considerably between exposed coastal areas and more sheltered inland locations. The county has also experienced occasional snowfall and snowstorms, despite its generally mild winters.

Records of extreme weather in Cornwall include exceptionally high and low temperatures, significant rainfall events, severe winds and notable snowfall. Instrumental records from official and unofficial weather stations across the county provide evidence of these events, although the length and quality of records vary between locations.

== Temperature extremes ==
Cornwall extremes by month
Month	Jan	Feb	Mar	Apr	May	Jun	Jul	Aug	Sep	Oct	Nov	Dec	Annual
Extreme highs	15.6 °C (60.1 °F)	18.4 °C (65.1 °F)	23.4 °C (74.1 °F)	26.0 °C (78.8 °F)	30.1 °C (86.2 °F)	33.9 °C (93.0 °F)	36.0 °C (96.8 °F)	34.3 °C (93.7 °F)	28.9 °C (84.0 °F)	23.2 °C (73.8 °F)	18.0 °C (64.4 °F)	16.0 °C (60.8 °F)	36.0 °C (96.8 °F)
Average highs	9.36 °C (48.85 °F)	9.38 °C (48.88 °F)	10.75 °C (51.35 °F)	12.81 °C (55.06 °F)	15.45 °C (59.81 °F)	17.74 °C (63.93 °F)	19.28 °C (66.70 °F)	19.40 °C (66.92 °F)	18.13 °C (64.63 °F)	15.20 °C (59.36 °F)	12.27 °C (54.09 °F)	10.12 °C (50.22 °F)	14.18 °C (57.52 °F)
Average lows	4.25 °C (39.65 °F)	3.92 °C (39.06 °F)	4.72 °C (40.50 °F)	5.88 °C (42.58 °F)	8.48 °C (47.26 °F)	11.14 °C (52.05 °F)	13.17 °C (55.71 °F)	13.40 °C (56.12 °F)	11.46 °C (52.63 °F)	9.25 °C (48.65 °F)	6.64 °C (43.95 °F)	4.69 °C (40.44 °F)	8.11 °C (46.60 °F)
Extreme lows	−16.0 °C (3.2 °F)	−11.3 °C (11.7 °F)	−11.2 °C (11.8 °F)	−1.5 °C (29.3 °F)	1.0 °C (33.8 °F)	4.6 °C (40.3 °F)	7.6 °C (45.7 °F)	5.7 °C (42.3 °F)	3.1 °C (37.6 °F)	−3.5 °C (25.7 °F)	−8.4 °C (16.9 °F)	−13.3 °C (8.1 °F)	−16.0 °C (3.2 °F)
Source 1: Met Office (Bude Averages)
Source 2: Roost Weather

=== Temperature records ===
Highest recorded temperatures in Cornwall
No.	Temperature	Date	Location	Ref.
1	36.0 °C (96.8 °F)	18 July 2022	Bude	
2	34.3 °C (93.7 °F)	12 August 2026	Bude	
3	33.9 °C (93.0 °F)	28 June 1976	Ellbridge	
4	32.1 °C (89.8 °F)	24 June 2026	Cardinham	
5	31.1 °C (88.0 °F)	12 August 2026	Cardinham	
6	31.0 °C (87.8 °F)	25 May 2026	Bude	
7	30.5 °C (86.9 °F)	18 July 2022	Cardinham	
=8	30.1 °C (86.2 °F)	26 May 2026	Camborne	
=8	30.1 °C (86.2 °F)	26 May 2026	Cardinham	
10	29.8 °C (85.6 °F)	26 May 2026	Camborne	

Lowest recorded temperatures in Cornwall
No.	Temperature	Date	Location	Ref.
1	−16.0 °C (3.2 °F)	2 January 1979	Ladock	
2	−15.0 °C (5.0 °F)	1 January 1979	Bastreet	
3	−13.5 °C (7.7 °F)	2 January 1979	Bastreet	
4	−12.7 °C (9.1 °F)	2 January 1979	St Johns	
5	−11.5 °C (11.3 °F)	3 January 1979	Ladock	
6	−11.5 °C (11.3 °F)	1 January 1979	Ladock	
7	−11.3 °C (11.7 °F)	10 February 1991	Bastreet	
8	−11.2 °C (11.8 °F)	3 March 1986	Bastreet	
9	−11.1 °C (12.0 °F)	1 February 1947	Bude	
10	−11.1 °C (12.0 °F)	16 February 1969	Bude	

== Extreme windstorms ==
European windstorms are deep extratropical cyclones that frequently cross northern Europe, typically from west to east, especially during the winter and autumn months. They often bring heavy rain and gales to Cornwall — particularly along the immediate coasts. Due to the localised nature of extreme wind events, both amateur and official stations may be used in these data. Met Office records do also include stations that are not affiliated with the Met Office directly to form wind speed records across the United Kingdom. The Met Office recognise the gusts recorded in exceptional events like Storm Goretti do indicate plausible records, with the limited Met Office station network simply missing these records.

Strongest wind gusts recorded in Cornwall
No.	Wind gust	Location	Date	Notes
1.	147 mph (237 km/h)	St Martin's, Isles of Scilly	8 January 2026	Possibly the UK's highest low-elevation wind gust, recorded by a PWS in the Isles of Scilly during Storm Goretti. A sustained windspeed of 115 mph (185 km/h) was also recorded.
2.	127 mph (204 km/h)	St Ives	8 January 2026	Recorded at a campsite near St Ives during Storm Goretti.
3..	123 mph (198 km/h)	Padstow	8 January 2026	Recorded at NCI Stepper Point, Padstow during Storm Goretti.
4.	118 mph (190 km/h)	Gwennap Head	15 December 1979	The highest recorded on the Met Office network in Cornwall and the English record until 2022.
5.	114 mph (183 km/h)	St Mary's, Isles of Scilly	15 December 1979	The highest recorded officially on the Isles of Scilly.
6.	113 mph (182 km/h)	Illogan	1 November 2019	Recorded by Kernow Weather Team during an unnamed freak windstorm.
7.	112 mph (180 km/h)	St Michael's Mount	8 January 2026	Over 80% of the island's trees downed overnight by Storm Goretti.
8.	107 mph (172 km/h)	Gwennap Head	25 January 1990	From the Burns' Day Storm.
9.	105 mph (169 km/h)	Lizard	15 December 1979	Southernmost headland of Great Britain.
10.	102 mph (164 km/h)	RNAS Culdrose	25 January 1990	Station record from the Burns' Day Storm.

=== Named storms in Cornwall (2015–) ===
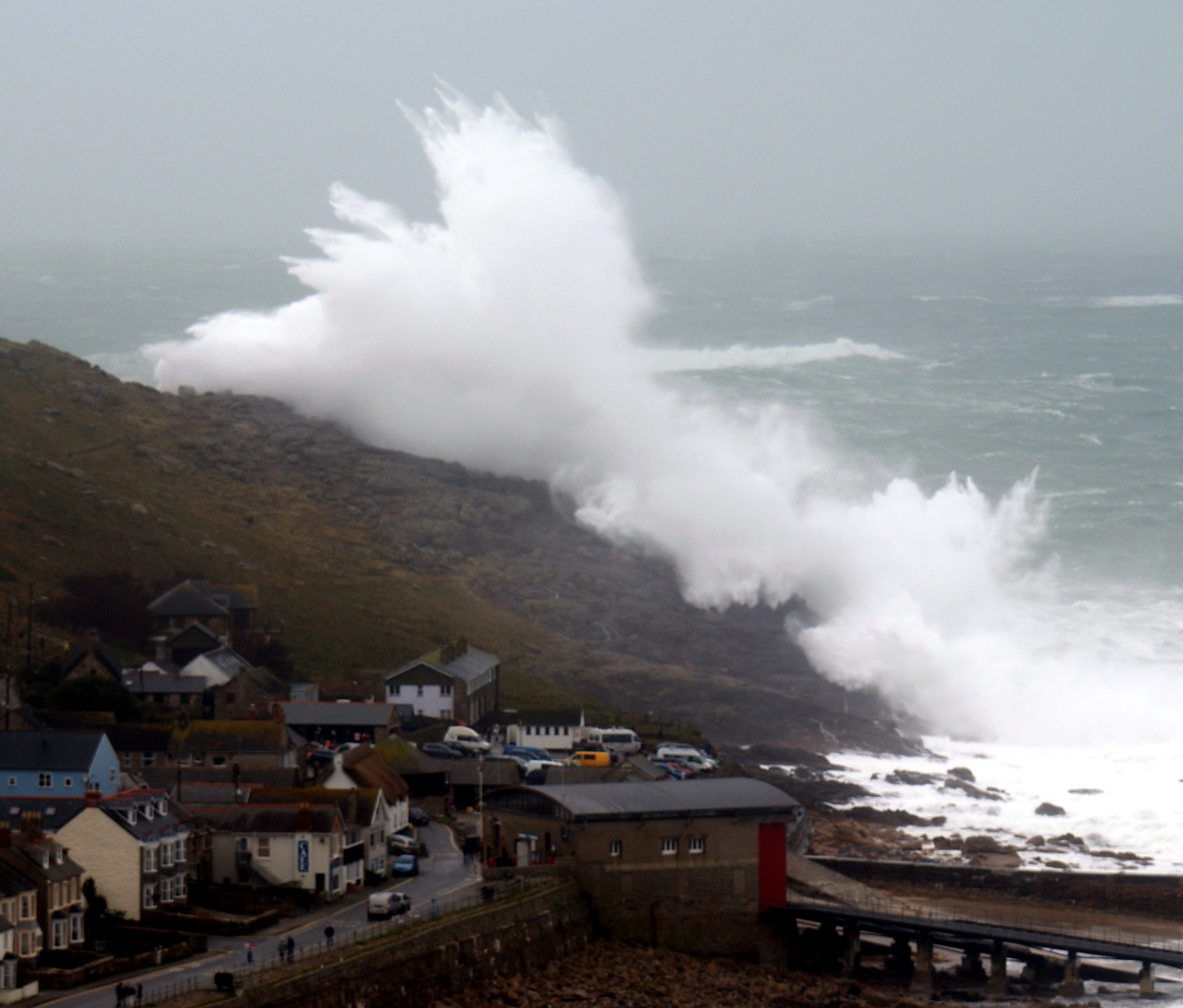
Waves crashing over the town of Sennen, Cornwall.

The Met Office began naming windstorms in 2015. Storms that affect Cornwall may also be named by AEMET, Met Éireann, Deutscher Wetterdienst, or Météo-France. On rare occasions, Cornwall may be affected by ex-hurricanes named by the NHC such as ex-Hurricane Ophelia which despite losing tropical characteristics in the cool high-latitude waters surrounding Cornwall, can still bring heavy rain and strong winds.

During Storm Imogen, a wave of 19.1 m (63 ft) was recorded off the coast of St Ives on 8 February 2016. Exactly 4 years later during Storm Ciara in 2020, waves on the northern cliffs of Cornwall sent sea spray shooting 61 m (200 ft) into the air.

== Extreme thunderstorms ==
Cornwall occasionally sees thunderstorms — either 'imported' from France or 'homegrown' over the English Channel, Atlantic Ocean, or over Cornwall proper. Cornwall typically sees between 5-9 days of thunder per year, with the U.K. as a whole slowly seeing a decline in the number of thunderstorm days per year. The most severe and frequent thunderstorms occur in spring and summer, but wintertime thunder and lightning has been observed — especially in association with volatile fronts and strong European windstorms.

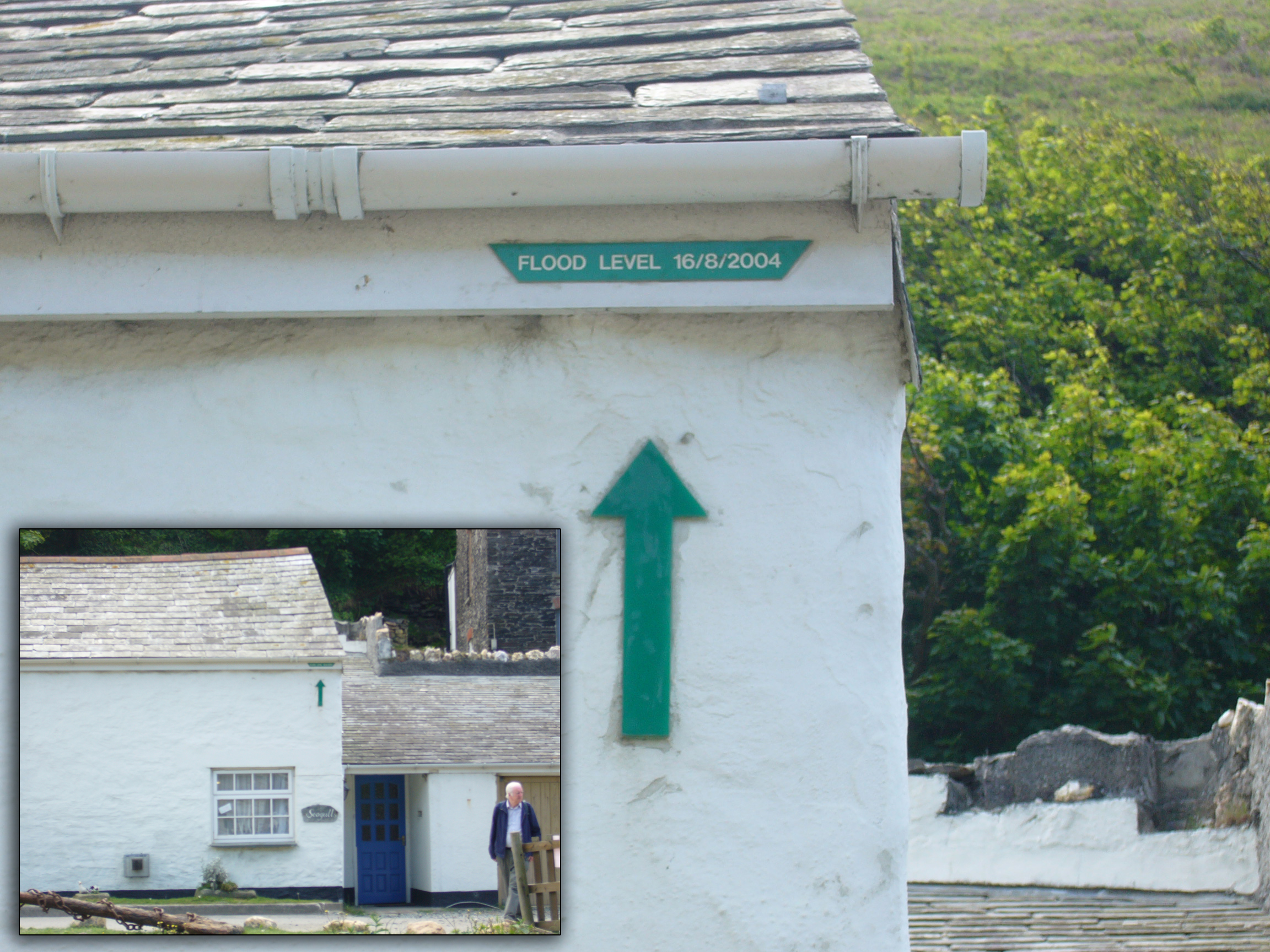
A building with the marked waterline from the Boscastle flash flooding event in 2004.

When the right oceanic winds align, peninsular convergence is possible in Cornwall. This occurs when winds from opposing directions meet, driving air upwards and sparking convective initiation. In Cornwall, this often occurs when winds on the north coast blow southerly, whilst the winds on the south coast blow northerly, forming an area where the air meets head-on. Typically, this is right over the hilly spine of Cornwall - giving the phenomenon the name Brown Willy Effect, after the highest point in Cornwall Brown Willy a hill at an elevation of 420 m (1,380 ft). This means both thunderstorms forming over Cornwall, and a 'downstream' effect which typically forces thunderstorms into neighbouring Devon and beyond into southern and central England.

=== Boscastle Flood, 2004 ===
On the 16 August 2004 a particularly strong Brown Willy effect is thought to have been responsible for the devastating floods that impacted the towns of Boscastle and Crackington Haven on the north coast of Cornwall in the 2004 Boscastle Flood. Approximately 150–200 mm of rain fell within one day, the vast majority falling in a very short timespan with a return rate of 1 in 1,300 years. The River Valency rose 2 m (6.6 ft) in an hour.

=== Notable storms ===
- 1842: A thunderstorm in the Falmouth and Penryn area caused severe damage, with two 12-year old girls killed in St Austell. A man was killed in Duloe, whilst Looe suffered flash flooding and large hailstones.
- 1846: Flash flooding at the East Wheal Rose Mine killed 39 men and boys.
- 1847: Between 10 a.m. and 6 p.m. on 7 July 1847 a severe thunderstorm over eastern Cornwall caused severe flooding, which moved 10-ton stones "considerable distances" at Camelford and destroyed railway bridges in Bodmin.
- 1958: Flash flooding in Boscastle killed one girl.
- 1976: In September, a severe storm struck Polperro, causing significant flash flooding. Cars were thrown and a single person was killed.
- 2004: 16 August, Boscastle Flood.
- 2017: On 19 July, a flash flood swept through the town of Coverack on the Lizard peninsula following strong thunderstorms. Hail the size of 50-pence coins smashed windows.

== Tornadoes ==
Rare tornadoes have been documented in Cornwall, they are typically brief and weak, but some notable events have occurred. Waterspouts and lesser whirlwinds remain much more common, but these are not classified as tornadoes.

In 1847, a 'significant' F2 tornado with winds of 113–157 mph (182–253 km/h) struck St. Neot on the 21 April 'destroying a house'. On the 9 June, 1878, another F2 tornado travelled 5.5 mi (8.9 km) from Fowey to Couch's Mill. It obstructed the railway line between Fowey and Lostwithiel with debris, uprooting trees and overturning a boat at Golant, and at Lerryn over 300 apple trees were uprooted, some debris from homes and farmsteads was found scattered 1 mi (1.6 km) away.

On the 23 January, 2025 at between 9:30-9:45 am GMT a tornado struck a holiday park at Quintrell Downs, Cornwall likely at F2 intensity. Caravans were overturned and thrown, and nearby homes suffered considerable roof damage. The tornado was spawned by lively showers associated with storm Éowyn which brought strong winds elsewhere.

At least 50 tornadoes are known to have struck Cornwall, with many more forgotten records likely. The majority of these are unrated, and of those that have been assigned intensities, all but 3 of them were F0 or F1 tornadoes with winds of 40–112 mph (64–180 km/h).

== See also ==
- List of weather records
- United Kingdom weather records
- European windstorm
- 2013-2014 Atlantic winter storms in Europe
- 2004 Boscastle flood
