= St Mary and St Peter's Church, Wennington =

Coordinates: 51.5065°N 0.2174°E

St Mary and St Peter, Wennington
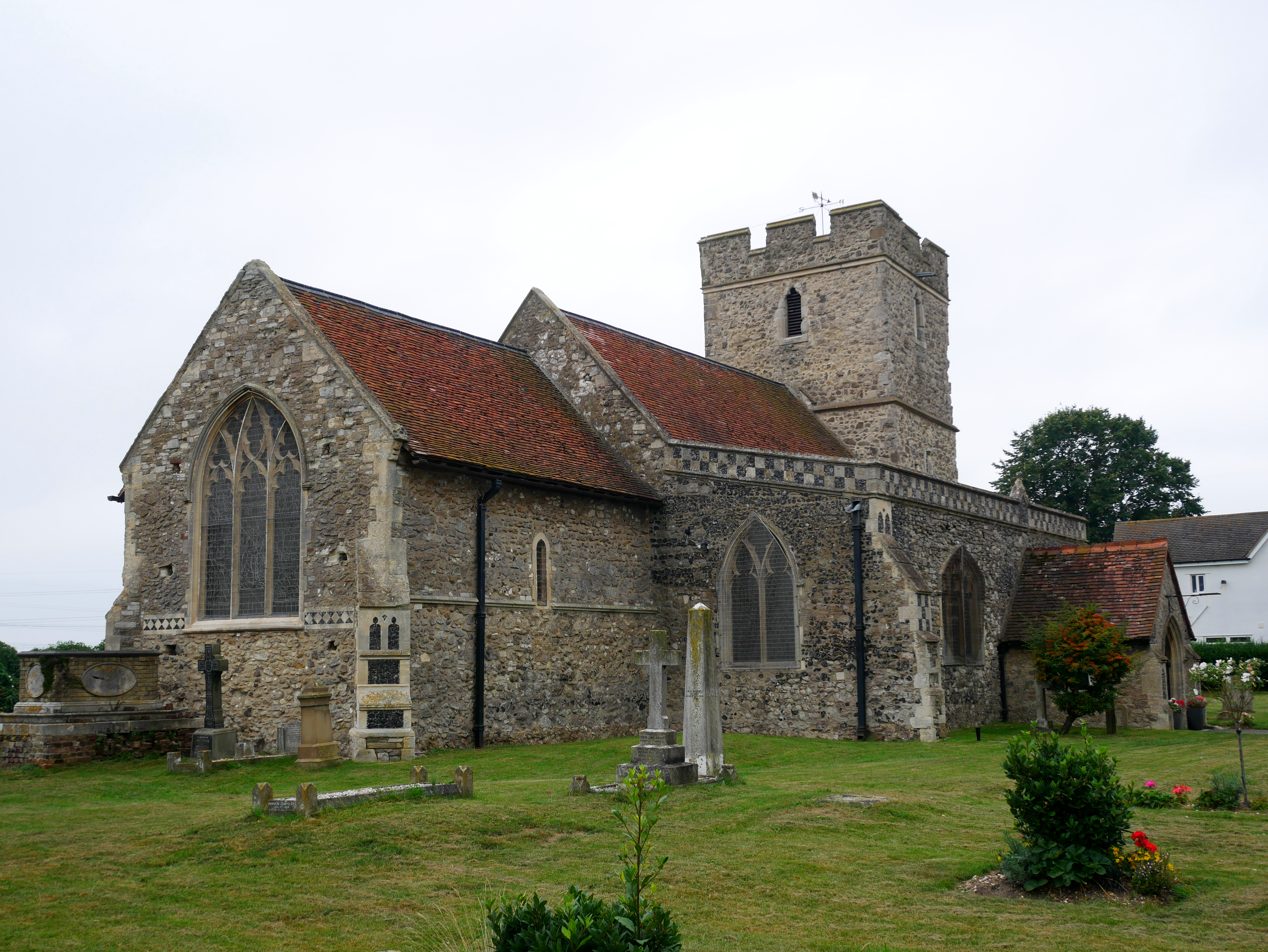
- St Mary and St Peter, Wennington
- Denomination: Church of England
- Churchmanship: Anglo-Catholicism
- Website: Church website

Administration
- Province: Province of Canterbury
- Diocese: Diocese of Chelmsford
- Archdeaconry: Archdeaconry of West Ham
- Deanery: Havering

St Mary and St Peter's Church is a Church of England parish church in Wennington, in the London Borough of Havering. It is a Grade II* listed building.

== History ==
=== Management ===
Wennington Church is recorded as being in the possession of Westminster Abbey during Richard de Belmeis' term as bishop of London early in the 12th century – this may be one said to have been given to the Abbey by Ætsere the Swarthy and his wife Ælfgyth before the Norman Conquest.

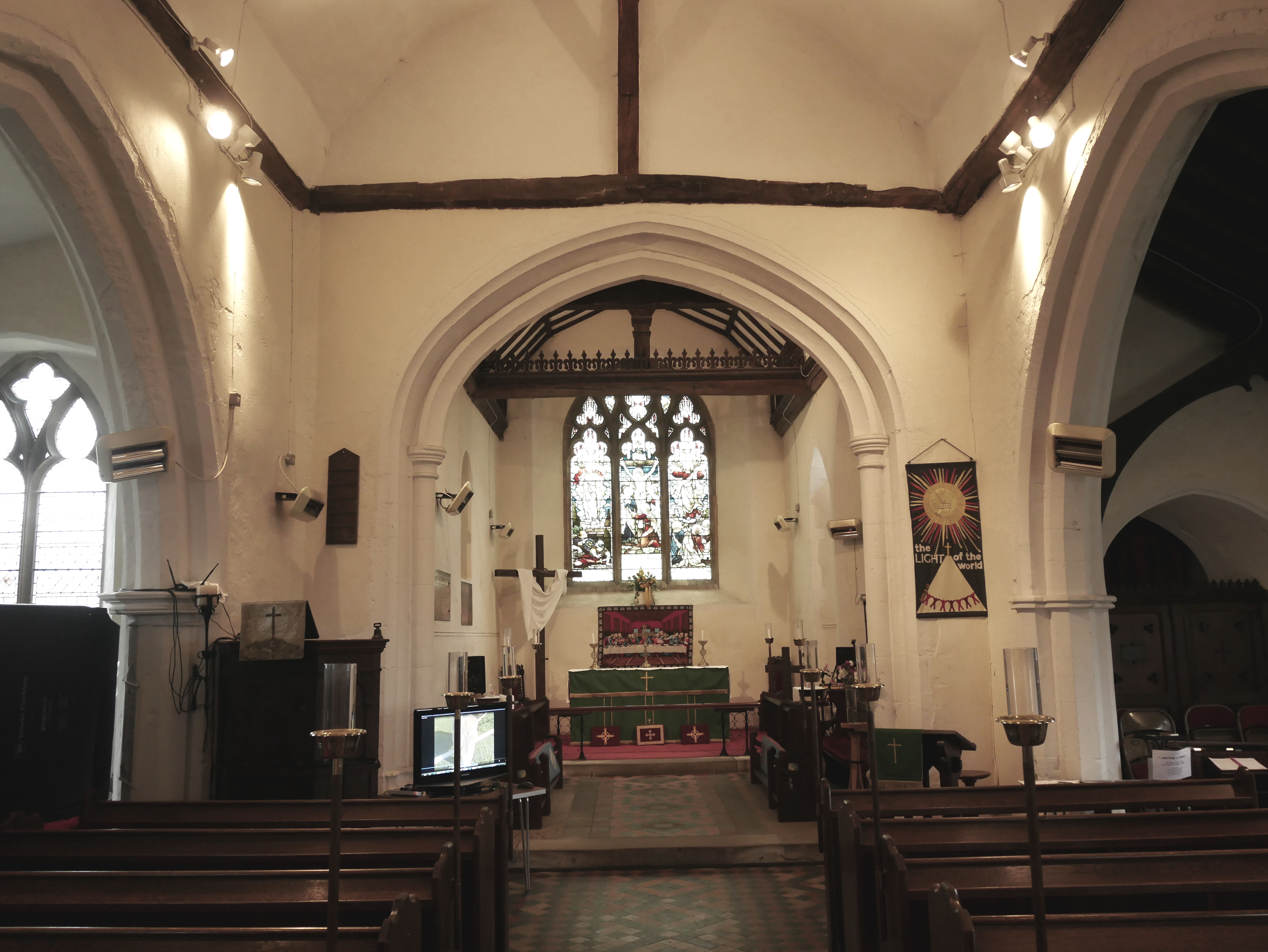
Interior of the church

In 1541 Westminster Abbey's advowson was transferred to the new but short-lived Diocese of Westminster and then to the bishop of London, who retained it until 1852, when it was granted to the bishop of Peterborough. In 1867 it was transferred from him to the Crown and then in 1958 to the Martyrs' Memorial Trust.

=== Renovations ===
The south aisle was knocked down around 1600, and extensive repairs occurred early in the 18th century. The church had fallen into disrepair by 1874 but was restored and expanded to meet a growing local population in 1885 and 1886, by rebuilding the south aisle, adding new chancel windows and an organ chamber, converting the base of the west tower into a vestry, and removing a west gallery. A new porch was added in 1900.

=== Present day ===
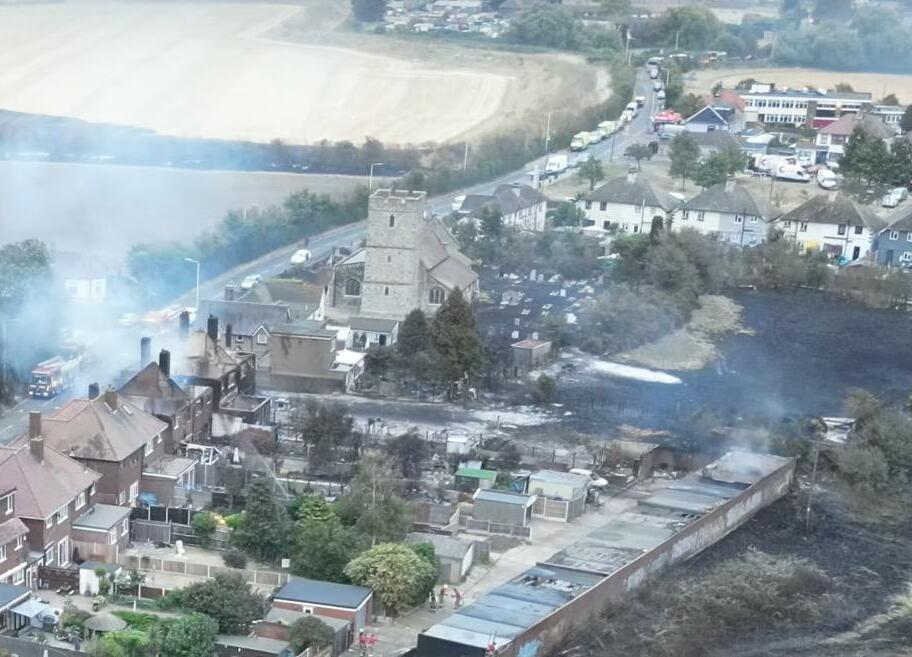
View of the church on the day of the wildfire. The fire burned through the graveyard but did not significantly damage the church

On 19 July 2022, the church survived a wildfire which destroyed much of Wennington village.

== Architecture ==
The present building is medieval with a 12th-century doorway reset in the vestry, early 13th-century font, parish chest, chancel piscina, chancel, nave and south aisle, and early 14th-century north aisle. The west tower is later 14th century, whilst the chancel arch and nave roof were both rebuilt in the late 15th or early 16th century.
