= 2022 United Kingdom heatwaves =

Periods of unusually hot weather in the summer of 2022

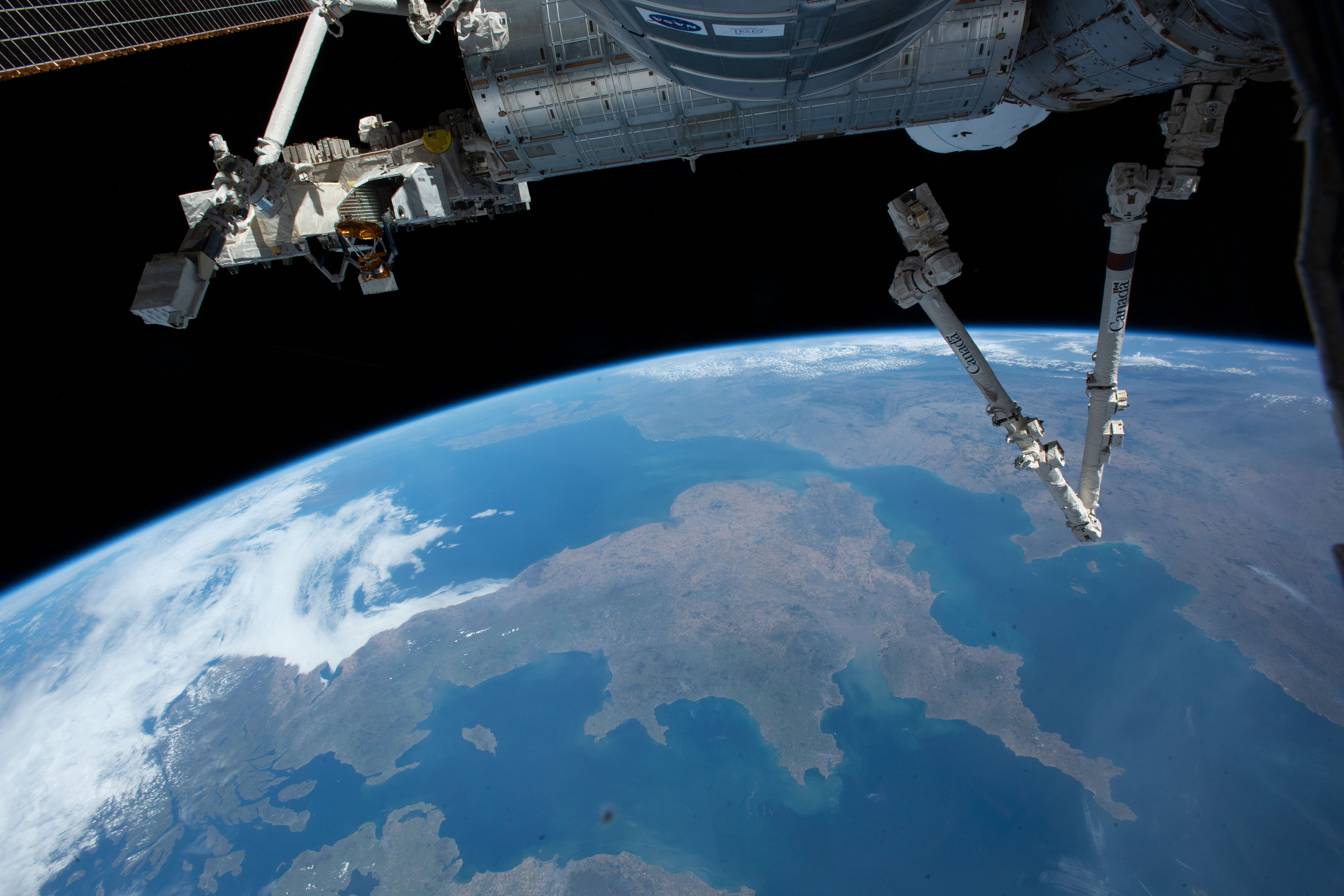
The UK's largest island, Great Britain, seen from the International Space Station on 12 August 2022 showing clear skies and dry ground

The 2022 United Kingdom heatwaves were part of several heatwaves across Europe and North Africa. The United Kingdom experienced three heatwaves; the first was for three days in June, the second for three days in July, and the third for six days in August. Climatologists say the extreme heat was due to climate change. 2022 was the UK's warmest year since records began in 1884, with an average annual temperature above 10 °C (50 °F) for the first time. The 2022 heatwaves contributed to the death of nearly 3000 people, most of whom were 65 years or older.

There were also more grass fires and wildfires than average, and in August a drought was declared in many regions. There were nearly 25,000 wildfires across the country.

The Met Office issued its first red warning for extreme heat on 8 July, which affected all of central and southern England and was in place for 18 and 19 July. On 15 July, it declared a national emergency after the red warning was put in place. On 19 July, a record temperature of 40.3 °C (104.5 °F) was recorded and verified by the Met Office in Coningsby, England, breaking the previous record set in 2019 of 38.7 °C (101.7 °F) in Cambridge, England.

== June heatwave ==
June 2022 United Kingdom heatwave
Meteorological history
- Date: 15 June 2022 - 17 June 2022
- Heatwave
- Max temp: 32.7 °C (90.9 °F), recorded at Santon Downham, Suffolk on 17 June

Overall effects
- Areas affected: United Kingdom

On the three days from 15 June to 17 June, temperatures in Kew, London, reached at least 28 °C (82 °F), the official heatwave threshold at that location for that time of year. On 17 June, a high of 32.7 °C (90.9 °F) was recorded in Santon Downham, Suffolk.

A level two heat-health alert was issued by the UK Health Security Agency to cover the East Midlands and south-west on 15 June. A level three alert was issued for London and South East England the following day.

The heatwave ended on 18 June, as temperatures fell by an average of 10–15 °C (18–27 °F). A "huge cluster" of thunderstorms moved across the UK, prompting the Met Office to issue a yellow warning for lightning for Southern England (lightning warnings had only been issued on three previous occasions). It was also reported that the UK could experience up to a further four heatwaves over the summer, and weather experts had called for heatwaves to be given names in the same way that winter storms are named.

=== Impact on resorts ===
Crowds arrived at swimming pools, parks, seaside destinations in the south and east of England early in the morning of 17 June. Seafront car parks at Bournemouth, Dorset, were said to be full by midday.

== July heatwave ==
July 2022 United Kingdom heatwave
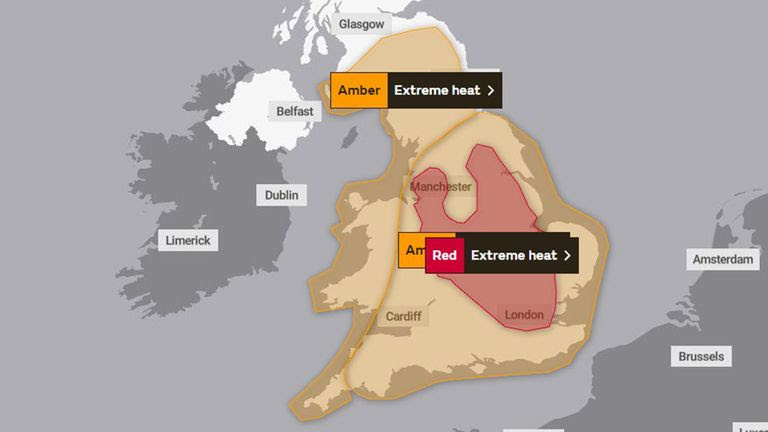
- A map of the weather warnings in the UK that were in place on 18 and 19 July 2022

Meteorological history
- Duration: 17 July 2022 - 19 July 2022
- Heat wave
- Max temp: 40.3 °C (104.5 °F), recorded at Coningsby, Lincolnshire on 19 July

Overall effects
- Fatalities: 3,200
- Areas affected: United Kingdom

On 8 July, the Met Office issued a heat-health alert warning that there was a 90% probability of level 3 alert criteria being met in parts of England on 9 July. On 12 July, the Met Office issued an amber extreme-heat warning for 17 July, which was extended from 17 to 19 July. It was stated that the high temperatures could extend into the following week. By 13 July, the water levels at the Thruscross Reservoir fell low enough to reveal the ruins of West End, a village which was flooded when the reservoir was built in 1966.

On 15 July, the UKHSA increased the Heatwave Alert Level to 4, "illness and death occurring among the fit and healthy – and not just in high-risk groups". The Met Office issued its first ever red extreme-heat warning after there were forecasts of over 40 °C (104 °F) in some parts of England, and a national emergency was declared. The warning was in place from 18 to 19 July, with most of England being affected.

The amber extreme-heat warning was extended to cover Cornwall, west Wales and parts of southern Scotland. A number of schools announced they would either close or allow pupils to wear PE kit in place of their school uniform on the hottest days.

On 17 July, the first day of the amber warning, the highest temperature recorded was 33 °C (91.4 °F) in Hawarden, Wales. The highest temperature in England was 32 °C (89.6 °F) in Nantwich, and the highest in Scotland was 26.4 °C (79.5 °F) in Auchincruive. Northern Ireland reached 27.7 °C (81.9 °F) in Armagh.

On 18 July, the first day of the red warning, temperatures reached 38.2 °C (100.8 °F) in Pitsford, Northamptonshire. Wales broke its record for the highest recorded temperature, with 37.1 °C (98.8 °F) recorded in Hawarden. The Channel Islands had a new record temperature as 38 °C (100.4 °F) was recorded in St Helier. The highest temperature in Scotland was 31.3 °C (88.3 °F) in Aboyne, and the highest in Northern Ireland was 31.1 °C (88.0 °F) in Derrylin. Cornwall reached 36.0 °C (96.8 °F) in Bude, breaking the county's record of 33.9 °C (93.0 °F) set during the 1976 British Isles heatwave.

Between 18 and 19 July, the United Kingdom experienced its highest recorded minimum nighttime temperature, at 26.8 °C (80.2 °F) at Shirburn Model Farm, Oxfordshire. This is an increase of 2.9 °C (5.2 °F) from the previous record, set in Brighton at 23.9 °C (75.0 °F) in August 1990. Temperatures in many other parts of the country did not fall below 25 °C (77 °F), giving the UK its warmest tropical night on record.

On 19 July, a temperature of 40.3 °C (104.5 °F) was recorded at Coningsby, Lincolnshire, the hottest temperature ever recorded in the United Kingdom. Before that day, the previous record of 38.7 °C (101.7 °F) was recorded in Cambridge during the 2019 European heatwaves. The Met Office reported that this record was broken at 46 stations across England on 19 July, six of which recorded temperatures at or above 40 °C (104 °F), stating that the "extreme heat was far more intense and widespread than previous comparable heatwaves". Many locations broke their previous record temperatures by large margins; for example, Durham reached 36.9 °C (98.4 °F), breaking its previous record of 32.9 °C (91.2 °F) by 4 °C (7.2 °F). Scotland had its highest temperature ever after 34.8 °C (94.6 °F) was recorded at Charterhall, breaking the record of 32.9 °C (91.2 °F) recorded during the 2003 European heatwave. Aysgarth Falls, a popular waterfall in the Yorkshire Dales, almost completely dried up after the high temperatures and no rainfall in the area for many weeks.

British minister Kit Malthouse told Parliament that at least 13 people died in water-related incidents during the heatwave, and that at least 41 properties were destroyed in London and more than a dozen elsewhere in Britain.

=== Impact ===
==== Transport ====
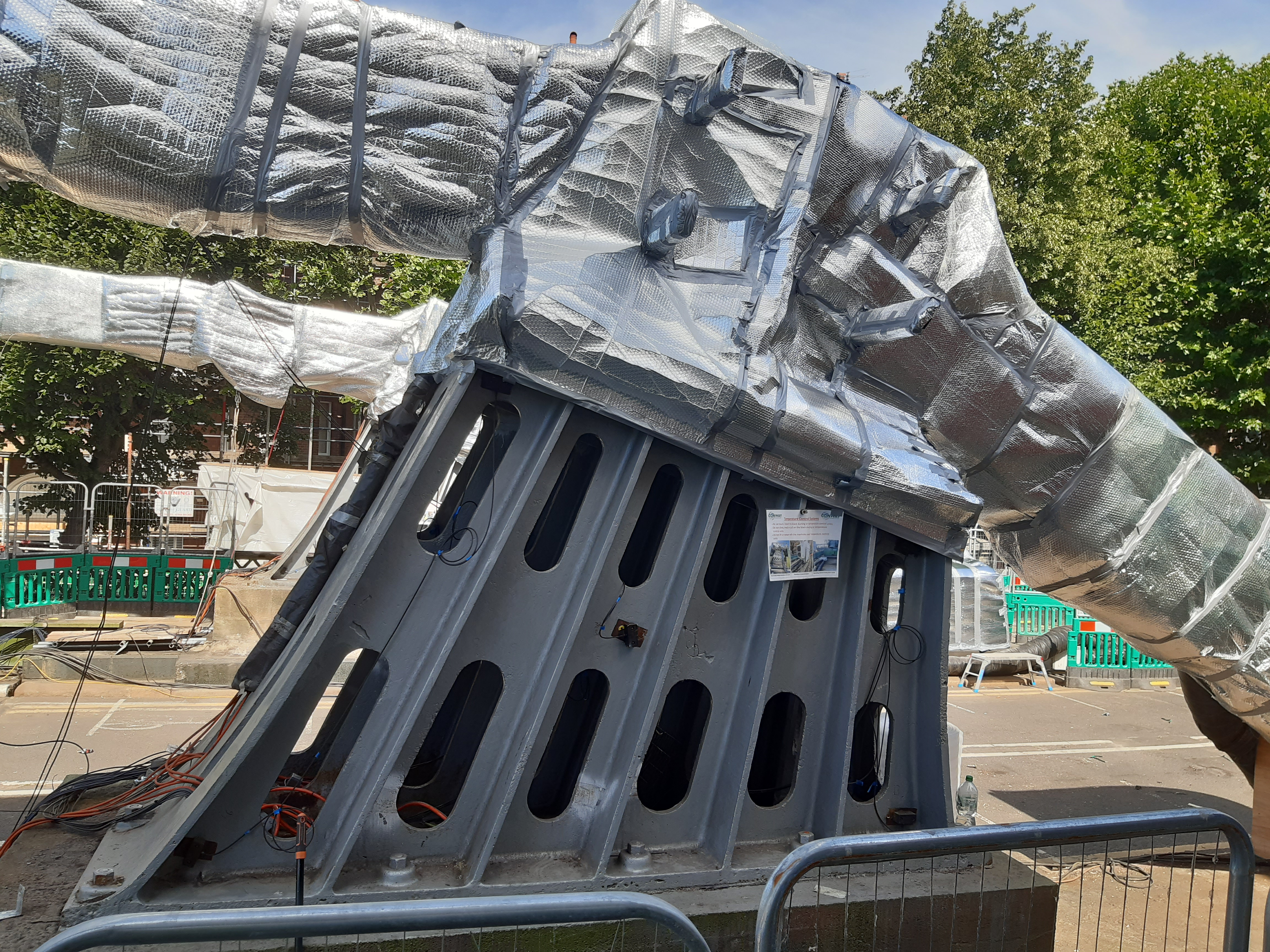
Temperature control systems and foil insulation added to Hammersmith Bridge, London, to prevent heat damage

Network Rail announced that the East Coast Main Line would close on most of the day on 19 July, for all stations between London King's Cross and York and Leeds. Many train operating companies, including Greater Anglia, Great Western Railway and London North Eastern Railway, introduced amended timetables, imposing speed restrictions on their trains to avoid track buckling. Transport for London urged people to make only essential journeys on 18 and 19 July.

On 18 July, all flights at Luton Airport were suspended after the high temperatures led to a surface defect on the runway. Flights out of the airport resumed at 17:40 BST (16:40 GMT), more than two hours after they stopped just after 15:00 BST. The RAF halted all flights in and out of Brize Norton, the UK's largest RAF station, because "the runway melted". The rail temperature in Suffolk hit 62 °C (144 °F), which was the highest-ever recorded in the UK.

On 19 July, Network Rail issued a "do not travel" warning ahead of the extreme temperatures. No services ran into or out of London King's Cross all day, and no Thameslink or Great Northern services were running north of London. East Midlands Railway was running very limited services between Derby, Nottingham, Luton, Bedford and London St Pancras, which stopped entirely during the hottest part of the day. The East Coast Main Line south of York was closed, as well as the Sheffield Supertram network. All trains between London Euston and Milton Keynes Central were suspended after a fire began by the track.

Roads across the country began to melt, as surface temperatures exceeded 54 °C (129 °F) in Lincolnshire. Among these roads was the A14, which was closed westbound between J36 and J35 for hours after a part of the road "rose and then cracked". Part of the A11 was closed both ways after there was damage to one of the lanes.

==== Retail ====
A corner shop in Scunthorpe lost around £1,000 worth of goods when its entire stock of chocolate melted during the heatwave.

Major supermarkets in London reported having sold out of bottled water, ice cream, and ice lollies during the heatwave, and increased sales of paddling pools and burgers. Waitrose reported a 36 per cent year on year increase in the sales of ice cream. John Lewis reported a 709 per cent year on year increase in sales of fans and air conditioning units. Iceland reported 16 July 2022 as its best ever day for ice cream sales, at 12 per cent above its previous highest day, which was in 2019. Ice cream parlours struggled to meet the increase in demand.

Luxury chocolate products retailer, Hotel Chocolat, suspended their delivery service because of the hot weather.

==== Berry farming ====
There was an impact on berry farming as hot weather increases the demand for them, and good weather helps farmers to meet that demand as berries ripen quicker. Farmers dropped the prices of strawberries and cherries as bumper crops, about 10-15 per cent more than usual, were produced during the heatwave. Low rainfall and prolonged sunshine in Kent, Herefordshire, Lancashire, and Norfolk provided excellent growing conditions, promoting the strong growth of ripe sweet berries.

==== Seaside resorts ====
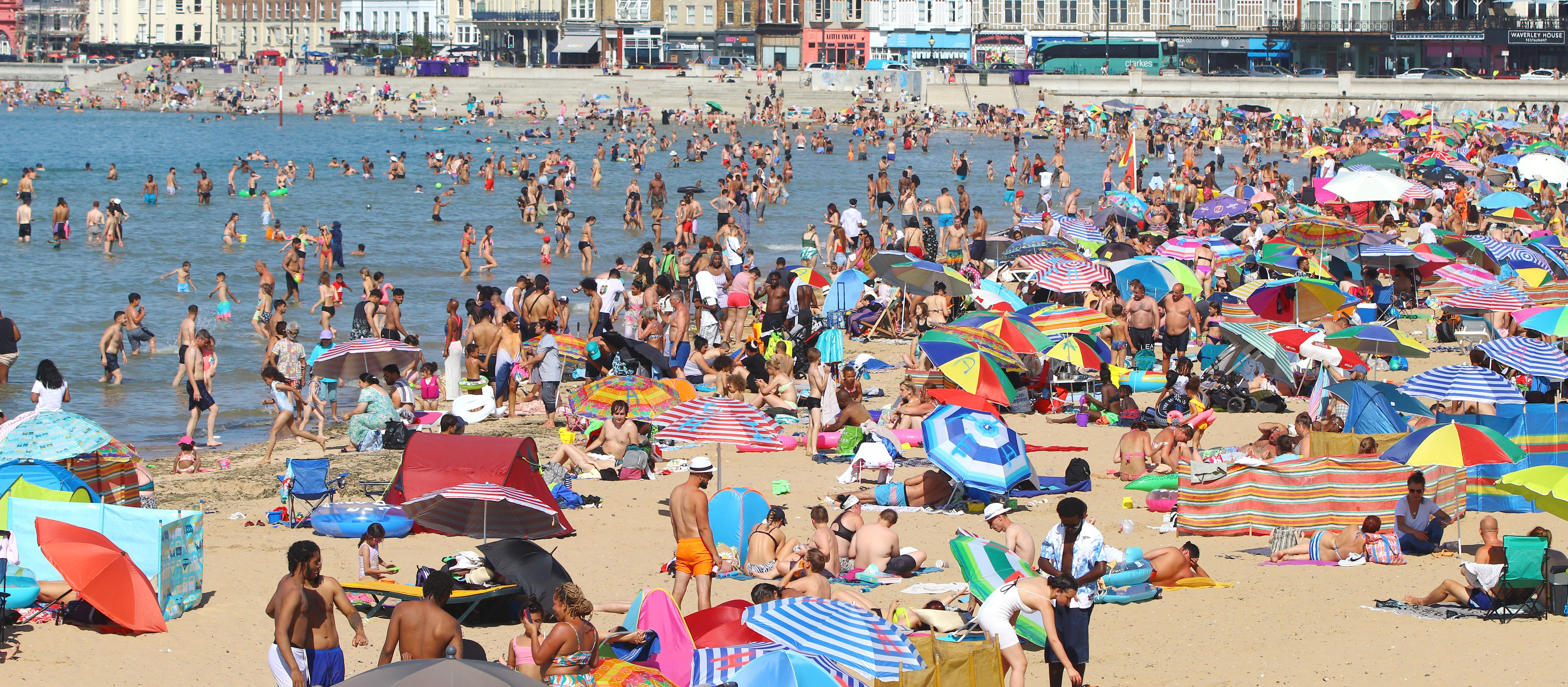
Margate beach on 19 July 2022

Between 10 and 13 July there was an average increase of 15 per cent in the number of visitors to seaside resorts compared to the previous year.

==== Utilities ====
On 25 July, Bloomberg News reported that South East London had narrowly avoided experiencing a blackout on 20 July, after the increase in demand for electricity caused by the hot weather. It was prevented by the National Grid purchasing electricity from Belgium at the highest price the UK had ever paid. They were reported to have paid £9,724 per megawatt hour, 5,000% more than the typical price.

=== Aftermath ===
Weather forecasters from the BBC, Met Office and the Royal Meteorological Society were subjected to online abuse and questioned validity over their coverage of the heatwave, most prompted by reports that linked it to climate change.

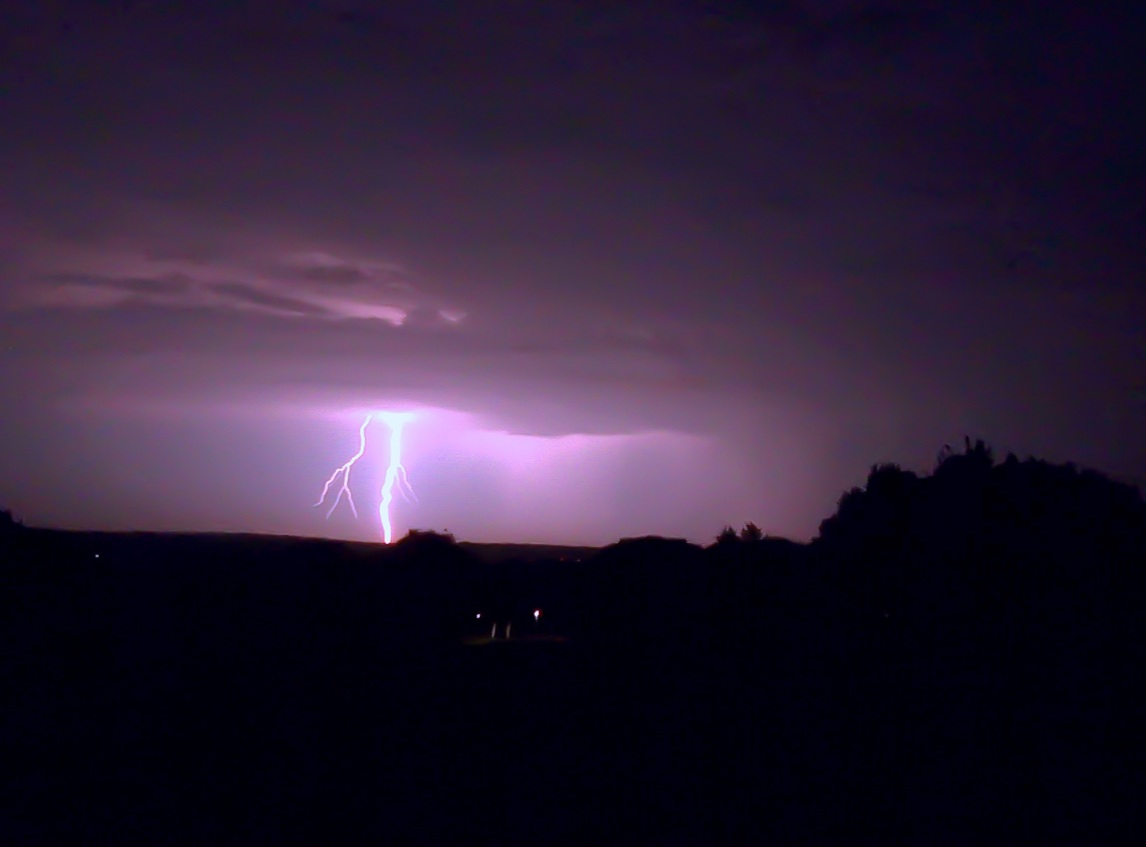
Lightning strike on 19 July, the hottest day of the heatwave, as seen from the University of Kent, Canterbury.

On 19 July, steep lapse rates in the mid troposphere associated with the plume of hot air led to the development of a line of elevated dry thunderstorms that initiated along a cold front ahead of an approaching upper trough, affecting southern England. These storms produced very little precipitation, with accumulations of just 1-2mm in places. This, combined with frequent cloud-to-ground lightning and dry vegetation, created additional fire hazards. Several thousand lightning strikes were detected, causing at least one residential fire.

On 3 August, Marks and Spencer announced that it would stop selling disposable barbecues "to help protect open spaces and reduce the risk of fires". Their decision followed calls by London Fire Brigade for retailers to stop selling them. Along with Aldi and Waitrose, who stopped in March over concern about the impact of their use on the environment, Sainsbury's and Tesco joined the list of supermarkets to stop selling disposable barbecues on 11 August, and were followed by Morrisons and the Co-op the next day.

== August heatwave ==
August 2022 United Kingdom heatwave
Meteorological history
- Duration: 9 August 2022 - 15 August 2022
- heatwave
- Max temp: 34.9 °C (94.8 °F), recorded at Crawley, West Sussex on 13 August

Overall effects
- Areas affected: United Kingdom

Another heatwave began on 9 August. An amber extreme-heat weather warning for most of England and Wales was put in place, as well as a level 3 heat health alert for central and southern England and a level 2 alert for northern England.

In August, Tom Morgan, a Met Office meteorologist, said that "temperatures will not go as high as they did during July" but will last over "a prolonged period" with "temperatures in the low-30s". On 8 August the UK Health Security Agency issued a level 3 heat health alert for central and southern England effective from 9 to 13 August, which was later extended to 14 August.

The highest temperature recorded in the UK on 11 August was 34.2 °C (93.6 °F) in Wiggonholt, West Sussex. The London Fire Brigade assistant commissioner said that in the first week of August 2021 they attended 42 grassland and wildland fires, whilst in the same week in 2022 they attended 340, an increase of over 700%.

On 13 August, a set of safety barriers on the A63 road at South Cave buckled in the heat, less than a year after being installed the previous winter. A station near Crawley in West Sussex recorded 34.9 °C (94.8 °F), the highest temperature of the heatwave.

The highest temperature on 14 August was 34.1 °C (93.4 °F), recorded in Charlwood, Surrey.

At least three people drowned.

=== Rain ===
Although 14 August was the final day of the extremely hot weather, temperatures remained above the seasonal average into the following day. On 15 August, heavy rain and thunderstorms moved across the UK. The Met Office issued three days of weather alerts for 15, 16 and 17 August, warning of a risk of flash flooding in some areas. An amber weather warning for thunderstorms was issued for parts of south-west England, covering most of Devon and parts of Cornwall and Somerset.

Torrential rain and thunderstorms brought flash flooding to parts of London and South East England on 17 August. The heavy rain also resulted in raw sewage being discharged into the sea in some places after sewers overflowed. A number of pollution warnings were in place for beaches in England and Wales.

=== Impact ===
==== Retail ====
There was another increase in ice cream sales, during the August heatwave, with the smaller retailers having challenges meeting the demand.

==== Gardening ====
Because of the prolonged hot weather, gardeners reported an increased ability to grow plants that would usually have difficulty flourishing in the UK, such as figs and avocados.

== Impact on health ==
Increasingly intense and prolonged heat periods can have dire health consequences, especially in cities. The 2022 heatwaves contributed to nearly 3000 all-cause excess deaths – meaning people who are not expected to die during this period. This represents the highest number of deaths during heatwaves since 2004. Most of the extra deaths occurred in those aged over 65. Heatwave-related excess deaths in the over-65s age group have increased by 146% since 2017.

== Drought ==
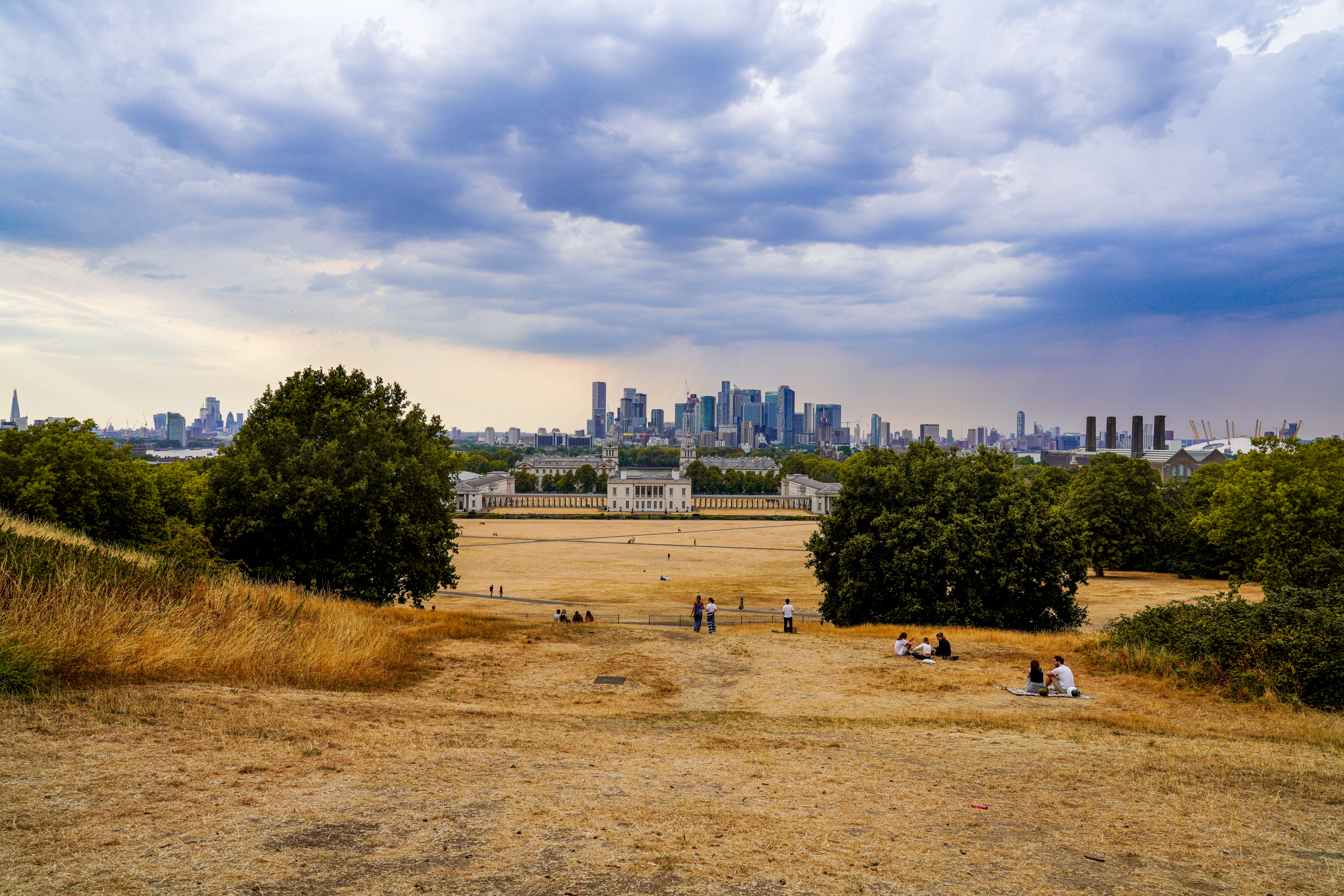
Greenwich Park, London, August 2022

The Met Office said rainfall between January and June 2022 was the lowest since 1976, giving England its driest start to the year for 46 years. It was confirmed that England had experienced its driest July since 1935, with parts of the country having the least rainfall on record. The south east and central southern England had the driest July since records began in 1836, with an average of 5.0mm rainfall.

On 26 July, and with water supplies beginning to run low, the National Drought Group met to discuss a strategy for dealing with the conditions. Although the group stopped short of declaring a drought, it was reported the UK's water companies had started to put the early stages of their drought policies into motion by urging people to conserve water. On 29 July, Southern Water became the first water company to introduce a hosepipe ban. The measure, affecting Hampshire and the Isle of Wight, was scheduled to come into force from 5 August. Following a prolonged dry spell in South East England, on 3 August South East Water announced a temporary hosepipe ban for Kent and Sussex from 12 August. On 4 August Welsh Water announced a hosepipe ban for Pembrokeshire and parts of Carmarthenshire, which had experienced their driest summer since 1976, commencing on 19 August. On 7 August, with another heatwave expected to occur in the coming days, George Eustace, the Secretary of State for the Environment, urged water companies to impose further hosepipe bans. On 9 August Thames Water announced plans to introduce a hosepipe ban for its 15 million customers; the ban was subsequently confirmed to begin on 24 August. On 12 August, Yorkshire Water became the fifth water company to announce a hosepipe ban, which came into force on 26 August. It was their first hosepipe ban in 27 years.

On 12 August, a drought was officially declared in eight of the 14 Environment Agency areas: Devon and Cornwall, Solent and South Downs, Kent and South London, Herts and North London, East Anglia, Thames, Lincolnshire and Northamptonshire, and the East Midlands. John Curtin, executive director of local operations for the Environment Agency, warned lack of water would be an issue for several months, and that the UK would need above average rainfall through the autumn and winter to avoid another drought in 2023. A drought was declared in the West Midlands region on 23 August, with the Environment Agency warning it had been using groundwater resources and reserves from reservoirs in Wales to help maintain the flows of the River Severn, which supplies six million people in the area. On 30 August a drought was declared in south-west England, covering Bristol, Somerset, South Gloucestershire, Dorset and parts of Wiltshire.

On 19 August, the Welsh Government and Natural Resources Wales declared a drought in south west Wales, and specifically in north Ceredigion, Teifi, Pembrokeshire, Carmarthen, Swansea, Llanelli, Neath Port Talbot and Bridgend.

== Meteorology ==
According to Met Office estimates, extreme heat has been made ten times more likely because of climate change in the United Kingdom. Extreme event attribution showed that "without human-caused climate change temperatures of 40°C in the UK would have been extremely unlikely".

In July, the jet stream—a strong air current moving west to east—split into two branches, shielding Europe from storms. This makes it more likely that weather patterns persist over a longer period. It is unclear whether these jet stream events happen more under climate change.

Provisional figures published by the Met Office in September 2022 indicated England had experienced its joint hottest summer during 2022, with an average temperature of 17.1 °C (62.8 °F) during June, July and August. This was comparable with the summer of 2018. Overall, 2022 was the UK's warmest year since records began in 1884, with an average annual temperature above 10 °C (50 °F) for the first time.

Met Office data indicated that temperature records were broken at 56 of the UK's 109 oldest weather stations during the July heatwave.

== Media coverage ==
Social media misinformation and conspiracy theories compared the July heatwave to the 1976 heatwave, and claimed that the effect of both were exaggerated. The maximum temperature in 2022 exceeded 1976's peak temperature of 35.9 °C (96.6 °F). BBC News reported that "suggestions that there is nothing unusual about this heatwave appear to have found a willing audience among climate change sceptics". An image circulated on social media claiming that the colour scale of new-style Met Office forecast maps had been "designed to look like fear and destruction", with the meteorologist who had created the map's colour scales saying that although the scale had been altered in 2021 for the benefit of colour blind viewers, the image being shared had been doctored to exaggerate this.

On 19 July 2022, Extinction Rebellion activists smashed windows of The News Building in London in response to coverage of the heatwave by The Sun and The Times.

Writing for the Columbia Journalism Review, journalist Jon Allsop criticised right-leaning British publications in particular for downplaying and detracting from the effects on the hottest days before covering them more seriously following the series of wildfires. He analysed American media coverage and determined it to be heavily focused on the United Kingdom despite heatwaves elsewhere in Europe, the United States and the Global South due to inequity and the image of a "cold and wet Britain". Allsop also found that, while climate change has had more attention in stories on the heatwave, media exploration of its role and impact is still limited and lacking.

== See also ==
- 2026 United Kingdom heatwaves
- Drought in the United Kingdom
- Climate change in Europe
- List of heat waves
