= Rainham Marshes Nature Reserve =

Marshland nature reserve in east London

Coordinates: 51.490°N 0.225°E

Inner Thames Marshes
- Site of Special Scientific Interest
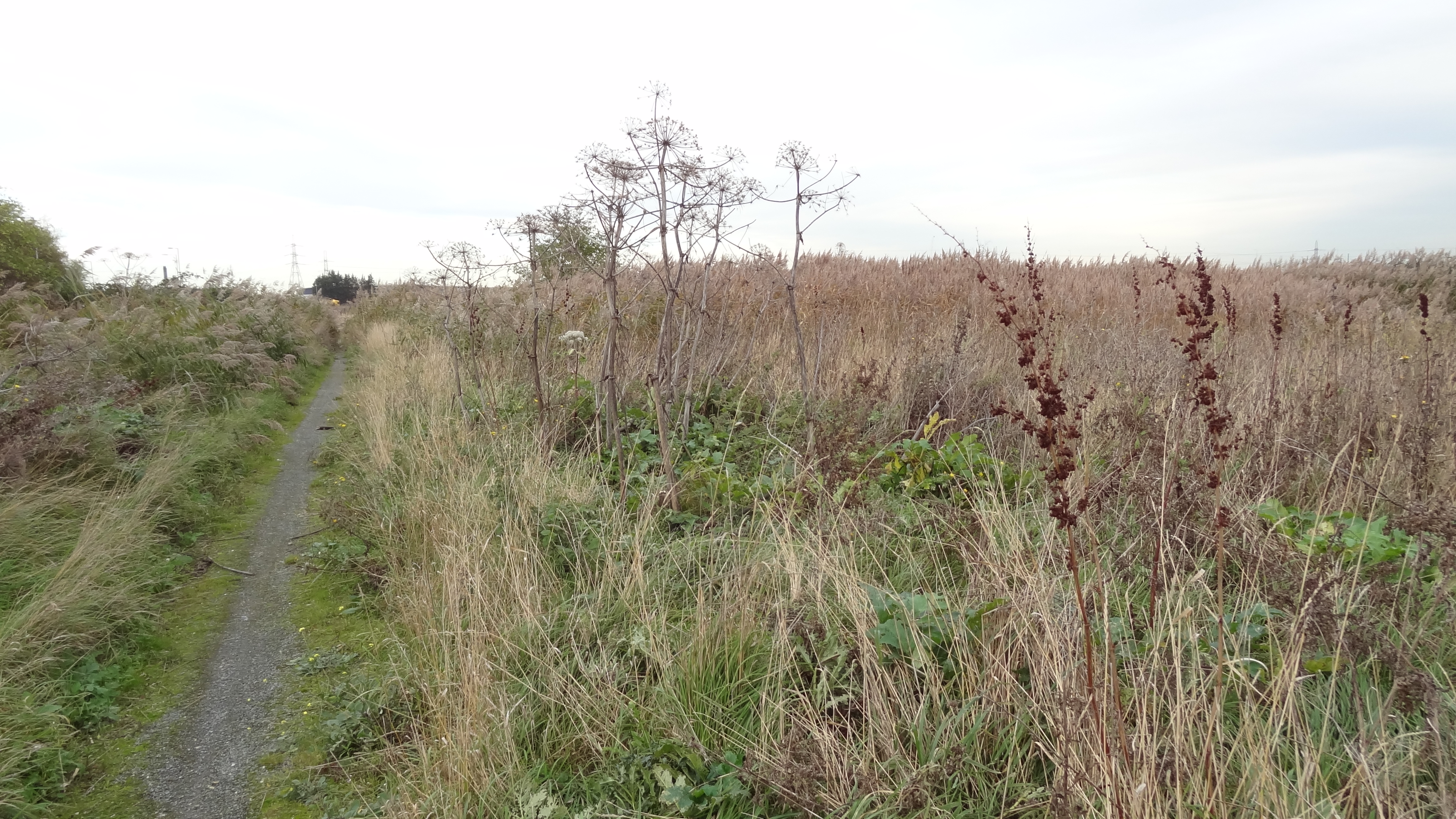
- Location of Inner Thames Marshes.
- Area of search: Greater London; Essex
- Grid reference: TQ531800
- Interest: Biological
- Area: 479.3 ha (1,184 acres)
- Notification date: 1986
- Location map: Magic Map

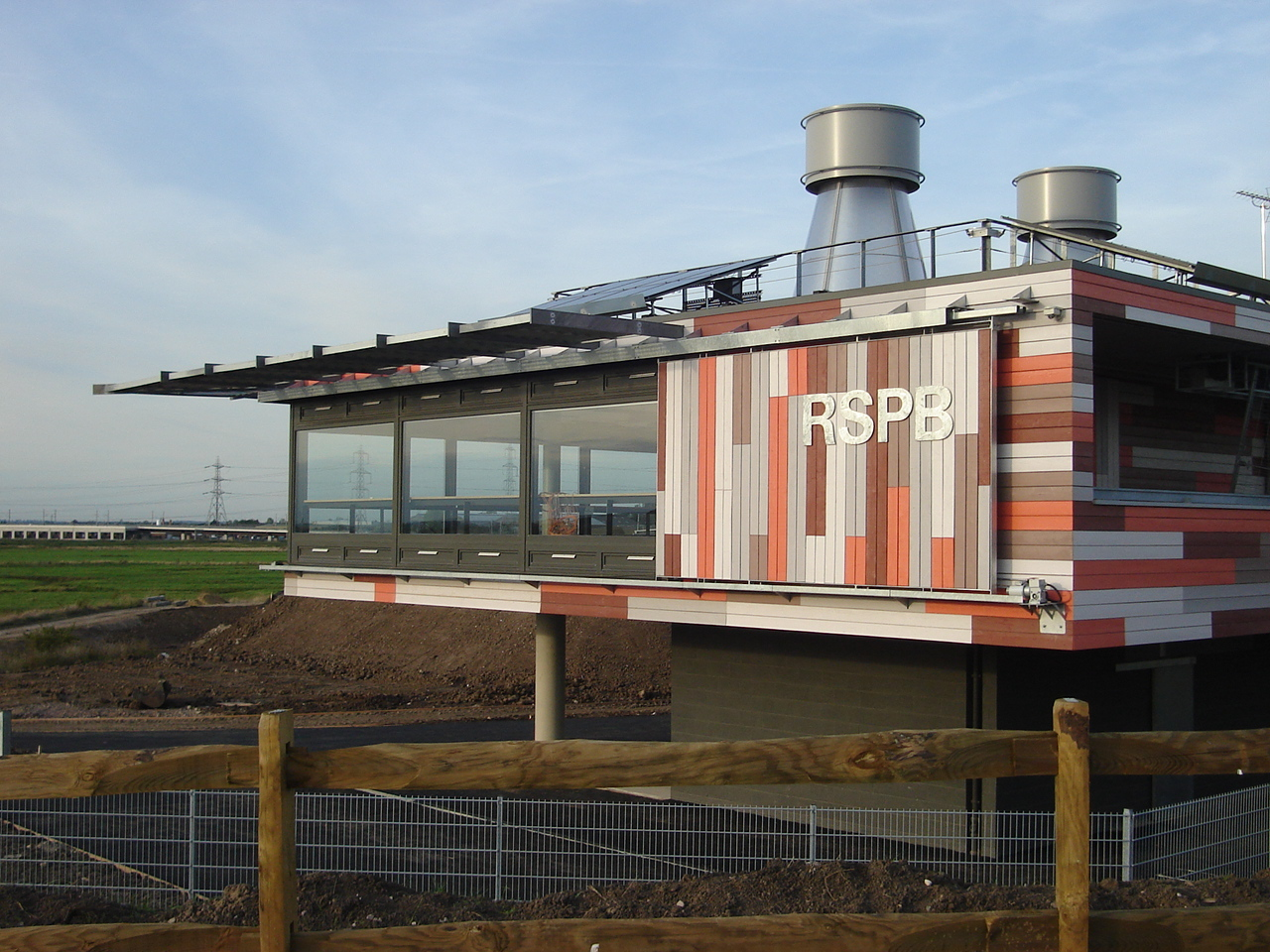
RSPB Environment and Education Centre, Rainham Marshes

Rainham Marshes is an RSPB nature reserve in the east of London, adjacent to the Thames Estuary in Purfleet, Thurrock and the London Borough of Havering.

== History ==
Before the site was protected as a nature reserve, it was considered as a candidate location for a Universal theme park in the 1990s, but a site in Paris was eventually chosen. This project failed to materialize.

In 2000, the area of land was bought from the Ministry of Defence, who used it as a test firing range. With no activity for several years, the nature reserve was officially opened to the public in 2006. It has maintained much of its medieval landscape, and is the largest area of wetland on the upper parts of the Thames Estuary.

== The reserve ==
The reserve is home to a diverse range of bird species, wetland plants and insects. It also has one of the densest water vole populations in the country. In December 2005, the site was visited by a sociable lapwing; over 1,700 people visited the reserve to see this bird. Late in the bird's stay, four penduline tits were also found at the site. Entrance to the site is free to all, though parking fees apply to non-members.

The site is home to an environmentally friendly visitor centre which features solar panels, rainwater harvesting, natural light and ventilation and a ground heat exchange system. This visitor centre, completed in 2006 at a cost £2 million, was designed by van Heyningen and Haward Architects. The building won six awards for its BREEAM sustainable design, including a Green Apple Award, Regeneration and Renewal Award and a Royal Institute of British Architects National Award. As of July 2025, future operations of the visitor centre are under review.

The site is part (77% according to a BBC article) of a Site of Special Scientific Interest (SSSI) called Inner Thames Marshes, and the part which is in the London Borough of Havering has been designated by the council as a Site of Metropolitan Importance for Nature Conservation called Wennington, Aveley and Rainham Marshes. The area west of a drain running south from Brookway is a Local Nature Reserve (LNR), as well as being part of the SSSI. South of the A13 road, the LNR is part of the RSPB reserve, while the northern part is managed by Havering Council.

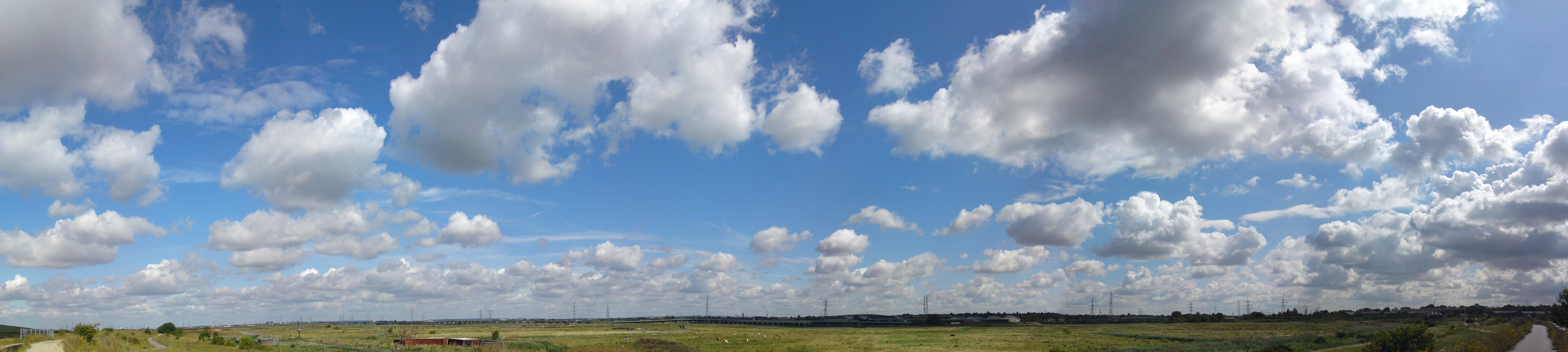
Panorama of the RSPB Rainham Marshes reserve looking north from the Thames path.

== Landfill ==
The marshes to the west of the nature reserve have been used as a landfill site for rubbish from London and the local area. Rainham Landfill is operated by Veolia ES Landfill Limited. The site occupies an area of 177 hectares, and accepts up to 1,500,000 tonnes per year. This includes up to 70,000 tonnes per year in a materials recovery facility and 70,000 tonnes per year of Green Waste. There are facilities for soil washing and a leachate treatment plant. The decomposition of organic matter within the landfill generates a gas containing up to about 50 percent methane. This landfill gas is collected by a network of pipes and since 2001 has been used in an onsite power station. The station is owned and operated by EDL. The plant comprises eight 1.25 MW, three 1.4 MW, two 1.1 MW and one 1.0 MW reciprocating engines which drive electricity generating sets. The electricity produced is fed into the National Grid. The station has a generating capacity of 17.8 MW and typically generates 95 GWh of electricity per year. This is equivalent to powering 14,600 homes. The site is expected to produce landfill gas for electricity generation to beyond 2030.

== See also ==
- List of Sites of Special Scientific Interest in Greater London
- List of Sites of Special Scientific Interest in Essex
- Havering parks and open spaces
