= Langley =

Langley may refer to:

== People ==
- Langley (surname), a common English surname, including a list of notable people with the name
- Dawn Langley Simmons (1922–2000), English author and biographer
- Langley Wakeman Collyer (1885–1947), one of the Collyer brothers
- Langley Fox (born 1989), American illustrator and model
- Lang Hancock (1909–1992) Australian iron ore magnate
- Langley Kirkwood (born 1973), South African actor and triathlete
- Langley Frank Willard Smith (1897–1917) Canadian flying ace

== Places ==
=== Australia ===
- Langley, Victoria

=== Canada ===
- Langley, British Columbia (district municipality), or Township of Langley, a district municipality in the Lower Mainland of British Columbia
  - Fort Langley, a community in the Township of Langley, historically referred to simply as "Langley"
- Langley, British Columbia (city), or City of Langley, is a separately incorporated urban municipality encompassed by the Township of Langley
- Langley (federal electoral district), a Canadian federal electoral district in British Columbia
- Langley (provincial electoral district), a provincial electoral district centred on Langley, British Columbia

=== France ===
- Langley, Vosges

=== United Kingdom ===
- Langley, Berkshire, also known as Langley Marish, formerly in Buckinghamshire
- Langley, Cheshire
- Langley, Derbyshire
- Langley, Yarnscombe, Devon, former seat of the Pollard family
- Langley, Essex also known as Langley Upper Green and Langley Lower Green
- Langley, Gloucestershire, a location
- Langley, Greater Manchester, an area of Middleton
- Langley, Hampshire
- Langley, Hertfordshire
- Langley, Kent
- Langley, Norfolk
- Langley, Northumberland
  - Langley Castle
- Langley, Oxfordshire
- Langley, Shropshire
  - Langley Chapel
- Langley, Somerset, a location
- Langley, Surrey, a location
- Langley, Warwickshire
- Langley, West Midlands, a location
- Langley, West Sussex
- Langley Burrell, Wiltshire

=== United States ===
- Langley, Arkansas
- Langley, Kansas
- Langley, Kentucky
- Langley, Oklahoma
- Langley, Virginia
  - George Bush Center for Intelligence, or simply "Langley", the Central Intelligence Agency headquarters
- Langley Air Force Base, Hampton, Virginia
- Langley Research Center, NASA Langley, Hampton, Virginia
- Langley, Washington
- Mount Langley, California

== Schools ==
- Langley Academy, Slough, Berkshire, England
- Langley College, fictional school in the American sitcom The Facts of Life
- Langley High School (disambiguation), several schools
- Langley School (disambiguation), several schools

== Other uses ==
- Langley (constructor), a former racing car constructor
- Langley (crater), a lunar crater
- Langley (unit), a unit of measurement of solar radiation
- USS Langley, several ships of the United States Navy
- RFA Fort Langley (A230), a stores ship

== See also ==
- Kington Langley, Wiltshire, England, a village
- Langley Green (disambiguation)
- Langley Hall (disambiguation)
- Langley Island (disambiguation)
- Langley Mill (disambiguation)
- Langley Park (disambiguation)
- Langley Speedway (disambiguation)
- Langley Wood (disambiguation)
