= Langley Wood =

Langley Wood may refer to the following places in England:

- Langley Wood; a wood that is part of the Brent Eleigh Woods, an SSSI in Suffolk
- Langley Wood, Cambridgeshire; an SSSI
- Langley Wood, Edwardstone; a wood in the parish of Edwardstone in Suffolk
- Langley Wood, Wiltshire; part of Langley Wood and Homan's Copse, an SSSI
- Langleywood School, Berkshire
- Langley Vale Wood, Surrey

== See also ==
- Langley (disambiguation)
