= Towers Cinema =

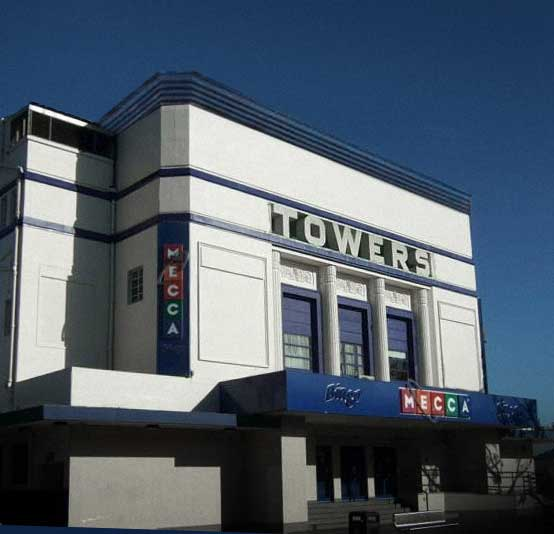
- Towers Cinema Hornchurch, as Mecca Bingo

- Location within Greater London

General information
- Type: Former cinema
- Architectural style: Art Deco/Streamline Moderne
- Location: 31 High Street, Hornchurch, RM11 1TP, Hornchurch, Greater London, United Kingdom
- Coordinates: 51.5633485°N 0.2145259°E
- Completed: 1935
- Opened: 3 August 1935
- Closed: 6 October 1973 (In use as a bingo hall 1973–2015)
- Demolished: April 2017

Design and construction
- Architects: Leslie Hagger Kemp & Frederick Edward Tasker
- Architecture firm: Kemp & Tasker
- Other designers: Interior design by Clark & Fenn

Towers Cinema was a former cinema in Hornchurch, England. It was built in 1935 on part of the former Grey Towers estate and was noted for its Art Deco style of architecture. From 1973 it was used as a bingo hall until it closed in 2015. Despite the efforts of a local campaign to preserve the structure and to have it listed by Historic England, the building was demolished to make way for a Lidl supermarket.

== History ==
The Towers Cinema was built on part of the former Grey Towers estate, a stately home which was demolished in 1931. During World War I, the estate had been requisitioned by the Army Council for use as a military hospital and army camp. A new cinema, named The Towers after the old mansion house, was built on the southern boundary of the Grey Towers estate, at the west end of Hornchurch High Street.

The cinema was commissioned by David J. James, a brewing industrialist turned cinema impresario, for his D.J. James Cinema Circuit. It was designed by Leslie Hagger Kemp (1899–1997) and Frederick Edward Tasker, of the Kemp & Tasker partnership, which designed new and renovated existing cinemas for James' independent chain. Opening its doors on 3 August 1935, it provided facilities including an auditorium to seat 1799 patrons; a shallow stage with dressing rooms; a café-ballroom on the first floor that could seat 200; a cosmetics saloon for use by ladies; and an ample car park. The ornate interior of the cinema, including the auditorium, was designed by the firm Clark & Fenn. The opening programme was a double-bill screening of The Phantom Light starring Binnie Hale and Vagabond Lady starring Robert Young.

In March 1937 James sold his chain of cinemas for a considerable sum to Eastern Cinemas (GCF) Ltd which were then taken over by the Odeon chain in 1943. The characteristic neon ODEON signage was then applied covering the word Towers (which is cut into the fabric of the building but later restored in 2010).

The cinema closed on 6 October 1973, with a screening of the James Bond film Live and Let Die as the final show. The building was converted into a Top Rank bingo hall (later Mecca Bingo) later in 1973, and it remained in use as a bingo hall until the facility closed in 2015.

== Architecture ==
When the cinema was converted into a bingo hall, many alterations to the foyer and lower auditorium were made. The café-ballroom was divided into smaller offices by the installation of dividing walls and a false ceiling which covered a highly ornate coffered ceiling. Many other original features still remained, including the wall and ceiling decoration and the private boxes in the main auditorium.

The architects' firm Kemp & Tasker designed a number of Art Deco cinemas in the south of England, among them the Odeon Cinemas in Romford and Stepney. Their Odeon Cinema building in St Albans, Hertfordshire was restored and re-opened in 2015. Leslie Hagger Kemp designed the former Union Cinema in Dunstable, Bedfordshire, built in 1936–37 which has achieved Grade II listed status; he was associated with the Regal in Camberwell built in 1938–39 also listed at Grade II. Apart from cinemas, Kemp and Tasker won the Daily Mail 'Ideal House' competition in 1934 (at the same time they were working on The Towers Building).

== Preservation campaign ==
The building was sold in 2015 to the retail chain Lidl and was to be demolished to be replaced by a supermarket. Following a campaign to save the building, Havering London Borough Council temporarily protected it in 2015 so Historic England could assess its heritage value. Demolition was opposed by the heritage charity, the Twentieth Century Society.

An approach was made by the Everyman Cinemas chain to purchase the building, but submitted their offer too late. In August 2016, Havering Council approved the scheme to demolish the Towers Cinema, and Lidl announced a plan to retain the “Towers” concrete lettering and to create a public art installation at street level.

== Demolition ==
The former Towers Cinema building was demolished in April 2017 to permit construction of a new supermarket on the site. The Hornchurch branch of Lidl opened for trade on 15 March 2018.

== See also ==
- Grade I and II* listed buildings in Havering
- The Rex, Berkhamsted
- George Cinema, Portobello
