= Langley Park =

Langley Park may refer to places in:

== Australia ==
- Langley Park, Perth, an open space in the central business district of Perth

== England ==
- Langley Park, Buckinghamshire, England, a stately home built by Stiff Leadbetter (c.1705–1766)
- Langley Park, County Durham, England, a village
- Langley Park Estate, an historic country house estate south of Beckenham, Kent, England
- Langley Park, Norfolk, England, a country house now Langley School

== United States ==
- Langley Park, Maryland, United States, an unincorporated area and census-designated place
  - Langley Park (Langley Park, Maryland), an estate listed on the National Register of Historic Places

== See also ==
- Park Langley, a suburb of Beckenham, London, developed on Langley Park Estate
- Langley (disambiguation)
