= Langley School =

Langley School may refer to:

- Langley School, Loddon, Norfolk, England
- Langley School, Solihull, West Midlands, England
- Langley Grammar School, Berkshire, England
- Langley Secondary School, British Columbia, Canada

== See also ==
- Langley (disambiguation)
- Langley Academy, Slough, Berkshire, UK
- Langley High School (disambiguation)
- School District 35 Langley, British Columbia, Canada
  - The Langley Schools Music Project, a recording project involving students from the district
