= Ideal House Competition =

London house exposition

The Ideal House Competition was run for many years as part of the Ideal Home Show.

Every year designs were invited and the winning schemes would be constructed at Olympia, London, for the Ideal Home Show the following year. The houses were often the product of progressive builders who were keen to secure sales of their houses. As a result, many of the Ideal Homes temporarily exhibited at Olympia were subsequently permanently built across the Country. Examples include:

- 1927 Modest two storey red brick house by Gordon Allen. Subsequently erected by the Universal Housing Co Ltd Rickmansworth, Herts.
- 1934 This flat roofed, white walled modernist house sported a tall staircase window, curved corner bay windows, a balcony and a roof terrace. Erected at 63 Casleton Boulevard, Skegness. This house has, unfortunately, been heavily altered with extensions, pitched roof and replacement windows.

== Winning Schemes ==
- 1911 By Reginald C Fry. This was subsequently erected at 2 Whitecroft Way, Park Langley, Beckenham
- 1947 This was subsequently erected in Glemsford, Suffolk, where it was known as 'Sun-Ray House'.
- 1934 By Leslie Kemp and Tasker. Three were subsequently erected, two in London (one at 10 Dorchester Drive), and one in Dublin.
- 1965 By Edward Drewery. This steel house was dismantled re-erected at London Biggin Hill Airport

== House of the Future ==
A more innovative aspect of the Ideal Home Show was the House of the Future which ran through the 1930s and in 1956. These proposals tended to predict future house styles and technologies not yet available.

- 1928 by S Rowland Pierce and R A Duncan
- 1956 by Alison and Peter Smithson
