= 10 Dorchester Drive =

Grade II listed house in south London, England

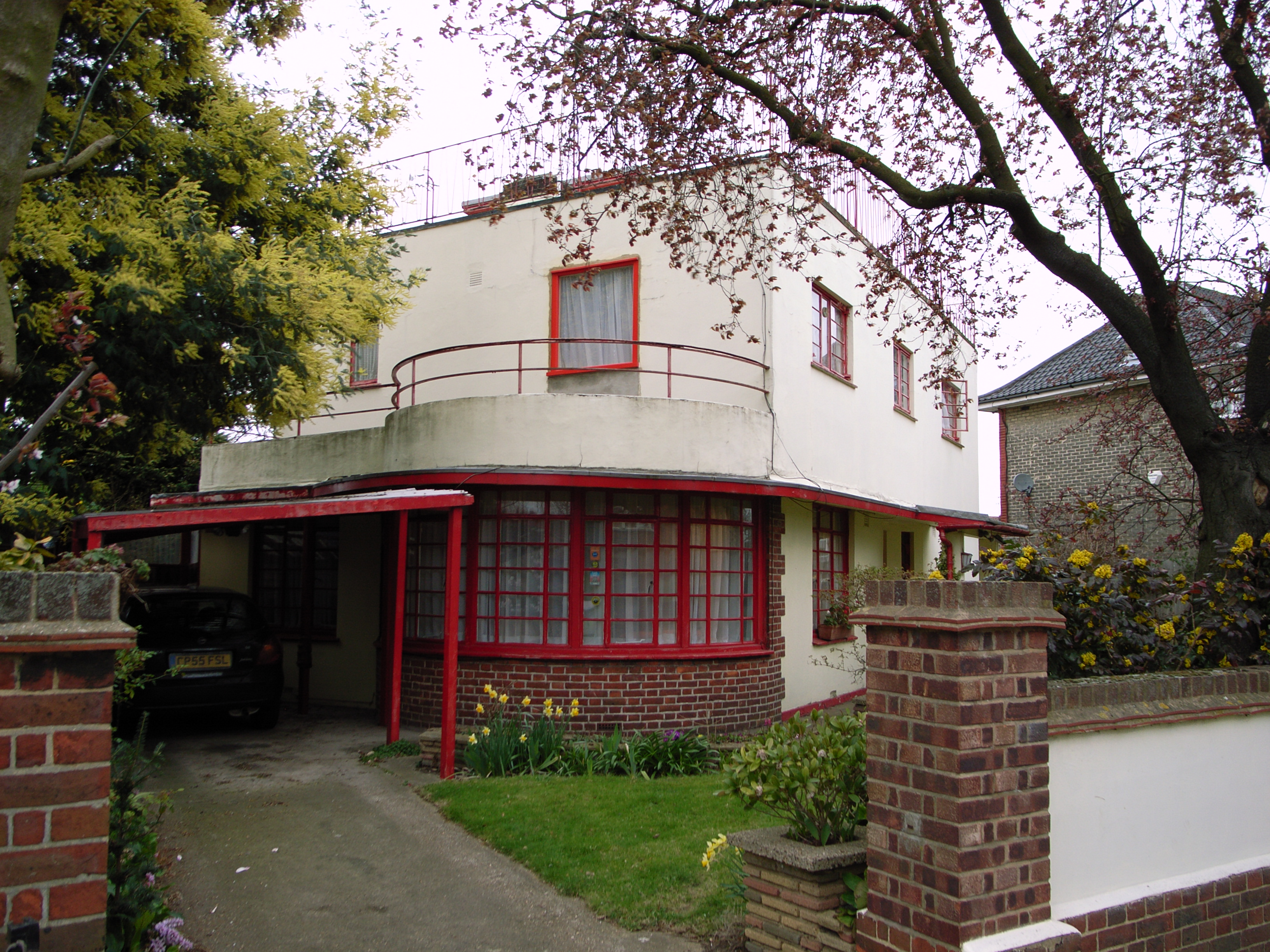
- The house in 2008
- Interactive map of the 10 Dorchester Drive area

General information
- Type: House
- Architectural style: Modernist, art deco
- Location: Herne Hill, London, England
- Coordinates: 51.458577°N 0.097780°W
- Construction started: 1935
- Completed: 1936

Technical details
- Floor count: 2

Design and construction
- Architect: Leslie H. Kemp and Frederick E. Tasker
- Designations: Building Preservation Notice (from February 2022), Grade II listed (from June 2022)

10 Dorchester Drive is a 1935 art deco style house in Herne Hill, south London, England. It was designed by Kemp & Tasker and the builders were Messrs Morrell of Bromley. In February 2022, an emergency Building Preservation Notice was put in place, as the building was threatened with imminent demolition; in June of the same year, it was Grade II listed.

== Background ==
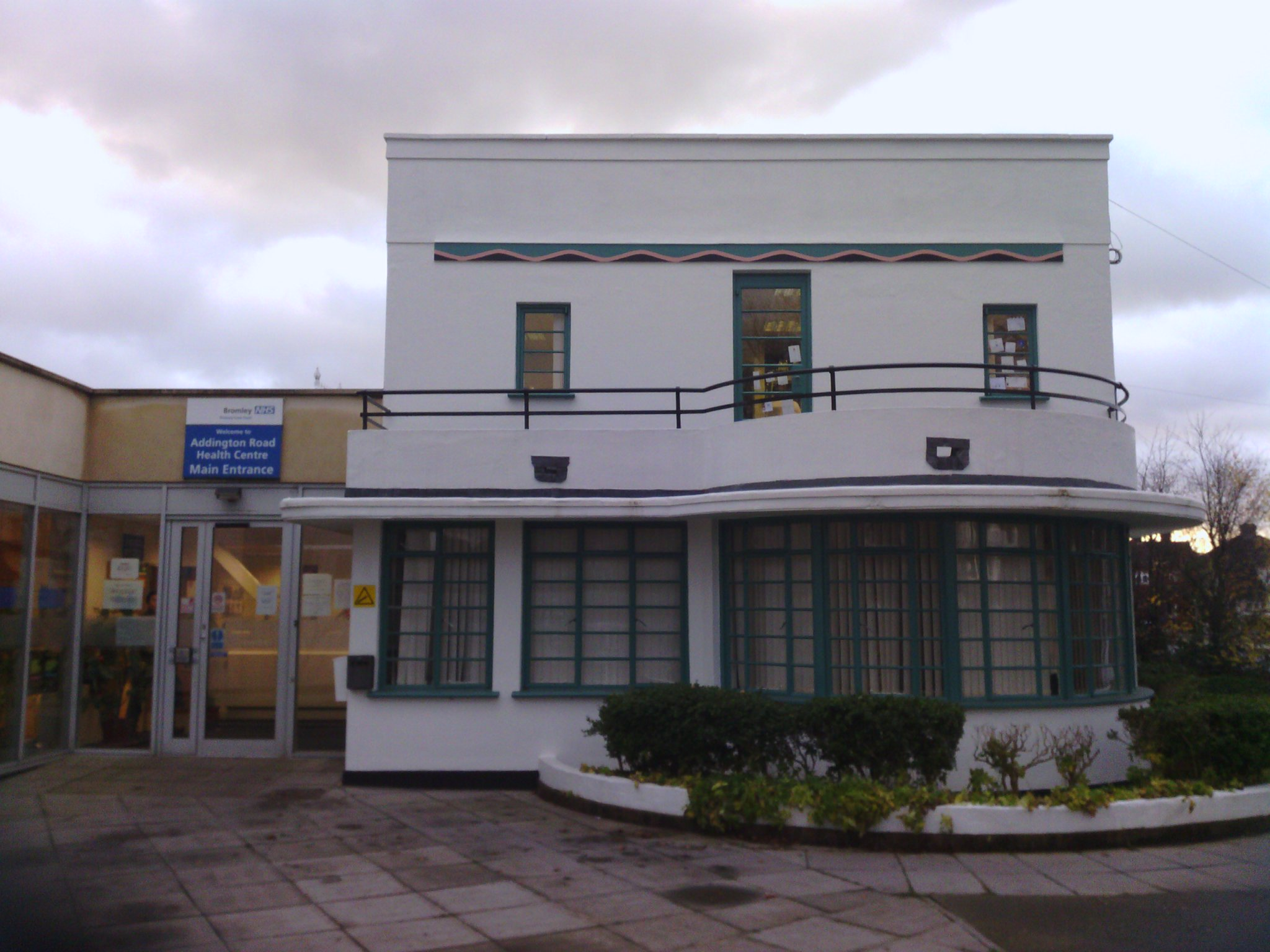
Addington Road Health Centre, West Wickham, was developed from a house built to the same design as 10 Dorchester Drive

In 1934, Leslie H. Kemp and Frederick E. Tasker won the Ideal House Competition to design a home for the Daily Mail's Ideal Home Exhibition. Their design used the moderne branch of the art deco style that was then in vogue. A mock-up "show home" was constructed for the 1935 exhibition, at Olympia London, in a display called "Village of Tomorrow".

One feature of the design was that the two downstairs reception rooms could be combined with the hallway, to feature as a ballroom.

== The house ==
The five-bedroom house on Dorchester Drive, constructed in 1935–1936 by the speculative builders and twin brothers Cyril and Stanley Morrell (born 1908), (Note: A copy of the Morrells' brochure advertising the project is held by the Local Studies Library, Bromley, Kent) is one of only three examples of the design built. (Note: The others being at 77 Addington Road, West Wickham (much modified as a health centre, but nonetheless Grade II listed in 2021; co-ordinates: 51.369951°N 0.002496°W); and Stanstead, Mount Merrion, Dublin (co-ordinates: 53.297489°N 6.211570°W)) The building was constructed with its plan at an angle to the street, rather than the more usual parallel alignment. It retains several of its original features, including the bathroom fittings, iron staircase, Crittall windows and a roof terrace.

== Legal protection ==
The house was placed on the market in September 2021, having been owned by one family for 60 years. Once it was sold, noting the attractiveness of its site to property developers and consequently the likely threat of its demolition, the Twentieth Century Society, the Herne Hill Society, and several individuals campaigned for its preservation. On 24 February 2022, Lambeth Council issued a Building Preservation Notice, preventing alteration or demolition, on pain of criminal prosecution. The order would have remained in effect for six months but, in June 2022, the house was Grade II listed, giving it permanent protection.

== Residents ==
The house was the home of psychologist Hans Eysenck from 1960 until his death in 1997; it remained occupied by his widow Sybil until she died in 2020.
