= Reginald Fry =

English architect

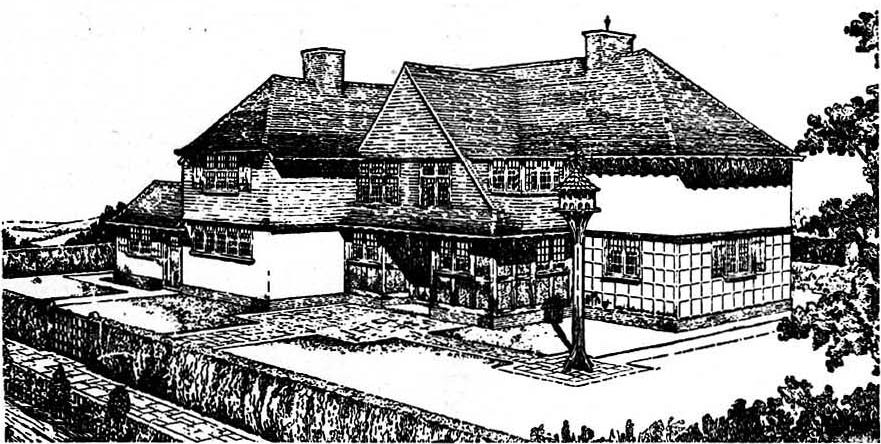
1912 drawing of the Olympia model house

Reginald C. Fry (1878–1932) was an English architect.

Fry's largest body of work can be found at Park Langley, Beckenham where he was supervising architect for the laying out of the estate and designer of many of the houses.

His most memorable house on the estate is 2 Whitecroft Way the design for which won the Ideal House Competition in 1911 and was erected at Olympia in the Ideal Home Show of 1912.

He also designed the Boyne Road Development in Lewisham which is now in a conservation area for the Daily Mail home of the year competition for 1912.
