= PSAT =

PSAT may refer to:

- PSAT/NMSQT, a standardized test in the United States
- Phosphoserine transaminase, an enzyme
- Palm Springs Aerial Tramway
- Pop-up satellite archival tag
- The problem of Probabilistic Satisfiability in Probabilistic logic
- ParkinsonSAT, a technology demonstration and amateur radio satellite
