= Kemp & Tasker =

English architects

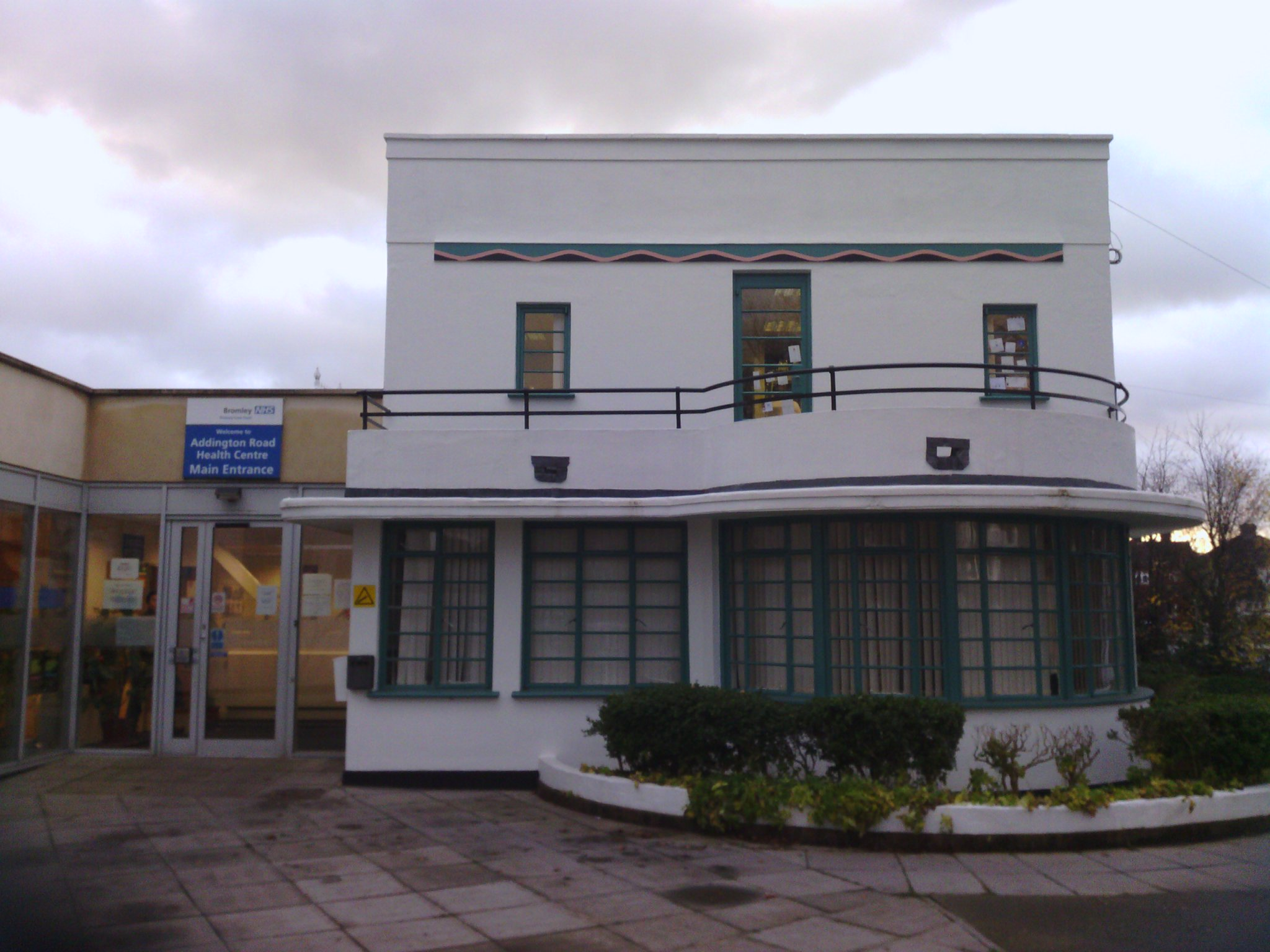
Addington Road Health Centre, Addington Road in West Wickham, built by Kemp & Tasker

Leslie H. Kemp and Frederick E. Tasker were English architects who practiced in the 1930s as Kemp & Tasker.

They are best known for their cinemas, although they are responsible for a number of notable buildings in South London and Kent for a Messrs Morrell Bros. Builders of 60 High Street, Bromley, Kent. These include:

- Motor Showrooms, Garage and Restaurant, 38 - 40 Croydon Road, Coney Hall, Hayes, Kent
- Dorchester Court flats, Herne Hill, London
- 5 Dorchester Drive, Herne Hill, London
- Crownleigh Court, Crownstone Road, Brixton, London
- Tudor Stacks, Dorchester Drive, Herne Hill, London (demolished)

In 1934 a Kemp and Tasker house design won the Daily Mail's Ideal House Competition and was erected temporarily at Olympia in the 'Village of Tomorrow' at Ideal Home Show the following year. Morrell's glossy brochure advertised that it could be built to order anywhere and three known examples exist:

- 77 Addington Road, West Wickham (much modified as a health centre, but nonetheless Grade II listed in 2021) (Note: 77 Addington Road coordinates: 51.369951°N 0.002496°W)
- 10 Dorchester Drive, Herne Hill, London (Note: 10 Dorchester Drive coordinates: 51.458577°N 0.097780°W) It was granted grade II listed building protection in 2022.
- Stanstead, Mount Merrion, Dublin, Ireland (1936) (Note: Stanstead coordinates: 53.297489°N 6.211570°W)

== Cinemas ==
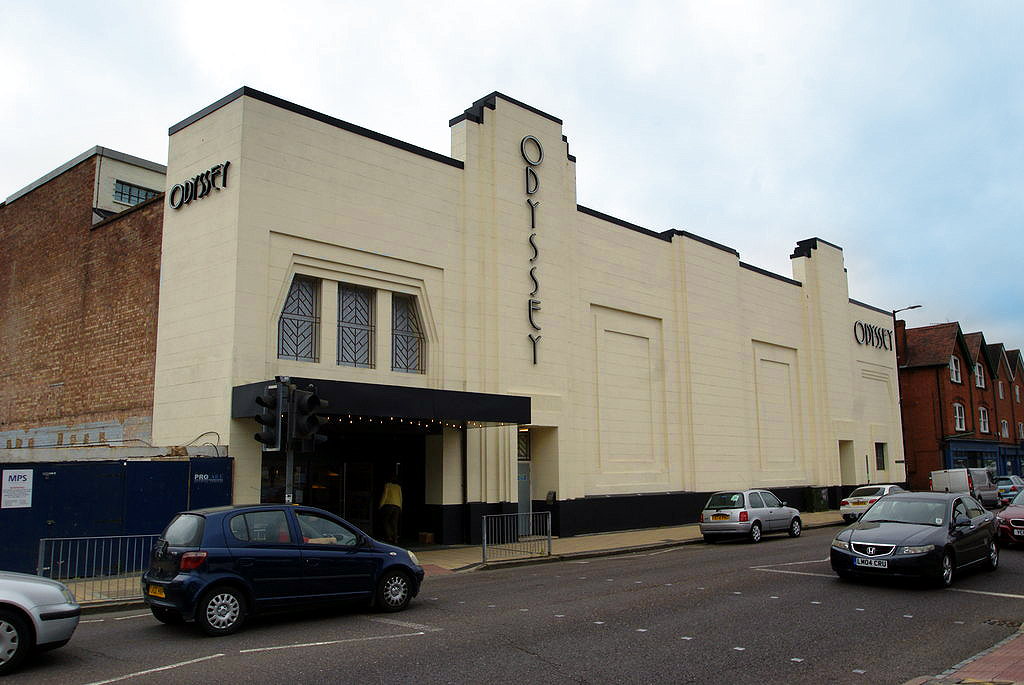
The Odeon, St Albans (re-opened as the Odyssey, 2015)

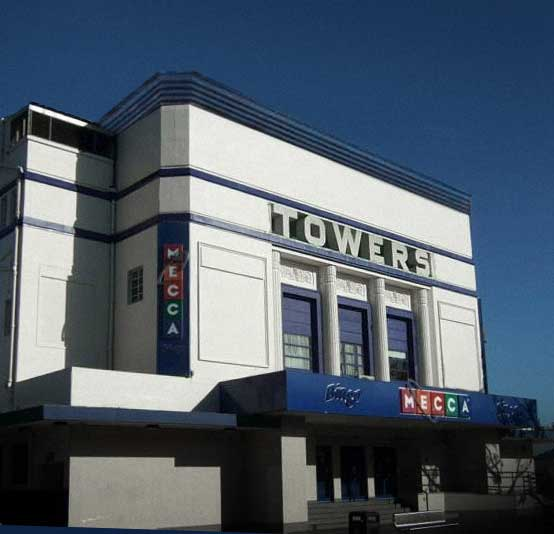
Towers Cinema Hornchurch (demolished 2017)

- 1932 Regent Cinema, Station Square, Paignton, Devon (demolished)
- 1933 Odeon Cinema, Whalebone Lane, Chadwell Heath, Essex (demolished)
- 1934 Ritz Cinema, Gordon Street, Luton
- 1935 Embassy Cinema, Braintree, Essex
- 1936 Regent Cinema, Hatfield, Hertfordshire
- Towers Cinema (Odeon from 1946), Hornchurch, Essex (demolished)
- 1935 Savoy Cinema, Petersfield, Hants.
- 1936 Ritz Cinema, Belfast, Northern Ireland
- 1940 Regal Cinema (ABC from 1961), Camberwell (closed 1973)
- Commodor Cinema, High Street, Orpington, Kent (demolished)
- Odeon Cinema, Greenwich, London (demolished)
- Odeon Cinema, Romford, Essex
- Odeon Cinema, St. Albans, Hertfordshire (re-opened as the Odyssey, 2015)
- Odeon Cinema, Stepney, London
- Rex Cinema, Wood Green, London
