= Langley Green =

Langley Green is the name of several locations in England:

- Langley Green, West Midlands

- Langley Green railway station

- Langley Green, West Sussex

== See also ==
- Langley (disambiguation)
