= Dominion Cinema =

Independent cinema in Edinburgh, Scotland

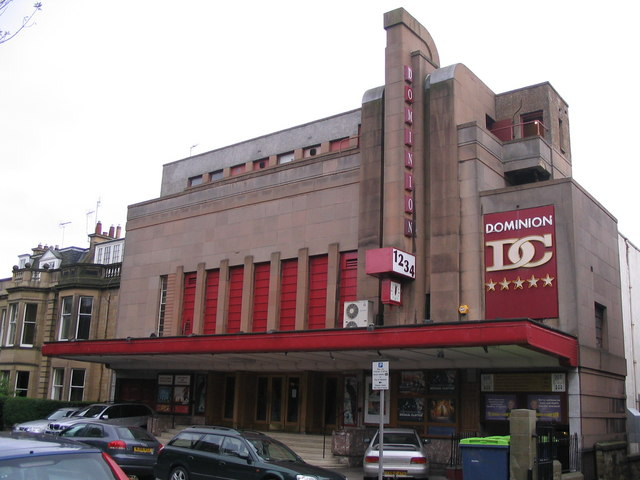
- The Dominion Cinema
- Interactive map of Dominion Cinema
- Address: Newbattle Terrace; Edinburgh; EH10 4RT
- Location: Edinburgh, Scotland, UK
- Coordinates: 55°55′51″N 3°12′31″W
- Owner: Independent
- Seating type: Lounge Seats
- Capacity: 410
- Type: Cinema

Construction
- Built: 1937–1939
- Opened: 1938
- Renovated: 1972, 1980, 1998

Website
- https://www.dominioncinema.co.uk

Listed Building – Category B
- Official name: 18 Newbattle Terrace, Dominion Cinema
- Designated: 30 March 1993
- Reference no.: LB27650

The Dominion Cinema is an independent cinema located in the Morningside area of Edinburgh, Scotland. Designed in the Art Deco style by the architect Thomas Bowhill Gibson, it was opened in 1938. The Dominion is now a Category B listed building.

== History ==
The company was incorporated by William Cameron, on 13 May 1937 when he bought the land in Newbattle Terrace. The cinema was opened on 31 January 1938 originally seating 1300. The first feature film to be screened here was Wee Willie Winkie, starring Shirley Temple.

The cinema, one of only two family-run cinemas in Scotland has only been forced to close twice. Like all British cinemas, it was ordered to be closed at the outbreak of World War II because of fears of air raids but was allowed to re-open shortly afterwards. The second time was in 2020 as a result of the COVID-19 pandemic.

The cinema has had planned closures on three further occasions; in 1972, 1980 and 1998, each time to add more screens. The cinema still runs today as a four-screen venue, and in 1993 it was protected as a category B listed building. It is still run by the Cameron family.

== Architecture ==
The Dominion was designed by the architect Thomas Bowhill Gibson, who also designed the George Cinema, Portobello. The Dominion is noted as a fine example of Art Deco Streamline Moderne style. The exterior is dominated by a tall off-centre tower with a clock and sign board, and the entrance is embellished with glass panels featuring sun-ray devices, Indian plumes and peacocks.

Much of Gibson's original interior decoration survives. The auditorium was split into two screens in 1972, when the original circle was extended fully forward to form Screen 1. In 1980 a third screen added above the foyer.
