= George Cinema, Portobello =

The George Cinema
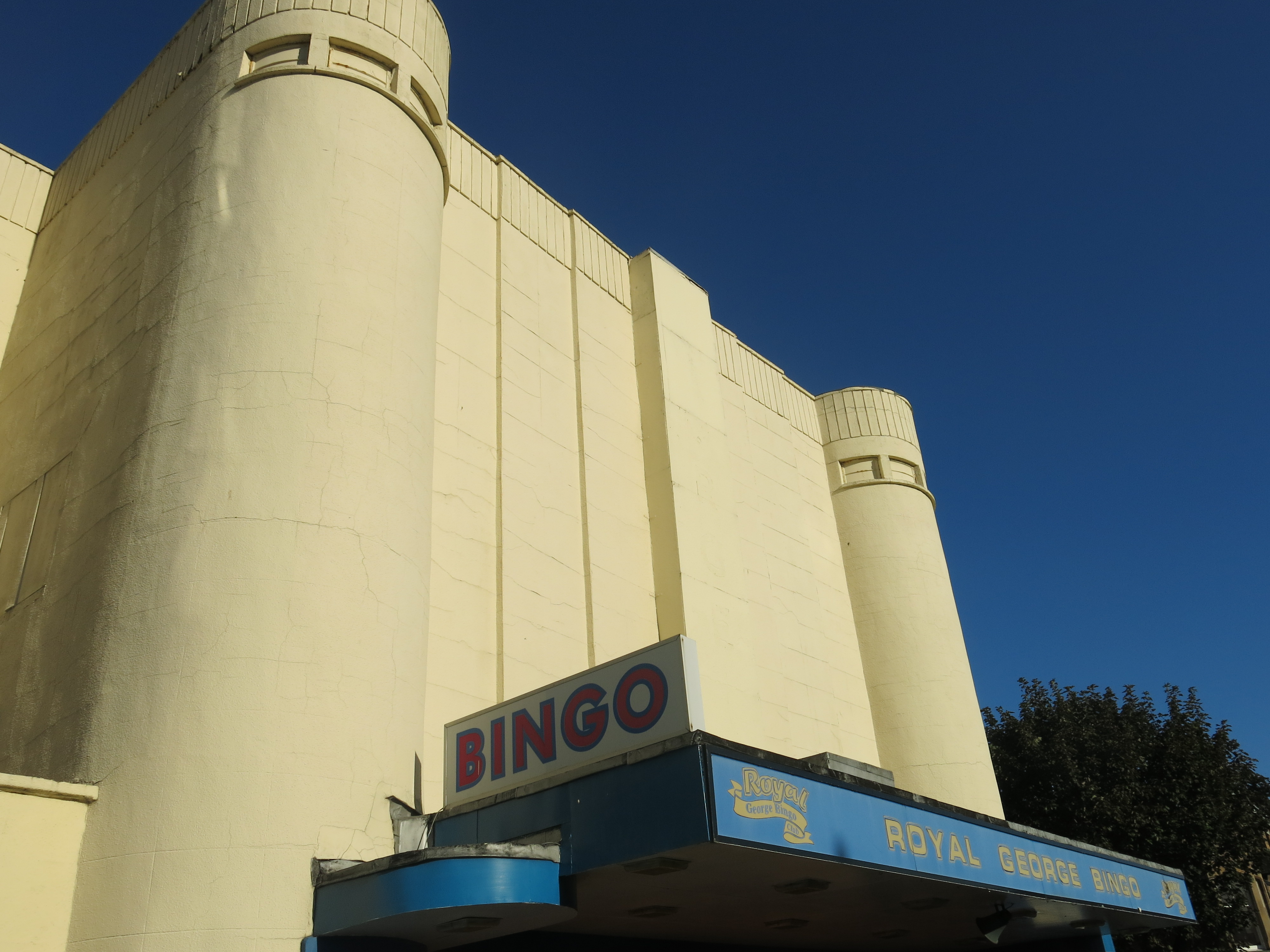
- Exterior view of the George in 2016

- Location within the City of Edinburgh council area
- Former names: The County Cinema

General information
- Type: Former cinema
- Architectural style: Art Deco/Streamline Moderne
- Location: 14 Bath Street; Portobello, Edinburgh; EH15 1EY; Scotland
- Coordinates: 55°57′13″N 3°06′48″W
- Completed: 1939
- Opened: 30 March 1939
- Closed: 1974 (In use as a bingo hall 1974–2016)

Design and construction
- Architect: Thomas Bowhill Gibson
- Designations: Category C listed

The George Cinema is a former Art Deco cinema on Bath Street in Portobello, Edinburgh. The building opened in 1939 as the County Cinema. For many years, a bingo hall, it is a Category C listed building.

== History ==
The cinema was opened as The County Cinema at a grand opening ceremony on Thursday, 30 March 1939, at 2.30 pm, performed by Bailie James Edward. The feature films of the opening programme were Snow White and the Seven Dwarfs and Air Devils.

The cinema building was designed by Thomas Bowhill Gibson, who is also responsible for the Dominion Cinema in Morningside, Edinburgh. The promoters were Messrs Scott Paulo & Company. The cost of the cinema was £20,000 and upon opening it seated 1600 people. The cinema featured a wide knee-room, saucer-shaped layout ensuring no seat is immediately behind another, Western Electric Mirrophonic sound and Holophone lighting system.

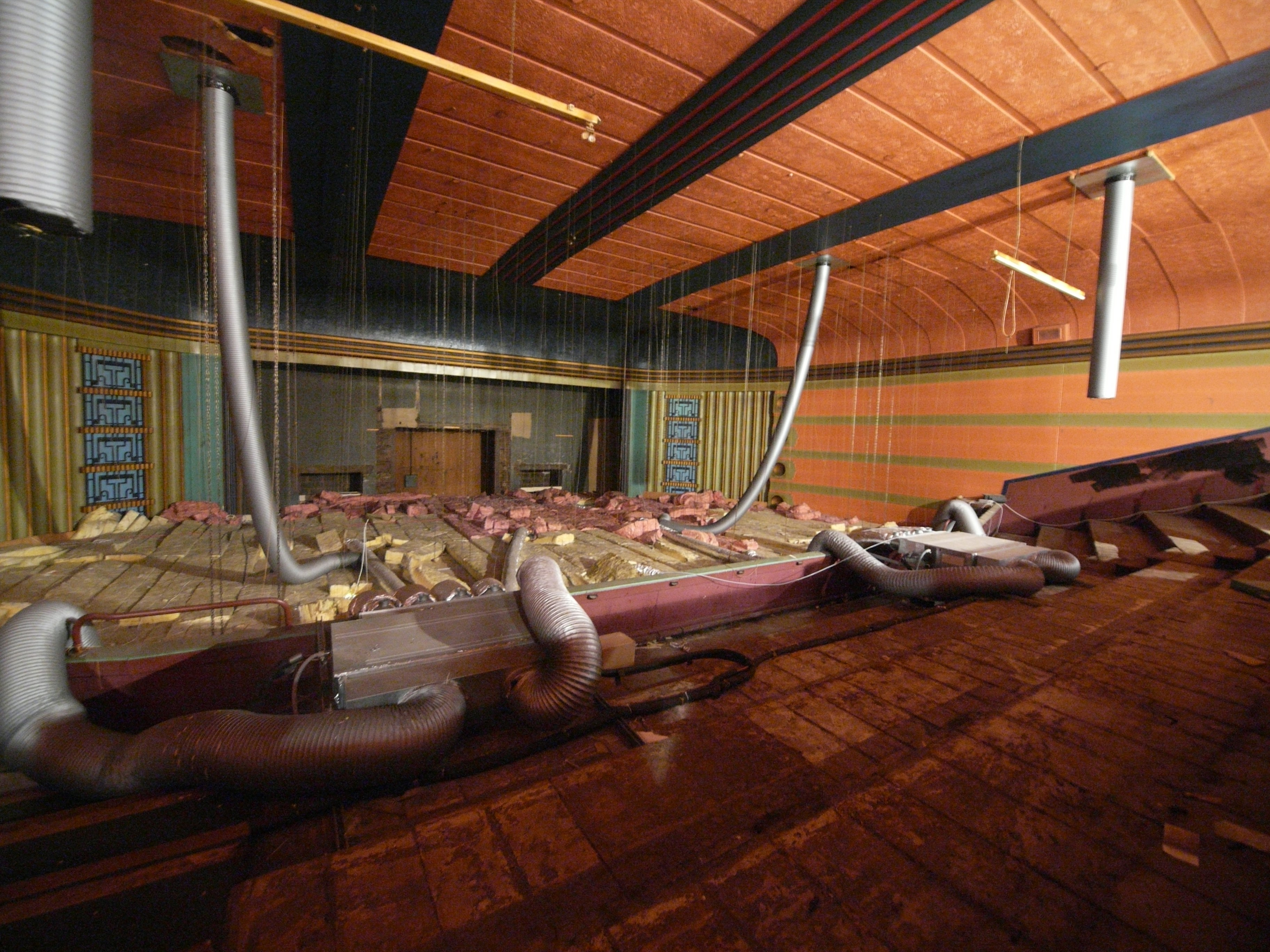
Interior view of the George from the balcony, showing the false ceiling and several original features (2016).

In the 1950s, the cinema was purchased by George Palmer, owner of the Associated G.P. Cinemas circuit, and underwent refurbishment. It was reopened in November 1954 under the new name of The George Cinema (named after its owner), and as part of the Edinburgh International Festival that year, began to screen foreign films. When it reopened, The George was the first cinema in the east of Scotland to use the four-track stereophonic sound with a wide screen. The system required 32 loudspeakers in the cinema, 16 of which were behind the screen.

=== Closure ===
The George Cinema closed in 1974 and underwent alterations to convert it into a bingo hall, which included the replacement of outer cladding and the removal of the central glass brick tower. The bingo hall ceased operation in 2016 and the building was derelict.

The George Cinema was to be demolished under a planning application for 20 privately owned flats. The City of Edinburgh Planning Authority refused consent to demolish the Art Deco cinema. An appeal was lodged in April 2018 by the developer, with an inspection to be made by the Reporter on 13 August 2018. Fresh proposals for redevelopment were submitted in early 2021, involving the demolition of the cinema auditorium and lobby, retention of the façade and reinstatement of the glass tower. Local councillors opposed these new proposals.

A campaign group, Friends of The George, has been established to save the former cinema from demolition and restore it as an operational cinema. In November 2023, an anonymous private benefactor pledged funds to purchase the cinema.

== Architecture ==
Thomas Bowhill Gibson's County Cinema is a noted example of Art Deco architecture and, in particular, the Streamline Moderne style that had become popular in the 1920s for its association with modern transport, sports and leisure. Gibson had been influenced by the geometrical, Modernist building forms that were emerging in France, the Netherlands and Germany. The County Cinema was designed with bold, geometric towers and a smooth, unornamented façade painted in two shades of blue. Inspired by the emerging night architecture style of the 1930s, Gibson also added a central glass brick tower, which was lit internally with coloured lights, exploiting the new possibilities of electric light.

== See also ==
- Architecture in modern Scotland
- The Rex, Berkhamsted
- The Towers Cinema in Hornchurch, London
