= ParkinsonSAT =

U.S. technology demonstration satellite

- Mission type: Communications
- Operator: U.S. Navy
- COSPAR ID: 2015-025D
- SATCAT no.: 40654

Spacecraft properties
- Bus: 1.5U Cubesat
- Manufacturer: Aerospace Co.
- Launch mass: 1.3 kilograms (2.9 lb)
- Dimensions: 10 by 10 by 15 centimetres (3.9 in × 3.9 in × 5.9 in)

Start of mission
- Launch date: 20 May 2015, 15:05 UTC
- Rocket: Atlas V 501 AV-054
- Launch site: Cape Canaveral SLC-41

Orbital parameters
- Reference system: Geocentric
- Regime: Low Earth
- Semi-major axis: 6,822 kilometres (4,239 mi)
- Eccentricity: 0.160974
- Perigee altitude: 341.5 kilometres (212.2 mi)
- Apogee altitude: 561.1 kilometres (348.7 mi)
- Inclination: 54.9919°
- Period: 93.5 minutes
- RAAN: 18.1944°
- Argument of perigee: 119.1910°
- Mean motion: 15.40667422
- Epoch: 26 June 2018

Transponders
- Band: FM

ParkinsonSAT, PSat or Naval Academy OSCAR 84 is a U.S. technology demonstration satellite and an amateur radio satellite for Packet Radio. It was built at the U.S. Naval Academy and was planned as a double satellite (ParkinsonSAT A and B). The name ParkinsonSAT was chosen in honor of Bradford Parkinson, the father of the GPS system. After successful launch, the satellite was assigned the OSCAR number 84.

== Mission ==
The satellite was launched on May 20, 2015, with an Atlas V rocket along with the main payload X-37B OTV-4 and 9 other CubeSat satellites (X-37B OTV-4, GEARRS 2, LightSail A, OptiCube 1, OptiCube 2, OptiCube 3, USS Langley, AeroCube 8A, AeroCube 8B and BRICSat-P) from Cape Canaveral AFS, Florida.

ParkinsonSAT is a student satellite project. It was partly funded by the Aerospace Corporation. It has a transponder for transmitting telemetry from remote measuring points (eg drifting buoys). This telemetry is to be transmitted to a network of ground stations. A second transponder enables multi-user text transmission in PSK31 mode. This transponder was built by the Brno University of Technology.

Originally, the project consisted of 2 identical satellites: PSat-A and PSat-B, 2 identical 1.5U Cubesats, which should be brought together in a 3U starter into space. During the long wait for a launch opportunity in 2014, the construction of the satellite was changed again. The solar cells have been replaced by new, more efficient cells. The other originally named PSat-B CubeSat was rebuilt and started as BRICSat-P.

== Frequencies ==
- 406 MHz Ocean Data Telemetry Microsat Link (ODTML)
- 145.825 MHz APRS Uplink and Downlink (1200 Band AX.25)
- 435.350 MHz PSK31 Downlink (FM, 300 mW)
- 28.120 MHz PSK31 Uplink (SSB, 25 W)

== See also ==
- OSCAR
