= Langley Mill (disambiguation) =

Langley Mill is a town in Derbyshire, England.

Langley Mill may also refer to:

- Langley Mill railway station, the current station in Langley Mill
- Langley Mill railway station (Erewash Valley line), a former station in Langley Mill
- Eastwood and Langley Mill railway station, a former station near Langley Mill

== See also ==
- Langley (disambiguation)
