= Joseph Bernard Clark =

British plasterer

Joseph Bernard Clark (1868–1940) was a British ornamental plasterer and co-founder of the specialist plasterwork company of Clark & Fenn.

Born in Dundee on 25 March 1868, the son of a plasterer, Clark's family moved to London when he was still young. In 1913 Clark joined with Harry Fenn, a surveyor, founding a company at Loughborough Junction to specialise in ornamental fibrous plasterwork and Plaster of Paris work. The business was a rapid success with commissions from the new cinemas and major theatres who competed against each other through the splendour of their interior decoration. For designs, Clark & Fenn worked closely with G. Jackson & Sons, founded in 1780 with Robert Adam as a designer. The company soon moved to larger premises at Clapham Old Town where they were able to prefabricate much of their work off-site. This allowed them to take the mouldings ready-prepared for installation to a theatre or cinema, minimising the disruption to performances and rehearsals.

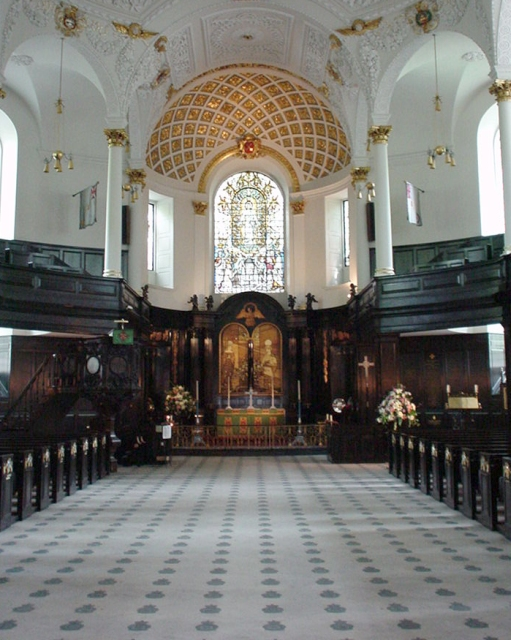
St Clement Danes

Notable works include:

- Theatre Royal, Drury Lane
- Grand Theatre Leeds
- London Palladium
- Somerset House in the Strand
- St. Clement Danes in the Strand,
- Granada, Tooting

== Sources ==
- Friends of West Norwood cemetery Biography of Joseph Bernard Clark (1868–1940) Master Plasterer
