= Langley High School =

Langley High School may refer to:

- Langley High School (Fairfax County, Virginia), United States
- Langley High School, Oldbury, West Midlands, England
- Langley High School (Pittsburgh), Pennsylvania, United States

== See also ==
- Langley School (disambiguation)
- Cardinal Langley Roman Catholic High School, Middleton, Greater Manchester, England
