= Langley Wood and Homan's Copse =

Protected area in Wiltshire, England

Coordinates: 50.9844°N 1.6737°W

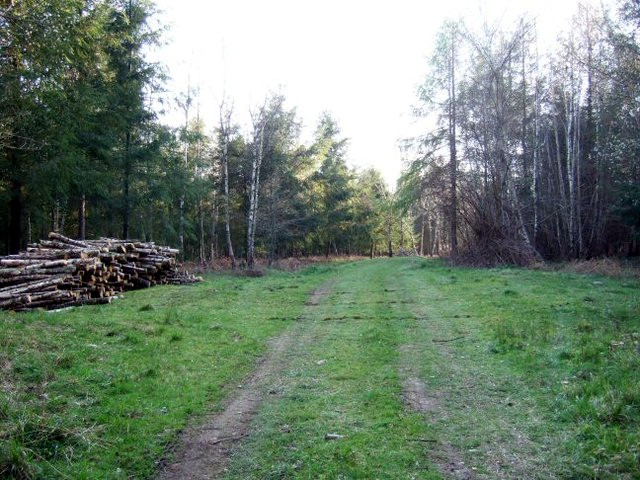
Langley Wood

Langley Wood and Homan's Copse (grid reference SU230206) is a 219.28 hectare biological Site of Special Scientific Interest in Wiltshire, notified in 1985.

== Sources ==
- Natural England citation sheet for the site (accessed 7 April 2022)
