= Park Langley =

Coordinates: 51.385466°N 0.008712°W

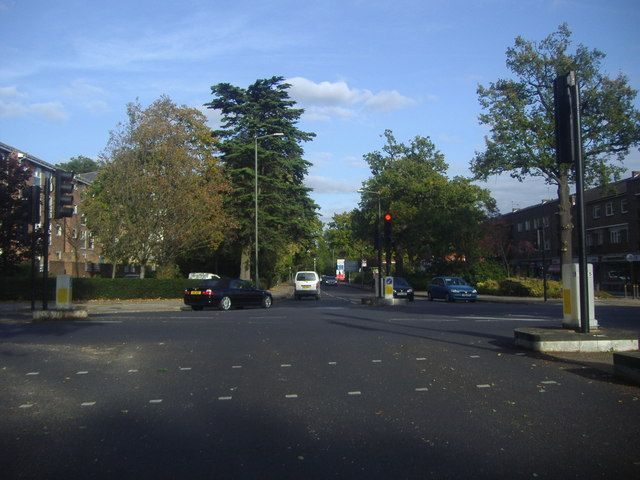
- Westmoreland Road junction, Park Langley

- Location within Greater London
- London borough: Bromley
- Ceremonial county: Greater London
- Region: London
- Country: England
- Sovereign state: United Kingdom
- Post town: BECKENHAM
- Postcode district: BR3
- Dialling code: 020
- Police: Metropolitan
- Fire: London
- Ambulance: London
- UK Parliament: Beckenham and Penge
- London Assembly: Bexley and Bromley

Park Langley is a suburb of south-east London, located in the London Borough of Bromley. Prior to 1965 it was in the historic county of Kent. It borders Shortlands and Beckenham to the north, Bromley to the east, Hayes and West Wickham to the south, and Eden Park to the west.

== History ==
The area can possibly be traced back to 862, with the mention of 'landan league' in a charter, however the first definite reference is found in the 13th century, when the Langley family (or de Langele) family are recorded as owning land in this area. The area, known as Langley Park Estate, passed through various owners over the centuries, ending up in the possession of the Goodhart family in the early 19th century, who later sold it to the Lewisham-based building firm H & G Taylor in 1908.

Modern Park Langley was first developed in the 1900s by H & G Taylor Builders. The initial phase (1909–1913) was laid out under the influence of the garden city movement, with individual houses in a generous sylvan landscape. The layout of the estate and the design of most of the houses was entrusted to Reginald C Fry. Other architects who designed houses for this initial phase were Edgar Underwood, H. T. Bromley, Sothern Dexter, and Durrans & Groves. The first roads to be laid out were Wickham Way, Elwill Way and Hayes Way in 1909, with Malmains Way, Whitecroft Way and Styles Way following in 1910. Around 80 houses were complete by 1914, although by that time H & G Taylor had been succeeded by The London and Kent Estate Ltd. This initial phase of the estate was designated a Conservation Area in 1989. The estate development included a golf club (opened 1910), housed in the old LangleyPark Mansion, and a tennis club. The mansion was destroyed by fire in 1913.

The estates most historically interesting house is 2 Whitecroft Way by Reginald C Fry – the design for which won the Ideal Home competition in 1910 and was erected at Olympia in the Ideal Home Show of 1912. The famous Langley Park Garage (Chinese Garage), built in 1929, adjoins the first phase of the Park Langley suburb but was not part of its development.

Henry Wellcome purchased part of the site in 1918 in order to construct a pharmaceutical testing laboratory. This site was closed in 1995 and later developed for housing. The area remains a wealthy one, and contains gated communities such as Langley Park and Langley Waterside. It is primarily residential, with small rows of shops located on the edge of the area on Wickham Road and Westmoreland Road.

In August 2012, Bromley Council granted planning permission for Langley Court, Beckenham|Langley Court, a £150 million regeneration scheme in Beckenham by the developers Altessen (a joint venture between Altyon and Essential Land).

Park Langley has a committee called the PLRA.

== Transport ==
London Buses routes 162, 352, 358 and night route N3 serve the area.

== Sport & Leisure ==
Old Dunstonians Sports Club, owns the sports ground in St Dunstan's Lane, Langley Park. Founded in 1922 it hosts two sports clubs: Old Dunstonian RFC (founded 1903) for competitive rugby union and OD Cuaco CC (founded 2003) for competitive cricket, with tenant sports clubs providing tennis, archery and football. Beccehamians RFC a Rugby Union Club founded in 1933 plays competitive rugby at the bottom of Corkscrew Hill. Langley Park Golf Club established in 1910 is located in Barnfield Wood Road and has hosted British Open Qualification rounds www.langleyparkgolf.co.uk

Club Langley is a football and sports club in the area.

== Gallery ==
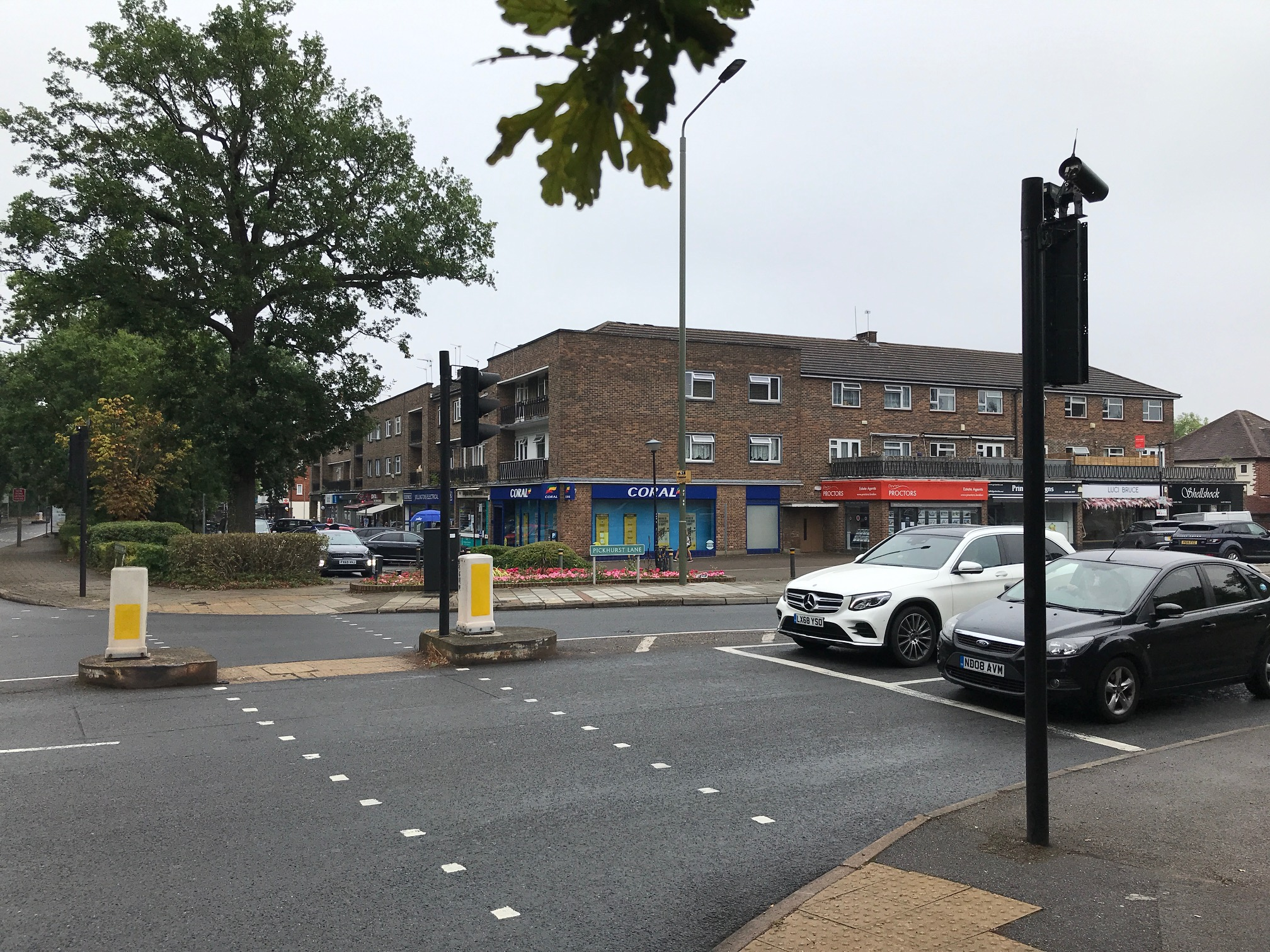
Shops on Westmoreland Road

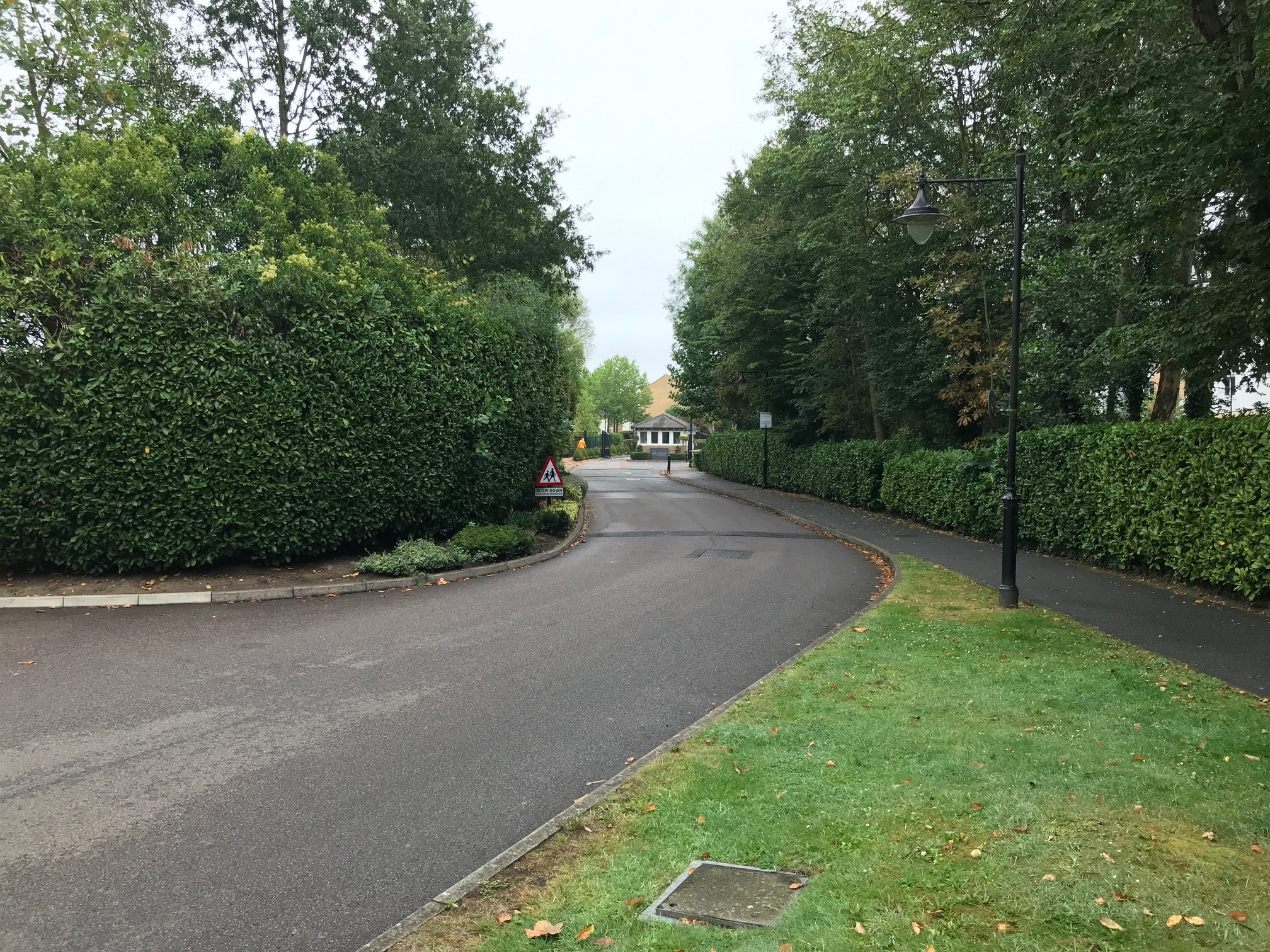
Entrance to the Langley Waterside gated community

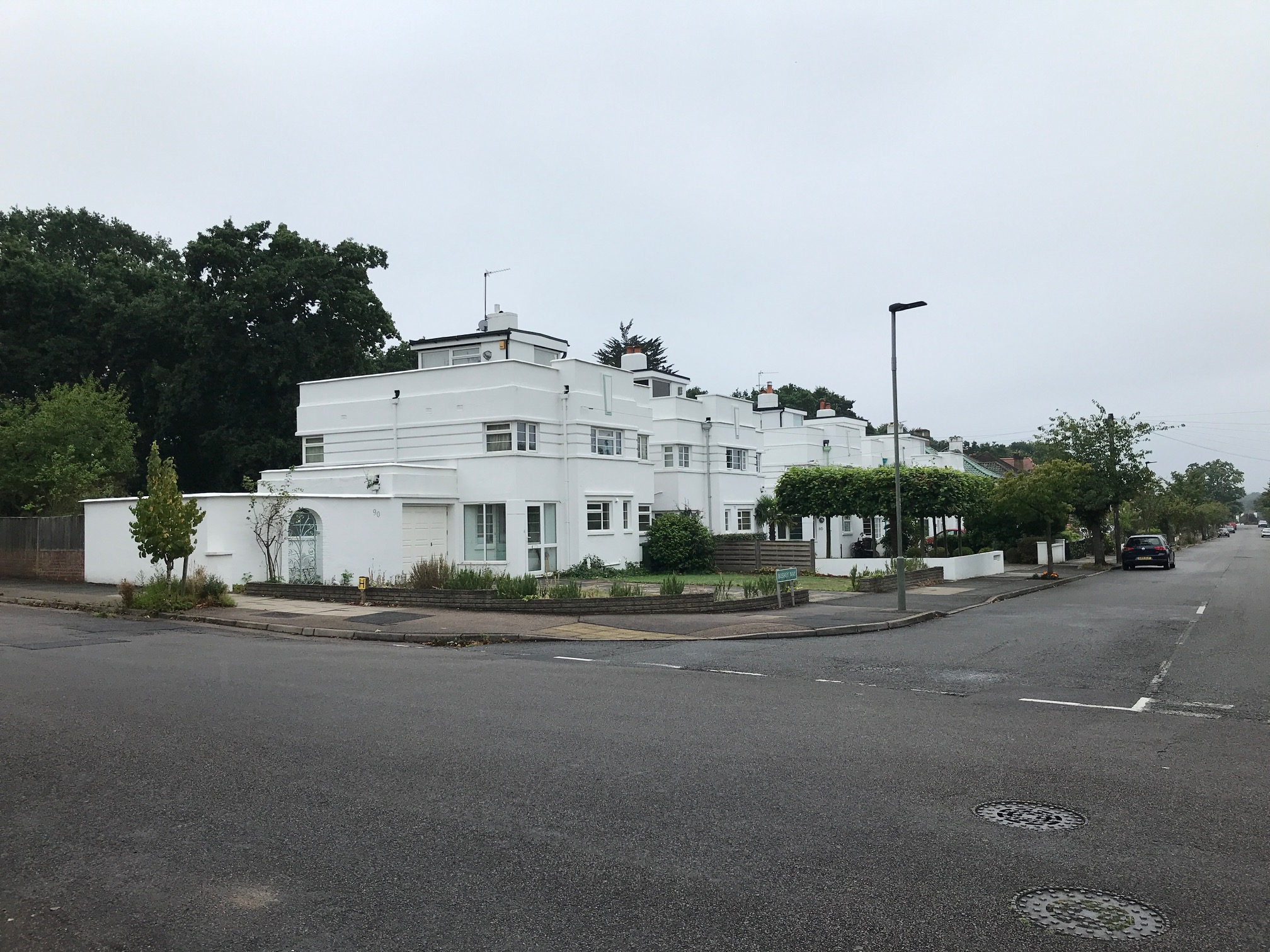
Chart House, Bushey Way

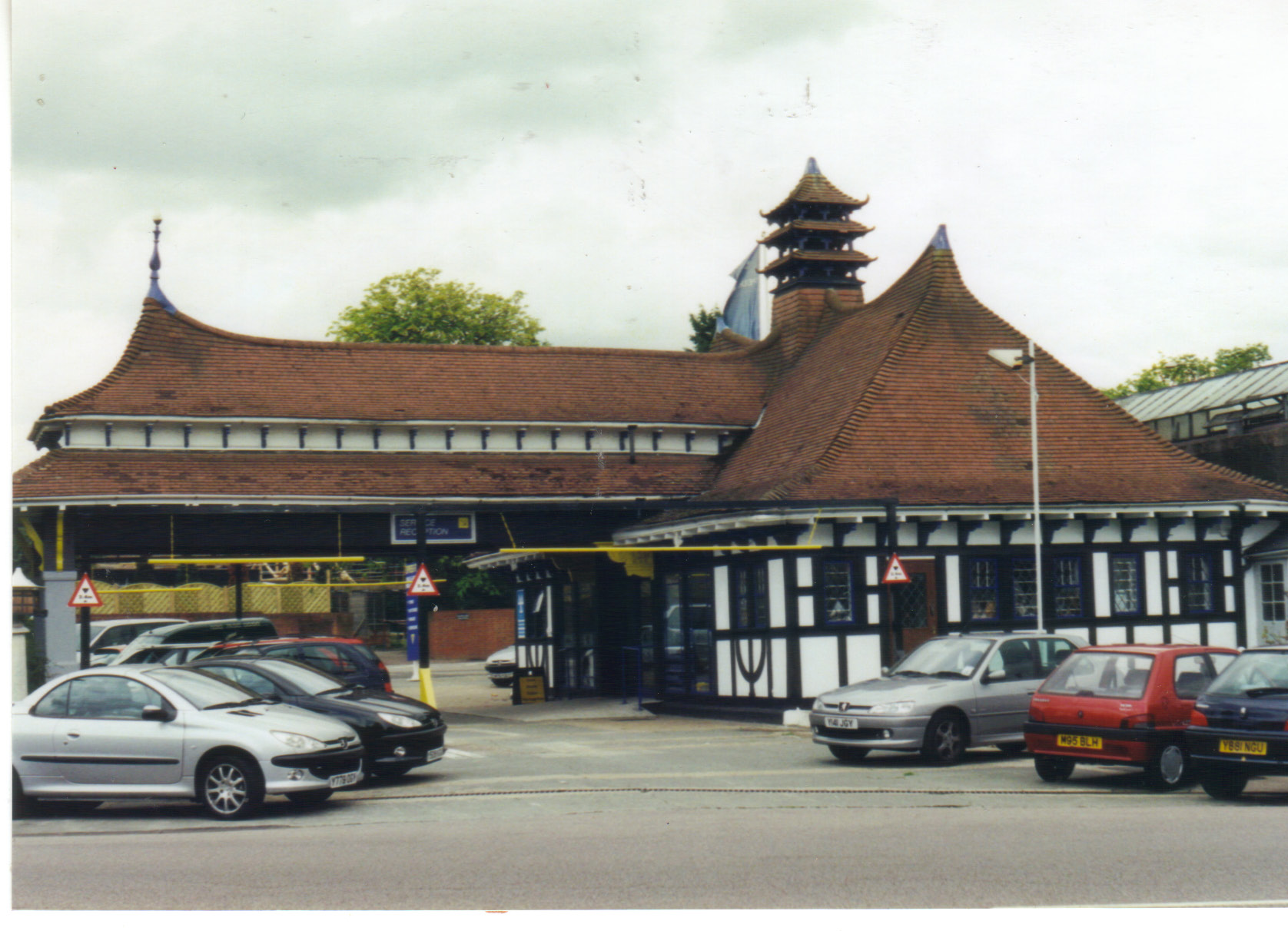
The Chinese Garage, now listed at grade II

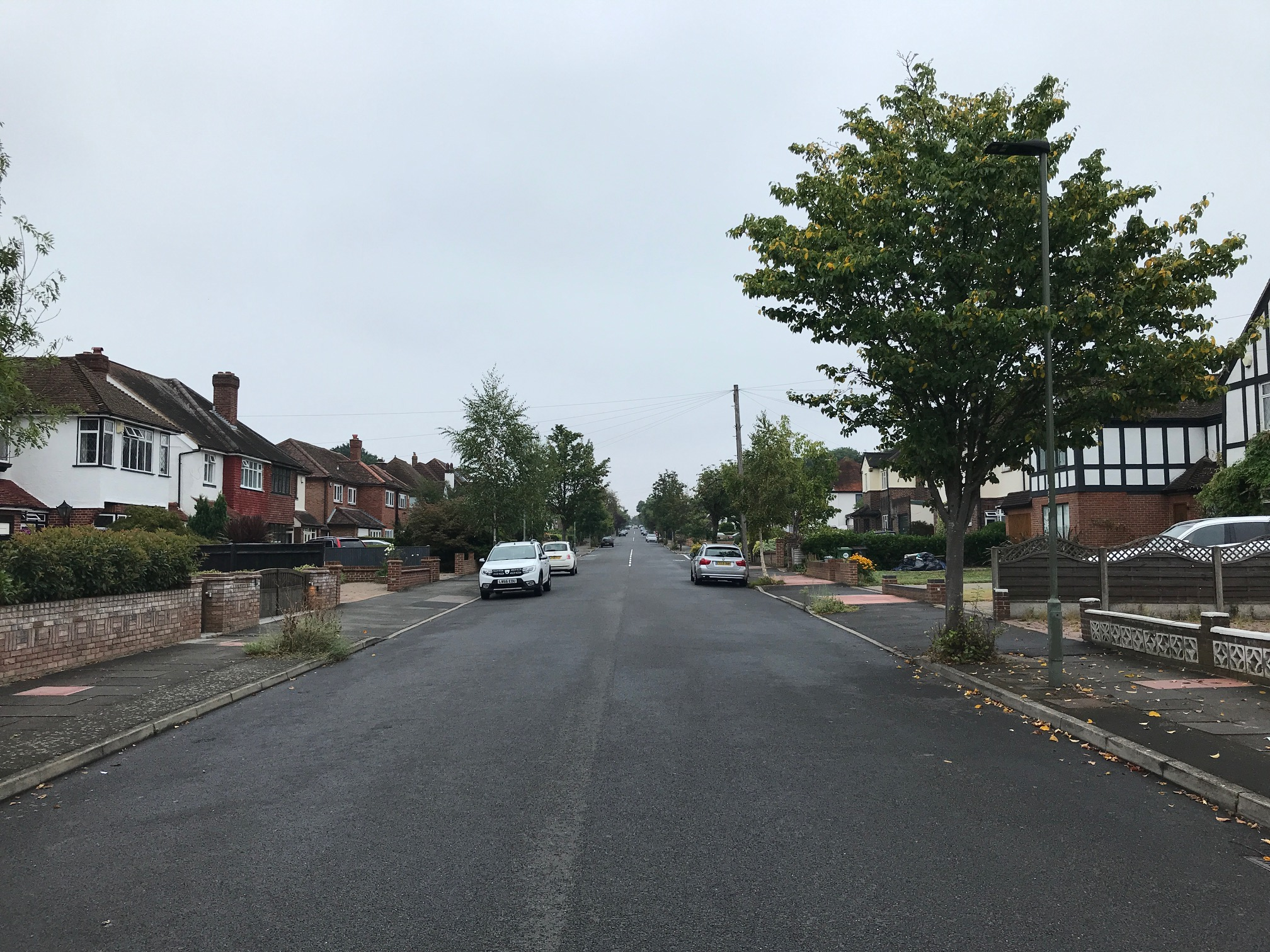
Brabourne Rise, a typical street in the area, with a wide road lined by large detached houses

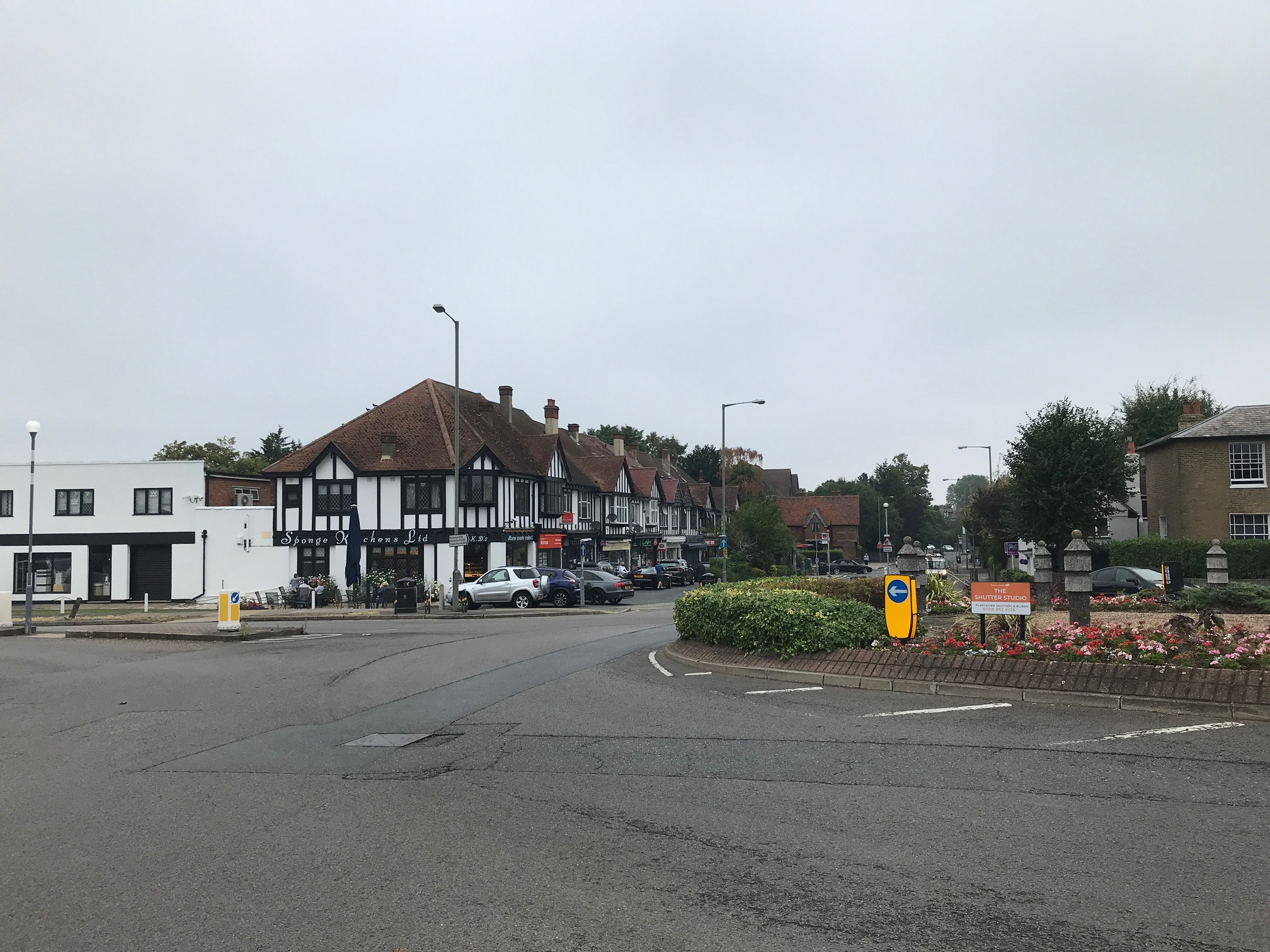
Shops at the bottom end of Wickham Road
