= Langley Wood, Cambridgeshire =

Wood in Cambridgeshire, England

Coordinates: 52.057°N 0.342°E

Langley Wood
- Site of Special Scientific Interest
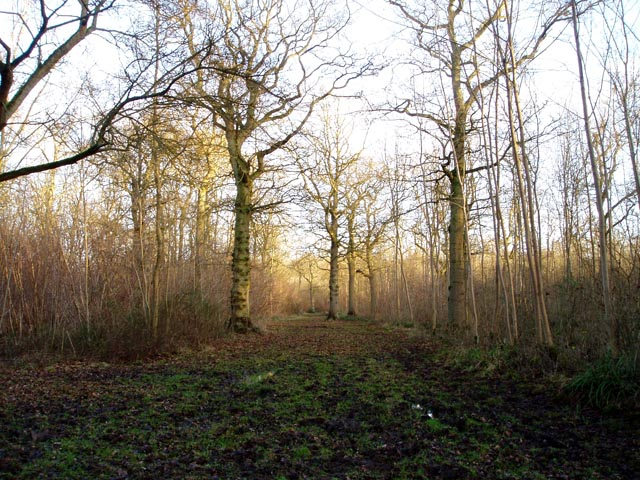
- Location of Langley Wood.
- Area of search: Cambridgeshire
- Grid reference: TL 607 424
- Interest: Biological
- Area: 31.6 hectares
- Notification date: 1984
- Location map: Magic Map

Langley Wood is a 31.6-hectare (78-acre) biological Site of Special Scientific Interest in Cambridgeshire, but lying between Saffron Walden in Essex and Haverhill in Suffolk.

This ancient wood has coppiced ash and hornbeam, together with maple, hazel and oak. Flora include dog’s mercury, sanicle and the uncommon sweet woodruff.

The site is private land with no public access.
