= Langley Island =

Langley Island may refer to:

- Langley Island (Maryland), an island on the Potomac river
- Langley Island (Massachusetts)

== See also ==
- Langlade Island, Saint Pierre and Miquelon
