= Langley Speedway =

Langley Speedway may refer to a number of racetracks:

- Langley Speedway (British Columbia), Langley, British Columbia (1978 last NASCAR Winston West race)
- Langley Speedway (Virginia), Hampton, Virginia, hosted the final Grand National race before the series was renamed Winston Cup (November 1970)
