= Langley Park Estate =

Coordinates: 51.3993°N 0.0182°W

The Langley Park Estate was an English country house estate on the south side of Beckenham, Kent.

Over the centuries the estate was owned by the Malmains, Style, Elwill and Burrell families.

The Langley Farm forming the west side of the estate was sold in the 1880s. By 1903 the remaining estate and mansion were vacant. It was bought by H & G Taylor Builders who began developing the land as the Park Langley Estate in 1910. They retained the mansion as the club house to their new golf club. The mansion was subsequently destroyed by fire.

The family names of the previous estate owners are used for roads laid out by H & G Taylor.
