= Odyssey Cinema, St Albans =

Preserved film theatre in southeast England

Odyssey Cinema
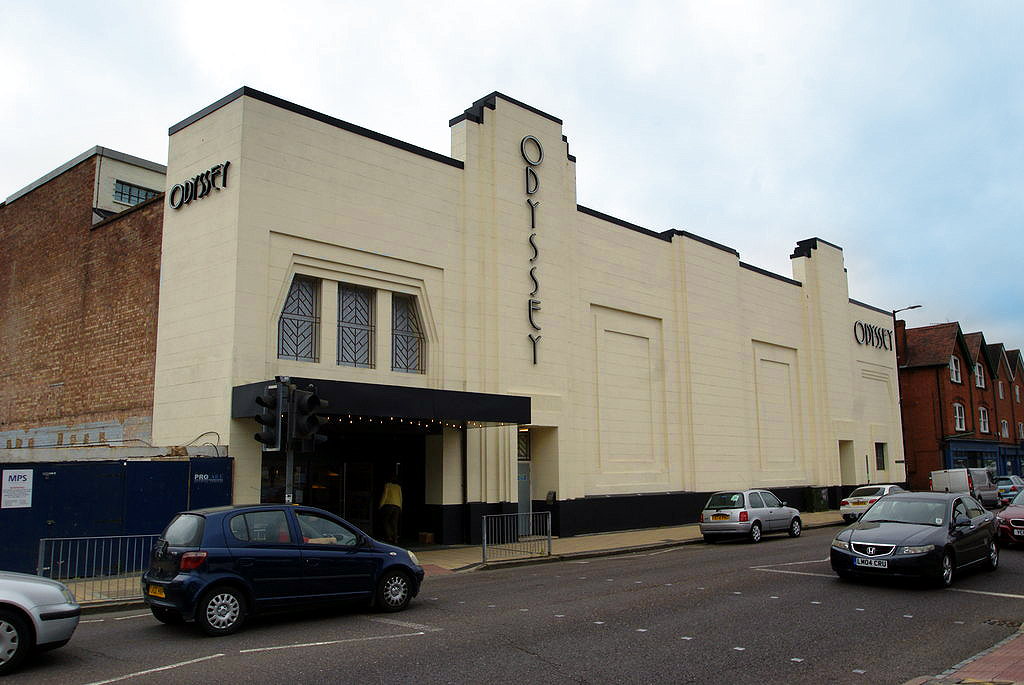
- The Odyssey Cinema

- Location within Hertfordshire
- Former names: Alpha Picture Palace (1908–18); Poly Picture Palace (1918–1926); The Regent (1926–1931); The Capitol (1931–1945); The Odeon (1945–1995)
- Address: London Road; St Albans; England, UK
- Coordinates: 51.7479352°N 0.3325751°W
- Owner: Private investors
- Capacity: 500 (previously 1,728)
- Type: Independent cinema
- Designation: Locally listed building
- Public transit: St Albans City

Construction
- Opened: 1908
- Closed: 1995
- Reopened: 2014
- Rebuilt: 1931
- Years active: 1908–1995; 2010–present
- Architects: Percival Blow, James Martin Hatfield, Kemp & Tasker

Website
- odysseypictures.co.uk

The Odyssey Cinema is a film theatre in the city of St Albans, Hertfordshire, in the United Kingdom. It is a locally listed Art Deco building, located on London Road, around 0.7 kilometres (0.43 mi) east of St Albans Cathedral. Originally built in 1931 as the Capitol Cinema, the current building stands on the site of an earlier film theatre, the Alpha Picture Palace. This former cinema was of particular historical significance as it was opened in 1904 by the film-making pioneer Arthur Melbourne-Cooper and is considered to have been the first cinema in Hertfordshire.

== History ==
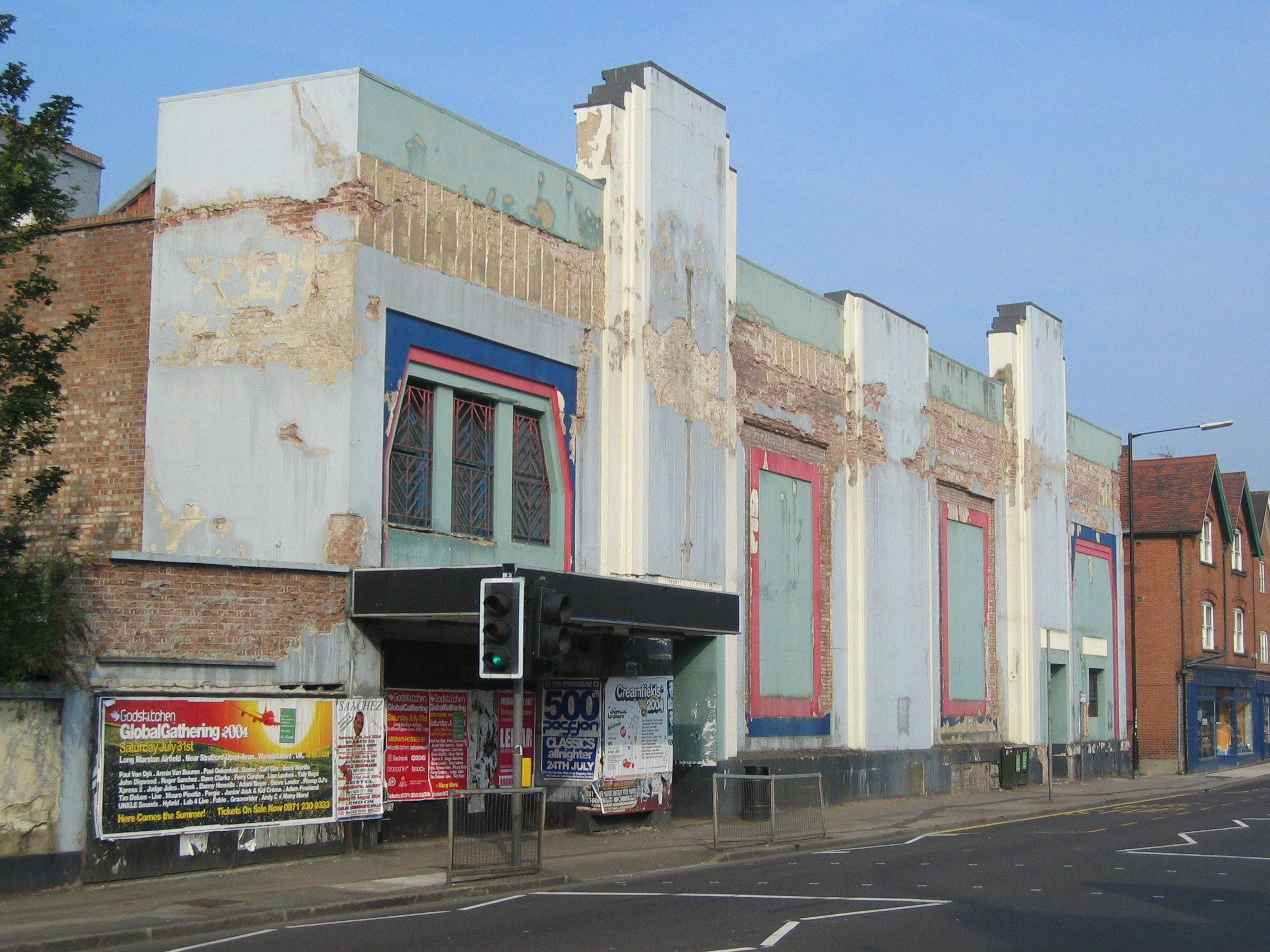
The Odeon St Albans in 2004, prior to restoration

Arthur Melbourne Cooper was born in St Albans in 1874 at 99 London Road. As a teenager, he was inspired to go into the new art of moving photography when he became acquainted with Birt Acres, and he became a noted figure in the history of early cinema as a pioneering filmmaker. Cooper founded his Alpha Trading Company in 1906 to make short films, animations and newsreels. He set up the Alpha Production Works in Bedford Park Road, later moving to larger premises at Alma Road. Among the pioneering films he shot in St Albans was the animated fantasy, Dreams of Toyland (1908).

Cooper wanted to establish a film theatre to present his productions to the paying public, and acquired a public hall building on London Road that had originally been designed for a social institute in 1903 by the local architect Percival Blow (1873–1939). On 27 July 1908, Cooper opened the Alpha Picture House, Hertfordshire's first permanent cinema. The building was fitted out with a restaurant, swimming pool and hairdressing salon as well as the 800 seat cinema. The cinema failed inspection following the passing of the 1910 Cinematograph Act and was sold through liquidation to George Arthur Dawson the following year. The cinema continued to run as the Poly until 1926 and was destroyed by fire the following year.

In 1911, Cooper sold his studios and the London Road cinema. It changed hands several times, taking on different names. In 1918, it became the Poly Picture Palace. In 1923, the cinema underwent another refurbishment by Percival Blow, which involved the installation of a balcony with boxes and a cinema organ, and a dance hall and workshop in the basement. From 1926 it was known as The Regent Picture House.

On 15 December 1927 The Regent was gutted by a large fire caused by a dropped cigarette. Plans were drawn up the following year to erect a replacement cinema and a new building was designed by Percival Blow and James Martin Hatfield with internal decorations designed by Robert Cromie. The new cinema featured a seating capacity of 1,620 with a 20-foot-deep stage, a two-manual Compton theatre organ, a café and dressing rooms. Because of the sloping site, patrons entered the cinema at balcony level and ten descended to the stalls. Now called The Capitol Cinema, it opened to the public on 3 December 1931.

In 1932, the Capitol was sold again, this time to the D.J. James Cinema Circuit, and in 1934 the cinema underwent a major extension and refurbishment by the architect firm Kemp & Tasker, expanding the seating capacity to 1,728. The cinema changed hands again in 1937, when D.J. James was bought by Eastern Cinemas, part of the General Cinema Finance (GCF) group, and in 1943, GCF was in turn taken over by the Rank Organisation, who rebranded the Capitol under their Odeon Cinema Circuit name on 1 January 1945.

On 30 October 1963, The Rolling Stones along with The Everly Brothers, Bo Diddley, Little Richard and Julie Grant appeared at the cinema.

Despite the increasing attraction of television in the 1950s and 60s, the St Albans Odeon continued to run a successful business, showing new Cinemascope films to attract audiences. Audiences declined in the 1970s, and the Odeon was divided into three smaller screens in 1973. It re-opened on 21 January with a screening of A Clockwork Orange in Screen 1.

=== Closure ===
By the 1990s, cinema chains had shifted their focus to large, out-of-town multiplexes and divested themselves of smaller town cinemas. With the opening of the new cinema complex at Jarman Park in Hemel Hempstead in 1995, Rank decided to close the St Albans Odeon. Despite the efforts of a local campaign to save the cinema, it closed to the public on 20 August 1995. The last film screened was Waterworld. After closure, the building was stripped of its fixtures and fittings.

=== Re-opening ===
The building was derelict for many years. It was purchased by a property developer who proposed demolishing it to make way for flats. A campaign to preserve the cinema by the local civic society failed to garner support from St Albans City and District Council, who voted to have the cinema demolished. One local councilor was quoted as saying "nobody wanted it back as a cinema" and dismissed claims about the cinema's history as "cod history",

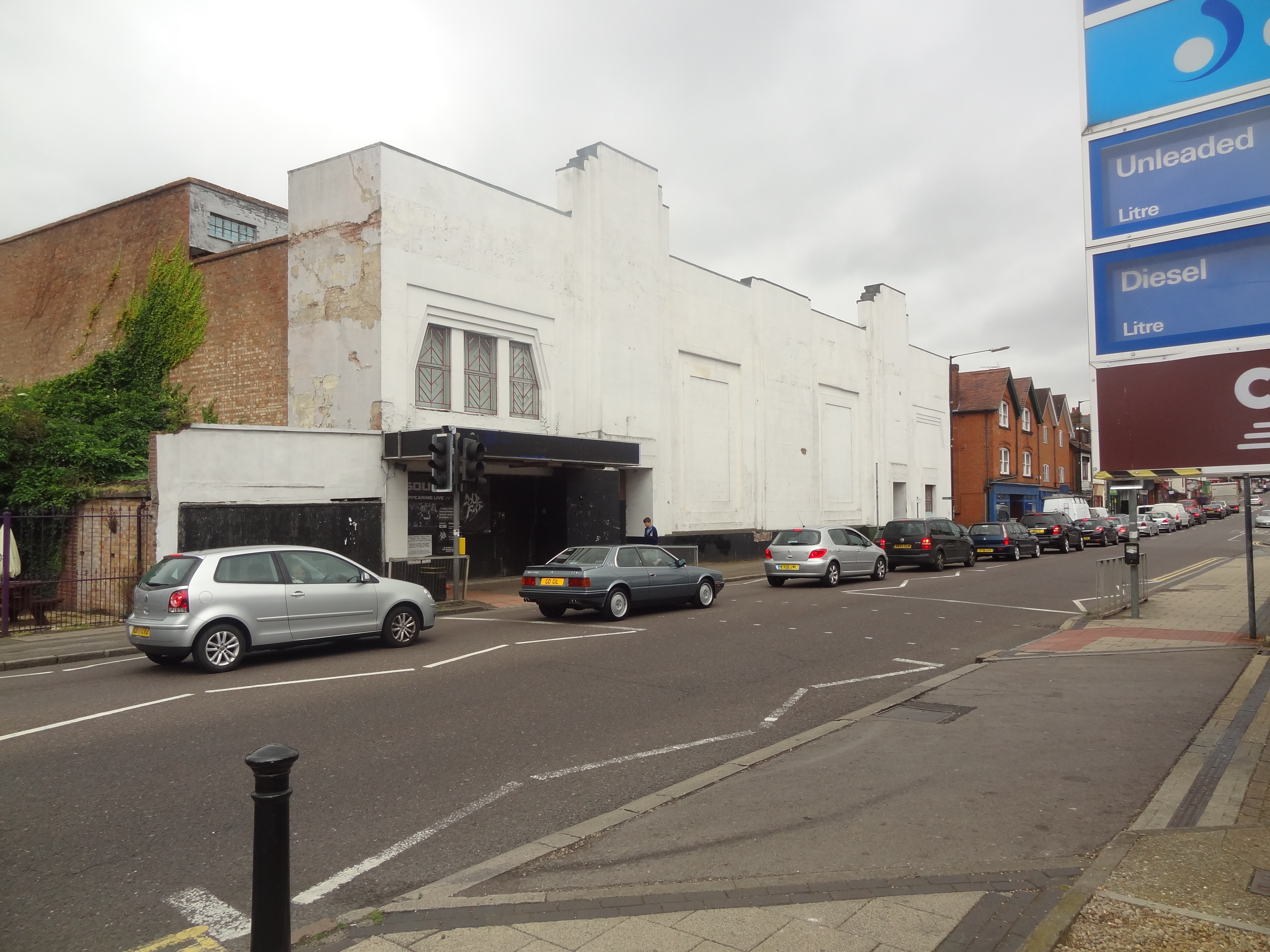
The Odyssey in 2012, during restoration with the exterior repainted.

In November 2009, with the help of local fundraisers, including school children, the old cinema building was purchased by local entrepreneur James Hannaway, with a plan to refurbish and re-open it as a cinema. Hannaway had previously led a project to re-open another historic Art Deco cinema, The Rex, Berkhamsted, around 15 kilometres (9.3 mi) west of St Albans. A further fundraising campaign was started to restore the cinema to its original 1930s glory and a new name – The Odyssey – was chosen following a public competition. It was named after 2001: A Space Odyssey, in honour of director Stanley Kubrick, who had family connections with St Albans. Restoration work began in 2013 and the cinema re-opened to the public on 30 November 2014 as an independent, single-screen, arthouse cinema with seating for 500 and a café and bar.

== Architecture ==
The building is noted for its Art Deco styling.
