= Langley Hall (disambiguation) =

Langley Hall is a Grade I listed country house in Norfolk, UK.

Langley Hall may also refer to:

== Buildings ==
- Langley Hall (Bendigo), Victoria, Australia
- Langley Hall, Cheshire, England
- Langley Hall, East Berkshire College, Berkshire, UK
- Langley Hall, West Midlands, Warwickshire, UK
- Langley Hall (University of Pittsburgh), Pittsburgh, US

== Other uses ==
- Dawn Langley Simmons (born Gordon Langley Hall, 1922–2000), English author
