= Brent Eleigh Woods =

UK Site of Special Scientific Interest

Coordinates: 52.09°N 0.83°E

- Site of Special Scientific Interest
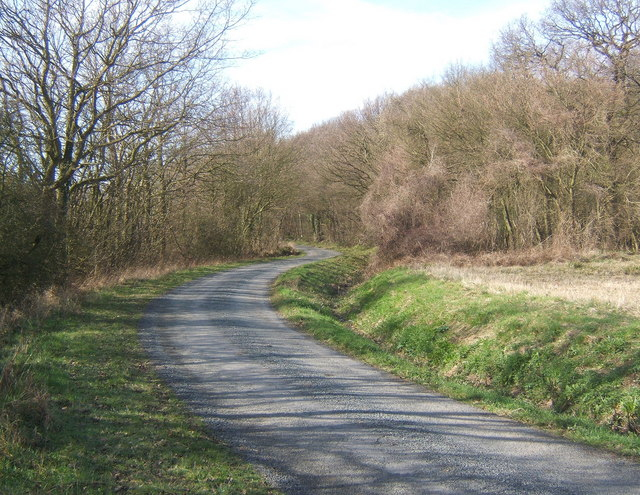
- Location of Brent Eleigh Woods.
- Area of search: Suffolk
- Grid reference: TL 938 473
- Interest: Biological
- Area: 31.7 hectares
- Notification date: 1986
- Location map: Magic Map

Brent Eleigh Woods is a 31.7-hectare (78-acre) biological Site of Special Scientific Interest south-east of Lavenham in Suffolk, England.

This site consists of three separate areas, Spragg's, Langley and Camps Woods. They are ancient woodland on calcareous clay soils. The main trees are oak and ash, and there are ponds and a stream.

The woods are private land with no public access.
