= USS Langley =

USS Langley may refer to:

Ships:

- USS Langley (CV-1), the first aircraft carrier of the United States Navy, converted from the collier Jupiter in 1922, and scuttled in February 1942 after being disabled by the Japanese
- USS Langley (DE‑131), laid down 10 July 1942 and renamed Hammann on 1 August 1942
- USS Langley (CVL-27), a light aircraft carrier commissioned in 1943, active in World War II, and transferred to France in 1951

Others:

- USS Langley, a Unix Space Server which provides proof of concept for global internet access via a nanosatellite constellation. The satellite was launched aboard the Atlas V mission designated as USA-261 on 20 May 2015.
