= Langley Academy, Slough =

The Langley Academy

Location
- Langley Road; Langley, Slough, Berkshire, SL3 7EF; England; 51.5035°N 0.5543°W

Information
- Type: Academy
- Motto: Curiosity, Exploration, Discovery
- Established: 2008
- Local authority: Slough
- Specialist: Science
- Department for Education URN: 135631 Tables
- Head teacher: Alison Lusuardi
- Gender: Co-educational
- Age: 11 to 18
- Website: http://www.langleyacademy.org/

The Langley Academy is an academy in Langley, east of Slough in Berkshire, southeast England. It opened in September 2008, replacing the former Langleywood Secondary School. The building was designed by Foster and Partners, led by the architect Norman Foster and by Buro Happold. The school is supported by the Arbib Foundation. It has a specialism of science and a museum education theme, including exhibits throughout the school building. It also has specialist sport facility’s, notably in cricket and rowing. The school is also home to a MUGA (multi-use game area) and a 3G Astro Pitch for football.

The main building is split up into wings, with there being the North Wing, South Wing and West Wing. Each of the wings contain two floors with approximately 14 rooms in each. The school is home to a specialist 6th Form Centre which was recently opened, named the ‘Sir Martyn Arbib 6th Form Centre’. It consists of one floor and is home to a sixth form library and many classrooms in which Humanities subjects are taught.

== History ==
Langley Wood Secondary School was created in 1982 on the site of the former Langley Secondary Modern School following a merger with the former Homewood Secondary Modern School. As of 2005 Langley wood had about 800 pupils. From 2003 to 2005, Langley wood was in Ofsted 'special measures'

In July 2004, Slough Borough Council, the local education authority, agreed to support the establishment of an academy on the Langley Wood site. Langley Wood closed in July 2008 and was replaced by The Langley Academy in September 2008. The new academy opened in new buildings designed by Foster and Partners and was sponsored by the Arbib Foundation.

The progress made in the first two years was noted by OFSTED in the Section 8 report from July 2010, where the academy was classed as having made 'good progress', in contrast to many other academies that opened at the same time. Its exam results rose significantly during the first three years, outperforming the school it had replaced.

The principal, Chris Bowler, left the academy before the full OFSTED inspection in July 2011. He was replaced by Peter Blewitt as acting principal until a permanent appointment was made in the autumn term when Rhodri Bryant was appointed as the new principal.

== Houses ==
All students in the Langley Academy are assigned to one of six houses each with its own focus. Each half term is allocated to a house and students listen to an assembly about the houses and the focuses of each of them by the Head of House. All the houses below are:

- Arbib – Sustainability
- Nash – Humanitarianism
- Simmons – Internationalism
- Herschel – Enquiry
- Holmes – Sportsmanship
- Kumar – Creativity
