= Ideal Home Show =

Annual event in London, England

Coordinates: 51°29′20″N 0°11′52″W

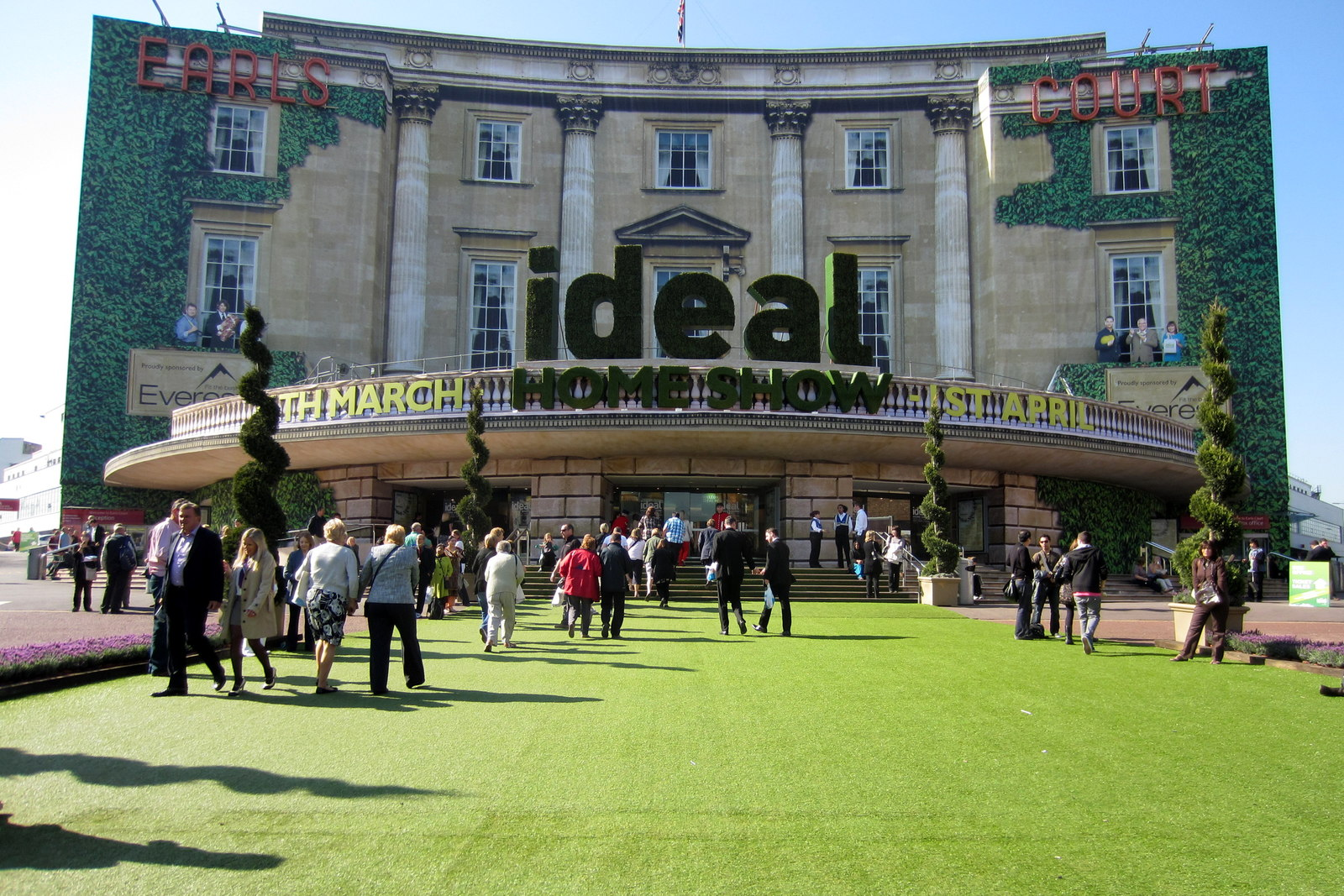
The Ideal Home Show at Earls Court in 2012

The Ideal Home Show (formerly called the Ideal Home Exhibition) is an annual event in London, England, held at Olympia. The show was devised by the Daily Mail newspaper in 1908 and continued to be run by the Daily Mail until 2009. It was then sold to events and publishing company Media 10.

== Overview ==
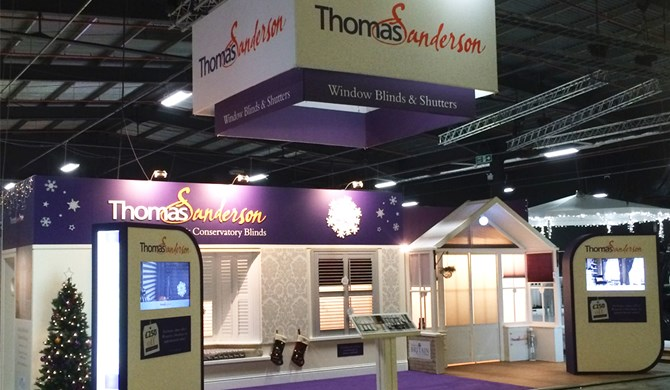
A stand at the Manchester show, 2016

The goal of the Ideal Home Show is to bring together everything associated with having an "ideal home", such as the latest inventions for the modern house, and to showcase the latest housing designs. A regular feature of the show for many years was the Ideal House Competition, where designs were invited and the winning schemes erected at the exhibition the following year.

The first exhibition was held in 1908 at the Olympia exhibition centre, with sections dedicated to "phases of home life" such as construction, food and cookery, furniture and decoration. Demonstrations and contests included an Arts and Crafts competition and a competition to design the "Ideal Home". Wareham Smith, advertising manager of the Daily Mail, founded the exhibition as a marketing event for the newspaper. It was often visited by celebrities and royalty.

The archive is held at the V and A Museum.

== 1908–1919 ==
The inaugural Daily Mail Ideal Home Exhibition was opened by the Lord Mayor of London at Olympia and the Daily Mail explained that you would see:

Streets of a town lined with hundreds of bright little buildings of varying shape and design – red roofed cottages, brown bungalows, and gaily coloured pavilions – and moving between them endless lines of interested visitors.

Visitors queued to view the furnished houses and to tour a landscaped garden. Stands became rooms with all the merchandise available for sale – offering the opportunity for people to see the latest designs for luxury living.

In 1908, 90 per cent of the population rented their home. It took more than 3,000 men a week to build the first Exhibition.

Lord Northcliffe, proprietor of the Daily Mail, founded the Ideal Home exhibition in 1908 at London's Olympia exhibition centre, in the spirit of social reform, to stimulate debate about better housing conditions. For a fee of one shilling, the public were educated and entertained by displays of labour-saving appliances and show homes.

The exhibition was next held in 1910, then 1912 and 1913, disrupted by the 1914–18 First World War.

A dispute about the content of a room designed by members of the Omega Workshops for the 1913 show was instrumental in the secession of several artists from that group.

== The 1920s and 1930s ==
Technological developments gathered pace throughout the 1920s and 1930s and new products were often featured in demonstrations at the Show. The event became a focal point for the housewife to view the latest in household technology.

Throughout the 1930s building was Britain's chief industry, and the suburbs began to spread. Mortgages were becoming more accessible and more people than ever before bought their first home.

The Daily Mail was committed to the drive for greater efficiency and for one year in 1921 it even renamed the show the "Daily Mail Efficiency Exhibition". In 1939, the BBC transmitted a television broadcast from the event for the first time although it had been making radio broadcasts from the exhibition since 1923.

== 1940s–1970s ==
The Second World War meant that the exhibition was suspended from 1940 to 1946 but from 1947 onwards it continued to grow, culminating in a huge attendance in 1957 of almost 1.5 million people. The show continued to "Educate and Entertain" throughout the decades and in 1953, year of the Coronation of Elizabeth II, the exhibition even featured a two-thirds scale copy of the state coach.

The first microwave oven was launched at the show in 1947. In 1957 the British housewife still spent an average of 70 hours a week on housework

The 1960s was an era of forward-looking fashion and the first humans on the Moon, yet the most popular house style of the period was mock-Georgian. One exhibit, in 1960, "A Home in Space" was created by the Douglas Aircraft Company. It was a full mockup of a potential space station design and visited by 150,000–200,000 people. It has been cited as an important step towards the creation of operative space stations.

The disco decade of the 1970s ushered in a new look for interiors featuring chrome and smoked glass, and the show reflected trends in all the latest house designs and interiors.

== 1980–present ==
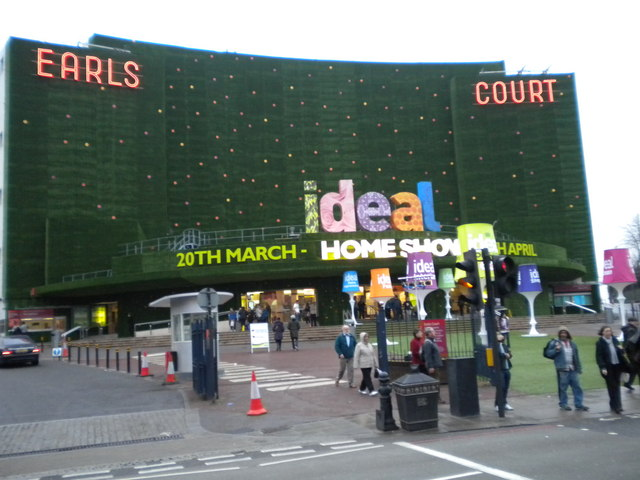
The event in 2010

Corner baths and conservatories caught the eye in the 1980s and new technology was still very much in evidence. Through the 1990s, a new shopping experience was developed for the Show, with entertainment high on the agenda and a mission to provide everything for the home in one environment.

In 1997, a rainforest was created and visitors could experience a tropical downpour every hour from the shelter of a tree house. In 2008, people could take a trip down memory lane and see some of the highlights of the last century in the Century Street. In September 2009 the show changed hands for the first time in its history, after being sold by the Daily Mail to Media 10. The 2010 Ideal Home Show won the award for Best Consumer Show over 2,000sqm at the Industry AEO Awards. The 2011 Ideal Home Show took place from 11 to 27 March at Earls Court Exhibition Centre. With more than 50,000 buyers each exhibitor sold goods worth £1,000,000.

In 2008, one of the more adventurous bedroom recreations was that of Shirley Bassey. Bassey appeared to have a 10' x 10' bedroom, with bedlinen from Dunelm Group. A mannequin of Bassey, dressed in tight-fitting sequined nightie, was stood – arms outstretched – as though she'd just got out of bed to sing "Goldfinger" to members of the public passing through her Ideal Home bedroom.
