= 1936 Dagenham Urban District Council election =

1936 UK local government election

- 4 April 1936

7 of 23 seats to the Dagenham Urban District Council 12 seats needed for a majority
	First party	Second party
	LAB	RA
Party	Labour	Ratepayers
Seats before	18	6
Seats won	6	1
Seats after	18	6
Seat change	Steady	Steady
Majority party before election
Labour
Majority party after election
Labour

The 11th election to Dagenham Urban District Council took place on 4 April 1936.

== Background ==
In 1936 seven of the seats were up for re-election:

- Becontree Heath, 3 seats (out of 8)
- Chadwell Heath, 1 seat (out of 5)
- Dagenham, 3 seats (out of 10)

The seats were last contested three years prior at the election in 1933. Members were elected in 1936 for a three-year term that was due to end in 1939. However, Dagenham was incorporated as a municipal borough in 1938. Terms were cut short in November 1938 and an all-out election took place.

Polling took place on 4 April 1936.

== Results ==
The results were as follows:

=== Becontree Heath ===
Becontree Heath
Party	Candidate	Votes	%	±%
Labour	William Langlois (Note: William Langlois was previously elected for a three-year term in 1933.)			
Labour	Herbert Lyons (Note: Herbert Lyons was previously elected for a three-year term in 1933.)			
Labour	Mrs McAllister			
Ratepayers	G. Smith			
Turnout				
Labour hold		Swing		
Labour hold		Swing		
Labour hold		Swing		

=== Chadwell Heath ===
Chadwell Heath
Party	Candidate	Votes	%	±%
Ratepayers	Henry Dyer (Note: Henry Dyer was previously elected for a three-year term in 1933.)			
Labour	Anne Boardman			
Turnout				
Ratepayers hold		Swing		

=== Dagenham ===
Dagenham
Party	Candidate	Votes	%	±%
Labour	John Preston (Note: John Preston was previously elected for a three-year term in 1933.)			
Labour	Alfred Rogers (Note: Alfred Rogers was previously elected for a three-year term in 1933.)			
Labour	Mrs Stockbridge			
Ratepayers	A. Hobart			
Ratepayers	W. Melton			
Ratepayers	W. Smith			
Residents	W. Meachen			
Turnout				
Labour hold		Swing		
Labour hold		Swing		
Labour hold		Swing		
