= 1935 Dagenham Urban District Council election =

1935 UK local government election

- 30 March 1935

9 of 23 seats to the Dagenham Urban District Council 12 seats needed for a majority
	First party	Second party
	LAB	RA
Party	Labour	Ratepayers
Seats before	17	7
Seats won	7	2
Seats after	18	6
Seat change	▲1	▼1
Majority party before election
Labour
Majority party after election
Labour

The 10th election to Dagenham Urban District Council took place on 30 March 1935.

== Background ==
In 1935 nine of the seats were up for re-election:

- Becontree Heath, 3 seats (out of 8)
- Chadwell Heath, 2 seats (out of 5)
- Dagenham, 4 seats (out of 10)

The seats were last contested in 1932. Polling took place on 30 March 1935.

== Results ==
The results were as follows:

=== Becontree Heath ===
Becontree Heath
Party	Candidate	Votes	%	±%
Labour	A. Bale	1,260		
Labour	Mary Marley (Note: Mary Marley was previously elected for a one-year term in 1934.)	1,235		
Labour	E. Hennem	1,222		
Ratepayers	C. Dutchie	115		
Turnout				
Labour hold		Swing		
Labour hold		Swing		
Labour hold		Swing		

=== Chadwell Heath ===
Chadwell Heath
Party	Candidate	Votes	%	±%
Ratepayers	Eric Howard	665		
Ratepayers	B. Saunders	660		
Independent	C. Knight	367		
Labour	E. Cock	200		
Labour	Anne Boardman	189		
Turnout				
Ratepayers hold		Swing		
Ratepayers hold		Swing		

=== Dagenham ===
Dagenham
Party	Candidate	Votes	%	±%
Labour	L. Townsend (Note: L. Townsend was previously elected for a three-year term in 1932.)	1,083		
Labour	Reginald Minchin (Note: Reginald Minchin was previously elected at the 1933 Dagenham ward by-election.)	1,055		
Labour	Alfred Chorley	1,048		
Labour	W. Legon	1,035		
Independent	William Gray (Note: William Gray was previously elected for a three-year term in 1932 as a Labour Party candidate.)	391		
Turnout				
Labour hold		Swing		
Labour hold		Swing		
Labour hold		Swing		
Labour gain from Ratepayers		Swing		
