= 1934 Dagenham Urban District Council election =

1934 UK local government election

- 24 March 1934

9 of 23 seats to the Dagenham Urban District Council 12 seats needed for a majority
	First party	Second party
	LAB	RA
Party	Labour	Ratepayers
Seats before	17	7
Seats won	7	2
Seats after	17	7
Seat change	Steady	Steady
Majority party before election
Labour
Majority party after election
Labour

The ninth election to Dagenham Urban District Council took place on 24 March 1934. The ratepayers' associations did not put up candidates outside of the Chadwell Heath ward, which meant Labour Party candidates in Becontree Heath ward were returned unopposed. A. Chorley was not reselected as the Labour Party candidate for Becontree Heath ward, but was able to stand in Dagenham. F. Hudson stood for election again, but was not eligible to stand as a Labour Party candidate. The election resulted in no change to the Labour Party majority on the council.

== Background ==
In 1934 nine of the seats were up for re-election:

- Becontree Heath, 3 seats (out of 8)
- Chadwell Heath, 2 seats (out of 5)
- Dagenham, 4 seats (out of 10)

Polling took place on 24 March 1934.

== Results ==
The results were as follows:

=== Becontree Heath ===
Becontree Heath
Party	Candidate	Votes	%	±%
Labour	J. Bradbeer	Unopposed		
Labour	C. Dellow	Unopposed		
Labour	Mary Marley (Note: Mary Marley was previously elected for a two-year term in 1932.)	Unopposed		
Labour hold		Swing		
Labour hold		Swing		
Labour hold		Swing		

=== Chadwell Heath ===
Chadwell Heath
Party	Candidate	Votes	%	±%
Ratepayers	H. Atkinson (Note: H. Atkinson was previously elected at the 1933 Chadwell Heath ward by-election.)	830		
Ratepayers	G. Smith (Note: G. Smith was previously elected for a three-year term in 1931.)	817		
Labour	E. Cox	320		
Labour	Ernest Hennem	318		
Turnout				
Ratepayers hold		Swing		
Ratepayers hold		Swing		

=== Dagenham ===
Dagenham
Party	Candidate	Votes	%	±%
Labour	William Markham (Note: William Markham was previously elected for a three-year term in 1931.)	1,688		
Labour	T. Cain	1,664		
Labour	A. Chorley (Note: A. Chorley was previously elected for a three-year term in 1931 for Becontree Heath.)	1,610		
Labour	R. Clack	1,609		
Communist	E. Clarke	260		
Communist	W. Hall	177		
Communist	J. Cousins	146		
Residents	W. Meachen (Note: W. Meachen stood for the Manor Farm Residents' Association)	127		
Independent Labour	F. Hudson (Note: F. Hudson was previously elected for a three-year term in 1931 as a Labour Party candidate.)	103		
Independent Labour	Doris Hudson	96		
Residents	George Tate (Note: G. Tate stood for the Manor Farm Residents' Association)	38		
Turnout				
Labour hold		Swing		
Labour hold		Swing		
Labour hold		Swing		
Labour hold		Swing		
