= 1937 Dagenham Urban District Council election =

1937 UK local government election

- 3 April 1937

15 of 33 seats to the Dagenham Urban District Council 17 seats needed for a majority
	First party	Second party
	LAB	RA
Party	Labour	Ratepayers
Seats before	18	6
Seats won	13	2
Majority party before election
Labour
Majority party after election
Labour

The twelfth election to Dagenham Urban District Council took place on 3 April 1937.

== Background ==
For the 1937 election the number of wards was increased from three to six, with the number of councillors increased from 23 to 33.

In 1937 fifteen of the seats were up for election:

- Becontree, 4 seats
- Becontree Heath, 2 seats
- Chadwell Heath, 2 seats
- Dagenham North West, 2 seats
- Dagenham South, 5 seats

Polling took place on 3 April 1937.

Members were elected in 1937 for a three-year term that was due to end in 1940. However, Dagenham was incorporated as a municipal borough on 1 October 1938. Terms were cut short to 1 November 1938 and an all-out election took place.

== Results ==
The results were as follows:

=== Becontree ===
Becontree
Party	Candidate	Votes	%	±%
Labour	A. Banks	Unopposed		
Labour	C. Dellow (Note: C. Dellow was previously elected for a three-year term in 1934 for Becontree Heath ward.)	Unopposed		
Labour	Annie Thomas	Unopposed		
Labour	F. Thomas	Unopposed		

=== Becontree Heath ===
Becontree Heath
Party	Candidate	Votes	%	±%
Labour	F. Brown	Unopposed		
Labour	A. Butters	Unopposed		

=== Chadwell Heath ===
Chadwell Heath
Party	Candidate	Votes	%	±%
Ratepayers	C. Wilson	502		
Ratepayers	J. Andrews	496		
Labour	Anne Boardman	459		
Labour	A. Crocombe	264		

=== Dagenham North West ===
Dagenham North West
Party	Candidate	Votes	%	±%
Labour	W. Bellamy	Unopposed		
Labour	J. Burridge	Unopposed		

=== Dagenham South ===
Dagenham South
Party	Candidate	Votes	%	±%
Labour	W. Markham (Note: W. Markham was previously elected for a three-year term in 1934 for Dagenham ward.)	441		
Labour	R. Clack (Note: R. Clack was previously elected for a three-year term in 1934 for Dagenham ward.)	439		
Labour	W. Cain (Note: W. Cain was previously elected for a three-year term in 1934 for Dagenham ward.)	436		
Labour	F. Rogers	422		
Labour	C. Hermitage	419		
Residents	W. Meacham	76		
