= 1929 Dagenham Urban District Council election =

1929 UK local government election

- 23 March 1929

13 of 23 seats to the Dagenham Urban District Council 12 seats needed for a majority
	First party	Second party
	LAB	IND
Party	Labour	Independent
Seats before	10	6
Seats won	11	2
Seats after	18	5
Seat change	▲8	▼1
Majority party before election
Labour
Majority party after election
Labour

The fourth election to Dagenham Urban District Council took place on 23 March 1929. From this election the total number of councillors was increased from 16 to 23, with seven additional members returned in 1929.

== Background ==
In 1929 thirteen of the seats were up for re-election:

- Becontree Heath, 5 seats (out of 8)
- Chadwell Heath, 2 seats (out of 5)
- Dagenham, 6 seats (out of 10)

Polling took place on 23 March 1929.

== Results ==
The results were as follows:

=== Becontree Heath ===
Becontree Heath
Party	Candidate	Votes	%	±%
Labour	Alfred Bale	1,632		
Labour	William Franks	1,596		
Labour	Samuel Phillips	1,568		
Labour	Richard Heatley	1,559		
Labour	William Langlois	1,408		
Independent	Herbert Amies (Note: Herbert Amies was previously elected for a three-year term in 1926.)	462		
Independent	George Coppen (Note: George Coppen was previously elected for a three-year term in 1926.)	340		
Independent	Sidney Smith	297		
Communist	Charles White	222		
Communist	Jacob Goldberg	199		
Turnout				
Labour gain from Independent		Swing		
Labour gain from Independent		Swing		
Labour win (new seat)				
Labour win (new seat)				
Labour win (new seat)				

=== Chadwell Heath ===
Chadwell Heath
Party	Candidate	Votes	%	±%
Independent	James Hilton	876		
Independent	Percival Ashton (Note: Percival Ashton was previously elected for a three-year term in 1926.)	847		
Labour	Alfred Chorley	491		
Turnout				
Independent hold		Swing		
Independent hold		Swing		

=== Dagenham ===
Dagenham
Party	Candidate	Votes	%	±%
Labour	Herbert Parry (Note: Herbert Parry was previously elected for a three-year term in 1926.)	2,048		
Labour	William Gray (Note: William Gray was previously elected for a three-year term in 1926.)	2,025		
Labour	John Preston	1,987		
Labour	Lily Townsend	1,978		
Labour	Francis Hudson	1,948		
Labour	Alfred Rogers	1,919		
Independent	Henry Bailey	1,254		
Independent	William Bolton	1,113		
Independent	Richard Alderson	1,113		
Independent	Charles Bolton-Clark	1,090		
Independent	Margaret Morris	1,059		
Independent	Edward Horsham	1,054		
Turnout				
Labour hold		Swing		
Labour hold		Swing		
Labour win (new seat)				
Labour win (new seat)				
Labour win (new seat)				
Labour win (new seat)				
