= 1931 Dagenham Urban District Council election =

1931 UK local government election

- 28 March 1931

7 of 23 seats to the Dagenham Urban District Council 12 seats needed for a majority
| | First party | Second party |
|---|---|---|
| | LAB | IND |
| Party | Labour | Independent |
| Seats before | 18 | 6 |
| Seats won | 5 | 2 |
| Seats after | 18 | 6 |
| Seat change | Steady | Steady |
Majority party before election
Labour
Majority party after election
Labour

The sixth election to Dagenham Urban District Council took place on 28 March 1931.

== Background ==
In 1931 seven of the seats were up for re-election:

- Becontree Heath, 2 seats (out of 8)
- Chadwell Heath, 2 seats (out of 5)
- Dagenham, 3 seats (out of 10)

Polling took place on 28 March 1931.

== Results ==
The results were as follows:

=== Becontree Heath ===
Becontree Heath
| Party | Candidate | Votes | % | ±% |
|---|---|---|---|---|
| Labour | A. Olive | Unopposed | | |
| Labour | A. Chorley | Unopposed | | |
| Labour hold | | Swing | | |
| Labour hold | | Swing | | |

=== Chadwell Heath ===
Chadwell Heath
| Party | Candidate | Votes | % | ±% |
|---|---|---|---|---|
| Independent | G. Smith (Note: G. Smith was previously elected for a three-year term in 1928.) | 1,293 | | |
| Independent | James Tyler (Note: James Tyler was previously elected for a three-year term in 1928.) | 1,287 | | |
| Labour | C. McAlister | 304 | | |
| Labour | A. Crocombe | 292 | | |
| Turnout | | | | |
| Independent hold | | Swing | | |
| Independent hold | | Swing | | |

=== Dagenham ===
Dagenham
| Party | Candidate | Votes | % | ±% |
|---|---|---|---|---|
| Labour | William Markham (Note: William Markham was previously elected for a three-year term in 1928.) | 1,227 | | |
| Labour | F. Hudson (Note: F. Hudson was previously elected for a two-year term in 1929.) | 1,205 | | |
| Labour | W. Melton (Note: W. Melton was previously elected for a three-year term in 1928.) | 1,137 | | |
| Ind. Conservative | R. Evans | 687 | | |
| Independent | S. Coppen | 475 | | |
| Independent | P. Grove | 330 | | |
| Communist | W. Hall | 256 | | |
| Turnout | | | | |
| Labour hold | | Swing | | |
| Labour hold | | Swing | | |
| Labour hold | | Swing | | |
