= 1927 Dagenham Urban District Council election =

1927 UK local government election

- 2 April 1927

5 of 16 seats to the Dagenham Urban District Council 9 seats needed for a majority
	First party	Second party
	LAB	IND
Party	Labour	Independent
Seats before	8	8
Seats won	4	1
Seats after	8	8
Seat change	Steady	Steady
Majority party before election
NOC
Majority party after election
NOC

The second election to Dagenham Urban District Council took place on 2 April 1927.

== Background ==
The 1926 election had been for all 16 councillors. In 1927 five of the seats were up for re-election:

- Becontree Heath, 2 seats (out of 5)
- Chadwell Heath, 1 seat (out of 5)
- Dagenham, 2 seats (out of 6)

Polling took place on 2 April 1927.

== Results ==
The results were as follows:

=== Becontree Heath ===
Becontree Heath
Party	Candidate	Votes	%	±%
Labour	Charles Dellow (Note: Charles Dellow was previously elected for a one-year term in 1926.)	1,002		
Labour	Mary Morris (Note: Mary Morris was previously elected for a one-year term in 1926.)	957		
Independent	W. Peters	718		
Ex-service	R. Sparkes	711		
Turnout				
Labour hold		Swing		
Labour hold		Swing		

=== Chadwell Heath ===
Chadwell Heath
Party	Candidate	Votes	%	±%
Independent	C. Knight (Note: C. Knight was previously elected for a one-year term in 1926.)	821		
Labour	W. Podmore	386		
Turnout				
Independent hold		Swing		

=== Dagenham ===
Dagenham
Party	Candidate	Votes	%	±%
Labour	Henry Hill (Note: H. Hill was previously elected for a one-year term in 1926.)	1,410		
Labour	Mary Rothwell	1,395		
Ratepayers	H. Bailey	1,257		
Ratepayers	W. Bruorton	1,183		
Turnout				
Labour hold		Swing		
Labour hold		Swing		
