= 1928 Dagenham Urban District Council election =

1928 UK local government election

- 31 March 1928

6 of 16 seats to the Dagenham Urban District Council 9 seats needed for a majority
	First party	Second party
	LAB	IND
Party	Labour	Independent
Seats before	8	8
Seats won	3	2
Seats after	10	6
Seat change	▲2	▼2
Majority party before election
NOC
Majority party after election
Labour

The third election to Dagenham Urban District Council took place on 31 March 1928. The Labour Party gained two seats and a majority on the council.

== Background ==
In 1928 six of the seats were up for re-election:

- Becontree Heath, 2 seats (out of 5), one of them a by-election caused by the resignation of Mary Morris.
- Chadwell Heath, 2 seats (out of 5)
- Dagenham, 2 seats (out of 6)

Nominations closed on 17 March 1928 and polling took place on 31 March 1928.

== Results ==
The results were as follows:

=== Becontree Heath ===
Becontree Heath
Party	Candidate	Votes	%	±%
Labour	R. Fisher	1,540		
Labour	A. Olive	1,512		
Independent	A. Aldridge	851		
Independent	Deverell	731		
Turnout				
Labour gain from Independent		Swing		
Labour gain from Independent		Swing		

=== Chadwell Heath ===
Chadwell Heath
Party	Candidate	Votes	%	±%
Independent	G. Smith (Note: G. Smith was previously elected for a two-year term in 1926.)	848		
Independent	James Tyler (Note: James Tyler was previously elected for a two-year term in 1926.)	831		
Labour	W. Podmore	394		
Turnout				
Independent hold		Swing		
Independent hold		Swing		

=== Dagenham ===
Dagenham
Party	Candidate	Votes	%	±%
Labour	J. Murphy (Note: J. Murphy was previously elected for a two-year term in 1926.)	1,681		
Labour	William Markham	1,663		
Independent	W. Burton	983		
Independent	R. Alderson	948		
Turnout				
Labour hold		Swing		
Labour hold		Swing		
