= 1938 Dagenham Urban District Council election =

1938 UK local government election

- 2 April 1938

12 of 33 seats to the Dagenham Urban District Council 17 seats needed for a majority
	First party	Second party
	LAB	RA
Party	Labour	Ratepayers
Seats won	9	3
Majority party before election
Labour
Majority party after election
Labour

The 13th election to Dagenham Urban District Council took place on 2 April 1938. It was the final election to the council, with another election required in November 1938 following the incorporation of Dagenham as a municipal borough.

== Background ==
In 1938 twelve of the seats were up for re-election:

- Becontree, 1 seat
- Becontree Heath, 2 seats
- Chadwell Heath, 3 seats
- Dagenham North East, 2 seats
- Dagenham North West, 2 seats
- Dagenham South, 2 seats

Polling took place on 2 April 1938.

Members were elected in 1938 for a three-year term that was due to end in 1941. However, Dagenham was incorporated as a municipal borough on 1 October 1938. Terms were cut short to 1 November 1938 and an all-out election took place.

== Results ==
The results were as follows:

=== Becontree ===
Becontree
Party	Candidate	Votes	%	±%
Labour	A. Thomas	Unopposed		
Labour hold				

=== Becontree Heath ===
Becontree Heath
Party	Candidate	Votes	%	±%
Labour	A. Bale (Note: A. Bale was previously elected for a three-year term in 1935.)	Unopposed		
Labour	E. Hennem (Note: E. Hennem was previously elected for a three-year term in 1935.)	Unopposed		
Labour hold				
Labour hold				

=== Chadwell Heath ===
Chadwell Heath
Party	Candidate	Votes	%	±%
Ratepayers	B. Saunders (Note: B. Saunders was previously elected for a three-year term in 1935.)	724		
Ratepayers	E. Osborne	715		
Ratepayers	E. Howard (Note: E. Howard was previously elected for a three-year term in 1935.)	713		
Labour	L. Bennett	510		
Labour	A. Broadman	472		
Labour	A. Crocombe	470		
Turnout				
Ratepayers hold		Swing		
Ratepayers hold		Swing		
Ratepayers hold		Swing		

=== Dagenham South ===
Dagenham South
Party	Candidate	Votes	%	±%
Labour	A. Chorley	Unopposed		
Labour	C. Hermitage	Unopposed		
Labour hold				
Labour hold				

=== Dagenham North East ===
Dagenham North East
Party	Candidate	Votes	%	±%
Labour	L. Evans	Unopposed		
Labour	R. Minchin	Unopposed		
Labour hold				
Labour hold				

=== Dagenham North West ===
Dagenham North West
Party	Candidate	Votes	%	±%
Labour	W. Legon	Unopposed		
Labour	M. Marley	Unopposed		
Labour hold				
Labour hold				
