= 1930 Dagenham Urban District Council election =

1930 UK local government election

- 5 April 1930

7 of 23 seats to the Dagenham Urban District Council 12 seats needed for a majority
	First party	Second party
	LAB	IND
Party	Labour	Independent
Seats before	18	6
Seats won	6	1
Seats after	18	6
Seat change	Steady	Steady
Majority party before election
Labour
Majority party after election
Labour

The fifth election to Dagenham Urban District Council took place on 5 April 1930.

== Background ==
In 1930 seven of the seats were up for re-election:

- Becontree Heath, 3 seats (out of 8)
- Chadwell Heath, 1 seat (out of 5)
- Dagenham, 3 seats (out of 10)

Polling took place on 5 April 1930.

== Results ==
The results were as follows:

=== Becontree Heath ===
Becontree Heath
Party	Candidate	Votes	%	±%
Labour	Charles Dellow (Note: Charles Dellow was previously elected for a three-year term in 1927.)	1,412		
Labour	Sarah Phillips	1,303		
Labour	William Langlois (Note: William Langlois was previously elected for a one-year term in 1929.)	1,284		
Independent	Franklin Gould	387		
Independent	Charles Hunt	381		
Turnout				
Labour hold		Swing		
Labour hold		Swing		
Labour hold		Swing		

=== Chadwell Heath ===
Chadwell Heath
Party	Candidate	Votes	%	±%
Independent	Henry Dyer	1,251		
Labour	Alfred Chorley	416		
Turnout				
Independent hold		Swing		

=== Dagenham ===
Dagenham
Party	Candidate	Votes	%	±%
Labour	Henry Hill (Note: Henry Hill was previously elected for a three-year term in 1927.)	1,473		
Labour	Mary Rothwell (Note: Mary Rothwell was previously elected for a three-year term in 1927.)	1,462		
Labour	Alfred Rodgers (Note: Alfred Rodgers was previously elected for a one-year term in 1929.)	1,451		
Independent	John Alderson	1,126		
Independent	Charles Bolton-Clark	1,098		
Independent	George Coppen	1,089		
Independent	William Bolton	217		
Communist	William Hall	92		
Communist	Jacob Goldberg	51		
Turnout				
Labour hold		Swing		
Labour hold		Swing		
Labour hold		Swing		
