= 1926 Dagenham Urban District Council election =

1926 UK local government election

- 26 March 1926

All 16 seats to the Dagenham Urban District Council 9 seats needed for a majority
	First party	Second party
	LAB	IND
Party	Labour	Independent
Seats won	8	8
Seats after	8	8
Majority party after election
NOC

The first election to Dagenham Urban District Council took place on 26 March 1926, ahead of the creation of the new urban district on 1 April 1926.

== Background ==
The number of councillors elected for each ward were:

- Becontree Heath, 5 seats
- Chadwell Heath, 5 seats
- Dagenham, 6 seats

Nominations closed on 12 March 1926 and polling took place on 26 March 1926.

== Results ==
The results were as follows:

=== Becontree Heath ===
Becontree Heath (5)
Party	Candidate	Votes	%	±%
Independent	Herbert Amies	623		
Independent	George Coppen	493		
Independent	G. Buzzacott	487		
Labour	Mary Morris	476		
Labour	Charles Dellow	426		
Independent	Murrel	424		
Independent	Roman	396		
Independent	Shaw	384		
Independent	G. Smith	368		
Labour	Winslade	363		
Labour	Wale	361		
Labour	Barson	359		
Labour	W. Peters	303		
Turnout				
Independent win (new seat)				
Independent win (new seat)				
Independent win (new seat)				
Labour win (new seat)				
Labour win (new seat)				

=== Chadwell Heath ===
Chadwell Heath (5)
Party	Candidate	Votes	%	±%
Independent	Arthur Reeve	734		
Independent	Percival Ashton	643		
Independent	James Tyler	640		
Independent	G. Smith	636		
Independent	C. Knight	620		
Labour	Carman	423		
Labour	Kennedy	396		
Labour	W. Podmore	384		
Turnout				
Independent win (new seat)				
Independent win (new seat)				
Independent win (new seat)				
Independent win (new seat)				
Independent win (new seat)				

=== Dagenham ===
Dagenham (6)
Party	Candidate	Votes	%	±%
Labour	William Gray	977		
Labour	Herbert Parry	976		
Labour	Carroll	880		
Labour	J. Murphy	852		
Labour	Stevens	851		
Labour	Henry Hill	846		
Independent	Gunary	836		
Independent	Bailey	822		
Independent	West	792		
Independent	Earl	763		
Independent	Horton	753		
Independent	Williams	728		
Turnout				
Labour win (new seat)				
Labour win (new seat)				
Labour win (new seat)				
Labour win (new seat)				
Labour win (new seat)				
Labour win (new seat)				
