= 1933 Dagenham Urban District Council election =

1933 UK local government election

- 1 April 1933

7 of 23 seats to the Dagenham Urban District Council 12 seats needed for a majority
	First party	Second party
	LAB	RA
Party	Labour	Ratepayers
Seats before	17	7
Seats won	6	1
Seats after	17	7
Seat change	Steady	Steady
Majority party before election
Labour
Majority party after election
Labour

The eighth election to Dagenham Urban District Council took place on 1 April 1933. The ratepayers' associations put forward a full slate of candidates for the second year in a row, but made no gains. The new People's Party was set up by Augustus Gibbs, who had previously been a Labour Party member, but was unable to gain any seats. Gibbs resigned from the council after the election, which triggered a by-election in the Dagenham ward in May. Another by-election took place in Chadwell Heath ward in September, following the resignation of James Tyler.

== Background ==
In 1933 seven of the seats were up for re-election:

- Becontree Heath, 3 seats (out of 8)
- Chadwell Heath, 1 seat (out of 5)
- Dagenham, 3 seats (out of 10)

The seats were last contested three years prior at the election in 1930.

Nominations closed on 18 March 1933 and polling took place on 1 April 1933.

As at the election the previous year, the ratepayers' associations for the three wards put forward a full slate of candidates. Augustus Gibbs, elected in 1932 as a Labour Party candidate, had broken away from the Labour group on the council to form the new People's Party and stood candidates in this election. The residents association in Becontree Heath ward—the Manor Farm Residents' Association—put forward a candidate.

== Results ==
The results were as follows:

=== Becontree Heath ===
Becontree Heath
Party	Candidate	Votes	%	±%
Labour	William Langlois (Note: William Langlois was previously elected for a three-year term in 1930.)	1,302		
Labour	Herbert Lyons	1,280		
Labour	Samuel Brighton	1,266		
Ratepayers	Pamela Fisher	836		
Ratepayers	George Peters	309		
Ratepayers	Charles Townley-Fullam	294		
Communist	James Lambert	165		
Communist	Frank Hembrow	133		
Communist	Edward Clarke	120		
People's Party	Frederick Richardson	76		
Residents	Albert Grenn (Note: Albert Grenn stood for the Manor Farm Residents' Association)	18		
Turnout				
Labour hold		Swing		
Labour hold		Swing		
Labour hold		Swing		

=== Chadwell Heath ===
Chadwell Heath
Party	Candidate	Votes	%	±%
Ratepayers	Henry Dyer	799		
Labour	Thomas Harper	214		
Turnout				
Ratepayers hold		Swing		

=== Dagenham ===
Dagenham
Party	Candidate	Votes	%	±%
Labour	John Preston	1,418		
Labour	Mary Rothwell (Note: Mary Rothwell was previously elected for a three-year term in 1930.)	1,397		
Labour	Alfred Rogers (Note: Alfred Rogers was previously elected for a three-year term in 1930.)	1,368		
Ratepayers	James Lamb	760		
Ratepayers	George Coppen	718		
Ratepayers	Robert Ward	601		
Communist	William Bolton	219		
Communist	Laurence Fawbert	168		
Communist	James Scanlan	161		
People's Party	M. Gibbs	265		
People's Party	Arthur Young	163		
People's Party	Charles Smith	144		
Independent	D. Hudson	39		
Independent	Philip Janson	37		
Independent	George Tate	26		
Turnout				
Labour hold		Swing		
Labour hold		Swing		
Labour hold		Swing		

== By-elections ==
=== Dagenham ===
The by-election took place on 18 May 1933, following the resignation of Augustus Gibbs.

1933 Dagenham ward by-election
Party	Candidate	Votes	%	±%
Labour	Reginald Minchin	715		
Ratepayers	James Lamb	599		
Communist	James Scanlan	106		
Registered electors		20,397		
Turnout				
Labour hold		Swing		

=== Chadwell Heath ===
The by-election took place on 22 September 1933, following the resignation of James Tyler. H. Atkinson and Eric Howard were both members of the Chadwell Heath Ratepayer' Association. After H. Atkinson was chosen as the ratepayers' candidate, Eric Howard decided to also stand as an independent candidate.

1933 Chadwell Heath ward by-election
Party	Candidate	Votes	%	±%
Ratepayers	H. Atkinson	779		
Independent	Eric Howard	310		
Labour	A. Chorley	171		
Turnout				
Ratepayers hold		Swing		
