= 1938 Dagenham Borough Council election =

1938 UK local government election

- 1 November 1938

All 24 seats to the Dagenham Borough Council 13 seats needed for a majority
	First party	Second party	Third party
	LAB	RA	ILAB
Party	Labour	Ratepayers	Independent Labour
Seats won	19	3	2
Majority party after election
Labour

The first election to the Dagenham Borough Council took place on 1 November 1938. The election was for all 24 seats on the council. It was the last regular election ahead of the Second World War and there would not be another election until 1945.

== Background ==
Dagenham was incorporated as municipal borough on 1 October 1938. There had already been an election to the urban district council in April 1938, but as municipal boroughs held elections annually in November another election was required that year.

In 1938 all 24 of the seats were up for election:

- Becontree, 3 seats
- Becontree Heath, 3 seats
- Chadwell Heath, 3 seats
- Dagenham North East, 6 seats
- Dagenham North West, 3 seats
- Dagenham South, 6 seats

Nominations closed on 22 October 1938 and polling took place on 1 November 1938.

Councillors were elected for one, two or three year terms due to end in 1939, 1940 and 1941. However, due to the Second World War, and the provisions of the Local Elections and Register of Electors (Temporary Provisions) Acts 1939–1944 and the Representation of the People Act 1945, their terms were extended until the 1945, 1946 and 1947 elections.

== Results ==
The results were as follows:

=== Becontree ===
Becontree
Party	Candidate	Votes	%	±%
Labour	A. Banks (Note: Member of the Dagenham Urban District Council immediately before the election.)	Unopposed		
Labour	A. Thomas	Unopposed		
Labour	F. Thomas	Unopposed		
Labour win (new seat)				
Labour win (new seat)				
Labour win (new seat)				

=== Becontree Heath ===
Becontree Heath
Party	Candidate	Votes	%	±%
Labour	F. Brown	Unopposed		
Labour	E. Hennem	Unopposed		
Labour	S. Reddy	Unopposed		
Labour win (new seat)				
Labour win (new seat)				
Labour win (new seat)				

=== Chadwell Heath ===
Chadwell Heath
Party	Candidate	Votes	%	±%
Ratepayers	E. Osborne	1,149		
Ratepayers	F. Grindrod	1,098		
Ratepayers	J. Andrews	960		
Labour	A. Crocombe	780		
Labour	A. Bennett	690		
Labour	L. Bennett	655		
Turnout				
Ratepayers win (new seat)				
Ratepayers win (new seat)				
Ratepayers win (new seat)				

=== Dagenham South ===
Dagenham South
Party	Candidate	Votes	%	±%
Labour	E. Brown	Unopposed		
Labour	R. Clark	Unopposed		
Labour	C. Hermitage	Unopposed		
Labour	W. Markham	Unopposed		
Labour	J. Neish	Unopposed		
Labour	A. Rogers	Unopposed		
Labour win (new seat)				
Labour win (new seat)				
Labour win (new seat)				
Labour win (new seat)				
Labour win (new seat)				
Labour win (new seat)				

=== Dagenham North East ===
Dagenham North East
Party	Candidate	Votes	%	±%
Independent Labour	R. Gibbs	1,902		
Independent Labour	R. Murrell	1,735		
Labour	J. Burridge	1,067		
Labour	L. Evans	1,063		
Labour	T. Cain	1,061		
Labour	W. Bellamy	995		
Labour	A. Dolder	964		
Labour	W. Langlois	791		
Turnout				
Independent Labour win (new seat)				
Independent Labour win (new seat)				
Labour win (new seat)				
Labour win (new seat)				
Labour win (new seat)				
Labour win (new seat)				

=== Dagenham North West ===
Dagenham North West
Party	Candidate	Votes	%	±%
Labour	W. Legon	Unopposed		
Labour	M. Marley	Unopposed		
Labour	C. Thorneycroft	Unopposed		
Labour win (new seat)				
Labour win (new seat)				
Labour win (new seat)				
