= Municipal Borough of Dagenham =

Former local government area in the UK

Coordinates: 51.5609°N 0.1556°E

Dagenham
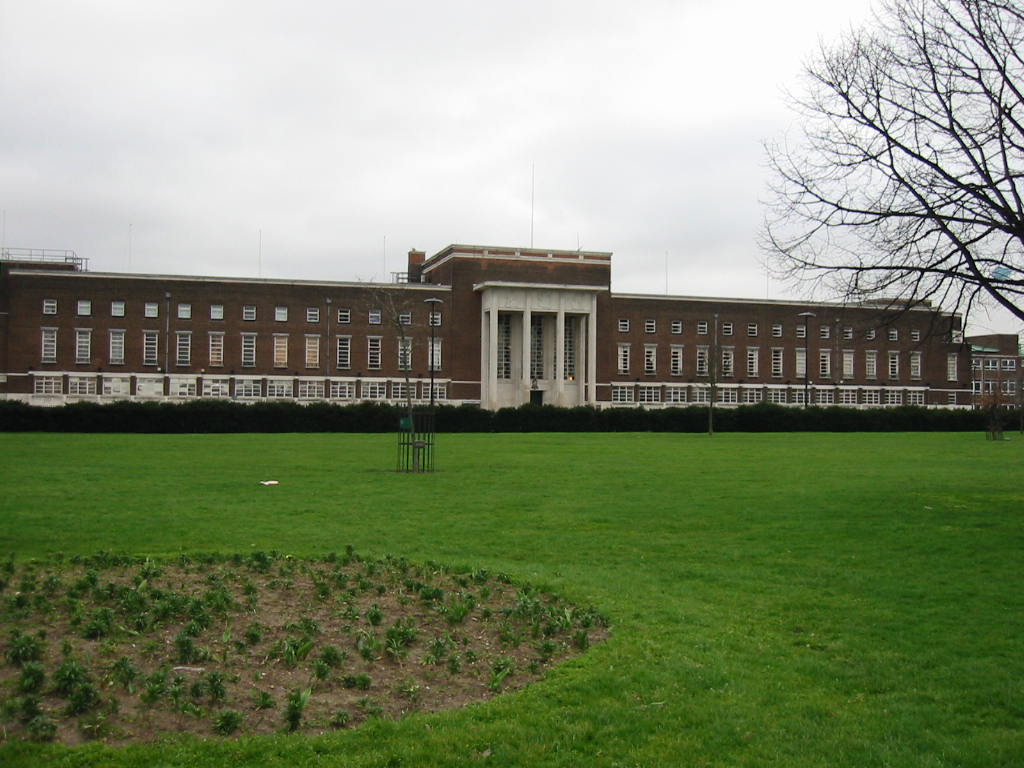
- Dagenham Civic Centre

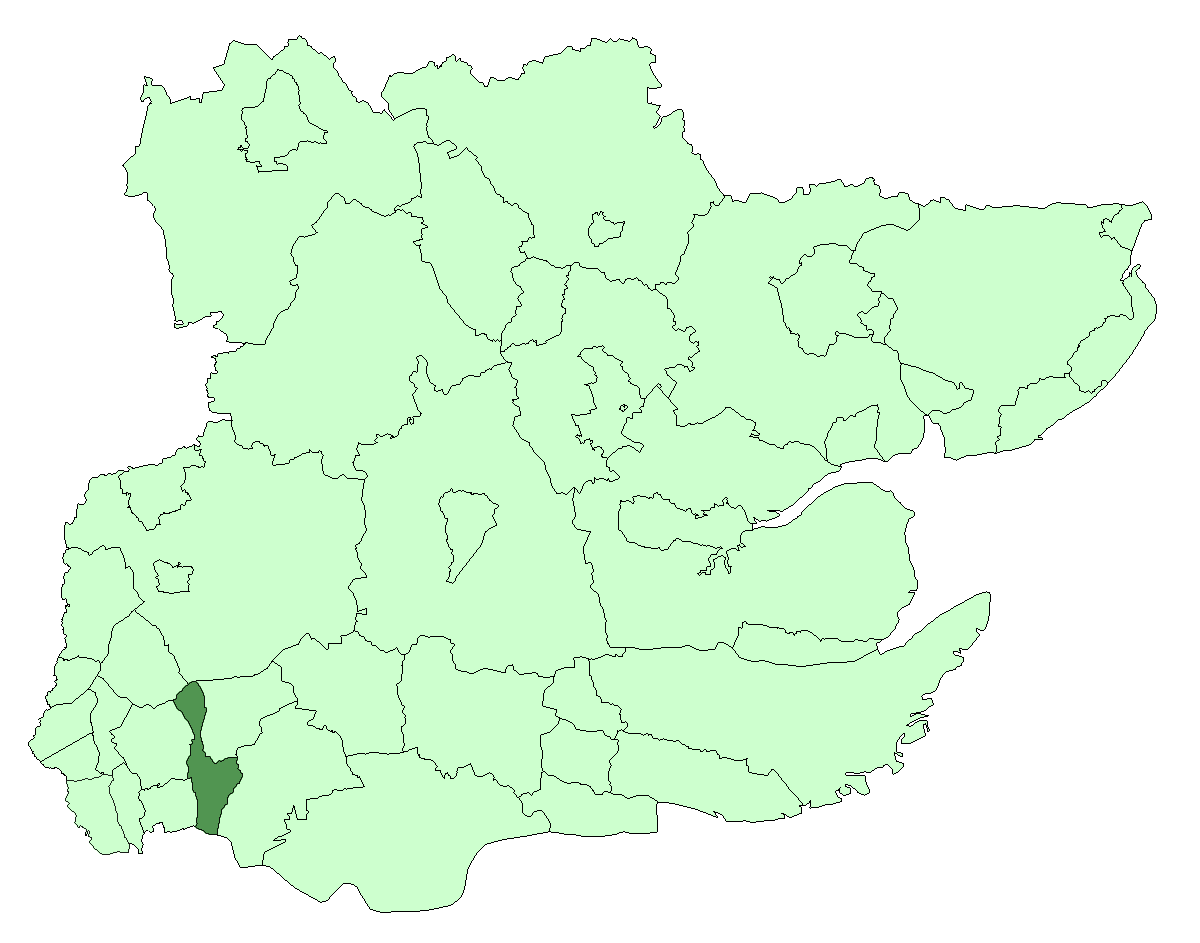
- Dagenham within Essex in 1961
- Area
  - 1931/1951: 6,554 acres (26.52 km^{2})
  - 1961: 6,565 acres (26.57 km^{2})
- Population
  - 1931: 89,362
  - 1951: 114,568
  - 1961: 108,368
- Density
  - 1931: 14/acre
  - 1951: 17/acre
  - 1961: 16/acre
- History
  - Origin: Dagenham parish
  - Created: 1926
  - Abolished: 1965
  - Succeeded by: London Borough of Barking; London Borough of Redbridge
- Status: Civil parish Urban district (until 1938); Municipal borough (after 1938)
- Government: Dagenham Urban District Council; Dagenham Borough Council
  - HQ: Valence House (until 1937); Becontree Heath (after 1937)
  - Motto: Judge us by our deeds
- Coat of arms of Dagenham Borough Council

Dagenham was a local government district in south west Essex, England from 1926 to 1965 covering the parish of Dagenham. Initially created as an urban district, it was incorporated as a municipal borough in 1938. It was established to deal with the increase in population and the change from rural to urban area caused by the building of the Becontree estate by the London County Council and the subsequent movement of people from Inner London. Peripheral to London, the district formed part of the Metropolitan Police District and London Traffic Area. It now forms the eastern sections of the London Borough of Barking and Dagenham and the London Borough of Redbridge in Greater London.

== History ==
=== Background ===
Dagenham parish formed part of Romford Rural District from 1894. In 1920 it was suggested the parish should be removed from the rural district and its area divided between Ilford Urban District and Barking Town Urban District, because of the dramatic rise in population caused by the change in use of land from mostly farming to the large scale suburban housing development of the Becontree estate. Instead the urban district was created in 1926 from the parish of Dagenham.

=== Merger with Barking ===
A move was mooted in 1929 to either combine Dagenham with Barking and Ilford (the three districts to contain parts of the Becontree estate), or for Dagenham to gain part of Barking; but it was not acted upon. The district became part of the London Passenger Transport Area from 1933.

The borough was considered to form part of the Greater London Conurbation, as defined by the Registrar General. The Royal Commission on Local Government in Greater London considered the district for inclusion in Greater London and in 1965 it was abolished by the London Government Act 1963, with its former area transferred to Greater London from Essex, to be combined with parts of other districts, including Barking, to form the London Borough of Barking (now known as the London Borough of Barking and Dagenham). The northern tip of the protrusion northwards towards Chigwell became part of the London Borough of Redbridge along with the south eastern part of Chigwell Urban District.

== Geography ==
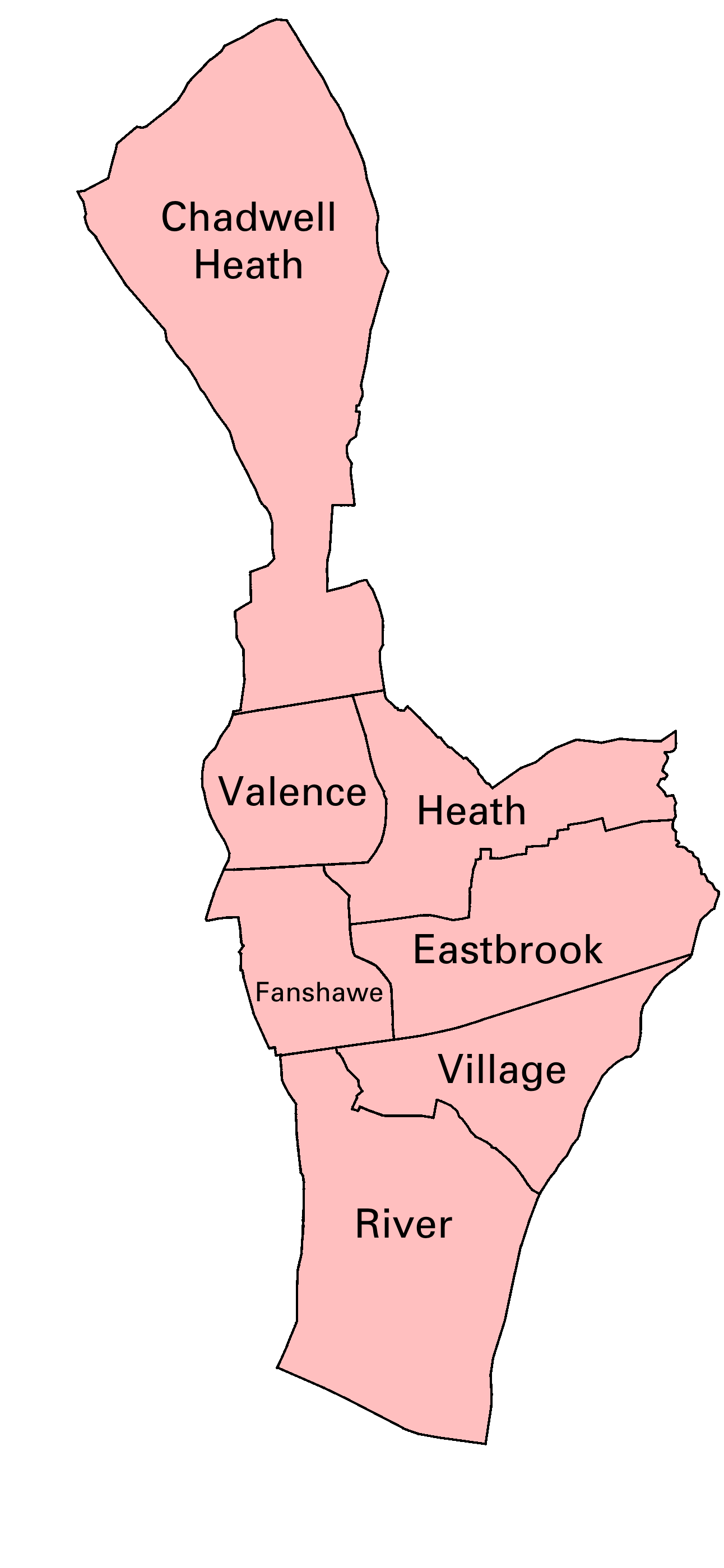
The electoral wards used in the municipal borough.

The parish and district included a long protrusion northwards to include Chadwell Heath, Marks Gate, Hog Hill and part of Hainault Forest, and formed a boundary with Chigwell.

== Dagenham Urban District Council ==
The council was first elected on 26 March 1926, replacing Dagenham Parish Council from 1 April. The parish was divided into the three wards of Becontree Heath (5 seats), Chadwell Heath (5 seats) and Dagenham (6 seats).

=== Civic buildings ===
Initially the urban district council was based in Valence House, which was owned by the London County Council and had been used by the parish council. The purchase of the building, with the grounds included as a gift, was agreed in 1926. To replace this temporary accommodation, the council built the Civic Centre which was designed in art deco style. The building officially opened in 1937. It is located at Becontree Heath, the ancient meeting place of the Becontree hundred. The first stone was ceremonially put in place in 1936 by Lord Snell, Chairman of the London County Council.

=== List of chairmen ===
The chairman of the council was a position first established in 1926 with the creation of the urban district council. In 1938, Dagenham was incorporated as a municipal borough and the role was replaced by the Mayor of Dagenham.

No.	Chairman	Took office	Left office	Party	Ref.
1	Arthur Reeve	1926	1927	Independent	
2	William Gray	1927	1928	Labour	
3	Stanley Coppen	1928	1929	Labour	
4	Charles Dellow	1929	1930	Labour	
5	Henry Hill	1930	1931	Labour	
6	Herbert Parry	1931	1932	Labour	
7	Mary Rothwell (Note: Mary Rothwell was the first female chairman of the council.)	1932	1933	Labour	
8	William Markham	1933	1934	Labour	
9	William Langlois	1934	1935	Labour	
10	John Preston	1935	1936	Labour	
11	Lily Evans	1936	1937	Labour	
12	Alfred Rogers	1937	1938	Labour	
13	Alfred Chorley (Note: Alfred Chorley was also the charter mayor (first mayor) of the Municipal Borough of Dagenham.)	1938	1938	Labour	

== Dagenham Borough Council ==
Dagenham was incorporated as a municipal borough on 1 October 1938 and the first election took place on 1 November 1938.

The council exercised its right to be an excepted district, locally responsible for education, under the Education Act 1944.

== Population ==
The population of the parish grew considerably after the building of the Becontree estate from 1921; it peaked in 1951. The introduction of industrial use such as the Ford Motor Company factory led to further increases in population.

Year	1861	1871	1881	1891	1901	1911	1921	1931	1951	1961
Population	2,708	2,879	3,411	4,324	6,091	7,930	9,127	89,362	114,568	108,368
