= History of the National Front (UK) =

The history of the National Front, a far-right political party in the United Kingdom, began in 1967, when it was founded by A. K. Chesterton.

== Late 1960s: formation ==
The National Front was established as a coalition of small extreme-right groups which were active on the fringes of British politics during the 1960s. These were the British National Party (BNP), the League of Empire Loyalists (LEL), the Racial Preservation Society (RPS), the Greater Britain Movement (GBM), and some branches of the Anglo-Rhodesian Society. Many in these parties were experiencing growing frustration at their powerlessness.

The LEL's leader A. K. Chesterton was concerned that the Monday Club, a newly established group on the hard right of the Conservative Party, would take some of the support away from his LEL. After returning from his holiday in South Africa in early 1966 Chesterton resolved to unite various right-wing groups. Over the following months many members of Britain's extreme-right visited him at his Croydon apartment to discuss the proposal. Among these visitors were John Tyndall and Martin Webster of the Greater Britain Movement, Colin Jordan of the National Socialist Movement, and David Brown of the Racial Preservation Society. Chesterton believed that it would be political suicide to unite with Jordan and his group because of their overt Neo-Nazi agenda. He was also cautious about Brown, believing that he deemed his RLP to be too important, and that Brown wanted "everything handed over lock, stock and barrel" to him. In principle, everyone agreed with the idea of unification, but there were many personal rivalries that made the process difficult. Chesterton instead saw the BNP, and in particular its more moderate figures Andrew Fountaine and Philip Maxwell, as a viable option to unite with. A faction of the RLP, led by Robin Beauclair, also agreed to join the venture. The BLP was eager to accelerate the process of integration, in part because it was running out of funds and hoped that the LEL could help to financially sustain it.

Independent of Chesterton, Tyndall also supported the concept of unification, proposing the idea of a merger between his GBM and the LEL. In the spring of 1966 he and seven other GBM members were arrested for the possession of weapons. This resulted in many other right-wingers seeking to distance themselves from him and his organisation. In September 1966, the BNP and RPS agreed to a merger between their two groups, to establish the National Democratic Party. As part of this agreement they stipulated that they would avoid involvement with Tyndall and his GBM. Brown's insistence that he be the new group's sole leader caused dissent and the proposed merger foundered within a week.

Chesterton and the BNP agreed that Tyndall and the GBM would not be invited to join their new party. According to Chesterton, the GBM's "past utterances on anti-semitism and pro-Nazism would most certainly not be part" of the new party's policies. Various names for the new party were mooted, with the options including the "National Independence Party" and the "British Front". In December 1966 they agreed on the name "National Front". At the LEL's annual conference in October 1966, at which BNP were in attendance, it was agreed that a working committee to investigate which policies the two parties could agree upon. The LEL's secretary, Austen Brooks, became the committee's chairman. The working committee met twice a month between November 1966 and February 1967. The BNP did not push for the adoption of its preferred policies, aware that with its numerical superiority it would dominate the new party and thus could change any policies it disagreed with at a later date. Its initial policies revolved around opposition to the political establishment, anti-communism, support for Rhodesia and the white dominions, and both an end to immigration into Britain and the repatriation of all settled immigrants to their ancestral nations.

== Early 1970s: growth ==
The National Front was officially established on 7 February 1967, with Chesterton as its first chairman. On its foundation it had approximately 2500 members, 1000 of which had come from the BNP, 300 from the LEL, and over 100 from the RPS. In his study of the NF, the journalist Martin Walker noted that "for the great union of the Right, the National Front was a feeble beginning". According to Thurlow, the formation of the NF was "the most significant event on the radical right and fascist fringe of British politics" since the internment of the country's fascists during the Second World War. The first year of the party's existence was marked by a power struggle between the LEL and BNP factions. The former LEL were frustrated by the behaviour of many in the former BNP, such as their propensity for chanting. Chesterton emphasised the idea that the NF should be an elite movement, something perceived as a rebuke to many ex-BNP members, who began calling him "the Schoolmaster". With Chesterton escaping the British winter by holidaying in South Africa each year, the LEL gradually became less influential within the NF.

The majority of the BNP had hoped and expected that Tyndall and his GBM would join them in the NF, and on taking power of the party they called for this to happen. In June 1967, Tyndall then told the 138 GBM members that his organisation was being "discontinued" and that as individuals they should join the NF. Tyndall had written a book titled Six Principles of British Nationalism in which he had espoused more moderate positions than those he previously promoted; he believed that this was the most important factor in Chesterton changing his mind on GBM membership. Chesterton then publicly welcomed Tyndall and the GBM as members, contravening his earlier commitment to keeping those associated with Neo-Nazism away from the NF.

The party held its first annual conference in October 1967, when it was picketed by anti-fascist demonstrators. In January 1968 the Liverpool-based British Aid for the Repatriation of Immigrants joined the NF, to be followed later that year by another Liverpudlian group, the People's Progressive Party. In 1969, the NF gained further recruits from the Anglo-Rhodesian League and the Anti-Communist League. In March 1971 the Manchester branch of the National Democratic Party (NDP) defected to the NF, and In December 1971 they were joined by the Newcastle Democratic Movement. Although there were discussions of a potential merger with the NDP in September 1970, the NF Directorate ultimately refused to endorse this.

=== Challenges to Chesterton ===
In 1968, Chesterton's leadership was challenged by ex-BNP member Andrew Fountaine, who was backed by Gerald Kemp and Rodney Legg. A leadership election produced a strong mandate for Chesterton and his challengers left the party. Throughout this, Tyndall had remained loyal to Chesterton. There was further arguments in the party after the lease ended on their Westminster HQ. LEL members wanted another base in Central London, while the GBM and BNP factions favoured moving to the former GBM's HQ, the "Nationalist Centre" in Tulse Hill. Chesterton backed the LEL position and rented a small office in Fleet Street. In March 1968, the NF stood in the Acton by-election, securing 5.5% of the vote, likely drawing upon concerns regarding the recent arrival of Kenyan Asians into Britain.

In April 1968, the Conservative Party politician Enoch Powell made his Rivers of Blood speech, a populist appeal against non-white immigration into Britain, which helped make immigration the foremost political topic in the country's media. Powell used language similar to that of the NF, although proposed policies that were more moderate than those espoused by the latter; in contrast to the Front's calls for the compulsory removal of non-white migrants from the UK, Powell instead advocated a voluntary system of repatriation. Tyndall believed that Powell's speech would benefit the NF more than the Conservatives, and a growing number of individuals on the right wing of the Conservative Party defected to the NF. The NF sought to capitalise on this by organising a training scheme in autumn 1968 in which branch officers and group organisers met at Tyndall's Nationalist Centre to learn skills in public speaking, propaganda, and branch organisation. Conversely, the NF also feared losing some of its members to hard right elements of the Conservatives, such as the Monday Club. The NF also supported the infiltration of Conservative branches, in the belief that this could help to undermine the party as a whole.

In the 1969 local elections, the NF fielded 45 candidates, averaging 8%, with a few of their candidates securing over 10%. They focused on these latter seats in the 1970 local elections, fielding 10 candidates, although almost all secured under 5%. In the 1970 general election, it contested nine seats and attracted an average of 3.7%, with its best result being in Islington North, where it gained 5.6%. It is likely that much of the support that the NF desired had instead gone to the Conservatives, who (influenced by Powell) had promoted a tougher stance on immigration in their campaign. The party had faced militant left opposition, including a lorry that was driven into their Tulse Hill building in 1969, and to counter this the NF installed a spy in the London anti-fascist movement. Against Chesterton's wishes, NF activists began carrying out stunts to raise publicity for them; in December 1968 they marched on a London Weekend television show uninvited and in spring 1969 assaulted two Labour Party ministers at a public meeting, thus accruing a reputation for rowdiness. While Chesterton was in South Africa, a faction led by Gordon Brown launched a leadership challenge against him. On realising that his support was weak, Chesterton resigned.

In the 1970 local elections, the NF fielded 84 candidates, averaging 5.2% of the vote.

=== O'Brien's leadership: 1971–72 ===
Brown offered the party's leadership to Tyndall, but the latter declined the offer. Tyndall instead endorsed John O'Brien, a Powellite who had contacts across Britain's far-right. The NF directorate was unconvinced but with no alternative selected O'Brien in February 1971. With Chesterton gone, the party's directorate restructured the party's constitutional procedures away from a more autocratic leadership. It also divided the party directorate into sub-committees, each responsible for overseeing one of its different aspects.

O'Brien and his supporters soon grew frustrated with Tyndall and Walker's continuing friendship with German Neo-Nazi groups and their links with the Northern League. He called on the directorate to expel Walker from the party, claiming that he brought it into disrepute, although was out-voted. In protest at O'Brien's actions, Tyndall offered his resignation from the position of Vice Chairman before then revoking that. In June 1972, O'Brien and his allies left the party and joined John Davis' National Independence Party, taking the NF's membership with them.

== Tyndall's leadership (1972-1974) ==
"It should be the pride of all NF members to be called extremists and not only that - it should be a matter of guilt to any person opposed to the Left that he is not labelled as extreme."

— John Tyndall

With O'Brien gone, Tyndall assumed the position of party chairman in July 1972. He immediately centralised the party's activities at its new headquarters in Croydon. According to the historian of fascism Richard Thurlow, under Tyndall the NF represented "an attempt to portray the essentials of Nazi ideology in more rational language and seemingly reasonable arguments", functioning as an attempt to "convert racial populists" angry about immigration "into fascists".

In 1972, the Ugandan Asians were expelled from Uganda by its president, Idi Amin, with the British government offering these refugees sanctuary in the UK. The NF capitalised on this issue, campaigning against these new arrivals. As well as opposing this new wave of immigration and exploiting the hostility toward Prime Minister Edward Heath that it had generated, they also used this issue to argue that black Africans were unfit to govern themselves and had been better off under European colonial rule. The NF engaged in a number of rallies and street marches focused on protesting the arrival of the Ugandan Asians. The controversy surrounding the issue and the publicity generated by the NF resulted in a rapid growth of the party's membership. Among those who joined were a number of Monday Club members who brought with them much political experience. Tyndall used the opportunity to launch an appeal for greater funds, with the intent on employing full-time regional organisers.

In 1973, the NF began to shift towards an attempt to secure greater support among Britain's white working-class. To do so it embraced a range of leftist economic policies and oriented itself along a more populist programme. It handed out NF leaflets to striking workers at a number of factories, encouraging them to join the party. In June 1974, the party launched its NF Trade Unionists Association, seeking to promote NF membership among Britain's trade unions. The British Left recognised the threat that this posed and fought back by publicising the Neo-Nazi past of many of the NF's senior members. As part of this they published photographs taken in the 1960s of Tyndall dressed in a Nazi-style uniform. This damaged the status of both Tyndall and Webster in the party, particularly among its new members.

The NF's first dramatic by-election result came in the 1972 Uxbridge by-election, where its candidate John Clifton polled 8.2% of the vote. In the 1973 West Bromwich by-election the party fielded Webster as its candidate and gained 16% of the vote; the NF had passed the 10% threshold and had its electoral deposit returned for the first time. For the party, this was an electoral breakthrough and brought them greater attention and media coverage. In the 1973 general election, the party did well in two Blackburn wards, gaining 23% and 16.8% respectively. It also stood six candidates for that year's Greater London Council election, gaining an average vote of 6.3%; this rose to 11.4% in Feltham and Heston. The NF's leaders were surprised at these nationwide results, having believed that they would have done better.

In 1973, the NF agreed that when the next general election was called, they would field a minimum of fifty candidates, thus ensuring that they would be granted a free party political broadcast. In the subsequent February 1974 general election, they fielded 54 candidates, ensuring that they could have a party election broadcast. As it was contesting almost six times as many seats as it had in 1970, it gained over six times the number of votes in 1970; this amounted to 77,000 votes. The average vote share in contested seats was 3.2%, slightly less than it had received in 1970. The NF failed to have any of its electoral deposits returned, something that was a bitter disappointment to many in the party. In West Bromwich, where they had gained 16% of the vote in the previous year's by-election, the NF only secured 7%. In the ensuing October 1974 general election, the NF fielded 90 candidates. Although it increased its average vote by 0.3%, all of its candidates failed to secure 10% of the vote and lost their deposits.

During the 1970s it also encouraged members to infiltrate other groups, such as the Hunt Saboteurs Association and ratepayers' and residents' associations.

"Paki-bashing", a form of racist violence against Pakistanis and other South Asians, peaked during the 1970s–1980s, with many of the attackers often being members or supporters of the National Front.

=== Read's leadership (1974-1976) ===
Over a number of years a faction under the leadership of Roy Painter had emerged within the party, coming to be known as the "Populists". The Populist faction was angry that the NF Directorate was dominated by former members of the BNP and GBM, claiming that this was not representative of the wider movement. The Populists also believed that Tyndall had not really moved away from his old Neo-Nazi beliefs. The Populists then backed John Kingsley Read as a replacement for Tyndall, and the Directorate subsequently elected him. Tyndall was then able to get elected Vice Chairman. A level of civil war then developed within the party between the Populists and the Tyndallites. The Tyndallites accused the Populists of having left-wing sympathies, with five senior members of the NF in Kent signing a document alleging that the Populists had links to a leftist columnist for The Guardian. The Populists accused the Tyndallite faction of being dominated by homosexuals, pejoratively referring to it as "the Daisy Chain" and "the Fairy Ring". At the party's 1974 AGM, Tyndall was booed by the Populists, who jeered the words "Nazi! Nazi!" at him.

By the mid-1970s, the NF's membership had stagnated and in several areas was declining. In the 1975 local elections they fielded 60 candidates, far less than in previous elections, with only five gaining over 10% of the vote. Focusing its efforts on the anti-EEC campaign, in March 1975 it requested affiliation with the National Referendum Campaign, which was campaigning for the UK to leave the EEC in that year's referendum, although the latter turned down the offer. In response, NF members disrupted the April 1975 NRC meeting at Conway Hall, storming the platform and having to be removed by police.

Tyndall attacked the Populists and called for constitutional reform in the party. In doing so he launched personal attacks on many prominent Populists. This resulted in the NF directorate holding a vote of no confidence to which no-one—even close Tyndall allies like Webster—opposed. Following the vote, Read contemplated expelling Tyndall from the party, but held off for the moment. At the October 1975 AGM, Tyndall tried to get his proposed constitutional reforms passed, but failed. Despite the efforts of the Tyndallites, Read was narrowly re-elected as the party's chairman. Read then announced an internal inquiry into the Tyndallites' seizure and occupation of the Croydon HQ. In November, Tyndall, Webster, and Fountaine were brought before a disciplinary hearing for their seizure. Read had called for Tyndall to be expelled and the other two suspended, although the move was defeated by the party directorate. Read, Richard Lawson, and Carl Lane then held a private meeting of the executive committee, unanimously voting to suspend Tyndall and nine of his supporters on the directorate. At the next meeting of the directorate, which was now dominated by the Populists, Tyndall was then expelled from the party. Tyndall took the issue of his expulsion to the High Court, where it was declared illegal by Justice Goulding on 20 December.

In December 1975, Read, Painter, Lawson, and Brown then split from the NF to form their own rival organisation, the National Party (NP). They took the NF's Croydon HQ—which had been purchased for the party by Brown—with them, however Tyndall and the NF Directorate secured a court order which declared that the building legally belonged to the NF and that the NP could not take control of it. The NP had hoped that the majority of the NF's membership would switch allegiances to themselves, however this did not happen. By the end of February, 29 branches and groups had defected to the NP, although 101 had remained loyal. Nevertheless, from 1975 onward the party entered a steady decline.

=== Tyndall's return (1976-1980) ===
In February 1976, Tyndall was restored as the NF leader. In 1976, the Front took advantage of the growing racial tensions within the country. After the Indian population of Malawi was expelled, many arrived as refugees to Britain, with the NF holding demonstrations to jeer at them in their arrival. In the 1976 local elections, the NF fielded 176 candidates, 80 of whom secured 10%. Its rival NP was more successful, getting two of its candidates elected in Blackburn.

"I do not believe that the survival of the white man will be found through the crest of political respectability because I believe that respectability today means one thing, it means your preparedness to be a lackey of the establishment ... I don't want respectability if that is what respectability means, preparedness to surrender my own race, to hell with respectability if that is what it is."

— Tyndall's views on electoral 'respectability'

Encouraged by Webster and new confidante Richard Verrall, in the mid-1970s Tyndall returned to his openly hardline approach of promoting biological racist and antisemitic ideas. This did not help the NF's electoral prospects. In the 1979 general election, the NF mounted the largest challenge of any insurgent party since Labour in 1918. In the election, it nevertheless "flopped dismally". By 1979, membership had fallen to approximately 5000. Tyndall nevertheless refused to dilute or moderate his party's policies, stating that to do so would be the "naïve chasing of moonbeams". In November 1979, Fountaine unsuccessfully tried to oust Tyndall as leader, subsequently establishing the National Front Constitutional Movement.

Tyndall had grown distant from Webster over a number of differences, and in the late 1970s began blaming him for the party's problems. Webster had for instance disagreed with Tyndall's support for Chesterton's leadership, while Tyndall was upset with Webster's attempts to encourage more skinheads and football hooligans to join the party. Tyndall in particular began critiquing Webster's homosexuality and the allegations that Webster had been making sexual advances toward young men in the party. More widely, he complained about a "homosexual network" among leading NF members. In October 1979 he called a meeting of the NF Directorate at which he urged them to call for Webster's resignation. At the meeting Webster apologised for his conduct, and the Directorate stood by him against Tyndall. Angered, Tyndall then tried convincing the Directorate to grant him greater powers in his position as Chairman, but they refused. Tyndall resigned in January 1980, subsequently referring to the party as the "gay National Front".

In June 1980, Tyndall founded the New National Front (NNF). This NNF claimed that a third of the NF's membership defected to join them. Tyndall stated that "I have one wish in this operation and one wish alone, to cleanse the National Front of the foul stench of perversion which has politically crippled it". As his choice of party name suggested, he remained hopeful that his breakaway group could eventually be re-merged back into the NF. There developed a great rivalry between the two groups, and as the NF's new leadership moved it away from the Tyndellite approach, Tyndall realised that he may never have the opportunity to regain his position within it.

== The Strasserite faction (1980s) ==
In 1983, Webster was ousted as the party's chair. In May 1985, the Strasserite faction secured controlled of the party's directorate and suspended the membership of its opponents. The Strasserites described themselves as "radical, youthful and successful", contrasting their approach with the "out-dated conservative policies" of their opponents, whom they claimed wanted the NF to be a "reactionary anti-immigrant pressure group". These opponents then formed their own organisation, which came to be known as the Flag Group after their newspaper, Flag; in January 1987 this group officially adopted the name of National Front. There would therefore remain two organisations claiming the name of National Front—that controlled by the Flag Group and the Official National Front run by the Strasserites—until early 1990. In contrast to the Strasserite NF's increased centralisation as a response to perceived state repression, the Flag Group gave autonomy to its branches, seeking to focus upon local issues.

The Strasserites officially reformulated their party along the centralised cadre system at the November 1986 AGM. They emphasised the ideology of the Third Position, which they presented as being opposed to both capitalism and Marxist-oriented socialism. They stated their support for "a broad front of racialists of all colours" who were seeking an end to multi-racial society and capitalism. In their publications they began promoting positive articles about black nationalism, claiming that they both had the common goal of global racial separatism. Nationalism Today began featuring positive articles about Louis Farrakhan, the Nation of Islam, and Marcus Garvey, and praising the governments of Libya and Iran, presenting them all as part of a global Third Position in international politics. In issue 99 of National Front News, the slogan "Fight Racism" was prominently featured, resulting in the party's Manchester branch refusing to distribute it. This new rhetoric and ideology alienated much of the NF's rank-and-file membership.

In 1989, Griffin, Holland, and Colin Todd split from the NF to establish their International Third Position group. In March 1990 the Official National Front was then disbanded by its leaders, Patrick Harrington, Graham Williamson, and David Kerr, who instead established a new group, the Third Way. This left the Flag Group as the only remaining group using the National Front banner.

== Later years ==
Following the Lansdowne Road football riot of 1995, which was caused by English far-right hooligans, the NF's Chairman Ian Anderson reformed the party as the National Democrats. A small faction broke away from this to form their own group, retaining the Nation Front name. Over the course of the 1990s, the NF was eclipsed by Tyndall's new British National Party as the foremost vehicle on the British far-right. The party contested the general elections in 1997 and 2001, but made little impact in either.

By 2001, the NF had developed close links with Combat 18, a neo-Nazi paramilitary which had been founded by the BNP before breaking from the latter. It continued to organise rallies, several of which were banned by successive Home Secretaries.

In February 2010, a High Court decision forced the BNP to remove the clause from its constitution prohibiting non-white membership. In response, the NF claimed to have received over 1,000 membership enquiries from BNP members and said that BNP branches in Yorkshire and Lincolnshire had discussed defecting. After the English Defence League (EDL), an Islamophobic social movement, emerged in 2009, the NF took an interest in its activities. It urged the EDL to move away from its "random anti‐Muslim protests" by politically organising behind the NF; the EDL, however, sought to distance itself from the Front and other older far-right groups. As the EDL declined in the following years, the NF collaborated with some of the street-based far-right protest groups that had split from it, like the North West Infidels and South East Alliance.

In March 2015 Kevin Bryan became party chair. After he was injured in a car accident, Bryan resigned and was replaced by Aberdeen-based Dave MacDonald in November 2015. Bryan retook his position before resigning in July 2018; Tony Martin became acting chair, before being appointed to the position full-time in September. In October, he and his girlfriend attracted press attention for posing for photographs with individuals dressed in Ku Klux Klan uniforms in Newtownards, Northern Ireland.

The Party has not put forward a single candidate in any elections since 2015, Not in 2017, 2019 or the 2024 elections.
