= Ian Anderson (British politician) =

British far-right politician

Ian Hugh Myddleton Anderson

Chairman of the National Democrats
- In office 1995–2011
- Preceded by: Position established
- Succeeded by: Position dissolved

Personal details
- Born: 1953 Hillingdon, London, England
- Died: 2 February 2011 (aged 57)
- Occupation: Politician
- Known for: Far-right activism
- Political party: National Front

Ian Hugh Myddleton Anderson (1953 – 2 February 2011) was a leading figure on the British far-right in the 1980s and 1990s.

== Biography ==
=== Early life ===
Anderson was born in Hillingdon in 1953. His involvement in politics began in the mid-1970s when he was close to certain elements on the right of the Conservative Party, particularly the Monday Club.

=== National Front ===
Anderson joined the National Front in the late 1970s and was initially seen as a supporter of National Organiser Martin Webster. However, when the Political Soldier faction, led by figures such as Nick Griffin and Derek Holland, moved against Webster and his assistant Michael Salt, Anderson sided with the rebels and used his casting vote to ensure that Webster and Salt were expelled for mismanagement.

Anderson became a close associate of Andrew Brons and, like Brons, largely indulged the Political Soldiers faction, writing for the Third Positionist party magazine Nationalism Today. He also played a leading role in working with Ian Stuart Donaldson to ensure that Rock Against Communism became the province of the NF rather than the British Movement. As Anderson grew in influence within the NF divisions between the faction led by Brons and himself and the Political Soldiers grew, as Anderson was a strong supporter of electoral participation. He became one of the leading figures grouped around the dissident Flag newspaper (edited by Martin Wingfield) and was expelled by the Official National Front along with the rest of his faction in 1986, reconstituting as the Flag Group. The divisions reached a crisis at the Vauxhall by-election in 1989, where an NF candidate for each faction stood (Patrick Harrington and Ted Budden), splitting support and haranguing one another on live TV as the declaration of votes was made. Anderson, nonetheless, became a powerful figure within the Flag Group and by 1990 was effective leader, Andrew Brons having left the political scene.

In 1987, Troy Southgate and Patrick Harrington, acting for the NF's Security and Intelligence Department (SID), photographed Anderson in Stratford, east London, when it was discovered that his printing business was housed in the same building as the offices of Searchlight, an anti-fascist organisation.

With the Official NF having split into the International Third Position and Third Way, Anderson gained control of the NF in 1990 and attempted to remodel the party back along the lines of John O'Brien in the early 1970s when they had appeared at one stage to be a potential threat to the mainstream parties. The spur for this was undoubtedly the success of the Front National. He had also attempted to gain contacts in the United States and in 1989 he had established a link with Richard Barrett and the Nationalist Movement with a pact known as the 'New Atlantic Charter'. Anderson's NF suffered however from the inactivity and in-fighting of the 1980s, whilst the emergence of the British National Party was also a major check on his ambitions as leader.

=== National Democrats ===
Anderson soon came to believe that the negative connotations of the National Front name were proving a bar to success and so in 1995 he relaunched the party as the National Democrats, after a postal ballot of the members. The launch was not without its problems however: within a month, many activists had joined the continuing National Front run by John McAuley.

Anderson maintained contacts in Northern Ireland (which the Flag Group's Joe Pearce had built up during the 1980s), particularly within the right of the Ulster Unionist Party and in the 1997 General Election he stood as a candidate for the Londonderry East constituency. Securing a mere 0.2% share of the vote in the constituency, Anderson soon abandoned his Northern Ireland strategy.

=== Later activities ===
The National Democrats became the Campaign for National Democracy pressure group and ceased actively contesting elections.

In 2004, he became a figure in community politics, campaigning for adult learning, local clean-ups, and more shops and fewer restaurants amongst other local campaigns. He was also involved in setting up the People's Campaign to Keep the Pound, along with Anthony Bennett, a leading member of Robert Kilroy-Silk's Veritas.

Anderson was the leader of the short-lived Epping Community Action Group, which was registered with the Electoral Commission as a political party in April 2006. The group stood two candidates, including Anderson, for election to Epping Forest District Council in the 2007 local elections, but came third in both wards. He gained 215 votes in the Epping Hemnall ward beating a British National Party candidate by 68 votes.

Anderson was also involved in a number of other groups such as the Conservative Democratic Alliance. He gave considerable support to UKIP in later years and aided Pam Barden of Save Our Sovereignty (now sponsored by UKIP).

=== Panther Print ===
Anderson ran a printing business called Panther Print in Dagenham, which has been used by the nationalist movement. Panther Print was based at Britannia House, and the building doubled as National Democrats' HQ.

He died in Epping in 2011 from a brain tumour, at the age of 57. His funeral took place on 15 February 2011.

== Parliamentary elections contested ==
Date of election	Constituency	Party	Votes	%
Oct 1974	Oxford	NF	572	1.0
1979	Newham South	NF	1,899	6.2
28 October 1982	Birmingham Northfield	NF	411	0.9
1983	Newham South	NF	993	3.7
1992	Bristol East	NF	270	0.5
1997	East Londonderry	NDs	81	0.2
31 July 1997	Uxbridge	NDs	157	0.5
