= Flag Group =

British far-right political party

The Flag Group was a British far-right political party, formed from one of the two wings of the National Front in the 1980s. Formed in opposition to the Political Soldier wing of the Official National Front, it took its name from The Flag, a newspaper the followers of this faction formed after leaving and regrouping outside the main and diminishing rump of the rest of the party.

== Emergence ==
During the early 1980s the Political Soldier wing of the NF held sway within the party and was on good terms with chairman Andrew Brons who, although a Strasserite by conviction rather than a disciple of Julius Evola and ruralism, largely supported the young radicals and co-operated with them to remove Martin Webster, the former ally of Brons' predecessor John Tyndall, from the party in 1984. However cracks between the two factions soon began to show and a power struggle ensued. This culminated in 1986 when the two wings of the party split, with around 3000 of the 5000 registered NF members breaking away with Brons to form a new separate group. The immediate actual cause of the split had been the refusal of the Political Soldiers to contest elections and the Brons group made this the issue on which they started their own group, initially called the National Front Support Group before adopting their more usual Flag Group moniker. Activists such as Martin Wingfield, Ian Anderson, Joseph Pearce and Tom Acton emerged as the new leading figures within this group and the Flag Group initially grew at a much faster rate than the Official National Front, although this was in part due to the Political Soldiers closing off membership of their wing.

== Ideology ==
The Flag Group rejected the mysticism of the Political Soldiers and the ONF's technique of establishing contacts with non-white groups such as Black Power and Islamic fundamentalism activists. Despite these differences with the ONF the Flag Group was not a direct copy of the earlier NF as it was also influenced by 'left-wing' economics ideals of Strasserism, albeit whilst emphasising anti-immigration and anti-Semitism alongside this. As time went on and Brons was sidelined in favour of Wingfield and Anderson the Flag Group began to look more towards the populism of the Front National, which was enjoying comparative success in France at the time, resulting in a return to more basic racist sentiments and less emphasis on economics as opposed to Strasserism. Amongst their more crudely racialist policies the Flag Group stressed the importance of having large families and included ideas about the white race being bred out of existence in their election literature. Steve Brady, formerly a leading figure in the National Party, championed this idea within the Flag Group although his other favoured idea, his opposition to Christianity in particular and religion in general and his desire to see a purely secular basis for Flag Group nationalism, was not taken up. Wingfield's strategy for growth included recruiting new members at football grounds, a tactic that initially paid dividends.

== Development ==
Brons had a history of low-level co-operation with the British National Party whilst he and BNP leader John Tyndall went back to the early 1960s when they were both active in the National Socialist Movement and so not long after the split Brons contacted Stanley Clayton-Garnett, the BNP's Northern leader, with a view to closer co-operation. Tyndall and Brons met formally in Leeds in May 1987 to discuss the formation of a 'Nationalist Alliance' to be organised along the lines of the SDP–Liberal Alliance in existence at the time. A Liaison Committee was set up as a result of this meeting and Brons put the idea to the Flag Group's steering committee that same July. The plan however came to nothing as it was rejected by the steering committee and so disavowed by Brons in October 1987. Within the Flag Group it was widely reported that the rejection had happened because of a fear that Tyndall intended only to swallow up the party and make himself sole leader whilst within the BNP it was suggested that the Flag Group's Strasserism made them incompatible with the party. It has also been argued that Flag editor Martin Wingfield, who published an editorial denouncing notions of merger, sabotaged the move because he bore a grudge against Tyndall and his father-in-law Charles Parker after Wingfiled had attempted, unsuccessfully, to replace the latter as NF organiser in Sussex some years earlier, a struggle that resulted in Wingfield's temporary expulsion from the NF. Nonetheless the parties did continue to co-operate unofficially whilst Tom Acton also managed to win support for the Group from the influential publisher Anthony Hancock who had initially favoured the ONF in the split. As well as their monthly newspaper The Flag the group also published a monthly magazine Vanguard and Lonheart, a quarterly.

== Decline ==
As a separate group, the Flag Group contested Bristol East in the 1987 general election. By the 1989 Vauxhall by-election, they had resumed using the National Front name, even though their candidate Ted Budden faced opposition from Official National Front candidate Patrick Harrington. Other elections contested included the Epping Forest by-election of December 1988, the European Parliament election of 1989 in which the West Midlands seat was fought by Wingfield and the Mid-Staffordshire by-election of March 1990 in which the party finished behind even parody candidate Screaming Lord Sutch. This policy of contesting elections, invariably with very disappointing results, left the Flag Group with a significant funding shortage. By 1989 the Flag Group had around 1,500 members with most activity centred on the West Midlands. Another activity centre had been Tower Hamlets although following the failure of the 'Nationalist Alliance' initiative this group, which included future BNP Campaign Director Eddy Butler, switched en bloc to the BNP.

As the 1980s drew to a close, the ONF disintegrated with its place being taken by the International Third Position and the Third Way. This allowed the Flag Group to assume sole control of the name, mantle and traditions of NF and effectively signalled the end of the Flag Group as a name. Soon they would attempt to relaunch the NF as the National Democrats.
