= Martin Wingfield =

British far-right politician

Martin Wingfield (born 1951) is a British far-right politician. Wingfield is long-standing figure in the British nationalist movement, he and his wife, Tina Wingfield, having contested several elections since the 1980s.

== Biography ==
=== National Front ===
Disillusioned with the Liberal Party, Wingfield joined the far-right National Front in 1976 and quickly rose in the party, winning election to the National Directorate in 1980. He became editor of the National Front News for a time, from 1983. He was briefly expelled from the party by John Tyndall after attempting to take control of the Sussex branch of the party from Tyndall's father-in-law Charles Parker by publishing a dissident paper the Sussex Front.

With Ian Anderson, he was associated with the traditionalist Flag Group wing in opposition to the Political Soldier wing and became one of the leading members of this dissident group, editing their paper The Flag. Around this time he was criticized by leading Official National Front member Nick Griffin as being more suited to the extreme right-wing of the Conservative Party. In his role as editor of NF party organs Wingfield was charged under the Race Relations Act in 1985 for saying "unless immigration is stopped, Crawley will end up one day like Brixton with all the problems and crime that that entails." After refusing to pay a fine, was imprisoned.

=== National Democrats ===
Wingfield was a member of the National Democrats (ND), continuing to edit The Flag for them and acting as the party's press officer. In the 1997 General Election, he stood as the ND candidate for Wolverhampton North East constituency gaining 356 votes (0.9%); his wife, Tina, stood as a ND candidate for the Blackburn constituency gaining 671 votes (1.41%).

=== British National Party ===
In 2001, he joined the British National Party, and is currently the editor of the party's newspaper, Voice of Freedom. He was on the BNP candidate list for the North-West England regional constituency in the 2004 European Election and again in 2009, when party leader Nick Griffin was elected. He stood for Workington, as did his wife, Tina, for Salford and Eccles in the 2010 general election. In August 2011, after the BNP had a leadership challenge, both Martin and his wife had shown support to Andrew Brons and now face being sacked by the party for 'breaching confidentiality'.

== Elections contested by Martin Wingfield ==
UK Parliament

Year	Constituency	Party	Votes	%
1983	Worthing	NF	292	0.5
1997	Wolverhampton North East	NDs	356	0.9
2010	Workington	BNP	1,496	3.8

European Parliament

Year	Constituency	Party	Votes	%	Notes
1989	Birmingham East	NF	1,471	0.8	Single member constituencies

Year	Region	Party	Votes	%	Result	Notes
2004	North West England	BNP	134,959	6.4	Not elected	Multi member constituencies; party list
2009	North West England	BNP	132,194	8.0	Not elected	Multi member constituencies; party list

== Elections contested by Tina Wingfield ==
UK Parliament

Date of election	Constituency	Party	Votes	%
18 December 1988 by-election	Epping Forest	I NF	286	0.6
1 May 1997	Blackburn	NDs	671	1.14
7 May 2010	Salford and Eccles	BNP	2,632	6.3

== See also ==
- British National Front
- British National Party
- National Democrats
