= Ted Budden =

Edward Budden (died 2000) was a British veteran of the far right who was well known in such circles for his satirical columns that appeared in a number of publications down the years.

== Biography ==
Rivalled only by John Graeme Wood in terms of his longevity on the British far right, Budden began his career as a low level member of the British Union of Fascists. Budden did not come to prominence, however, until the 1960s when, after a period of involvement in a number of local groups, he became a leading member of the Racial Preservation Society, whilst also taking a senior role in the John Bean's British National Party (not to be confused with the current party of the same name). Bean credits Budden, who was closely linked to the publishers Alan and Anthony Hancock, with playing a leading role in negotiating a merger between the two groups and the League of Empire Loyalists that led to the foundation of the National Front. Budden was also a member of the Northern League and played a central role in the production of RPS journal Race and Nation, as published by Alan and Anthony Hancock.

Budden initially played a leading role in the NF and in the general election of February 1974 he was chosen to fight his home constituency of Hove. However the election was to prove singularly unsuccessful for Budden as his 442 votes (0.8% share) was the NF's lowest vote of the election. He fared no better in 1983 when an outing in Brighton Kemptown saw him win only 290 votes (0.7%), although by that time the NF vote had dropped off consistently. According to Matthew Collins, an NF activist who later came to work for Searchlight, Budden's campaign was as hamstrung by opposition from the Official National Front as anti-fascist activists, with Budden's electoral posters and stickers removed or defaced by Political Soldier tendency supporters. At the time Collins, like Budden, belonged to the "Flag Group" tendency within the NF.

Much more than his electioneering, Budden became known for his column, which was a regular feature of a number of NF publications, including Spearhead. Although offering the standard views of racism, Antisemitism and the like associated with the far right, it was appreciated by readers for its high level of satire and became a long-running feature of various rightist publications.

During the 1980s, as head of the NF's Brighton branch, Budden was closely associated with the Flag Group (his column appearing regularly in The Flag) and was involved in one of the main incidents that exposed the lack of unity in the NF. Following the resignation of Stuart Holland, Budden was chosen by the Flag Group to represent the party in the resulting by-election. Amongst his opponents, however, was an Official National Front candidate Patrick Harrington and as a result neither candidate polled at all well (although Budden finished behind Harrington, capturing only 83 votes). The whole event indicated just how much the NF had descended into in-fighting.

By the 1990s, Budden was noted for his alternative views within nationalist circles promoting the concept of European unity and (similar to John Bean and Oswald Mosley after the war) he supported Britain's membership of the European Economic Community (which became today's European Union).

As the Flag Group ran its course, Budden went on to join the current British National Party and, under John Tyndall, the Ted Budden Column became a feature of the party's monthly newspaper British Nationalist. Although previously dismissed by Nick Griffin as 'an elderly bigot' Budden continued to write for the BNP until his death.

== Elections contested ==
| Date of election | Constituency | Party | Votes | % |
|---|---|---|---|---|
| February 1974 | Hove | NF | 442 | 0.8 |
| 1983 | Brighton Kemptown | NF | 290 | 0.7 |
| 15 June 1989 | Vauxhall | NF | 83 | 0.3 |
