= Historical Review =

Historical Review may refer to:

- Historical Review (Istorijski Časopis), published by the Institute of History Belgrade
- Historical Review, published by the National Hellenic Research Foundation
- Historical Review Press, a Holocaust-denial publishing imprint established by Anthony Hancock

== See also ==
- History Today, formerly History Review, a London-based monthly illustrated history magazine
