= Alan Hancock =

British far-right politician

Alan Vivien Hancock (14 August 1914 – July 1989) was one of the early leaders of the Racial Preservation Society (RPS). He was formerly a member of the British Union of Fascists (BUF) which was formed in 1932 by ex-Labour government minister Sir Oswald Mosley and was a union of several small, extreme nationalist parties. Hancock formed part of a three-man leadership team in the RPS who came from the BUF, alongside Ted Budden and Jimmy Doyle.

He was the father of Anthony Hancock and set up a printing press called Wilson Press in Uckfield.
