= 1975 United Kingdom local elections =

- 1 May 1975

All 36 metropolitan boroughs
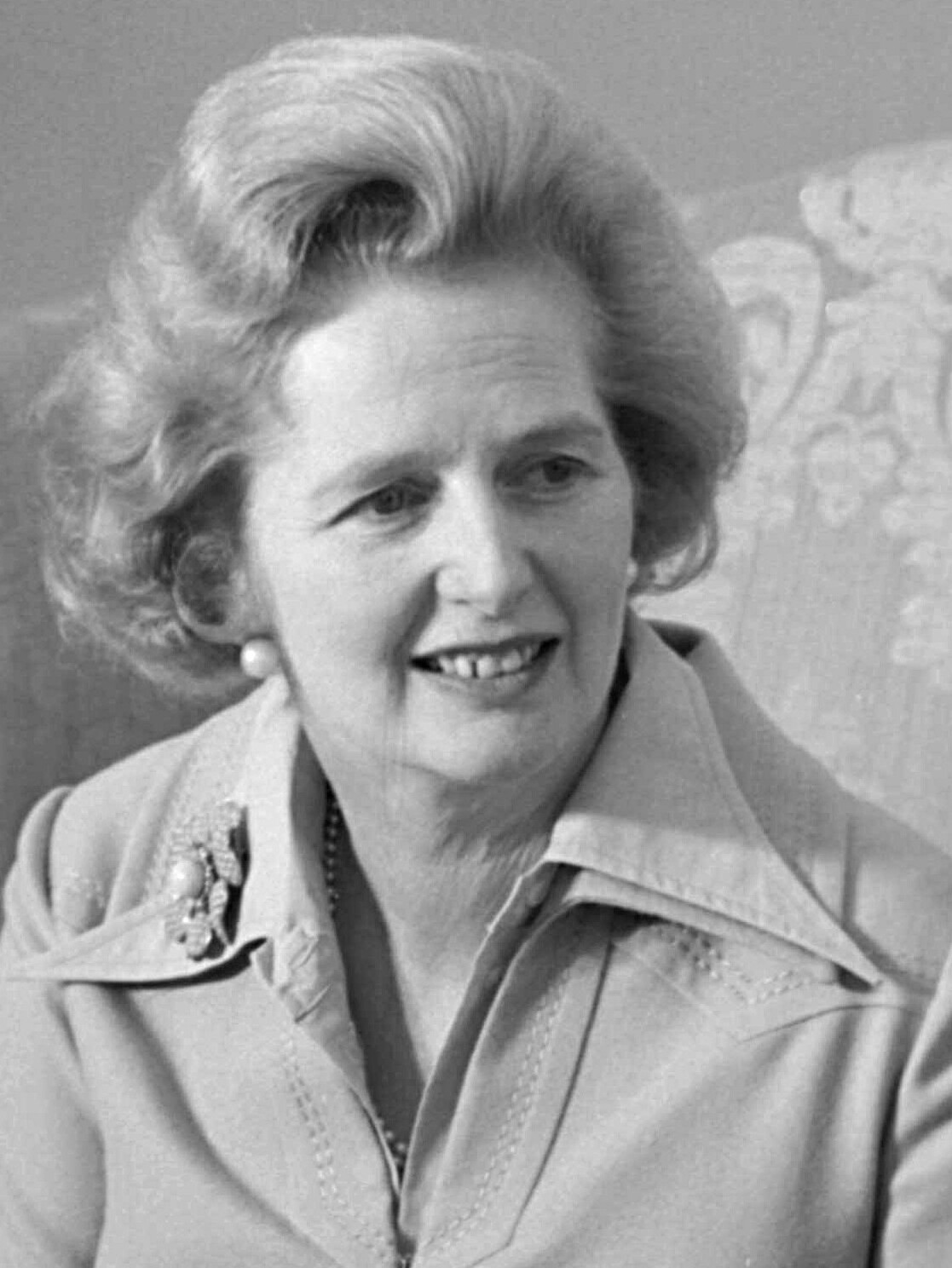

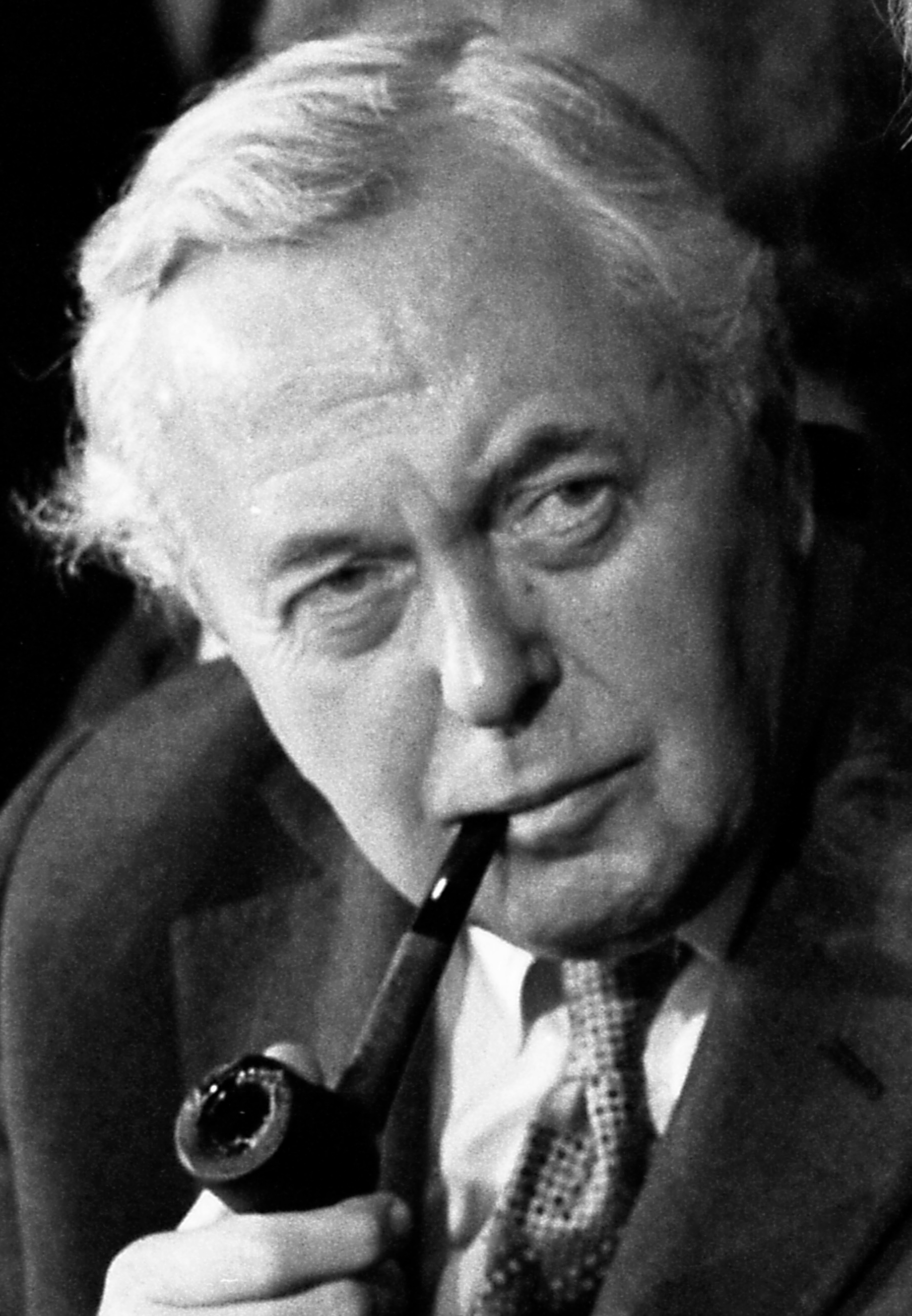
	Majority party	Minority party	Third party
			Lib
Leader	Margaret Thatcher	Harold Wilson	Jeremy Thorpe
Party	Conservative	Labour	Liberal
Leader since	11 February 1975	14 February 1963	18 January 1967
Councillors +/-	▲199	▼206	▼10

Local elections took place for one third of the seats of the thirty-six metropolitan boroughs on 1 May 1975. The seats had previously been contested in May 1973, when the Labour Party had achieved great success. In the 1975 elections the Conservative Party made widespread gains, with a net gain of 199 seats and Labour had a net loss of 206. The Liberal Party had a net loss of 10 seats, and Independents a loss of 5. "Others", including Ratepayers, Independent Labour councillors and Progressives made net gains of 22.

The Conservatives gained control of Bury, Stockport and Wirral from no overall control; and Calderdale form Labour. They also became the largest party on Leeds City Council.

Labour retained control of Birmingham by the mayor's casting vote.

The Liberals failed to gain overall control of Liverpool, losing a net three seats but remaining the largest party on the council by a single seat.

== England ==
=== Metropolitan boroughs ===
District	County	Conservative	Labour	Liberal	Independent	Other	Control
Barnsley	South Yorkshire	0	48 (-7)	1 (+1)	1	Ratepayers 6 (+6) Independent Labour 2; 2 Vacancies	Labour hold
Birmingham	West Midlands	55 (+11)	63 (-10)	8 (-1)	0	0	Labour hold
Bolton	Greater Manchester	42 (+7)	23 (-8)	3 (+1)	1	0	Conservative hold
Bradford	West Yorkshire	57 (+4)	28 (-3)	8 (-1)	0	0	Conservative hold
Bury	Greater Manchester	28 (+7)	16 (-4)	4 (-3)	0	0	Conservative gain from NOC
Calderdale	West Yorkshire	28 (+11)	18 (-11)	5	0	0	Conservative gain from Labour
Coventry	West Midlands	21 (+9)	33 (-9)	0	3	0	Labour hold
Doncaster	South Yorkshire	15 (+3)	40 (-2)	0	3 (-1)	Democratic Labour 1; 1 Vacancy	Labour hold
Dudley	West Midlands	29 (+5)	35 (-5)	0	1	Independent Socialist 1	Labour hold
Gateshead	Tyne and Wear	10 (+4)	65 (-5)	2 (+1)	1	0	Labour hold
Kirklees	West Yorkshire	28 (+9)	36 (-8)	7 (-1)	1	0	Labour hold
Knowsley	Merseyside	12 (+4)	45 (-5)	3	1	1 (+1)	Labour hold
Leeds	West Yorkshire	43 (+6)	41 (-4)	12 (-2)	0	0	NOC
Liverpool	Merseyside	14 (+4)	42 (-1)	43 (-3)	0	0	NOC
Manchester	Greater Manchester	45	54	0	0	0	Labour hold
Newcastle upon Tyne	Tyne and Wear	27 (+4)	47 (-4)	2 (+1)	2 (-1)	0	Labour hold
North Tyneside	Tyne and Wear	24 (+5)	46 (-1)	4 (-2)	4 (-2)	0	Labour hold
Oldham	Greater Manchester	15 (+9)	30 (-11)	11 (+2)	1	3 Vacancies	Labour hold
Rochdale	Greater Manchester	22 (+8)	28 (-9)	10 (+1)	0	0	Labour lose to NOC
Rotherham	South Yorkshire	7 (+4)	44 (-6)	0	2 (+1)	Ratepayers 1 (+1)	Labour hold
St Helens	Merseyside	14 (+5)	30 (-6)	1 (+1)	0	Ratepayers 0 (-1)	Labour hold
Salford	Greater Manchester	20 (+5)	44 (-6)	1	0	Tenants and Ratepayers 1 (+1)	Labour
Sandwell	West Midlands	32 (+10)	58 (-10)	0	0	0	Labour hold
Sefton	Merseyside	40 (+3)	22 (-2)	3	2	Ratepayers 2 (-1)	Conservative hold
Sheffield	South Yorkshire	20 (+2)	66 (-3)	4 (+1)	0	0	Labour hold
Solihull	West Midlands	30 (+1)	12	2	7 (-1)	0	Conservative hold
South Tyneside	Tyne and Wear	5 (+2)	35 (-10)	3 (+3)	0	Progressives 23 (+5)	Labour hold
Stockport	Greater Manchester	34	12	10	4	0	Conservative gain from NOC
Sunderland	Tyne and Wear	23 (+2)	52 (-4)	1 (+1)	0	Independent Labour 1 (+1)	Labour hold
Tameside	Greater Manchester	24 (+11)	28 (-11)	2	0	0	Labour hold
Trafford	Greater Manchester	42 (+9)	13 (-5)	8 (-4)	0	0	Conservative hold
Wakefield	West Yorkshire	11 (+5)	45 (-10)	0	1 (-1)	Ratepayers 6 (+6) 3 Vacancies	Labour
Walsall	West Midlands	14 (+4)	37 (-7)	0	4 (+1)	Ratepayers 5 (+2)	Labour hold
Wigan	Greater Manchester	10 (+5)	61 (-5)	0	1 (+1)	0 (-1)	Labour
Wirral	Merseyside	36 (+7)	21 (-3)	9 (-4)	0	0	Conservative gain from NOC
Wolverhampton	West Midlands	28 (+2)	31 (-3)	0	0	Ratepayers 1 (+1)	Labour hold
