= Patrick Harrington (activist) =

British political activist

Leader of Third Way
- Incumbent
- Assumed office 1990
- Preceded by: Position established

Personal details
- Born: 24 May 1964 (age 62) Kennington, London, UK

Patrick Antony Harrington (born 24 May 1964) is a far-right British political activist and writer of Irish Catholic family origins, who has published pamphlets by the Social Credit advocate and former editor of the Liverpool Newsletter, Anthony Cooney, about prominent Catholic writers such as G. K. Chesterton, J.R.R. Tolkien and Hilaire Belloc. He is currently general secretary of Solidarity – The Union for British Workers and a director of the Third Way, a think tank (since 1989).

He is a committed and lifelong vegetarian. He has two children and lives in Edinburgh.

== Ideological development and political position ==
Although he first came to prominence as a leading member of the National Front in the 1980s, Patrick Harrington claims he has undergone substantial ideological change since he voted to disband the NF in 1989. In his profile on the Third Way website, he cites Rabbi Mayer Schiller as a particular influence on this development. Schiller is the subject of a biography on the Third Way website, although his role in the party is unclear.

In an interview with Wayne John Sturgeon of Alternative Green magazine, Harrington said:

"I voted for the disbandment of the National Front in 1989 which I think speaks for itself. Since that time I have worked with my Third Way colleagues for harmony and progress in our country. There are aspects of my involvement with the NF which I deeply regret. I wasted a lot of time trying to move people to more positive, inclusive positions. I should have broken with them earlier. The past, however, is gone and cannot be changed. I have rethought, rejected or refined many of my past positions. This is a process which has led me to where I am now. I hope that people would judge me on my current ideas and actions rather than re-fight the battles of the past.

Sturgeon has been closely associated with Troy Southgate's various nationalist-anarchist groups, from the National Revolutionary Faction (NRF) to the New Right, which describes itself as "opposed to liberalism, democracy and egalitarianism".

In "I Rejected National Front", an article written for The Voice (a publication aimed at the British Afro-Caribbean community) and apparently published on 13 February 2006 (but reproduced on Third Way's website), Harrington wrote:

"Third Way, which I helped form in 1990, advocates harmonious relationships between all communities. Third Way welcomes the vibrant contribution that this variety brings but we are also aware that there can be friction between communities.

"We must be honest about these difficulties and work to solve problems together in a spirit of unity. Third Way policy is very different from that of the BNP which we have stood against in elections."

== General Secretary of Solidarity 2006 to present ==
In January 2006, Harrington was appointed General Secretary of Solidarity. In November 2007, following independently scrutinised elections, he was returned unopposed for a five-year period. He has since been returned unopposed for a second five-year term.

The Union Executive elected in 2012 consists of Harrington (General Secretary), Michelle Harrington, Glen Nicklasson, Graham Williamson, Clive Jefferson and David Kerr (President).

=== Expulsion from RMT ===
Harrington was expelled from the National Union of Rail, Maritime and Transport Workers (RMT) on 27 June 2003 and ascribes his involvement in Solidarity to this. The RMT claimed in a press release that he had joined under a false name and was expelled when his identity was discovered; Harrington responded that he joined under his married name and that he was known to the union by both names and challenged the grounds for expulsion.

He has claimed that the reasons given for his expulsion were a pretext to cover a political motive and accused the RMT of supporting a "New McCarthyism".

== Directorship of the Third Way 1990 to present ==
The Third Way think tank (not be confused with the ideas associated with Tony Blair and Bill Clinton) advocates direct democracy along Swiss lines using referendums and citizens' initiatives, and is strongly influenced by Distributism and Social Credit. It supports small business and co-operative ownership, while opposing over-centralised government and promoting decision making at the lowest practical level. It recruits from all religious and ethnic communities. According to accounts filed with the Electoral Commission, in 2004 Third Way had 20 members and a cash flow of approximately £1,400.

In the 2005 general election it fielded two candidates who received 376 votes between them. According to the Electoral Commission searchable database, the registration of Third Way Publications Ltd lapsed and Ulster Third Way was "voluntarily deregistered" in 2005.

The National Liberal Party (NLP) was founded in 1999 by Patrick Harrington and Graham Williamson. In 2006, the Third Way registered the name National Liberal Party – The Third Way. Its constitution distinguishes between "Members", "Registered Supporters" and "Supporting Subscribers". It also operates through a number of Limited Companies and Associations.

The 2012 accounts filed with the Electoral Commission do not mention Harrington and reveal membership income of about £400 and total income of about £950.

== Membership of the National Front 1979 to 1989 ==
=== Polytechnic of North London protests ===
In 1984, Harrington was the subject of protests by students at the Polytechnic of North London (later the University of North London, now part of London Metropolitan University), who picketed his lectures to protest against his being able to study philosophy while a prominent member of the National Front (NF), which he joined in 1979, and deputy editor of its publication NF News. Students argued that his presence made life intolerable for ethnic minority students. Harrington disputed this and insisted on his right to attend lectures. He obtained a court injunction to stop the picketing; the protestors, backed by their students' union, ignored this. Two student leaders were sent to jail for 16 days for contempt of a court order preventing them from barring Harrington from college.

In December 1984, Dr David MacDowall, the Polytechnic's director, resigned after pressure from the Inner London Education Authority (ILEA) to make a complaint against Harrington for remarks he made in a radio interview. ILEA said the remarks were racist, which Harrington denied. In his resignation letter, MacDowall admitted that he had acted "in a totally fascistic manner" over the issue, and wished "all the picketing students the best of luck with their campaign". Harrington subsequently faced a college hearing for a television interview in which, in line with NF policy, he questioned the right of black people to citizenship.

In January 1985, with final exams approaching, the students' union, Harrington and the Polytechnic administration agreed a deal in which all of Harrington's classes would be taught in an annexe away from the main building. His fellow students boycotted these lectures and many lecturers taught them informally. Harrington eventually graduated with a philosophy degree.

=== Official National Front ===
In the late 1980s, the National Front underwent a schism. Harrington sided with the Political Soldier group that included Nick Griffin (who later became leader of the British National Party) and Derek Holland. This group eventually termed itself the Official National Front. The ideas of Harrington and his allies led to alienation of some NF supporters with the Flag Group splitting off to follow more traditional NF ideas. Harrington was involved in one of the manifestations of these divisions in the 1989 Vauxhall by-election when, as a candidate, one of his opponents was Ted Budden of the Flag Group. In September 1988, the three men visited Libya as a guest of the Gaddafi regime. In October, the Political Soldier NF was the subject of a Channel 4 documentary, Disciples of Chaos in which Harrington was interviewed.

There was another schism in 1989 when Harrington and Graham Williamson parted company with Griffin and Holland. The ONF had opened dialogue with groups like the Nation of Islam and the Pan-Afrikan International Movement. According to Harrington's account of the split, when he opened discussion with Jewish nationalist and anti-Zionist rabbi Mayer Schiller (see section on Harrington's ideological development below) and advocated a two-state solution to the Israeli–Palestinian conflict, he was attacked as a "Zionist". Harrington and Williamson attended pro-Palestinian demonstrations such as the 1988 Quds Day march in London, as part of an ONF strategy to show support for Muslim anti-Zionists.

For their part, Griffin and Holland claimed that Harrington's refusal to condemn the IRA had been the cause of many problems. Party members in Ulster sided with Harrington. In late 1989, Harrington voted for the disbandment of the Official National Front and joined with others to form the Third Way in 1990. Griffin and Holland formed the International Third Position. Later Griffin left this group and joined the BNP.

=== Relationship with Skrewdriver/Blood & Honour ===
As an official of the NF, Harrington was involved in administering the White Noise Club, which organised white power music concerts featuring, among others, Skrewdriver. In 1987, the Political Soldier group fell out with Ian Stuart, the lead singer of Skrewdriver. Stuart responded by setting up his own group, Blood & Honour, whose eponymous publication openly attacked his former NF associates. They in turn denounced Stuart. Harrington and Holland are allegedly the subjects of the Skrewdriver song "A Time of Change", included on their 1988 album After the Fire.

=== Allegations of links with state security ===
In February 1990, Searchlight magazine alleged that Harrington had ongoing connections to Special Branch and MI6. Harrington has denied any such links.

=== Connection to Nick Griffin and the BNP ===
Harrington has had previous links with Nick Griffin and has provided legal services in the past to the British National Party, but he denies that these associations imply ideological agreement. He worked for Nick Griffin as a European Parliamentary local assistant during the MEP's term of office.

In September 2005, he edited, and Third Way published, a pamphlet entitled Taking Liberties, with an article by Griffin. In the editorial Harrington wrote, "Let me nail my colours to the mast. I believe that speech (and other forms of expression) should be protected regardless of content or viewpoint. I am against any law that seeks to discriminate against any religious, racial or political group. I'm also against any law that favours one such interest group over another."

Harrington defends his decision to publish an article from Griffin on civil liberties grounds. His role as general secretary of Solidarity, and its association with the BNP, is discussed above.

=== Change in position? ===
Harrington has argued that he has moved away from many of his previous positions. Before the 2019 general election, he told members of Solidarity that he would be voting Labour, and wrote, "[L]ooking at the domestic economy and rights for workers Labour's promises are unmatched. I want to see re-Nationalisation and I want to see attacks on the rights of ordinary workers reversed. I want ordinary people to have more control over their working lives." After the election, Harrington stated, "I made it clear during the election campaign that I, as an individual, supported and would vote Labour because of the pro-worker policies in their manifesto. I always feared, however, that the many fine domestic policy offerings from Labour, which I as someone left-leaning, pro-union and pro-worker approved of, would be overshadowed by Brexit."

== Publications ==
Harrington's published works include:

- The Third Way – An Answer to Blair (ISBN 0-9535077-0-X)
- The Third Way Manifesto 1997 (ISBN 0-9544788-7-8)
- The Third Way Manifesto 2001 (with Cliff Morrison) (ISBN 0-9535077-9-3)
- The Third Way Manifesto 2005 (editor) (ISBN 0-9544788-4-3)
- Catholic Social Teaching (with Anthony Cooney and John Medaille) (ISBN 0-9535077-6-9)
- Tolkien and Politics (with Anthony Cooney and David Kerr) (ISBN 0-9544788-2-7)
- Taking Liberties – A Third Way Special on Attacks on Civil Liberties in the UK (with Nick Griffin, Graham Williamson, Tim Bragg and David Kerr) (ISBN 0-9544788-5-1)
- Taking Liberties 2 – The New McCarthyism (with Sean Gabb, Henry Falconer, Robert Henderson and Tim Bragg) (ISBN 0-9544788-6-X)
- Counter Culture Anthology (Edited by Tim Bragg with many essays by Harrington) (ISBN 1-84728-118-4)
- TOLKIEN: Redescubriendo el lenguaje del mito y la aventura (various authors with a contribution from Harrington) (ISBN 978-84-941924-0-1)
- Orwell: Viviendo el futuro y recordando el pasado (various authors with a contribution from Harrington) (ISBN 978-84-944210-2-0)
