= Official National Front =

British far-right political party

The Official National Front (ONF) was one of two far-right groups to emerge in the United Kingdom in 1986 following a split within the National Front. Following ideological paths that were mostly new to the British far-right, the ONF stood opposed to the more traditionalist Flag Group.

== Development ==
The ONF emerged in the early 1980s when young radicals such as Nick Griffin, Derek Holland, Patrick Harrington and David Kerr became attracted to Third Position ideas and, eschewing the route of electoral politics favoured by the National Front up to that point, hoped to develop a cadre of devoted nationalist revolutionaries. Emphasising a strong anti-capitalist as well as anti-communist line, the ONF began to emerge as the most powerful group within the NF after the series of splits in late 1979 and early 1980 though they did not come to prominence within the NF until 1984 when Martin Webster was expelled from the Party.

The Political Soldier faction began with the support of chairman Andrew Brons but before long differences between the two factions began to show. This came to a head in 1986 when the party split in two, with around 2,000 of the NF's 5,000 membership following Griffin into the ONF and the rest departing for the Flag Group. The ONF maintained the monthly newspaper the National Front News and took control also of Nationalism Today during this period.

With control assured the ONF took on responsibility for instructing its members ideologically and gained the backing of Rosine de Bounevialle, a veteran of the League of Empire Loyalists and the publisher of the antisemitic journal Candour, who allowed these training seminars to be held on her Hampshire estate. Subsequently, these were moved to specially prepared buildings on land owned by Nick Griffin's father Edgar.

== Ideology ==
Aided by Roberto Fiore, whose Terza Posizione held similar views, the ONF developed an ideology that stressed the need for a "New Man" with the cadre structure influenced by the "nest" system of the pre-Second World War Romanian Iron Guard. The two main sources of ideology for the ONF were the journal Rising published from 1983 to 1986 and The Political Soldier, a 1984 book by Derek Holland. Within the pages of these works the ONF committed itself to a revolt against modernity, echoing many of the words of the likes of Corneliu Codreanu and Julius Evola. The party put emphasis on the values of ruralism with Nick Griffin, who lived on a farm in Wales, running a "Smash the Cities" campaign for the ONF that has been compared by Nicholas Goodrick-Clarke to Pol Potism.

Unlike the earlier NF, that had emphasised British identity, the ONF showed sympathy towards indigenous nationalisms within the United Kingdom. The ONF adopted a policy of support for Ulster nationalism, a fringe idea within Northern Ireland, and through this shift forged links with the Ulster Defence Association and in particular John McMichael who was advocating such an idea at the time. Separate links were also maintained with sometime Democratic Unionist Party activist George Seawright who, although not avowedly an Ulster nationalist, was the brother of ONF activist David Seawright. Although there was no evidence of a direct connection between the two groups the ONF broke from the exclusively British nationalist vision of its predecessors to praise the activities of the Welsh nationalist Meibion Glyndŵr.

The desire for the development of a fanatical Political Soldier also led the ONF to follow their Italian counterparts in expressing some admiration for a similar fanaticism that they saw in Islam. This idea led to the publication of the most notorious issue of NF News which featured a cover extolling the 'new alliance' of the party with the Ayatollah Khomeini, Muammar Gaddafi and Louis Farrakhan, a previously unthinkable stance in the NF. During a march for Quds Day in 1988 Patrick Harrington and Graham Williamson took their place alongside a group of Islamic fundamentalists.

The 'scientific racism' that had been the cornerstone of NF ideas up to that point was abandoned by the ONF in favour of an emphasis on ethnopluralism and expressions of admiration for Black separatist leaders such as Farrakhan and Marcus Garvey, a new departure illustrated by the August 1987 edition of National Front News in which the slogan 'Black is beautiful' appeared. Copies of the Nation of Islam-linked newspaper The Final Call could also be purchased from the ONF.

== Decline ==
The desire to build a Political Soldier leadership meant that the ONF was by its nature exclusive and limited. Membership in its strictest sense was effectively closed off with outsiders only allowed to become "Friends of the Movement" and full membership being only open to those chosen by the leadership. The ideas held less appeal for the racist skinheads that the ONF still had links with. The ONF saw the skinheads as a source of eager foot-soldiers for their revolutionary struggles, a factor that led the ONF to host Rock Against Communism concerts in the mid-1980s. However, disillusionment set in with the ONF's esoteric ideas and in 1987 sometime NF member and Skrewdriver singer Ian Stuart Donaldson joined with British Movement organiser Nicky Crane to set up Blood and Honour, initially as a magazine before developing it into a movement for White power bands independent of the parties. The departure of these groups also meant a loss of one of the ONF's main sources of revenue and the split proved fairly divisive with B&H supporters dubbing the ONF the "Nutty Fairy Party" due to their unusual ideas and rumours of homosexuality within the leadership. The split came at a bad time as membership had already been curtailed by the decision in 1986 to double the price of membership fees and to restrict membership to those considered worthy of Political Soldier status by the leadership. The group's devotion to the likes of Evola and Codreanu also damaged its chances as these thinkers were virtually unknown in Britain and as such the ONF's ideas were considered too foreign to be relevant to a British context.

In an attempt to gain much needed funds, Griffin and Holland travelled to Libya in 1988 in the hope of persuading Muammar Gaddafi to provide money to bankroll the ONF. However, the pair were able to secure only a consignment of copies of the colonel's political testament The Green Book, meaning that the group's financial woes were not alleviated. Breaking from its own ban on electoral activity, Harrington ran as a candidate in the 1989 Vauxhall by-election, during which his rival candidates included the Flag Group's Ted Budden, who confusingly was standing as a "National Front" candidate. Both men received derisory vote shares.

In 1989 Harrington, who was by then effective leader of the group, approached The Jewish Chronicle with a view to opening dialogue with the Jewish community. The move proved unpopular with Griffin and Holland who broke off in 1989 to form the International Third Position (ITP), which advocated anti-capitalist Strasserist views, as well as continuing anti-Zionism. With the ONF in disarray, Harrington (by then effective leader, although the ONF had eschewed an individual leader at their peak) wound up the group in January 1990 and reconstituted it, along with about fifty NF members, as the Third Way, which continued to offer a programme akin to that of the Political Soldier movement. The Flag Group, led by Martin Wingfield and Ian Anderson, reclaimed the NF name and identity and sought to reposition the NF once again by following the example of the base itself on the Front National, which was experiencing growth in France through right-wing populism.
