= Racial Preservation Society =

British far-right pressure group

The Racial Preservation Society was a far-right pressure group opposed to immigration and in favour of white nationalism, national preservation and protection in the United Kingdom in the 1960s.

== Background ==
Although parties such as the Union Movement, the British National Party and the National Socialist Movement organised at the time, much of the opposition to immigration in Britain during the early 1960s was locally based, centring on groups such as the Southall Residents Association and the Birmingham Immigration Control Association, groups that sought to influence local policy makers within the Conservative and Labour parties. Attempts were made to co-ordinate the work of like-minded groups across Britain, although many of these initiatives, such as Tom Finney's English Rights Association or Tom Jones' Argus British Rights Association did not have the organisational basis required to forge any meaningful unity. It was against this backdrop that the RPS first emerged.

== Formation ==
The first arm of the RPS was founded in Brighton in 1965 by Robin Beauclaire and Jimmy Doyle. With this group covering the South, a second group was established, covering the Midlands and utilising the existing structure of the Argus British Rights Association. Ray Bamford, the chaplain to the BNP's youth movement and a well-known writer on racial issues for far-right magazines in both Britain and Germany, was chosen to link the two groups as vice-chairman of each. A veteran of the Scottish Conservative Party and a member of a variety of right-wing clubs and societies, Bamford was prized for his organisational capabilities and his list of contacts.

Acting as a co-ordinating body for local groups, whilst allowing its affiliates some degree of independence, the RPS, backed by Bamford's wealth, produced copious amounts of anti-immigration newsletters, ranging from the RPS News to regional titles such as the Sussex News and Midlands News. A number of its leading members, including Doyle, Ted Budden and Alan Hancock, shared a background as members of the British Union of Fascists before the Second World War.

== Activities ==
The movement functioned as a propaganda group without branching into politics (although individual members were free to join political parties) and provided extensive lists of conspiratorial books and pamphlets for sale. Of these the most extreme was Colin Jordan's Fraudulent Conspiracy, a work dealing with supposed conspiracy to control the world between international finance and Judaism. As well as publishing a number of books and pamphlets, the RPS also produced a regular newspaper, The Southern News, generally filled with horror stories about immigrants. The group accepted all types of members if they agreed on restricting immigration: thus, members of the Conservative Party were amongst early RPS activists before the group's true aims were clear. The RPS itself was never a political party and never attempted to organise as one.

== Merger attempts ==
A growing force, the RPS was approached by John Tyndall in early 1966, with a request that it should merge with his Greater Britain Movement and the BNP. The request was immediately rejected by the RPS, as the group had no desire to surrender its separate existence. Despite this, leading member David Brown did agree to work with the BNP under the new name of the National Democratic Party later that year. This plan broke down quickly, however, as Bean, who had been convinced of the need for unity, was uncomfortable at the thought of banning the GBM altogether whilst he also rejected Brown's insistence on being sole leader. Meanwhile, the elements of the RPS under Jimmy Doyle also withdrew from merger discussions, as Doyle had a personality clash with leading BNP men Bean and Philip Maxwell.

By this time, Beauclaire had become associated with the BNP, and when this group opened negotiations with the League of Empire Loyalists in late 1966, Beauclaire made it clear that he would bring a substantial group of RPS members into any new initiative. Beauclair and his followers made up a significant proportion of the 2,500 members that the new group, to be known as the National Front, claimed when it was brought into existence on 7 February 1967. By this time the RPS brought both international contacts and a number of rich backers to the NF, as well as its extensive experience of publishing. However, despite effectively throwing its lot in with the NF, the RPS continued its independent existence.

== Later years ==
The group was prosecuted under the Race Relations Act in 1968 at Lewes Crown Court when five members were brought up on charges of incitement to racial hatred for distributing the Society's Southern News. The case, which had initially been brought in 1967, saw the creation of a Free Speech Defence Committee which sought to raise funds for the "five British patriots" accused. However, they managed to argue that the articles attacking "race mixing" were intended only to educate politicians on the dangers of immigration and the case was dismissed. The articles for which the case was brought had been purposefully written in non-inflammatory prose, making prosecution difficult to ensure. Amongst those to testify on behalf of the defendants was Robert Gayre, the founder of the Mankind Quarterly. The case was a blow to the recently passed Race Relations Act 1968, under the terms of which the RPS were the first group to be charged, as it exposed the loopholes in the legislation. The following issue of the Southern News celebrated the win by adding the tagline "The Paper the Government Tried to Suppress" to its masthead.

By the 1970s, the RPS was controlled by members of the Northern League, who used it to publish the journal Race and Nation, with Budden, Denis Pirie and Alan and Anthony Hancock involved in this initiative. During the struggle between John Tyndall and John Kingsley Read for the leadership of the NF, and the subsequent emergence of the National Party, the RPS returned to some prominence, as Tyndall heavily featured the racial theories that the RPS was publishing in his magazine Spearhead, reasoning that the populists leading the NP had a reputation for being "soft" on the race issue amongst NF activists.
