= Derek Holland (activist) =

British far-right political figure

Derek Holland is a British far-right political figure noted for his Catholic Integralism.

Holland was brought up in Huntingdon and was already trying to recruit new members to the National Front while a student at Cambridgeshire College of Art and Technology. He then went to Leicester Polytechnic to study history and to bolster support for the already-established Young National Front Student Organisation. In the May 1979 general election, he contested Cambridge for the NF, receiving 311 votes (0.6%). After his studies Holland became closely associated with the Political Soldier wing of the party. One of the party's main writers in a time when their ideology was shifting, he contributed regularly not only to the party journal Nationalism Today, but was also co-editor of Rising, a radical nationalist journal that was independent of the NF and drew heavily from Julius Evola and Corneliu Zelea Codreanu. Holland became one of the leading lights on the Political Soldier wing of the party when his pamphlet The Political Soldier was published in 1984. Along with Nick Griffin and Patrick Harrington he became effective joint leader of the Official National Front following the resignation of Andrew Brons from overall leadership in 1984. In 1988, the three travelled to Libya on a fund-raising trip as official representatives of the NF, although in the end they were given only copies of The Green Book.

In 1989, Holland broke with Patrick Harrington and joined Michael Fishwick in following Nick Griffin and Roberto Fiore into the International Third Position (ITP) after Harrington had contacted The Jewish Chronicle with regard to opening dialogue. Holland injected his sympathies for anti-Zionist groups, as part of his nationalist philosophy, into the ITP. He supported the ideas of Muammar Gaddafi and Ayatollah Ruhollah Khomeini, who had previously featured on a cover of National Front News.

Holland's last public appearance was at a Swedish nationalist convention in 2002; during this time he lived in the Irish Midlands. Since that time the ITP appears to have gravitated towards the European National Front, and Holland has retired from active involvement in politics.

Holland has received considerable treatment in works on European extremist nationalism, including Fascism: A History by Roger Eatwell (1997) and Black Sun: Aryan Cults, Esoteric Nazism and the Politics of Identity by Nicholas Goodrick-Clarke (2002). Holland’s writings on the Political Soldier are also featured in Fascism: A Reader published by Oxford University Press (1995).

== Elections contested ==
Date of election	Constituency	Party	Votes	%
1979 general election	Cambridge	NF	311	0.6
