= Anthony Hancock (publisher) =

British neo-Nazi

- Hancock in Brighton, 1981
- Born: 5 May 1947
- Died: 11 June 2012 (aged 65)
- Occupation: Hotelier
- Known for: Publisher of far-right literature
- Political party: National Front
- Movement: League of St George
- Father: Alan Hancock

Anthony Hancock (5 May 1947 – 11 June 2012) was a publisher who created literature for British far right groups and a member of such organisations in the United Kingdom.

== Biography ==
Based in Brighton, where Hancock owned a hotel called the Heidelberg, Anthony Hancock was the son of Alan Hancock, a veteran of the British Union of Fascists who first set up the publishing firm. With his father as a leading member, Anthony Hancock began as a member of the Racial Preservation Society (RPS) and from this group he became a member of the National Front.

As a member of the NF, Hancock became a close associate of Steve Brady of the League of St George and followed him into the National Party in 1976. It was at this time that Hancock stepped up his printing firm and was soon producing not only for the NP and the League, but also for the British Movement and later the NF and the British National Party amongst others. He later became a supporter of the British Democratic Party, although by and large he put his own feelings aside and continued to publish for any far right group that asked him to.

A Holocaust denier, Hancock set up the Historical Review Press (based in Uckfield) which, funded by Robin Beauclair (formerly of the RPS), became the leading source of Holocaust denial publications in Britain. The Press published versions of a number of such works including Arthur Butz' The Hoax of the Twentieth Century and an occasional newspaper The Holocaust News. Hancock was responsible for publishing Did Six Million Really Die?, being sued for royalties in the High Court in 1982. David Irving has also acknowledged that Hancock did some of his printing, although it has been alleged that the relationship ran much deeper and that the two men worked together on Holocaust denial seminars. Hancock was also a leading member of the Clarendon Club, a debating society active from 1979 to 1981 in which Irving and members of the League of St. George were joined by more mainstream figures such as Harvey Proctor.

Hancock built up an extensive range of international contacts and was closely associated with Roberto Fiore for a time during the 1980s. Distributing large quantities of Holocaust denial material in Germany, he was investigated by the German police in the late 1990s, although no case was brought as he was not breaking UK law and so could not face extradition. His printing offices were raided in 1999, however, owing to a spate of antisemitic mailshots originating from Colin Jordan.

On 11 June 2012, Hancock died after suffering two strokes.
