= Political Soldier =

Concept in far-right politics

Political Soldier is a political concept associated with the Third Position. It played a leading role in Britain's National Front from the late 1970s onwards under young radicals Nick Griffin, Patrick Harrington and Derek Holland of the Official National Front. The term was used to indicate an almost fanatical devotion to the cause of nationalism, which its supporters felt was needed to bring about a revolutionary change in society.

A faction within the National Front called for the building of a fresh ethos within society and for the emergence of a new man, to be known as the Political Soldier, who would reject materialism and devote himself to the nationalist struggle with religious zeal. Basing their ideas on those of Julius Evola, an Italian philosopher who sought the creation of a new elite to combat the decadence of modern bourgeois society, Political Soldiers rejected traditional British nationalism in favour of a European outlook and a racialist equality of separate races.

== History ==
The idea of the Political Soldier, someone who devotes all his time and energy to the nationalist struggle, was one that had long existed on the far right in Europe. Jean-François Thiriart was amongst those to argue for this need for complete devotion from activists and had set up camps to train Political Soldiers in the 1960s.

Holland published The Political Soldier - A Statement in 1984. The pamphlet called on supporters to become consumed by their nationalism and to make it the driving force behind everything in their lives. The book offered four historical examples of a Political Soldier, i.e., the Spartans, the Roman Centurion, the Crusaders and the Iron Guard of Corneliu Zelea Codreanu, a Romanian movement of fascism and religion. The book also made the Celtic Cross the emblem of the Political Soldiers.

The concept of the Political Soldier caused divisions within the British far right as many of its ideas were new and alien concepts. The Official National Front was eventually removed from the NF and the calls for a 'new man' were continued by the International Third Position. Within the UK, the magazine Final Conflict is still devoted to this idea. Holland's book has been translated into a number of European languages (notably into Polish for the National Revival of Poland) whilst the term is still used by the National Democratic Party of Germany to describe its followers.

== Bibliography ==
- L. Cheles, R. Ferguson, and M. Vaughan, Neo-Fascism in Europe, London: Longman, 1992
- N. Copsey, Contemporary British Fascism: The British National Party and the Quest for Legitimacy, Basingstoke: Palgrave Macmillan, 2004
- D. Holland, The Political Soldier - A Statement, 1984
- M. A. Lee, The Beast Reawakens, London: Warner Books, 1997
