= National Front (UK) =

British fascist and white supremacist political party

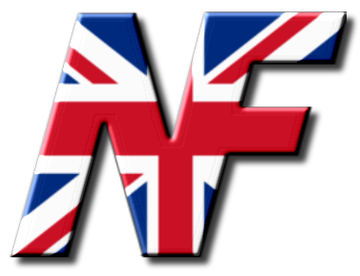
- Abbreviation: NF
- Leader: Tony Martin
- Founder: A. K. Chesterton
- Founded: 7 February 1967; 59 years ago
- Merger of: British National Party; League of Empire Loyalists
- Ideology: British fascism; Neo-fascism; British ultranationalism; White supremacy; Factions: Neo-Nazism; Racial populism; Strasserism; Third Position
- Political position: Far-right
- National affiliation: Nationalist Alliance (2005–2008)

Website
- natfront.info

The National Front (NF) is a far-right, fascist political party in the United Kingdom. It is currently led by Tony Martin. A minor party, it has never had its representatives elected to the British or European Parliaments, although it gained a small number of local councillors through defections and it has had a few of its representatives elected to community councils. Founded in 1967, it reached the height of its electoral support during the mid-1970s, when it was briefly England's fourth-largest party in terms of vote share.

The NF was founded by A. K. Chesterton, formerly of the British Union of Fascists, as a merger between his League of Empire Loyalists and the British National Party. It was soon joined by the Greater Britain Movement, whose leader John Tyndall became the Front's chairman in 1972. Under Tyndall's leadership it capitalised on growing concern about South Asian migration to Britain, rapidly increasing its membership and vote share in the urban areas of east London and northern England. Its public profile was raised through street marches and rallies, which often resulted in violent clashes with anti-fascist protesters, most notably the 1974 Red Lion Square disorders and the 1977 Battle of Lewisham. In 1982, Tyndall left the National Front to form a new British National Party (BNP). Many NF members defected to Tyndall's BNP, contributing to a substantial decline in the Front's electoral support. During the 1980s, the NF split in two; the Flag NF retained the older ideology, while the Official NF adopted a Third Positionist stance before disbanding in 1990. In 1995, the Flag NF's leadership transformed the party into the National Democrats, although a small splinter group retained the NF name.

Ideologically positioned on the extreme right or far-right of British politics, the NF has been characterised as fascist or neo-fascist by political scientists. Different factions have dominated the party at different times, each with its own ideological bent, including neo-Nazis, Strasserites and racial populists. The party espouses the ethnic nationalist view that only white people should be citizens of the United Kingdom. The NF calls for an end to non-white migration into the UK and for settled non-white Britons to be stripped of their citizenship and deported. A white supremacist party, it promotes biological racism and the white genocide conspiracy theory, calling for global racial separatism and condemning interracial relationships and miscegenation. It espouses anti-semitic conspiracy theories, endorsing Holocaust denial and claiming that Jews dominate the world through both communism and finance capitalism. It promotes economic protectionism, hard Euroscepticism and a transformation away from liberal democracy, while its social policies oppose feminism, LGBTQ rights and societal permissiveness.

After the BNP, the NF has been the most successful far-right group in British politics since the Second World War. During its history, it has established sub-groups such as a trade unionist association, a youth group and the Rock Against Communism musical organisation. Only whites are permitted membership of the party, and in its heyday most of its support came from white British working-class and lower middle-class communities in northern England and east London. The NF has generated vocal opposition from left-wing and anti-fascist groups throughout its history, and NF members are prohibited from various professions.

== History ==
=== Formation: 1966–1967 ===
The National Front began as a coalition of small far-right groups active on the fringes of British politics during the 1960s. The resolve to unite them came in early 1966 from A. K. Chesterton, the leader of the League of Empire Loyalists (LEL). He had a long history in the British fascist movement, having been a member of the British Union of Fascists (BUF) in the 1930s. Over the following months, many far-rightists visited Chesterton at his Croydon apartment to discuss the proposal, among them Andrew Fountaine and Philip Maxwell of the British National Party (BNP), David Brown of the Racial Preservation Society (RPS), and John Tyndall and Martin Webster of the Greater Britain Movement (GBM). Although everyone agreed with the idea of unification, personal rivalries made the process difficult.

Chesterton agreed to a merger of the LEL and BNP, and a faction of the RPS decided to join them. Chesterton and the BNP agreed that Tyndall's GBM would not be invited to join their new party because of its strong associations with neo-Nazism, as well as the recent arrest of Tyndall and seven other GBM members for illegal weapon possession. Chesterton wanted to keep his new party clear of the crude sloganeering he thought was holding back the far-right's electoral success; he later stated that "the man who thinks this is a war that can be won by mouthing slogans about 'dirty Jews' and 'filthy niggers' is a maniac whose place should not be in the National Front but in a mental hospital."

In October 1966, the LEL and BNP established a working committee to determine what policies they could agree on. The committee's initial policy platform revolved around opposition to Britain's political establishment, anti-communism, support for the white minority governments in Rhodesia and South Africa, a ban on migration into Britain and the expulsion of all settled non-white immigrants. They considered various names for the new party, before settling on "National Front" in December 1966. The National Front (NF) was founded on 7 February 1967, with Chesterton its first chairman. At the time it had approximately 2,500 members, of whom 1,000 were from the BNP, 300 from the LEL and over 100 from the RPS. The historian Richard Thurlow described the NF's formation as "the most significant event on the radical right and fascist fringe of British politics" since the internment of the country's fascists during the Second World War.

=== Early growth: 1968–1972 ===
The NF's first year was marked by a power struggle between the ex-LEL and ex-BNP factions. The former were unhappy with the behaviour of ex-BNP members, such as their propensity for political chanting, while the ex-BNP faction criticised Chesterton's elitist pretensions. At the invitation of the ex-BNP faction, in June 1967, Tyndall discontinued the GBM and called on its members to join the NF. Despite his own earlier commitment to keep Tyndall out, Chesterton welcomed him into the party. Tyndall's magazine, Spearhead—originally sold as "an organ of National Socialist [i.e. Nazi] opinion in Britain"—dropped its open neo-Nazism and backed the NF, eventually becoming the party's de facto monthly magazine.

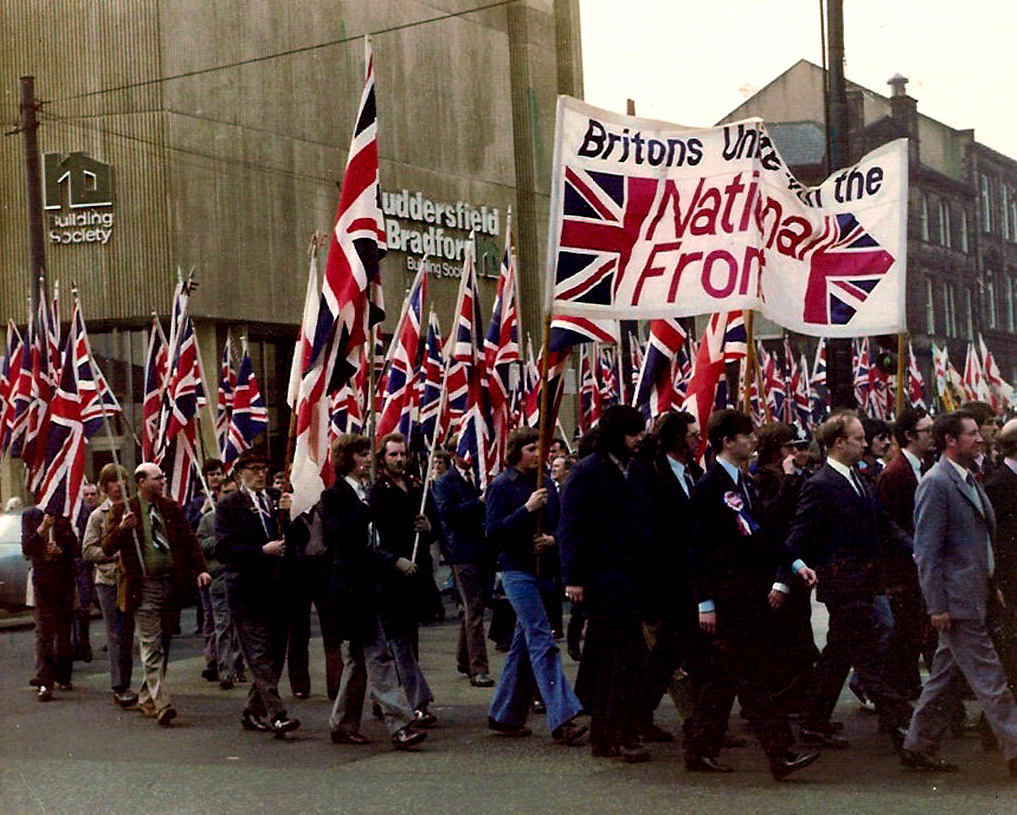
A National Front march in Yorkshire during the 1970s

The party held its first annual conference in October 1967; it was picketed by anti-fascists. In 1968, Chesterton's leadership was unsuccessfully challenged by Fountaine, who then left the party. There were further internal arguments after its lease on its Westminster headquarters ended. Ex-LEL members wanted another base in central London, while the ex-GBM and ex-BNP factions favoured moving into the GBM's old headquarters in Tulse Hill. Chesterton backed the ex-LEL position, and offered a small office in Fleet Street. In April 1968, immigration became the foremost political topic in the national media after the Conservative Party politician Enoch Powell made his Rivers of Blood speech, an appeal against non-white immigration into Britain. Although Powell proposed more moderate measures for expelling migrants than the NF, his use of language was similar to theirs, and some individuals on the right wing of the Conservatives defected to the NF.

The NF fielded 45 candidates in the 1969 local elections and averaged a poll of 8%, although a few secured over 10%. The party focused on these latter seats in the 1970 local elections, fielding 10 candidates; almost all received under 5% of the vote. The party faced militant left-wing opposition, including the driving of a lorry into its Tulse Hill building in 1969, and to counter this the NF installed a spy in London's anti-fascist movement. Against Chesterton's wishes, NF activists carried out publicity stunts: in 1968 they marched onto a London Weekend Television show uninvited and in 1969 assaulted two Labour Party ministers. While Chesterton was holidaying in South Africa, a faction led by Gordon Brown—formerly of Tyndall's GBM—launched a leadership challenge against him. On realising that his support was weak, Chesterton resigned. He was succeeded by John O'Brien in February 1971. Frustrated that Tyndall maintained links with neo-Nazi groups like the Northern League, O'Brien and his supporters ultimately left the NF for the National Independence Party in June 1972.

=== Tyndall's first leadership: 1972–1975 ===
I do not believe that the survival of the white man will be found through the crest of political respectability because I believe that respectability today means one thing, it means your preparedness to be a lackey of the establishment ... I don't want respectability if that is what respectability means, preparedness to surrender my own race, to hell with respectability if that is what it is.

— Tyndall's views on electoral respectability

Tyndall became party chairman in July 1972, centralising the NF's activities at a new Croydon headquarters. According to Thurlow, under Tyndall the NF attempted to "convert racial populists" angry about immigration "into fascists". In his history of fascism, Roger Eatwell noted that with Tyndall as chair, "the NF tried hard to hide its neo-Nazism from public view, fearing it might damage popular support." Refocusing its appeal towards the white working class, in June 1974 it launched the NF Trade Unionists Association. Britain's leftists fought back by publicising the neo-Nazi past of senior NF members, including photographs of Tyndall wearing a Nazi uniform.

The NF capitalised on fears surrounding the arrival of Ugandan Asian refugees in 1972, resulting in rapid growth of its membership. At the 1973 West Bromwich by-election it gained 16% of the vote, passing the 10% mark in a parliamentary election for the first time, something that brought greater media coverage. 54 candidates were fielded at the February 1974 general election, a number that guaranteed them a party political broadcast. It contested six times as many seats as in 1970, averaging a vote share of 3.2%, slightly less than in 1970. By the mid-1970s, the NF's membership had stagnated and in several areas declined; all of its 90 candidates for the October 1974 general election lost their deposits. In the 1975 local elections they fielded 60 candidates, far fewer than in previous elections.

A faction known as the "Populists" emerged in the party under Roy Painter's leadership. They were frustrated that the NF's directorate was dominated by former BNP and GBM members and believed that Tyndall remained a neo-Nazi. They ensured John Kingsley Read's election as chairman, with Tyndall demoted to vice chair. Growing strife between the Tyndallites and Populists broke out; Read and the executive committee suspended Tyndall and nine of his supporters from the directorate, before expelling Tyndall from the party. Tyndall took the issue to the High Court, where his expulsion was declared illegal. In frustration at their inability to eject Tyndall and the Tyndallites, Read and his supporters split from the NF to form the National Party (NP) in December 1975.

=== Tyndall's second leadership: 1976–1982 ===
In February 1976, Tyndall was restored as the NF leader. The party then capitalised on public anger at the government's agreement to accept Malawian Asian refugees, and held demonstrations against their arrival. After a resurgence in fortunes in London at the 1977 GLC election, when the party improved on its October 1974 general election result, further marches were planned in the city. These included a march through Lewisham in August 1977, where clashes with anti-fascists became known as the "Battle of Lewisham".

It should be the pride of all NF members to be called extremists and not only that – it should be a matter of guilt to any person opposed to the Left that he is not labelled as extreme.

— John Tyndall

In the 1979 general election, the NF contested more seats than any insurgent party since Labour in 1918; it nevertheless performed badly. This decline may have been due to increased anti-fascist campaigning over preceding years, or because of the Conservatives' increasingly restrictive stance on immigration under Margaret Thatcher attracted many votes that previously went to the Front. NF membership had also declined.

Although Tyndall and Webster had been longstanding comrades, in the late 1970s Tyndall began to blame his old friend for the party's problems. Tyndall was upset with Webster's attempts to encourage far-right skinheads and football hooligans to join the NF, as well as allegations that Webster had been making sexual advances toward the party's young men. In October 1979 he urged the NF directorate to call for Webster's resignation, but was refused. Tyndall resigned in January 1980, complaining of a "foul stench of perversion" in the party. In June, he founded the New National Front (NNF), which claimed that a third of the NF's membership defected to it.

=== Strasserites and the Flag Group: 1983–1990 ===
After Tyndall's departure, Andrew Brons became party chair, with Webster remaining as National Activities Organiser. Webster was ousted from all paid positions in 1983 by a faction led by Nick Griffin and Joe Pearce. In May 1985, this faction – who adhered to the Strasserite variant of Nazism – secured control of the party's directorate and suspended the membership of their opponents. Their focus was not on electoral success but on developing an activist elite consisting largely of working-class urban youths; its supporters became known as "Political Soldiers". The Strasserites officially reformulated their party along a centralised cadre system at the November 1986 AGM. Their ideology was influenced by their strong links with members of an Italian fascist militia, the Nuclei Armati Rivoluzionari (NAR), who were hiding in London after the Bologna massacre. Like the NAR, the NF Strasserites emphasised the far-right ideology of the Third Position, which they presented as being opposed to both capitalism and Marxist-oriented socialism. They were also influenced by the Nouvelle Droite, a French far-right movement that advocated long-term strategies of cultural influence to achieve their goals.

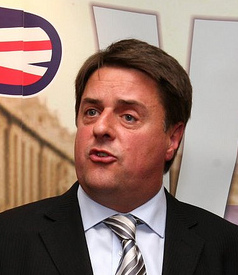
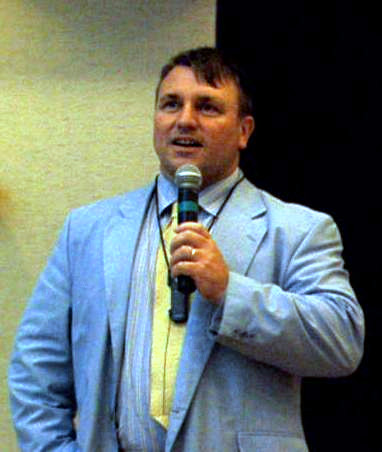
In 1983, the National Front was taken over by a faction led by Nick Griffin (left) and Joe Pearce (right), who were then followers of Strasserism.

The Strasserites described themselves as "radical, youthful and successful", contrasting their approach with the "out-dated conservative policies" of their internal opponents. These opponents then formed a rival organisation, the Flag Group, which adopted the name "National Front" in January 1987. According to Eatwell, the Flag NF "was essentially a continuation of the racial-populist tradition" used by earlier forms of the party. It had more working-class leaders than the Strasserite group and regarded the latter as intellectuals pursuing foreign ideological fads. There remained two organisations claiming the name of National Front—that controlled by the Flag Group and the Strasserites' Official National Front—until 1990. In contrast to the Strasserite NF's increased centralisation, the Flag Group gave autonomy to its branches, focusing on local issues. Following the NF's declining vote share in the late 1970s, both groups had effectively abandoned interest in electoral participation.

Reflecting the Nouvelle Droite's influence, the Strasserite Official NF promoted support for "a broad front of racialists of all colours" who were seeking an end to multi-racial society and capitalism, praising black nationalists like Louis Farrakhan and Marcus Garvey. Their publication, Nationalism Today, featured positive articles on the Libyan and Iranian governments, presenting them as part of a global anti-capitalist and anti-Marxist third force; they may have also seen Libya and Iran as potential sources of funding. This new ideology alienated many NF members. The Official NF experienced internal problems and in 1989 Griffin, Derek Holland and Colin Todd split from it to establish the International Third Position. In March 1990 the Official NF was disbanded by its leaders, Patrick Harrington, Graham Williamson and David Kerr, who replaced it with a new organisation, the Third Way. This left the Flag Group as the only party using the National Front banner.

=== Further decline: 1990–present ===
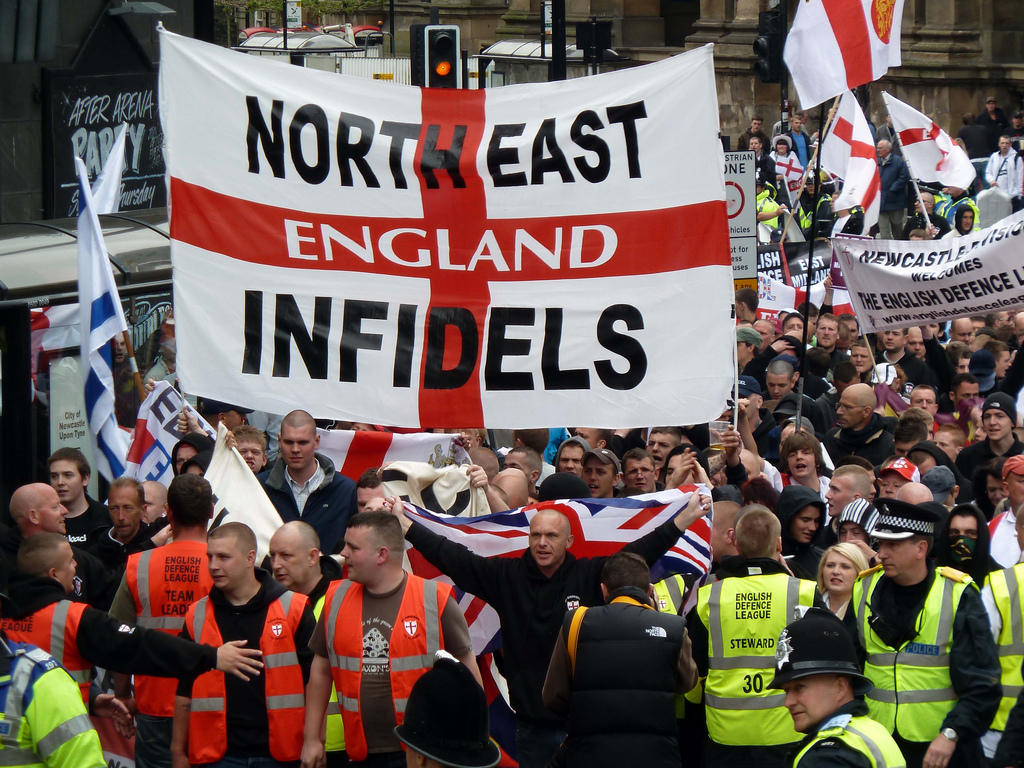
The National Front cooperated with the North West Infidels and South East Alliance, groups that splintered from the English Defence League (rally depicted).

During the 1990s, the NF was eclipsed by Tyndall's new British National Party (BNP) as Britain's foremost far-right movement. Following the Lansdowne Road football riot of 1995, in which English far-right hooligans attacked Irish supporters, the NF's chairman Ian Anderson attempted to escape the negative associations of the name "National Front" by renaming the party as the National Democrats. A small faction broke away to retain the National Front name, contesting the 1997 and 2001 general elections, with little success. By 2001, the NF had developed close links with Combat 18, a neo-Nazi paramilitary which had been founded by Tyndall's BNP before breaking from the latter. The Front continued to organise rallies, several of which were banned by successive Home Secretaries.

A 2010 High Court ruling forced the BNP to remove a clause from its constitution prohibiting non-white membership, leading to defections to the NF. After the English Defence League (EDL), an Islamophobic social movement, emerged in 2009, the NF pursued links but was rebuffed by the EDL, which sought to distance itself from the Front and other established far-right groups. As the EDL declined in the following years, the NF collaborated with some of the groups that had split from it, like the North West Infidels and South East Alliance. In March 2015 Kevin Bryan became the NF's chair. After Bryan was injured in a car accident he was replaced by Dave MacDonald in November 2015, with Tony Martin taking over in September 2018. According to The Guardian, the National Front was defunct by 2026.

== Ideology ==
=== Far-right politics, fascism and neo-Nazism ===
It is interesting that the NF […] has tried to develop a 'two-track' strategy. On the one hand it follows an opportunistic policy of attempting to present itself as a respectable political party appealing by argument and peaceful persuasion for the support of the British electorate. On the other, its leadership is deeply imbued with Nazi ideas and though they try to play down their past affiliations with more blatantly Nazi movements, such as Colin Jordan's National Socialist Movement, they covertly maintain intimate connections with small neo-Nazi cells in Britain and abroad, because all their beliefs and motives make this not only tactically expedient but effective.

— Paul Wilkinson, 1981

A far-right or extreme-right party, the NF has both commonalities and differences with older far-right groups. Political scientists and historians characterise it as fascist, or neo-fascist, with the historian Martin Durham stating that the NF—like France's National Front and Germany's The Republicans—represented "the direct descendants of classical fascism". The political psychologist Michael Billig notes that the NF displayed many of fascism's recurring traits: an emphasis on nationalism and racism, an anti-Marxist stance, statism and support for private enterprise, and a hostile view of democracy and personal freedom.

Rejecting the term "fascist" to describe itself, the NF sought to conceal its connections to older fascist movements, denying its leaders' previous fascist activities. It claimed that it could not be fascist because it took part in elections; the political scientist Stan Taylor argues that this claim was obsolete, for many earlier fascist parties—including the BUF, the German Nazi Party and the Italian National Fascist Party—also contested elections. In avoiding the "fascist" label, the NF was typical of fascist groups operating after the Second World War; having to contend with the legacy of the war and the Holocaust, they tried to hide their intellectual pedigrees from voters.

As with many political extremists, the image the NF presented to the public was more moderate than the ideology of its inner core of members. As noted by Billig, the NF's "ideological core and its genocidal tendencies, are hidden" so as not to scare off potential recruits sympathetic to its nationalism and anti-immigration stance but not its antisemitic conspiracy theories. While noting that the party's views on race departed considerably "from what is normal or acceptable to the average citizen" in the UK, the political scientist Nigel Fielding observes that many of its other views were grounded in what would be considered "popular common-sense opinion" across the political right.

==== Factions ====
During its history, the NF contained various factions with distinct ideological positions. From the party's early days until the 1980 Tyndall/Webster split, its ideology was dominated by the ex-GBM faction. According to Thurlow, the ex-GBM faction oversaw "an attempt to portray the essentials of Nazi ideology in more rational language and seemingly reasonable arguments", while Wilkinson observed that this faction's leadership was "deeply imbued with Nazi ideas" and retained "intimate connections" with both domestic and foreign neo-Nazi groups. Taylor also regarded the NF of the 1970s as a Nazi organisation because of its fixation on antisemitic conspiracy theories. In his words, the NF's "full ideology" was, "in a large number of respects", identical to the original German Nazism.

According to Thurlow, the members of the "Populist" faction that challenged the ex-GBM faction's dominance in the late 1970s were "pseudo-Conservative racial populists", representing the party's "non-fascist and ostensibly more democratic element". After Tyndall and Webster were ousted and replaced by Brons and Anderson, a new faction took control whose members regarded themselves as Strasserite, drawing inspiration from German Nazi Party members Otto Strasser and Gregor Strasser. This faction embraced the Third Position ideology and drew inspiration from Muammar Gaddafi's Third International Theory.

=== Ethnic nationalism, racism and eugenics ===
The National Front is a British nationalist party; its early policy statements declared that it "pledged to work for the restoration of full national sovereignty for Britain in all affairs". It rejected internationalism and thus opposed both liberalism and communism, contrasting their internationalist espousal of universal values with its view that nations should have their own distinct values. Labelling itself a racial nationalist party, the NF's concept of nationalism was bound up with that of race. NF members typically referred to themselves as "racialists", with Durham stating that the NF was "undeniably a racist organisation". The party claimed that humanity divides into biologically distinct races with their own physical and social characteristics. Although some of its published material referred only to "white" and "black" races, elsewhere it listed various racial groups, among them the "Nordics", "Caucasoids", "Negroids", "Semites" and "Turco-Armonoids". It claimed that within racial groups can be found "nations", a form of "race within a race"; many party activists nevertheless used the terms "race" and "nation" interchangeably.

The essential facet of nationalism in the NF ideology is the belief that Britain forms an entity that cannot be dismantled without irreparable harm and that the maintenance of British culture requires the exclusion of outsiders.

— Political scientist Nigel Fielding, 1981

The NF claimed the existence of a distinct British racial "nation", all the members of which shared common interests; Welsh and Scottish nationalisms were condemned as threats to British racial unity. It viewed class as a false distinction among the British nation, rejecting the concept of class war as "nonsense", and—like most fascist groups—tried to attract support across class boundaries. For the NF, patriotism was deemed essential to the cohesion of the British nation, with nationalism regarded as a vital component of patriotism. Members regarded themselves as patriots, and the party made heavy use of British patriotic symbols like the Union Flag and Remembrance Day.

Fielding believed that the "dialectic of insiders and outsiders" was the "linchpin of its ideology", and noted that the NF's "rigid boundaries between in-group and out-group" were typical of the far-right. In its 1974 electoral manifesto, the NF called for a "vigorous birth-rate" among the white British, claiming that any ensuing overpopulation of the UK could be resolved by emigration to the British Commonwealth. Tyndall defended Nazi Germany's lebensraum policy, and under his leadership the NF promoted imperialist views about expanding British territory to create "living space" for the country's growing population. The party also promoted eugenics, calling for the improvement of the quality as well as the quantity of the white British people. Under Tyndall, it called for the sterilisation of those with genetically transmittable disabilities. By 2011, the party's website was utilising the Fourteen Words slogan: "We must secure the existence of our people and a future for white children."

=== White supremacism ===
A white supremacist party, the NF rejected the concept of racial equality. It argued that different races can be ranked hierarchically based on differing abilities, and that the "higher races" compete for world domination. It believed that racial segregation was natural and ordained by God, but that non-whites had been encouraged to migrate to Britain and other white-majority countries to breed with the indigenous inhabitants and thus bring about "white genocide" through assimilation. It opposed inter-racial marriage and miscegenation—typically referring to the latter as "mongrelisation"—and displayed particular anxiety about black men seducing white women. It claimed its racial prejudice arose from a natural desire for racial preservation rather than hatred of other races.

The NF claimed that most non-white racial groups were inferior to "Caucasoids and Mongoloids". In the mid-1970s, Tyndall used Spearhead to claim that "the negro has a smaller brain and a much less complex cerebral structure" than whites; in the early 1980s, Nationalism Today carried articles maintaining that black Africans had lower average IQs than whites and thus were unfit "to go to white schools" or "live in white society". Its published material presented black people as dirty and unhygienic, infected with disease and incapable of governing themselves. Spearhead featured references to black people being cannibals; at least one article claimed they ate dirt and faeces.

The NF sought academic support for its views, placing great importance on scientific racist publications. Its booklist offered academic and quasi-academic books endorsing scientific racism; early party literature often referenced the work of Hans Eysenck, William Shockley, Arthur Jensen and Richard Herrnstein, while Spearhead and other NF publications repeatedly cited articles from the Mankind Quarterly. In citing these studies, the party claimed that its views were scientific, although Fielding observed that the NF's racial views relied "as much on blind assertion, on faith, as on 'scientific' sources".

=== Anti-immigrationism and repatriation ===
The cornerstone of the Front's manifesto since 1974 has been the compulsory deportation of all non-white immigrants and their descendants, as well as the white British partners in mixed-race relationships. It stated that the "repatriation" process could take ten years, adding that before deportation, non-whites would be stripped of British citizenship and placed behind white Britons when it came to access to welfare, education and housing. It accompanied this with a call to prohibit future non-white migration to Britain. In the 1970s the NF stated that it did not oppose the arrival of white immigrants from Commonwealth countries, but called for "firm controls" on the migration of whites from elsewhere.

The NF upholds the wish of the majority of the British people for Britain to remain a White country and for this reason opposes all coloured immigration into Britain. It further advocates the repatriation, by the most humane means possible, of those coloured immigrants already here, together with their descendants and dependants.

— The NF's Statement of Policy

During its first decade, the party emphasised the claim that it was the politicians who enabled immigration—rather than migrants themselves—who were to blame. In 1969, it stated: "Your enemies are not the coloured immigrants, but the British government which let them come in hundreds of thousands." It claimed that Labour had promoted migration to boost their vote and that Conservatives had seen migrants as cheap labour. Its early publications generally avoided derogatory terms for non-whites like "wog" or "nigger", although such language appeared at party rallies. As it developed, the NF press included racially inflammatory headlines like "Black Savages Terrorize Old Folk" and "Asians Import Bizarre Sex-Murder Rites", also comparing non-white migrants to vermin by describing areas as "immigrant-infested".

The NF linked other issues to race and immigration, targeting concerns among the white British about immigrants being competition for jobs, housing and welfare. Common NF claims included that immigrants carried diseases like leprosy and tuberculosis, that they were a burden on the National Health Service (NHS), and that incompetent migrant staff were detrimental to the NHS. It claimed that immigrants evaded taxes and that they were arrogant, aggressive and unhygienic in the workplace. It maintained that blacks were a source of crime, and that black pupils eroded school quality.

=== Antisemitism and Holocaust denial ===
The NF is antisemitic. It claimed that Jews form a biologically distinct race—one of the world's "higher races"—and that they seek to destroy the white "Caucasoid" race. The Front alleged that a Jewish cabal orchestrated non-white migration into Britain, hoping to weaken the white race through racial mixing, as well as through internationalism and encouraging internal division. The party propagated the conspiracy theory that Jews did this to plunge other "higher races" in disarray so that they would be left dominant. As mentioned in Spearhead, this achieved, "the Jewish nation would be the only surviving ethnically identifiable population group amid a mongrelised world population", the latter being easier for Jews to control. This conspiracy theory owed much to the 19th-century Russian antisemitic forgery Protocols of the Elders of Zion, and was previously articulated by the BUF. Whereas the BUF explicitly claimed Jews were behind this global conspiracy, the NF were aware of considerable public disapproval of antisemitism following the Holocaust so used code-words and dogwhistles such as "Money Power", "internationalist", "cosmopolitan", "alien", "rootless", "shifty", "money-lenders" and "usurers" instead of "Jews".

In the 1970s, the NF denied it was "antisemitic". Instead, the party called itself "anti-Zionist", and claimed to oppose "Zionists" rather than all Jews. Within the NF, the word "Zionism" was not used in the commonly understood manner, which is to describe the ideology promoting the formation of a Jewish state, but rather applied to the alleged Jewish cabal secretly manipulating the world. For instance, one issue of Spearhead stated that "the twin evils of International Finance and International Communism" are "perhaps better described as International Zionism". Fielding observed that party members used the term "Zionist" indiscriminately, often against any critics.

Many of the Front's central members, among them Chesterton, Tyndall and Webster, had long histories of antisemitism before joining the party. For instance, in 1963, Tyndall claimed that "Jewry is a world pest wherever it is found in the world today. The Jews are more clever and more financially powerful than other people and have to be eradicated before they destroy the Aryan peoples." In an early edition of Spearhead, Tyndall stated: "if Britain were to become Jew-clean she would have no nigger neighbours to worry about ... It is the Jews who are our misfortune: T-h-e J-e-w-s. Do you hear me? THE JEWS?" While some of its senior members had previously called for a genocide of the Jews, the party itself engaged in Holocaust denial, referring to the Holocaust as "the six million myth". It is possible that most senior NF figures were aware that the Holocaust really happened, but denied its occurrence for tactical reasons, hoping that the spread of Holocaust denial would facilitate a more positive attitude toward Nazi Germany among Britain's population.

=== Government and the state ===
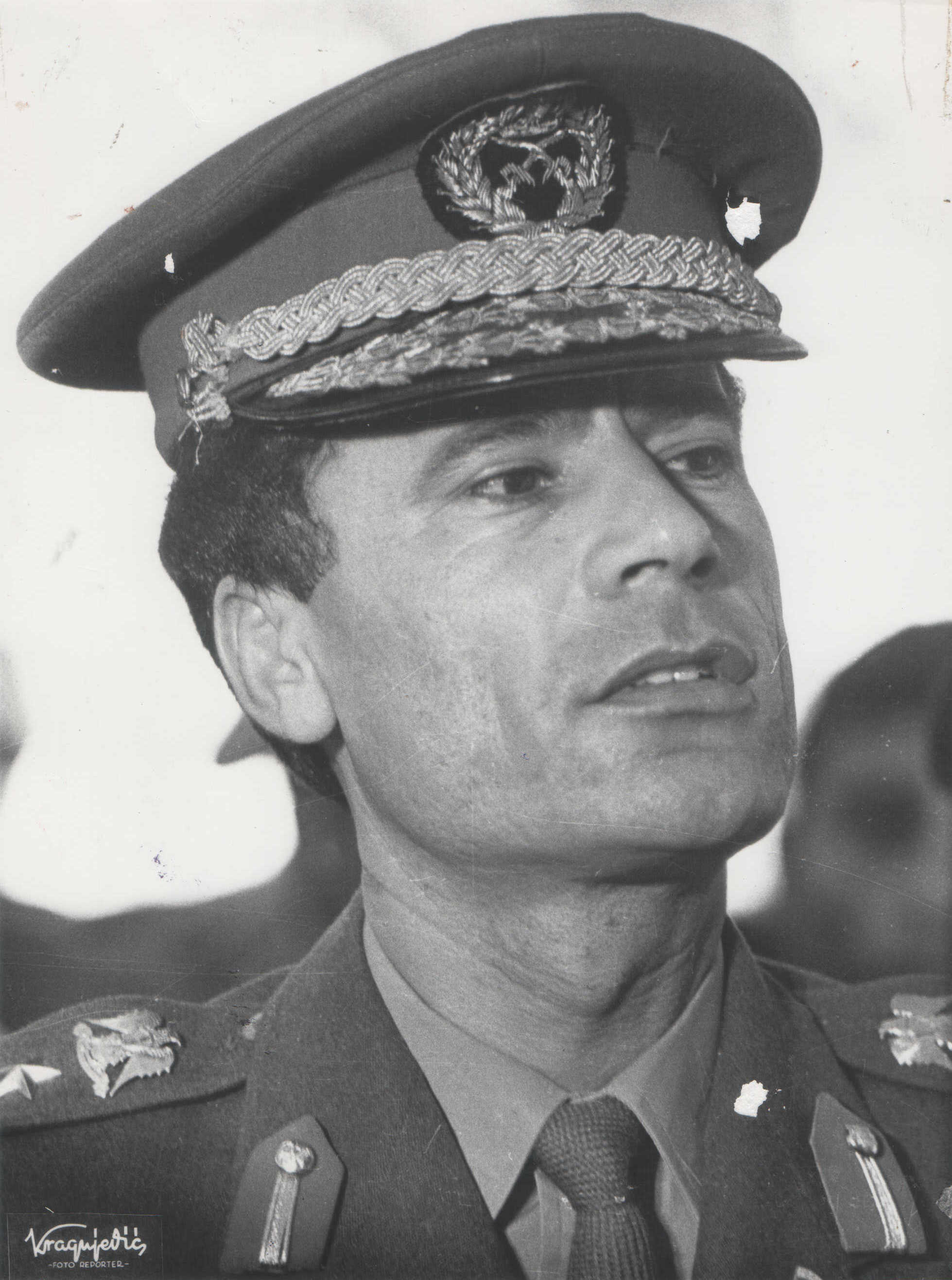
When the Strasserite faction took control of the National Front in the 1980s, it based its views of a future government on the ideas in The Green Book of Muammar Gaddafi (pictured).

During the 1970s, the Front alleged that the UK's liberal democracy was "bogus democracy" and declared that it would forge "a genuinely democratic political system", utilising referendums on major issues. In making claims such as that "true democracy is that which is representative of the will of the people", the NF espoused populist rhetoric. Fielding nevertheless believed that "the essence of the NF ideology is incompatible with democracy" and instead reflected an "elitist tendency" at odds with its "populist rhetoric".

The NF saw democracy as a luxury that was subordinate to the preservation of the nation. In Spearhead, Tyndall stated that although he would support parliamentary democracy if he thought it in the national interest, "the survival, and the national recovery of Britain stand as top priority over all. We will support whatever political methods are necessary to attain that end." He called for governance by a strong leader, an individual unencumbered by political parties and elections so that they could focus on the national interest rather than the interests of sub-groups or short-term considerations. In Spearhead, Tyndall stated that "it is only in banana republics, where the 'sophisticated' Western institutions of a multi- or two-party system, powerful trade unions and a 'free' press have not yet taken root, that there is still scope for men of real personality and decision to emerge and truly lead." Fielding believed that had the NF achieved political office it would have marginalised parliament and governed in a totalitarian manner.

Under its Strasserite leadership during the 1980s, the NF adopted a different position on governance, influenced heavily by the Third International Theory propounded by Libya's leader Muammar Gaddafi in The Green Book. It promoted the establishment of communal political structures, with street councils, area councils, county councils and a National People's Council "for each of the British Nations". In its view of this future, the British population would be armed and trained in military tactics, allowing for the establishment of local militias rather than a state-controlled professional army.

=== International institutions and relations ===
Regarding international institutions as part of the Jewish conspiracy's plan for a one world government, the Front opposed UK membership of the United Nations and the European Economic Community (EEC). To replace the EEC, the NF called for stronger UK links with the "White countries" of the British Commonwealth, namely Canada, Australia and New Zealand, but also the white-minority governments of Rhodesia and South Africa. According to the Front, this would "strengthen the ethnic, cultural and family ties between peoples of British stock all over the world". It stated that an NF-led UK would not remain allied to the United States because the latter was dominated by the Jewish conspiracy, and called for withdrawal from the North Atlantic Treaty Organisation, with Britain instead boosting its defensive capabilities through nuclear weaponry.

During the 1970s, the Front was British unionist, advocating for the unity of the United Kingdom. From the late 1960s onward, it supported the Ulster Unionists, deeming Irish republicanism a communist conspiracy to undermine British unity. The NF argued that the UK had been too soft in dealing with militant Irish republicans; it argued that military courts should replace civil ones, that Provisional Irish Republican Army members should be interned and that those guilty of sabotage or murder should be executed. In the early 1970s it alleged that the Irish Republic was harbouring republican militants, "an act of war" that required trade sanctions. In that decade the NF endorsed the Vanguard Unionist Progressive Party, but many Ulster Unionists were suspicious of the NF; in 1973 the Ulster Defence Association proscribed it as "a neo-Nazi movement". In 1985 – by which time Strasserites dominated the party – the NF called on Northern Ireland to declare independence in response to the Anglo-Irish Agreement.

=== Economic policy ===
During the 1970s, the Front identified as neither capitalist nor socialist, advocating an economic system drawing on both. It endorsed private enterprise but rejected laissez-faire capitalism, claiming that the latter places the interests of business above that of the nation. It promoted economic nationalism, calling for maximum national self-sufficiency and a rejection of international free trade. By this approach it wished to separate Britain from the international financial system, which it believed was controlled by the Jewish conspiracy. It opposed foreign ownership of British industry, endorsing protectionist and monetarist policies, advocating the state control of banking and financial services, and calling for a state bank to provide interest-free loans to fund municipal housing construction. These economic views were common across Britain's far-right, being akin, for example, to those of the BUF.

After the Strasserite faction took control in the 1980s, the NF adopted distributist policies, maintaining the emphasis on an economic system neither capitalist nor socialist. In the party's material from 1980, it claimed that "Capitalism and Communism" were "twin evils" to be overcome by "Revolutionary Nationalism". In keeping with the Strasserites' distributism, the 1980s NF called for large business and industry to be redistributed into a tripartite system: small privately owned enterprises, workers' co-operatives and, in the case of financial institutions and heavy industry, nationalised enterprises. To solve unemployment, the party stated that it would encourage urban-to-rural migration, with heavily mechanised agriculture being replaced by small, labour-intensive farms.

=== Social issues ===
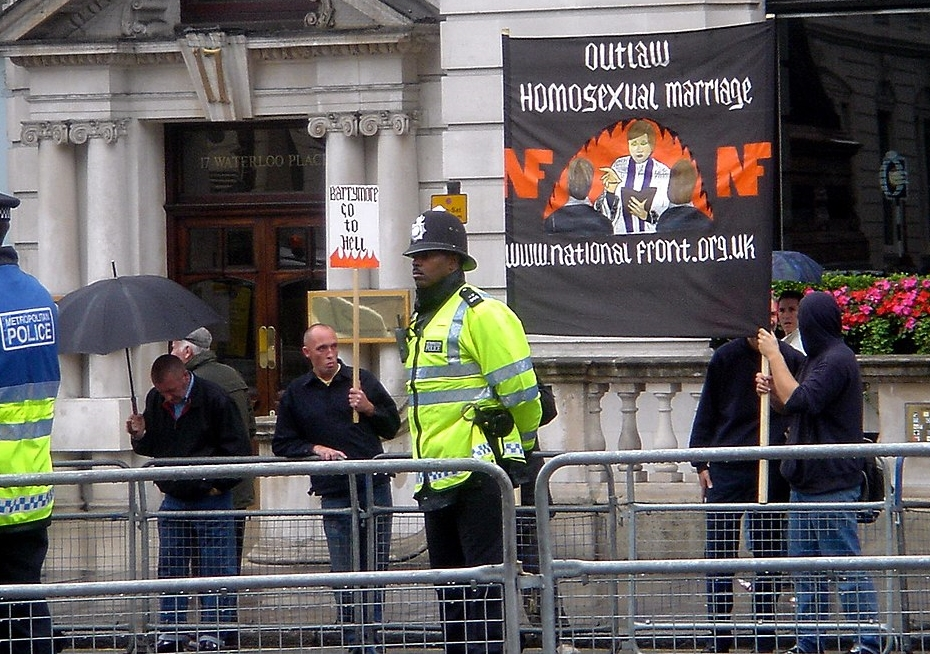
National Front members protesting against growing legal recognition of LGBT rights at the London LGBT Pride march in 2007. The party has tried to protest against various Pride parades in the past.

The NF adopted a strong stance against liberal and socially permissive policies, claiming that what it perceived as the growing permissiveness of British society was orchestrated by the Jewish conspiracy. Tyndall called for a moral "regeneration" penetrating "every sphere of work and leisure", including prohibitions on "art, literature or entertainment by which public moral standards might be endangered". Although placing little importance on religion, during the 1970s, the party claimed that God had set forth absolute moral values.

The party opposed changes to traditional gender roles. Spearhead stated that the NF saw "the feminine role as principally one of wife, mother and home maker". In the party's first year, it largely ignored the 1967 Abortion Act that legalised abortion, although by 1974 had adopted an anti-abortion stance, stating that abortions should only be legal in medical emergencies. According to Tyndall, the legalisation of abortion was part of a conspiracy to reduce white British births. The issue decreased in resonance within the party during the early 1980s but was re-emphasised when the Strasserites took control. The party condemned homosexuality, mixed-race marriages, and prostitution.

To survive, we've got to become a virile and competitive society. We've got to be a society that demands from its members duty and effort. We've got to be a society that encourages the fit and the strong — a society that instils into its young people from the cradle that nothing worthwhile is ever achieved, either by individuals or by nations, except by work and struggle. We've got to dedicate ourselves to producing, as we used to, young men who are tough and hard.

— NF Chairman John Tyndall

In the 1970s the NF claimed that the teaching profession was full of "communists", and stated that under an NF government all teachers deemed unsuitable would be fired. That decade, it stressed that education should be suited to the varying abilities of students although did not outright condemn comprehensive schooling. It called for greater emphasis on examinations and sporting competitions, with a rejection of "slapdash Leftwing-inspired teaching fads". It stated that it would emphasise the teaching of British history to encourage patriotism while expanding science and technology in the curriculum at the expense of the social sciences.

The Front exalted self-sufficiency, asserting that the individual should be willing to serve the state and that citizens' rights should be subordinate to their duties. During the 1970s, the Front criticised the UK's welfare state, stating that it wanted to end the perception of the UK as a "loafer's paradise". From its early years the NF promoted a tough stance on law and order, calling for harsher criminal sentencing, tougher prisons, and the reintroduction of both capital punishment, and national service. Emphasising self-responsibility, it rejected the idea that an individual's misdeeds should be attributed to their societal background.

== Organisation and structure ==
=== Leadership and branches ===
During its 1970s heyday, the National Front was headed by its directorate, a body of between seven and 20 party members. With strict control over local and regional organisations, the directorate determined party policy, controlled its structures and finances, oversaw admissions and expulsions, and determined tactics. A third of the directorate were required to stand down every year, with a postal ballot of the membership to determine their replacements. Between 1971 and 1975, the directorate elected two of its members to be the chairman and deputy chairman. However, at the 1977 annual general meeting it agreed—at Tyndall's instigation—that the chairman would instead be elected through a postal ballot of the membership. As the directorate met in London infrequently, in practice the running of the party was left to the chairman and deputy chairman.

One variant of the National Front flag

The NF's local presence divided into "groups", which had under twelve members, and "branches", which had over twelve. Fielding stated that in July 1973 the party had 32 branches and 80 groups, while the journalist Martin Walker claimed that in January 1974, it had 30 branches and 54 groups. Most were in south-east England, with 11 branches and 8 groups in Greater London and 5 branches and 22 groups elsewhere in the south-east. It had 5 branches and 3 groups in the Midlands, 7 branches and 11 groups in the north, 1 branch and 7 groups in western Britain and 1 group each in Scotland and Northern Ireland. Each branch or group had its own five-person committee, with annual elections for the committee positions. Typically taking place in pubs, branch meetings focused largely on practical issues like raising finances. Some NF branches established supporters' associations for sympathisers unwilling to become members. Supporter organisations were established elsewhere in the world; in New Zealand in 1977 and in Australia, Canada and South Africa in 1978. In April 1974, the party introduced regional councils to co-ordinate between the national party and its local groups and branches.

After the Strasserite faction secured control in 1986, it formally adopted a cadre system of leadership. This made the party more elitist, creating what the Strasserites called "a revolutionary cadre party; a movement run by its most dedicated and active members rather than by armchair nationalists". This was linked to the idea that each NF member should be a "political soldier", a "New Type of Man" who rejected the "materialist nightmare" of contemporary capitalist society and underwent a personal "Spiritual Revolution" to dedicate themselves fully to the nation.

=== Security and violence ===
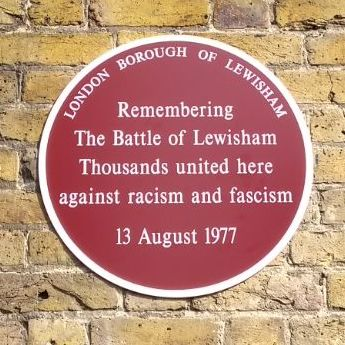
Plaque memorialising the "Battle of Lewisham" in which anti-fascist protesters combatted a National Front march in 1977

Preoccupied with security, during the 1970s, the Front created a file of its opponents' names and addresses. To guard its marches, it formed "defence groups"—later called the "Honour Guard"—who often carried makeshift weapons. These marches often took place in areas with high migrant populations to instil fear in the latter, whip up racial tensions and generate publicity. These tactics have continued into more recent times. Local authorities sometimes banned its marches; in 2012, Aberdeen City Council rejected the NF's request to hold a procession on Adolf Hitler's birthday. The NF also disrupted anti-fascist and mainstream political meetings. In 1975, NF activists attacked a National Council of Civil Liberties meeting, with eight people requiring hospitalisation; in another instance they stormed a Liberal Party meeting discussing the transition to black-majority rule in Rhodesia, chanting "White Power".

The Front claimed that its members only resorted to violence in self-defence, although in the 1970s Fielding observed the group using force "aggressively". Fielding believed the most notable violent clash involving the NF was the Red Lion Square disorders in June 1974, during which an anti-fascist protester, Kevin Gateley, was killed. Another prominent clash took place in Lewisham in August 1977, when Trotskyist groups attacked the NF marchers, resulting in the "Battle of Lewisham". In April 1979, an anti-NF demonstration in Southall clashed with police, resulting in the death of Blair Peach.

There have also been actions where covert NF involvement was suspected but not proven. For instance, in 1974, several men put up NF posters in Brighton, assaulted individuals they accused of being Jewish and attacked the Communist Party of Britain (Marxist–Leninist) bookshop. The local NF branch denied involvement. In June 1978, the Anti-Nazi League headquarters was hit by an arson attack; the slogan "NF Rules OK" was graffitied on the building. The NF denied responsibility. The party's leadership showed little concern with the violence of its members and supporters, and openly praised some of its members convicted for violent activity.

=== Sub-groups and propaganda output ===
The NF formed various sub-groups. In 1974, it launched the NF Trade Unionists Association, and issued a short-lived trade unionist magazine, The British Worker. During the 1970s, it encouraged members to infiltrate other groups, such as the Hunt Saboteurs Association and ratepayers' and residents' associations, through which to promote the NF. In 1978, the party's directorate established a legal department to deal with the growing number of members being charged with inciting racial hatred under the 1976 Race Relations Act. Also in the 1970s, it formed a Student Association, and issued the student magazine Spark. The NF Student Association initially tried recruiting students at universities, but later refocused attention towards schools and sixth forms. In 1978 it launched the Young National Front (YNF): membership was restricted to 14- to 25-year-olds. The YNF issued a newsletter, Bulldog, and organised a football competition between YNF teams.

Are we gonna sit and let them come?
Have they got the white man on the run?
Multi-racial society is a mess.
We ain't gonna take much more of this

— Skrewdriver, "White Noise", the first song released by the NF's White Noise Records

The NF observed how the left mobilised anti-fascist support through musical ventures like Rock Against Racism and decided to employ similar techniques. In 1979, Pearce—then the YNF leader—established Rock Against Communism (RAC), through which the NF held concerts featuring neo-Nazi skinhead bands. Tyndall and other senior NF members liked the opportunity for expanding party membership that RAC offered them, but were concerned that associations with the skinhead subculture would damage the NF's image. After Tyndall left the party, in 1982 RAC was revived with Skrewdriver as its flagship band. In 1983 the NF launched a record label, White Noise Records, which became an important source of revenue for several years. The RAC had difficulty finding venues willing to stage its concerts and in 1984 got around this by staging its first large open-air concert at the Suffolk home of Nick Griffin's parents. Later in the 1980s, Skrewdriver broke from the NF to establish its own far-right music promotion network, Blood & Honour.

== Support ==
There was regional variation in the support that the NF received during the 1970s, reflected both in its vote share and the size and number of its branches. Paralleling the earlier support of the BUF, the NF's strength was centred heavily in England; its support was far weaker in Wales, Scotland and Northern Ireland. In England, its support clustered along the South Coast and in London and Birmingham.

=== Finances ===
The National Front was not open about its finances, but often stressed that it was short of funds. It is likely that in its heyday, it had just enough money to pay for its two full-time officials, three head office secretaries and party expenses. Its central funds came from several sources: membership dues, the sale of its publications, donations, and lotteries. Donations were requested at rallies and meetings, and also provided by wealthy supporters, some from abroad. Branches were expected to finance their own candidates in election campaigns, raising funds from jumble sales and social events.

=== Membership ===
==== Numbers ====
The NF faced a high membership turnover. In 1977, Walker described its membership as being "like a bath with both taps running and the plughole empty. Members pour in and pour out." Fielding echoed this, stating that the NF's "stable membership" was lower than the number of people who have "passed through" it; Taylor suggested that during the 1970s, "at least 12,000" people joined and then left. Many of those attracted to the party because of its anti-immigrationism may have departed on discovering its fascist ideology. In other cases, individuals may have left because the hardship they encountered — social ostracism, job losses, verbal abuse and, on rare occasions, assault — became too much to endure, particularly as the party's fortunes declined in the latter 1970s.

The Front refused to disclose the number of members that it had. Thurlow suggested that "the most reliable estimates" were produced by the anti-fascist magazine Searchlight. Searchlight claimed that from its origins with 4,000 members in 1968, the party reached a peak membership of 17,500 in 1972, which had declined to 10,000 in 1979, to 3,148 in 1984 and to 1,000 in 1985. An estimate of party membership in 1989 put adherents of the Flag Group at about 3,000 and of the Strasserite faction at about 600. Even at its 1970s peak, the Front's membership was half that of the BUF during its 1930s heyday.

==== Profile ====
No adequate sociological sampling of NF members took place, but interviews with members were conducted during the 1970s by Taylor, Fielding and Billig. Max Hanna noted that as of 1973, most NF members were "from the skilled working class and lower-middle class" but with variation among branches. Fielding observed that party activism was generally carried out by upper working- and lower middle-class members rather than by their lower working-class and upper middle-class counterparts. Fielding also noted that the party contained individuals of all age ranges, although added that men in their thirties and fifties predominated over those in their forties, suggesting that the latter were typically preoccupied with raising families.

While the party attracts significant numbers of working-class people the role they play in the branch is contingent on their political ability and zeal, and there is no doubt that it is those drawn from the upper ranks of the working class who predominate... It is noticeable that the more sedentary members at branch level are those drawn from the lower middle-class and the few remaining elderly upper middle-class members.

— Fielding, on the class composition of NF branches, 1981

Fielding found that NF members were sensitive to ideas that they were "fascistic" or "cranky", instead regarding themselves as "patriots" or "nationalists". He noted that race was the main issue that led members to join the NF, that they perceived their racial ideas to be "common sense", and that they expressed harsh prejudices against non-white Britons. A common perception among members was that life had changed for the worse in Britain, often outlined by the expression: "the country is going to the dogs". The members Fielding encountered widely perceived Britain's political leaders as corrupt and cruel and tended to believe conspiracy theories.

Fielding believed that some of the membership were "motivated by a search for community and reassurance in a world they find difficult to understand". For some, joining the NF was a psychological act of defiance against society, while many joined because friends and relatives had done so. Fielding suggested that the NF's moral indignation regarding perceived slackers and anti-social elements had particular appeal for upper working and lower middle-class Britons because these were the sectors of society which felt that they worked hardest for the least reward.

During the 1970s, the NF attempted to attract youth through new sub-groups. Many young people attracted to the group may have done so as a form of youthful rebellion, enjoying the "shock value" that membership offered; in this, they had similarities with the late 1970s punk movement. Ryan Shaffer stated that the party's shift away from traditional campaigning during the 1980s and its growing affiliation with neo-Nazi youth groups restricted its appeal to "mostly young people".

=== Voter base ===
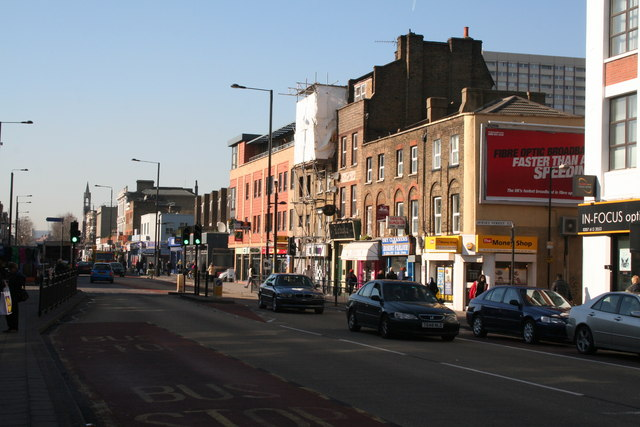
During its 1970s heyday, one of the strongest areas of National Front support was Bethnal Green (pictured), part of London's East End.

The NF's electoral support was overwhelmingly urban and English, with little support in rural parts of England or in Wales, Scotland and Northern Ireland. According to Walker, the 1974 election results suggested that the NF's electoral heartlands were in London's East End and inner north-east suburbs. He noted that it gained much support from "respectable working-class" areas, where many traditional Labour voters were attracted by its racial appeals.

Examining the party's East End support, the sociologist Christopher T. Husbands argued that NF support was not evenly distributed across the area, but constrained to Bethnal Green, Shoreditch, Hoxton and Haggerston. He noted that in these urban strongholds, "only a minority" of white residents sympathised with the NF. A 1978 survey in the East End by New Society found that while most white residents thought the immigration rate too high, many related positive relationships with Afro-Caribbean and Asian migrants and opposed the NF. Some mocked the Front, although were cautious about doing so publicly, fearing violent retaliation.

A 1977 survey by the University of Essex found that 8% of those polled were likely to vote for the Front, reflecting "strong support amongst the working class, the young and the poorly educated". This survey found that support was strongest in the East Midlands (10%), followed by London (8%), East Anglia (7%), the West Midlands (6%) and Yorkshire and Humberside (6%). A report published in 1980 instead found that Greater London and the West Midlands were the NF's greatest areas of support, together making up 48% of its national vote share. Determining that 71% of the NF's support came from men, this study also found a strong link to class, with 72% of NF supporters being working-class; it noted that support was "somewhat stronger among the skilled working class than among the semi- and unskilled workers." The 1980 study also examined views of the NF among the broader electorate, finding that 6% would "seriously consider" voting for the NF. Two-thirds of respondents believed that the NF stirred up racial tensions to advance its cause, 64% believed that there was a Nazi element to the party and 56% believed that the NF wanted Britain to become a dictatorship.

==== Explanations ====
Many members of a 'dominant' group, the 'white' English, felt 'threatened' by a new group, the 'coloured' English or coloured immigrants, who, it was thought, were variously destroying their cultural and national uniqueness, or competing unfairly for resources, particularly employment and housing... It was only when... some members of the 'dominant' group who perceived themselves to be under 'attack' felt that the Conservative Party had betrayed their interests, that the extreme right was able to emerge with widespread support.

— Political scientist Stan Taylor, 1982

Increasing levels of non-white immigration have been cited as an explanation for the NF's electoral growth in the 1970s. One argument was that areas with large non-white immigrant communities were most susceptible to NF support, and the higher the non-white population, the higher the resentment among local whites and the greater the support for the NF. An alternate explanation is that the NF did particularly well in areas where the non-white population was moderately sized; and whites turned to the NF because they feared that the local non-white population would grow, particularly if neighbouring areas already had large non-white populations.

On examining voting data from the 1977 Greater London Council election, the political scientist Paul Whiteley argued that the NF's vote share was best explained by the "working-class authoritarianism" phenomenon examined in the United States by S. M. Lipset. Christopher Husbands instead believed that the "territorial sensitivity" prevalent in English working-class culture was key. He argued that the English working-class largely created personal identities based on their neighbourhood rather than their profession, leaving them susceptible to far-right appeals based on location rather than leftist ones based on workplace solidarity. He argued that there were parallels with the Netherlands, where urban working-class communities had also expressed support for the far-right, although not in France, Germany, or Italy, where the urban proletariat had not offered substantial support for far-right parties.

== Electoral performance ==
The National Front experienced its greatest success between 1972 and 1977. By the late 1970s, the party's support had drastically declined and in the 1980s it largely withdrew from electoral participation. The Front's emergence as an electoral force during the 1970s was an "unprecedented development" in British politics, the first time a far-right party gained so many votes.

=== General and by-elections ===
The Front never gained a seat in the House of Commons. In the 1970 general election, the NF fielded ten candidates and averaged 3.6% of the vote share in those constituencies. It did better in subsequent by-elections; in the 1972 Uxbridge by-election it received 8.2% and in the 1973 West Bromwich by-election it received 16%, the first time that the party saved its electoral deposit. In the February 1974 election, 54 of its candidates averaged 3.3% of the vote, while in the October 1974 election, 90 candidates averaged 3.1%. In the October 1974 general election, the Front gained over twenty-five times as many votes as the BUF had gained at any election; this suggested that "politically speaking", fascism was "far stronger" in 1970s Britain than in 1930s Britain, the only European country where this was the case.

In 1977, the NF contested three by-elections, gaining 5.2% of the vote in the City of London and Westminster South by-election, 8.2% in the Birmingham Stechford by-election and 3.8% in the Ashfield by-election. In the Birmingham Stechford by-election, followed by another in Birmingham Ladywood in 1977 and in Lambeth Central in 1978, it beat the Liberals to reach third place. Within a few years the NF's electoral support had drastically declined; in the 1979 general election, it fielded 303 candidates and averaged 0.6% of the total national vote, losing £45,000 in deposits. In the seats contested, it averaged 1.3% of the vote, a number which rose to 2% in the 88 constituencies it contested in Greater London. This election "marked the beginning of the end of the movement's claim to seek political legitimacy through the ballot box". In the 1983 general election, the NF fought 54 seats, averaging 1% in each.

Electoral performance of the National Front
Year	Number of candidates	Total votes	Average voters per candidate	Percentage of vote	Saved deposits	Change (percentage points)	Number of MPs
1970	10	11,449	1,145	0.04	0	N/A	0
Feb 1974	54	76,865	1,423	0.2	0	+0.16	0
Oct 1974	90	113,843	1,265	0.4	0	+0.2	0
1979	303	191,719	633	0.6	0	+0.2	0
1983	60	27,065	451	0.1	0	−0.5	0
1987	1	286	286	0.0	0	−0.1	0
1992	14	4,816	344	0.1	0	+0.1	0
1997	6	2,716	452	0.0	0	−0.1	0
2001	5	2,484	497	0.0	0	0.0	0
2005	13	8,029	617	0.0	0	0.0	0
2010	17	10,784	634	0.0	0	0.0	0
2015	7	1,114	159	0.0	0	0.0	0

=== EU parliament elections ===
EU parliament elections stats of the National Front
Year	Candidates	MEPs	Percentage vote	Total votes	Change	Average vote
1989	1	0	0.0	1,471	N/A	1471
1994	5	0	0.1	12,469	+0.1	2494

=== Local elections ===
Although performing better in local elections than general ones, the NF never won a local council seat. In October 1969, two Conservative councillors on Wandsworth London Borough Council—Athlene O'Connell and Peter Mitchell—defected to the Front, but returned to the Conservatives in December. In the May 1974 London council elections, the party averaged 10% of the vote in the boroughs of Haringey, Islington, Brent, Southwark and Lewisham, while its best result was in Hounslow. In the April 1976 council elections, the NF boosted its vote in many towns, securing 21% of the vote in Sandwell, 20.7% in Wolverhampton, 18.54% in Leicester and 17% in Watford.

The NF made gains in the 1977 Greater London Council elections, where it contested all but one seat. Its 91 GLC candidates gained 120,000 votes, over twice the total that the party had accrued in the whole of England in 1974. In Inner London, it gained the third-largest vote share. Its share of the London vote also increased, reflecting an average rise from 4.4% in the October 1974 general election to 5.3% in the 1977 GLC election. It averaged over 10% of the vote in three boroughs: Hackney, Newham and Tower Hamlets. The NF's vote share began to stagnate in the local elections from 1977 and 1978. By 1977, the party's electoral support had peaked and, by the London Borough Council elections of 1978, its support "had very noticeably declined" in the city, something that was then reflected in local elections elsewhere in the UK.

In 2010, the NF gained its first elected representative in 35 years after John Gamble, a local councillor on Rotherham Metropolitan Borough Council, defected to it from the England First Party. In 2011 he was removed for failure to attend meetings in six months.

==== Parish and community councils ====
The NF obtained several representatives on parish councils and community councils. In 2010, Sam Clayton, a representative for Bilton and Ainsty with Bickerton Ward in Harrogate—originally elected uncontested as a BNP candidate in 2008—defected to the NF. By 2011 he was no longer on the council. In 2011 the NF gained a representative on Langley Parish Council in Derbyshire, when Timothy Knowles was elected without opposition. On failing to attend council meetings, he was ejected from the council several months later. In October 2015, the NF chairman David MacDonald was elected to Garthdee Community Council in Aberdeen with 18 votes.

== Reception ==
By the late 1960s, the National Front was "the principal electoral force" on the British far-right, and still dominated that scene at the start of the 1980s. By 1977, the NF was England's fourth largest political party in terms of electoral support, a level of success which—according to Thurlow—"testified to the significance" of the immigration issue in 1970s British politics. The NF had the "implicit support of around 15% of the electorate", with a further survey suggesting that 21% thought it would be 'good for Britain' if the NF gained seats in the House of Commons. Along with Tyndall's BNP, the NF was the most significant far-right group in Britain in the second half of the 20th century, according to Durham.

One variant of the National Front logo used by the party

The party also helped shape new far-right subcultures, for instance by cultivating the early white power skinhead music scene. Billig suggested that the NF's long-term importance might have been in keeping anti-Semitism alive in Britain at a time when, following the Holocaust, it was weakened. Billig also argued that the NF helped tilt British politics to the right, encouraging the Conservatives to take a harder stance on immigration under Thatcher's leadership.

During the NF's 1970s heyday, the mainstream media only occasionally paid it attention; the NF claimed that this was part of a conspiracy against the party. It often had a better relationship with local newspapers, which were more likely to publish letters sent in by the NF. In the 1970s, NF branches often sought good relations with police to ensure protection of NF events. While the party acknowledged sympathy for its views among the lower ranks of the police, it maintained that the police hierarchy was part of the conspiracy against it. During the 1970s, the party had cells among prison officers. By 2011, both the prison service and police had forbidden their employees from being NF members.

=== Opposition ===
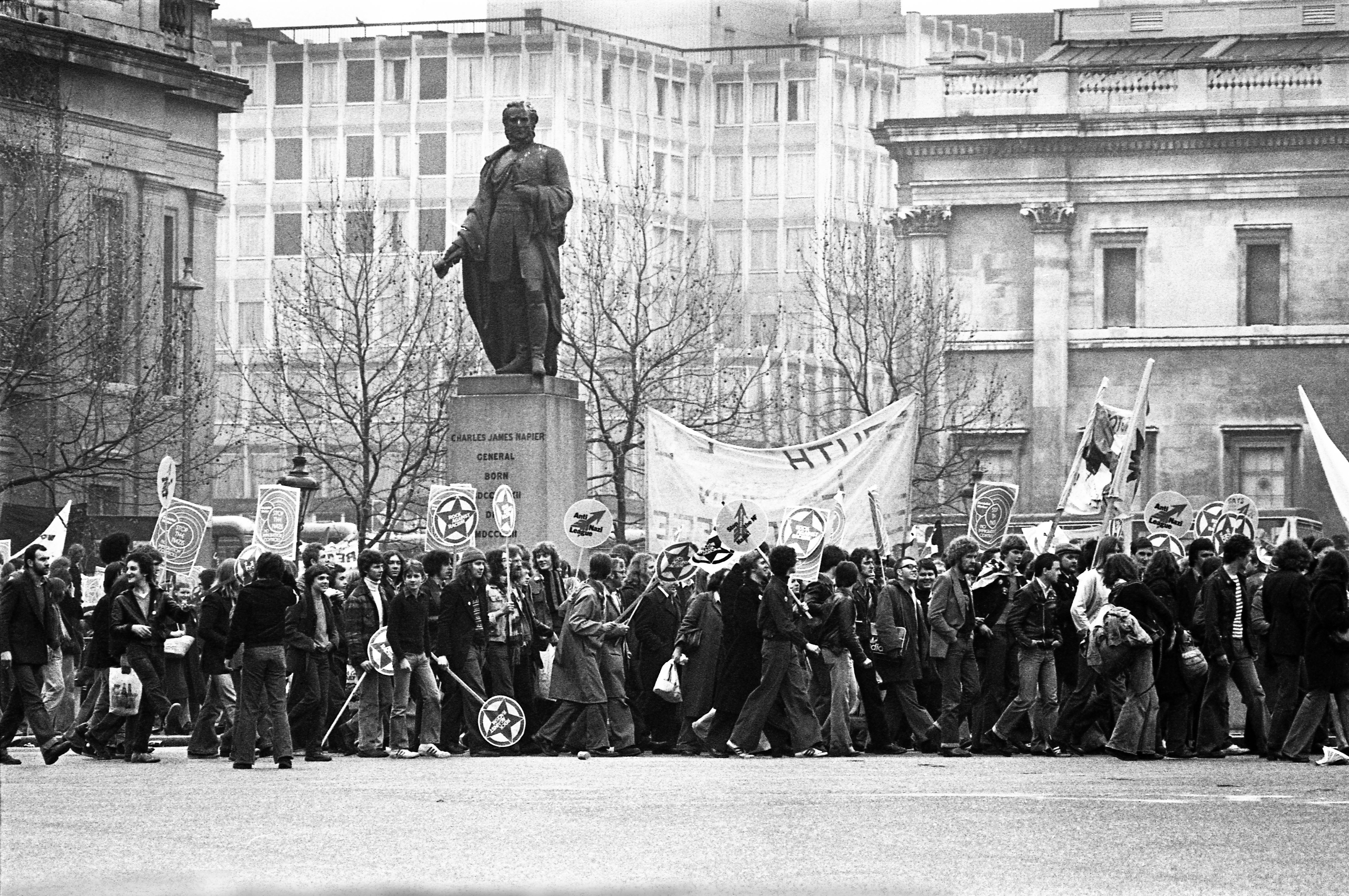
The Rock Against Racism movement was established in order to combat the National Front in the 1970s.

Major social and political groups largely ignored the NF's rise, hoping that depriving it of publicity would hasten its decline, although Jewish and leftist groups took a more proactive approach to opposing it. Leftist approaches varied: the Communist Party of Great Britain and Labour Party Young Socialists mobilised the labour movement against racism to diffuse the NF's appeal, while the International Marxist Group and the International Socialists/Socialist Workers Party favoured direct action to disrupt the NF, holding to the slogan: "No platform for fascists".

In 1974, the National Union of Students adopted a "no platform" policy regarding the NF, while the Labour Party forbade its candidates from sharing public platforms, radio, or television slots with NF candidates. 120 Labour-controlled councils banned the party from using local municipal halls. Labour and the Trades Union Congress (TUC) helped mobilise the trade union movement against the NF; the National Union of Mineworkers called for the government to ban the party. Far-left and left-wing activists demonstrated outside NF meetings, encouraging landlords to bar the NF from using their premises, and sometimes assaulted NF members.

Anti-fascist and anti-racist groups formed the National Co-Ordinating Committee in September 1977. That November, various left and far-left groups launched the Anti-Nazi League (ANL), which gained public endorsements from several Labour politicians, trade union leaders, academics, actors, musicians and athletes, some of whom later distanced themselves from it amid concerns that its sub-campaign, School Kids Against the Nazis, was politicising schoolchildren with leftist propaganda. A more moderate alternative, the Joint Committee Against Racialism (JCAR), was launched in December 1977, uniting Labour, Conservative and Liberal Party members. Rock Against Racism was formed in 1976, holding two well-attended music festivals in London in 1978. In January 1978, both Christians Against Racism and Fascism and the British Council of Churches' own anti-fascist organisation were formed. Taylor noted that by the end of 1977, an "unprecedented range of groups from almost every section of British society spreading right across the political spectrum had declared an intention to oppose the NF and the racism upon which it fed".
