= Sequoia =

Sequoia, Sequoya or Sequoyah refers to a type of tree in the cypress family which includes the redwood trees. By extension the name may refer to:

== Science and technology ==
=== Biology ===
- Sequoioideae, a three-genus subfamily of the cypress family
  - Sequoia (genus), a genus with one living and several fossil species
    - Sequoia sempervirens, coast redwood, found along the coast of California and Oregon
  - Sequoiadendron giganteum (giant sequoia), the sequoia tree found on the slopes of the Sierra Nevada of California
  - Metasequoia, dawn redwood
- The Great Sequoia, a sequoia tree in Vitoria-Gasteiz, Basque Country, Spain

=== Other science and technology ===
- macOS Sequoia, an Apple computer operating system version (2024)
- 1103 Sequoia, a minor planet
- Sequoia (supercomputer), an IBM supercomputer at Lawrence Livermore National Laboratory, US
- HFS Plus, an Apple file system codenamed Sequoia

== Arts and entertainment ==
- Old Sequoia, a 1945 American animated short film directed by Jack King
- Sequoia (1934 film), an American drama film
- Sequoia (2014 film), an American comedy film
- Sequoia (comics), a Marvel Comics character
- Sequoia (composition), by American composer Joan Tower
- "Sequoia", a song by Way Out West from Way Out West
- Sequoya (Ream), a bronze sculpture
- Sequoya (St. John's University's Literary Magazine)

== Places ==
=== United States ===
- State of Sequoyah, an attempt in the early 20th century by Native Americans to form their own state
- Canyon, California, formerly Sequoya
- Mount Sequoyah, Great Smoky Mountains
- Sequoia Hall, home of the Statistics Department of Stanford University
- Sequoia Hospital, Redwood City, California
- Sequoia National Park, a national park in the southern Sierra Nevada, California
  - Sequoia National Forest, adjacent to the Sequoia National Park
    - Giant Sequoia National Monument, monument administered as part of the National Forest
- Sequoia Park Zoo, in Eureka, California
- Sequoyah County, Oklahoma, a county in mid-eastern Oklahoma bordering Arkansas
- Sequoyah Nuclear Plant, Tennessee
- Sequoyah, Oklahoma, an unincorporated community in northeastern Oklahoma

=== Elsewhere ===
- Tour Sequoia, an office skyscraper in Paris, France

== Schools ==
- Sequoia Middle School (disambiguation), several schools
- Sequoia High School (disambiguation), several schools
- Sequoyah High School (Georgia), public school in Canton, Georgia
- Sequoyah High School (Claremore, Oklahoma), public school
- Sequoyah High School (Tahlequah, Oklahoma), high school and Native American boarding school
- Sequoyah School, a non-profit, independent alternative school in Pasadena, California
- Sequoia University, a defunct Los Angeles diploma mill

== Companies ==
- Sequoia Capital, a venture capital firm
- Sequoia Voting Systems, a California company that provides electronic voting systems
- Sequoia Fund, a Ruane, Cunniff & Goldfarb investment fund

== Transportation ==
- Piper Sequoya, a variant of the Piper Aerostar, a light twin-engine utility aircraft
- Sequoia Falco, a light, acrobatic aircraft
- Sequoia Field Airport, near Visalia, California, US
- Toyota Sequoia, a sport utility vehicle
- USS Sequoia, several US Navy ships
  - USS Sequoia (presidential yacht), U.S. presidential yacht
- USS Sequoyah (SP-426), a patrol boat in commission from 1917 to 1919

== People ==
- Sequoyah (1767–1843), American Indian silversmith and inventor of the Cherokee syllabary
- Johnny Sequoyah (born 2002), American actress
- Sequoia Holmes, American basketball player
- Sequoia Nagamatsu, American writer and professor
- Billy Ray Waldon, also known as Nvwtohiyada Idehesdi Sequoyah (born 1952), American former fugitive, American Indian Movement activist, and Esperantist

== Other uses ==
- Sequoyah (horse), Irish Thoroughbred racehorse
- Secoya (disambiguation)
