= Act now =

Act now or Act Now may refer to:

== Organizations ==
- ActNow Theatre, a social justice focused theatre company in South Australia
- Act Now (campaign group), a human rights group in support of Tamils
- Act Now BC, a health promotion strategy in British Columbia managed by Mary McNeil

== Other uses ==
- Act Now (exchange program), administered by the Strømme Foundation, Norway
- Act Now (slogan), in Hong Kong
- Act Now, a campaign by Young Friends of the Earth
- Act now, a campaign by Progressio Ireland

== See also ==
- Fish or cut bait, an English expression
- A.N.S.W.E.R. (Act Now to Stop War and End Racism), a US-based protest umbrella group
- ANHAD (Act Now for Harmony and Democracy), an Indian socio-cultural organization established in 2003
- Clear the Air (Hong Kong) "Act now – fight for better air", regarding air pollution in Hong Kong
- "We must act now", in Stern Review
- "Act now, explain later", a quotation of Jean Chrétien
- Act now, philosophy of Og Mandino
- "Act Now, Apologize Later", a quotation of Adam Werbach,
- "Let's act now, before it's too late", a quotation of Walter Williams
