= Graham Williamson =

British political activist

Graham Keith Williamson is a long-time political activist in the United Kingdom, having been active at the top levels of various far right groups including the National Front, the Third Way and Solidarity.

Williamson is an elected councillor representing the Independent Residents' Group in South Hornchurch ward of the London Borough of Havering, although he continues to be a member of the National Council of the National Liberal Party (see below). He is a member of the National Executive of the trade union Solidarity.

He is a leading member of the National Liberal Party which contested the 2014 European Parliament election with eight candidates in the London constituency election being held in May 2014.

== Political background ==
According to Williamson his first political involvement occurred in 1975 when, as a schoolboy, he made a speech to supporters of the "No Campaign" against the United Kingdom European Communities membership referendum.

Williamson eventually joined the National Front and rose to the position of deputy chairman. Active in the movement during the 1980s, he was closely associated with the Official National Front (ONF) wing of Nick Griffin, Derek Holland and Patrick Harrington which was opposed by the Flag Group of Andrew Brons and Ian Anderson. Like most of his fellow members of the tendency Williamson had begun as a member of the Young National Front. Williamson's membership of the NF dated back to 1975. Williamson attracted coverage when he and Harrington attended the 1988 Quds Day march.

== National Liberal Party ==
Williamson was a founder of the National Liberal Party in 1999. He has contributed to the Third Way, This was the name adopted to describe its guiding principles, as laid out by Williamson and TP Bragg in an independently produced 2005 booklet. As a result of taking up the manifesto, the Third Way supported an overarching British culture that could be embraced by immigrants, a system of federalism for the UK with the possibility of a future break-up, an isolationist foreign policy, environmentalism, the wide use of Swiss-style citizens' initiatives and distributism. The Declaration is divided into two, with its environmental, spiritual and philosophical manifesto written by Bragg.

Williamson was a candidate for the Third Way in the 2006 local elections in Havering London Borough Council, where Third Way ran 14 candidates. With 954 votes, Williamson was not elected in what was one of the main areas of activity for the group. Williamson had been running a community group, officially not connected to Third Way, in the area for some time. His leadership of the group in Elm Park and his past in the National Front were covered in an issue of Private Eye, with Williamson claiming in the magazine that his group had the support of the local MP John Cryer. Cryer subsequently disavowed the group and condemned Williamson in Searchlight. Williamson was also the London East and East Central organiser for the Campaign for an Independent Britain.

Among Fiore's ideas was that far right white nationalist groups should form alliances with national liberation movements and separatists. Williamson and Harrington pioneered this in the National Front in the 1980s, but apart from allowing them to claim they were not racists because they had black allies, the policy was not a success. The National Liberal Party has kept up this strategy, appealing for ethnic minority votes by focusing on national struggles abroad and with particular emphasis on injustices in Sri Lanka and India.

Despite the far right and fascist backgrounds of its leaders, the party has contested elections in London on a multicultural election list including Tamil, Sikh and Kurdish candidates. It says, "The National Liberal Party is putting forward a team of 8 ethnically and racially diverse candidates – Tamil, Sikh, Azerbaijan, Kurdish, English, north Borneo (sabah-sarawak), to represent the real grassroots London."

== Elections contested ==
European Parliament elections (Multi-member constituency; party list)

| Election | Region | Party | Votes | % of votes | Result | Source |
|---|---|---|---|---|---|---|
| 2014 European election | London | National Liberal | 6,736 | 0.3 | Not elected | |

London borough council elections

| Election | Ward | Party | Votes | % of votes | Result | Source |
|---|---|---|---|---|---|---|
| 1986 Havering London Borough Council election | Elm Park | National Front | 281 | | Not elected | |
| 1990 Havering London Borough Council election | Elm Park | Independent | 950 | | Not elected | |
| 1994 Havering London Borough Council election | Elm Park | Third Way | 782 | | Not elected | |
| 1998 Havering London Borough Council election | Elm Park | Third Way | 578 | | Not elected | |
| 2002 Havering London Borough Council election | Elm Park | Third Way | 1,309 | | Not elected | |
| 2006 Havering London Borough Council election | Elm Park | National Liberal | 954 | | Not elected | |
| 2010 Havering London Borough Council election | South Hornchurch | Ind. Residents | 1,453 | | Not elected | |
| 2014 Havering London Borough Council election | South Hornchurch | Ind. Residents | 1,336 | | Elected | |
| 2018 Havering London Borough Council election | South Hornchurch | Ind. Residents | 1,286 | | Elected | |
| 2022 Havering London Borough Council election | South Hornchurch | Ind. Residents | 1,019 | | Elected | |
| 2026 Havering London Borough Council election | South Hornchurch | Residents | 851 | | Not elected | |

== Charity ==
Williamson is also a director of the human rights campaign group Act Now. He is a former British humanitarian aid worker in Sri Lanka and founded Act Now with fellow aid workers after seeing human rights violations and mass killings directed against the Tamil population.

It was through his work with Act Now that Williamson developed a strong relationship with the Tamil community in Britain, to the extent that he has persuaded Tamils and other ethnic minority people to join and contest elections for the National Liberal Party.
