= Tim Martin =

Tim Martin may refer to:

== People ==
- Tim Martin (American football) (born 1976), indoor American football player
- Tim Martin (businessman) (born 1955), founder of British pub chain Wetherspoons
- Tim Martin (soccer) (born 1967), American association football defender
- Tim Martin (human rights), British aid worker in Sri Lanka

== Fictional characters ==
- Timmy Martin, in Lassie (1954 TV series)
