= Airfield (ward) =

Defunct electoral ward in the London Borough of Havering

- Former electoral ward for the Havering London Borough Council
- Airfield ward boundaries from 1978 to 2002
- Borough: Havering
- County: Greater London
- Population: 9,937 (1991)
- Electorate: 7,325 (1998)
- Major settlements: South Hornchurch

Former electoral ward
- Created: 1978
- Abolished: 2002
- Councillors: 3
- Created from: Elm Park, South Hornchurch and Rainham
- Replaced by: Elm Park, Hacton and South Hornchurch
- ONS code: 02BBFA

Airfield was an electoral ward in the London Borough of Havering from 1978 to 2002. The ward was first used in the 1978 elections and last used at the 1998 elections. It returned three councillors to Havering London Borough Council. The ward covered the eastern part of South Hornchurch, including much of the Airfield housing estate built on the site of RAF Hornchurch. The ward was only represented by Labour Party councillors.

== List of councillors ==
Term	Councillor	Party
1978–1982	Stephen Clarke	Labour
1978–1982	Thomas Mitchell	Labour
1978–1982	Sydney Jack	Labour
1982–2002	Raymond Emmett	Labour
1982–1990	Jack Hoepelman	Labour
1982–1990	Rosina Purnell	Labour
1994–1998	May Whitelock	Labour
1998–2002	Benjamin Norwin	Labour

== Havering council elections ==
=== 1998 election ===
The election on 7 May 1998 took place on the same day as the 1998 Greater London Authority referendum.

1998 Havering London Borough Council election: Airfield (3)
Party	Candidate	Votes	%	±%
Labour	Raymond Emmett	1,172		
Labour	Christopher Purnell	1,093		
Labour	Benjamin Norwin	991		
Residents	Dorothy Gray	636		
Conservative	John Carter	482		
Conservative	Charles Morris	454		
Conservative	Nicholas Hughes	424		
Third Way	Jeannie Trueman	273		
Turnout				
Labour hold		Swing		
Labour hold		Swing		
Labour hold		Swing		

=== 1994 election ===
The election took place on 5 May 1994.

1994 Havering London Borough Council election: Airfield (3)
Party	Candidate	Votes	%	±%
Labour	Raymond Emmett	2,051		
Labour	Christopher Purnell	1,960		
Labour	May Whitelock	1,925		
Conservative	Norman Forster	657		
Conservative	Charles Morris	655		
Conservative	Ian Woodward	616		
Liberal Democrats	Brian Philbrooks	400		
Liberal Democrats	Evelyn Weaver	379		
Liberal Democrats	Michael Weaver	351		
Third Way	Oliver Tillett	142		
Turnout				
Labour hold		Swing		
Labour hold		Swing		
Labour hold		Swing		

=== 1990 election ===
The election took place on 3 May 1990.

1990 Havering London Borough Council election: Airfield (3)
Party	Candidate	Votes	%	±%
Labour	Raymond Emmett	2,056		
Labour	Christopher Purnell	1,978		
Labour	May Whitelock	1,913		
Conservative	Patricia Dregent	1,088		
Conservative	Peter McComish	1,035		
Conservative	Dominic Swan	1,031		
Liberal Democrats	Maureen Little	385		
Liberal Democrats	Carol Gaspard	371		
Liberal Democrats	Bernadette Oddy	342		
Turnout				
Labour hold		Swing		
Labour hold		Swing		
Labour hold		Swing		

=== 1986 election ===
The election took place on 8 May 1986.

1986 Havering London Borough Council election: Airfield (3)
Party	Candidate	Votes	%	±%
Labour	Raymond Emmett	1,459		
Labour	Rosina Purnell	1,456		
Labour	Jack Hoepelman	1,454		
Conservative	Charles Morris	897		
Conservative	Margaret Munday	815		
Conservative	Pauline Orrin	800		
Alliance	Alan Hudson	702		
Alliance	Ralph Gordon	684		
Alliance	Harry Rivers	668		
Turnout				
Labour hold		Swing		
Labour hold		Swing		
Labour hold		Swing		

=== 1982 election ===
The election took place on 6 May 1982.

1982 Havering London Borough Council election: Airfield (3)
Party	Candidate	Votes	%	±%
Labour	Raymond Emmett	1,046		
Labour	Jack Hoepelman	1,036		
Labour	Rosina Purnell	993		
Conservative	Patrick Curtin	958		
Conservative	Martin Sinclair	940		
Conservative	Margaret Munday	922		
Alliance	Thomas Mitchell	792		
Alliance	Cynthia Matthews	771		
Alliance	Gordon Smith	693		
Turnout				
Labour hold		Swing		
Labour hold		Swing		
Labour hold		Swing		

=== 1978 election ===
The election took place on 4 May 1978.

1978 Havering London Borough Council election: Airfield (3)
Party	Candidate	Votes	%	±%
Labour	Stephen Clarke	1,479		
Labour	Thomas Mitchell	1,461		
Labour	Sydney Jack	1,396		
Conservative	Edward Hoad	990		
Conservative	Martin Shipp	962		
Conservative	Margaret Munday	947		
Ind. Residents	Andrew Carew	524		
Ind. Residents	Brenda Hammond	440		
Ind. Residents	Joan Lewis	403		
Turnout				
Labour win (new seat)				
Labour win (new seat)				
Labour win (new seat)				
