= Sequoyah High School =

Sequoyah High School is the name of a high school found in several different locations in the United States:

- Sequoyah High School (Georgia)
- Sequoyah High School (Cherokee County, Oklahoma), a high school and Native American boarding school near Tahlequah, Oklahoma
- Sequoyah High School (Claremore, Oklahoma)
- Sequoyah High School (Tennessee)

== See also ==
- Sequoia High School (disambiguation)
