= Secoya (disambiguation) =

The Secoya are an Indigenous peoples from the Ecuadorian and Peruvian Amazon.

Secoya may also refer to:

- Secoya language, Tucanon language spoken in Ecuador and Peru
- Litoporus secoya, a species of spider
- Secoya Hall, a residence building at California State Polytechnic University, Pomona

== See also ==
- Sequoia (disambiguation)
