= Emily Roebling Cadwalader =

American socialite and philanthropist (died 1941)

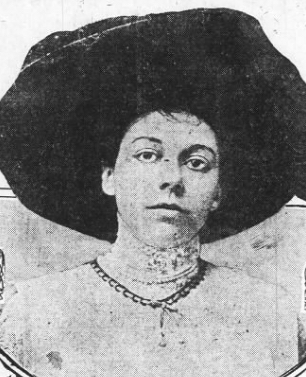
- Emily Roebling Cadwalader, from a 1909 publication
- Born: Emily Margaretta Roebling; September 9, 1881
- Died: May 15, 1941 (aged 59); Fort Washington, Pennsylvania
- Occupation: socialite
- Known for: owned two historic yachts, the USS Sequoia and the MV Savarona
- Spouse(s): Richard M. Cadwalader, Jr. (m. 1909)

Emily Margaretta Roebling Cadwalader (born: September 9, 1881, died: May 15, 1941) was an American socialite and philanthropist, based in Philadelphia. She is best known as the owner of two historic yachts, the USS Sequoia and the MV Savarona.

== Early life ==
Emily Roebling was the daughter of Charles Gustavus Roebling and Sarah (or Sallie) Ormsby Mahon Roebling. Her father was an engineer, president of John A. Roebling's Sons, a steel wire and cable company. Her Prussian-born grandfather, John Augustus Roebling, was best known as the civil engineer behind the Brooklyn Bridge.

Roebling was raised in Trenton, New Jersey. In 1905 she rescued her father's stable of horses during a fire, and assisted firefighters in their work. In 1908 she unveiled the bronze statue of her grandfather in Trenton. She was an avid tennis player and horsewoman, and was considered one of the first women in Trenton to drive her own automobile.

== Wealth and philanthropy ==
=== Blind education ===
Roebling took an interest in blind education in New Jersey, and was appointed to a commission to study the needs of blind residents of the state before she married and moved to Philadelphia. As part of that work, she organized an exhibit of work by blind crafters of New Jersey, including handmade lace, crochet, and knit items, at Atlantic City in 1909. She was also editor-in-chief of the newspaper for the 1908 Charity Fair in Trenton.

=== Fairwold ===
After marriage, Cadwalader lived part-time in Fort Washington, Pennsylvania, in a house known as Fairwold. They expanded the house significantly, adding a ballroom, a pipe organ, and a solarium among other features. Fairwold was used as a convalescent hospital during World War I, while the Cadwaladers lived in their Philadelphia townhouse. Since 1995, Fairwold has been a synagogue of the congregation Or Hadash.

=== Yachts ===
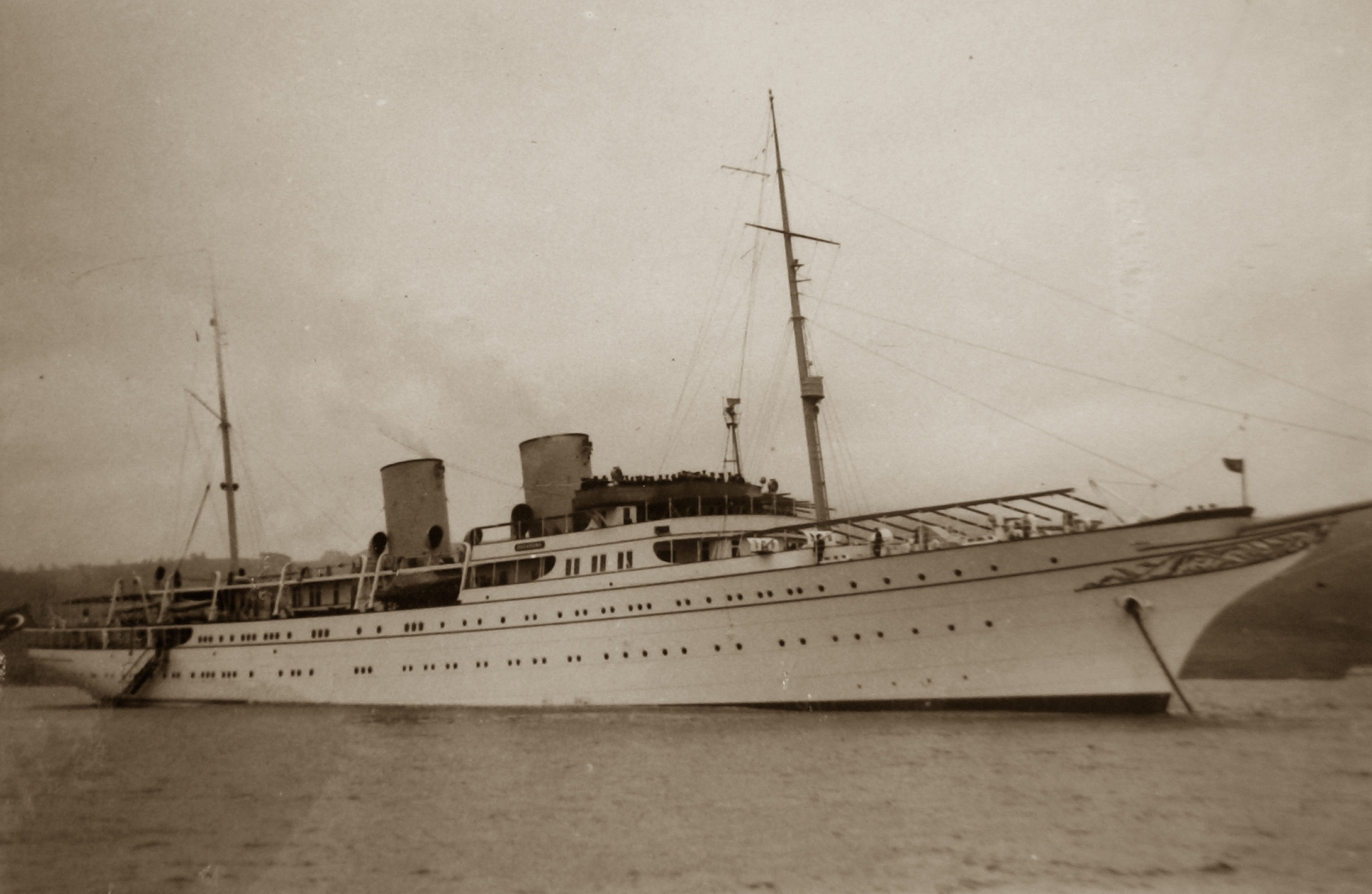
The yacht MV Savarona in 1953

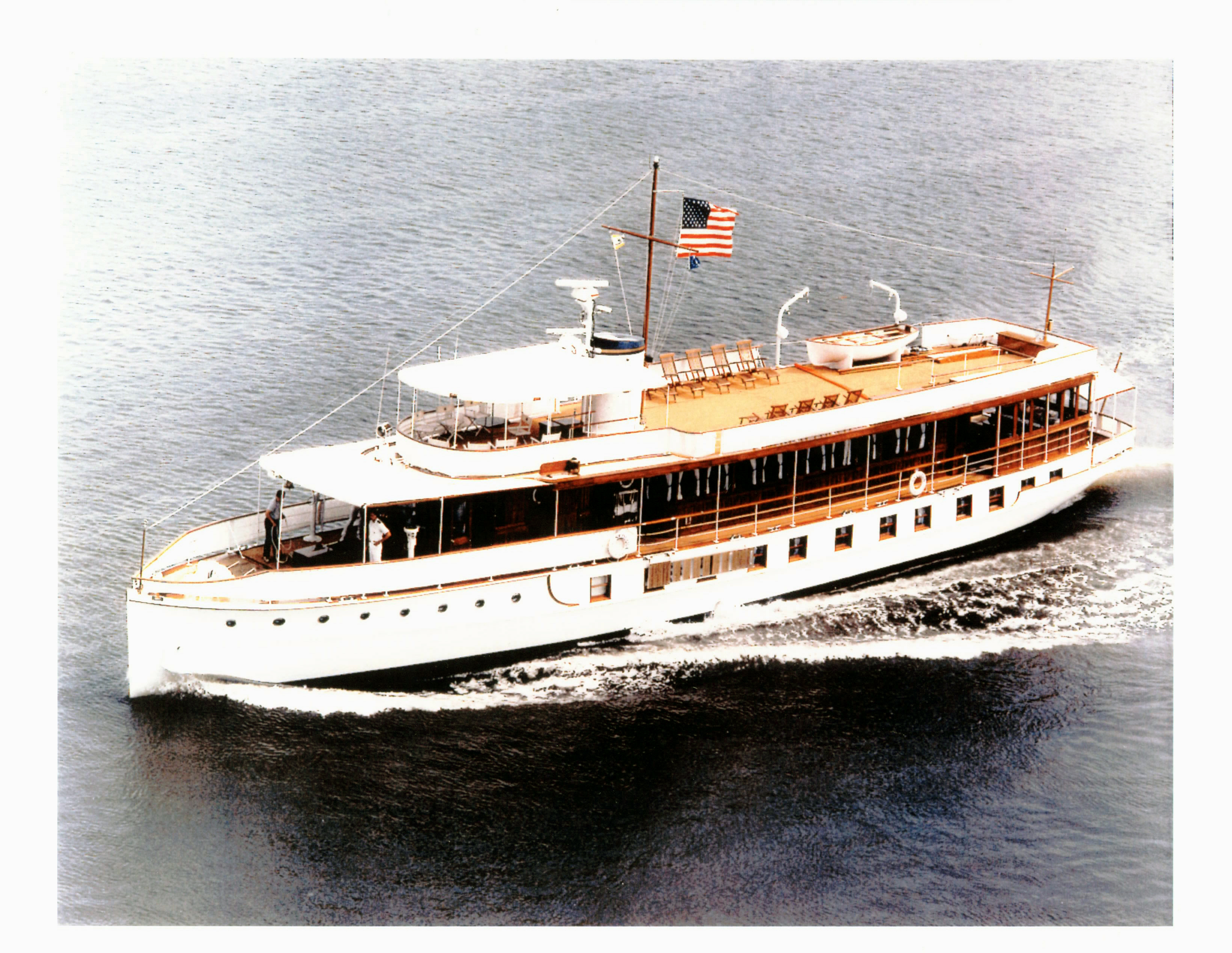
The USS yacht Sequoia in 2003

Cadwalader maintained a longstanding interest in yachts. In 1924, she purchased her first yacht, the 85-foot Sequoia. The following year she acquired the Sequoia II. The USS Sequoia became property of the United States government in 1931, and was used by presidents from Herbert Hoover to Gerald Ford. President Jimmy Carter ordered the Sequoia to be sold in 1977. As of autumn 2019, it was being restored in Belfast.

Cadwalader was the original owner of three German-made yachts named Savarona, purchased in 1926, 1928, and 1930. The last Savarona, at the time, was the "largest, most luxurious, most expensive private yacht ever created". In 1937 the yacht was a factor in charges of tax fraud against the Cadwaladers. The Cadwaladers sold the 440-foot yacht to Turkish president Kemal Atatürk in 1938. The yacht remains in Istanbul and was restored in the 1990s; it is still considered "one of the world's largest yachts". After a scandal in 2010, the Turkish Cultural Ministry purchased the Savarona, and it is now used by the Turkish president for hosting state events.

== Personal life ==
Emily Roebling married banker Richard M. Cadwalader Jr., the grandson of Thomas McCall Cadwalader, in 1909. She died at her home in Fort Washington in 1941.
