= South Hornchurch (ward) =

Electoral ward in the London borough of Havering

- Electoral ward for the Havering London Borough Council
- South Hornchurch ward boundaries since 2022
- Borough: Havering
- County: Greater London
- Population: 10,884 (2021) (Note: 2021 Census data reported for 2022 ward boundaries)
- Electorate: 7,402 (2022)
- Major settlements: South Hornchurch
- Area: 2.503 square kilometres (0.966 sq mi)

Current electoral ward
- Created: 1965
- Number of members: 1965–2022: 3; 2022–present: 2
- Councillors: Luke Barry; Angelica Ola
- GSS code: E05000321 (2002–2022); E05013984 (2022–present)

South Hornchurch is an electoral ward in the London Borough of Havering. The ward has existed since the creation of the borough on 1 April 1965 and was first used in the 1964 elections. It returns councillors to Havering London Borough Council. There was a revision of ward boundaries in 1978, 2002 and 2022. The revision in 2022 reduced the number of councillors from three to two.

The 1965, 1978 and 2002 versions of the ward covered a large area of southern Hornchurch extending northwards from the River Thames, including the industrialised Hornchurch Marshes area. Since 2022 the ward has corresponded with the South Hornchurch neighbourhood.

== List of councillors ==
Term	Councillor	Party
1964–1968	C. Seager	Labour
1964–1968	A. Booton	Labour
1964–1968	E. Hillman	Labour
1968–1971	J. Collins	Conservative
1968–1971	J. Smith	Conservative
1968–1971	C. Sherman	Conservative
1971–1974	H. Bygate	Labour
1971–1978	H. Rivers	Labour
1971–1978	J. Whysall	Labour
1974–1978	S. Clarke	Labour
1978–2008	Leonard Long	Residents
1978–1982	Michael Burke	Residents
1978–1982	Ronald Whittaker	Residents
1982–1986	Ann Cockerton	Conservative
1982–1986	James Allum	Conservative
1986–1998	Roger Newnham	Residents
1986–2002	Reginald Whitney	Residents
1998–2002; 2006–2010	Thomas Binding	Labour
2002–2006	Malvin Brown	Residents
2006–2010	John Clark	Conservative
2008–2022	Michael-Deon Burton (Note: Michael-Deon Burton changed parties in 2008 and 2018)	Independent
2008–2022	Michael-Deon Burton	Ind. Residents
2008–2022	Michael-Deon Burton	Conservative
2010–2014	Rebbecca Bennett	Conservative
2010–2014	Denis Breading	Labour
2014–2018	Philip Martin	UKIP
2014–2026	Graham Williamson	Ind. Residents
2018–2026	Natasha Summers	Ind. Residents
2026–present	Luke Barry	Reform
2026–present	Angelica Ola	Reform

== Summary ==
Councillors elected by party at each general borough election.

- Labour
- Conservative
- Res/Ind
- UKIP
- Reform

== Havering council elections since 2022 ==
There was a revision of ward boundaries in Havering in 2022. South Hornchurch lost territory in the south to Rainham and Wennington and the new ward of Beam Park. The number of councillors representing the ward was reduced from three to two.

=== 2026 election ===
The election took place on 7 May 2026.

2026 Havering London Borough Council election: South Hornchurch (2)
Party	Candidate	Votes	%	±%
Reform	Luke Barry	1,307	41.3	N/A
Reform	Angelica Ola	1,151	36.3	N/A
Residents	Graham Williamson	851	26.9	−17.9
Residents	Natasha Summers	806	25.4	−19.3
Labour	Karen Bernard	433	13.7	−15.6
Green	Ruth Kettle-Frisby	316	9.8	+4.7
Labour	Eric Sheqi	310	9.8	−19.3
Independent	Mushtaq Ahmad	261	8.2	N/A
Green	Henry Mcaneny	243	7.7	N/A
Conservative	Michael-Deon Burton	230	7.3	−17.8
Conservative	Arunraj Swlvaraj	161	5.1	−16.8
Liberal Democrats	Caroline Hibbs-Brown	66	2.1	N/A
Turnout			42.62	
Reform gain from Residents		Swing		
Reform gain from Residents		Swing		

=== 2022 election ===
The election took place on 5 May 2022.

2022 Havering London Borough Council election: South Hornchurch (2)
Party	Candidate	Votes	%	±%
Ind. Residents	Natasha Summers	1,023	44.8	
Ind. Residents	Graham Williamson	1,019	44.7	
Labour	Julia Pearman	669	29.3	
Labour	Mirza Akhtar	664	29.1	
Conservative	Michael-Deon Burton	573	25.1	
Conservative	Maggie Themistocli	500	21.9	
Green	Kim Arrowsmith	116	5.1	
Turnout			31.8%	
Majority		350	15.4	
Ind. Residents win (new boundaries)				
Ind. Residents win (new boundaries)				

== 2002–2022 Havering council elections ==
South Hornchurch ward boundaries from 2002 to 2022

There was a revision of ward boundaries in Havering in 2002. Territory was gained in the northeast from the abolished Airfield ward and some territory was transferred to Elm Park ward in the northwest.

=== 2018 election ===
The election took place on 3 May 2018. Michael-Deon Burton stood as an independent candidate at the election and joined the Conservative Party immediately after the election.

2018 Havering London Borough Council election: South Hornchurch (3)
Party	Candidate	Votes	%	±%
Ind. Residents	Natasha Summers	1,362	39.5	
Independent	Michael-Deon Burton	1,312	38.1	
Ind. Residents	Graham Williamson	1,286	37.3	
Labour	Patricia Brown	1,043	30.3	
Labour	Trevor McKeever	1,019	29.6	
Labour	Nicholas West	939	27.3	
Ind. Residents	Phillip Bowen	811	23.5	
Conservative	George Brind	634	18.4	
Conservative	Grant Rose	561	16.3	
Conservative	Tammy Farquhar	422	12.2	
UKIP	Jane Fellowes	315	9.1	
Green	Mohammad Ali	165	4.8	
Turnout			32.43%	
Majority				
Ind. Residents hold		Swing		
Independent gain from UKIP		Swing		
Ind. Residents hold		Swing		

=== 2014 election ===
The election took place on 22 May 2014.

2014 Havering London Borough Council election: South Hornchurch (3)
Party	Candidate	Votes	%	±%
Ind. Residents	Michael-Deon Burton	1,738		
UKIP	Philip Martin	1,500		
Ind. Residents	Graham Williamson	1,336		
Residents	Mark Logan	1,264		
Labour	Patricia Brown	870		
Labour	Pervez Badruddin	867		
Labour	Christopher Freeman	710		
Conservative	Patricia Clark	567		
Conservative	Warren Camilleri	468		
Conservative	Tammey Oddy	296		
Green	Kuan Phillips	275		
Turnout				
Ind. Residents hold		Swing		
UKIP gain from Conservative		Swing		
Ind. Residents gain from Labour		Swing		

=== 2010 election ===
The election on 6 May 2010 took place on the same day as the United Kingdom general election.

2010 Havering London Borough Council election: South Hornchurch (3)
Party	Candidate	Votes	%	±%
Conservative	Rebbecca Bennett	1,947		
Ind. Residents	Michael-Deon Burton	1,942		
Labour	Denis Breading	1,746		
Conservative	Daniel Hatch	1,659		
Ind. Residents	Keith Roberts	1,651		
Labour	Stephen Jaques	1,596		
Labour	Bryan Vincent	1,540		
Conservative	Vidyotama Persaud	1,483		
Ind. Residents	Graham Williamson	1,453		
UKIP	James Fellowes	892		
Independent	Wendy Buck	449		
Turnout				
Conservative hold		Swing		
Residents gain from Independent		Swing		
Labour hold		Swing		

=== 2008 by-election ===
The by-election took place on 3 July 2008, following the death of Leonard Long.

2008 South Hornchurch by-election
Party	Candidate	Votes	%	±%
Independent	Michael-Deon Burton	661	27.0	+7.9
BNP	Anthony Steff	518	21.2	+21.2
Conservative	Christopher Ryan	438	17.9	−4.7
Labour	Graham Carr	416	17.0	−5.9
Independent	Reg Whitney	287	11.7	−12.8
UKIP	Craig Litwin	64	2.6	+2.6
English Democrat	Peter Thorogood	28	1.1	+1.1
Residents	Malvin Brown	17	0.7	−4.5
Independent	Mark Whitehead	17	0.7	+0.7
Majority		143	5.8	
Turnout		2,446	23.8	
Independent gain from Residents		Swing		

=== 2006 election ===
The election took place on 4 May 2006.

2006 Havering London Borough Council election: South Hornchurch (3)
Party	Candidate	Votes	%	±%
Residents	Leonard Long	878	24.5	
Labour	Thomas Binding	821	22.9	
Conservative	John Clark	812	22.6	
Residents	Reginald Whitney	788		
Residents	Wendy Clark	757		
Conservative	Patricia Clark	742		
Labour	David Leigh	741		
Labour	Rosina Purnell	733		
Independent	Wendy Buck	687	19.1	
Independent	Michael-Deon Burton	656		
Independent	June Walker	623		
Conservative	Ronald Gadd	620		
Green	Susan Gower	204	5.7	
Green	Guy Gower	191		
Residents	Malvin Brown	186	5.2	
Turnout			34.0	
Residents hold		Swing		
Labour gain from Residents		Swing		
Conservative gain from Residents		Swing		

=== 2002 election ===
The election took place on 2 May 2002. As an experiment, it was a postal voting election, with the option to hand the papers in on election day.

2002 Havering London Borough Council election: South Hornchurch (3)
Party	Candidate	Votes	%	±%
Residents	Leonard Long	1,804		
Residents	Reginald Whitney	1,776		
Residents	Malvin Brown	1,539		
Labour	Christopher Purnell	1,368		
Labour	Jean Mitchell	1,149		
Labour	Michael Wood	1,139		
Conservative	John Carter	889		
Conservative	John Clark	869		
Conservative	Patricia Clark	847		
Turnout				
Residents win (new boundaries)				
Residents win (new boundaries)				
Residents win (new boundaries)				

== 1978–2002 Havering council elections ==
South Hornchurch ward boundaries from 1978 to 2002

There was a revision of ward boundaries in Havering in 1978. Some territory in the northeast was transferred to the new Airfield ward.

=== 1998 election ===
The election on 7 May 1998 took place on the same day as the 1998 Greater London Authority referendum.

1998 Havering London Borough Council election: South Hornchurch (3)
Party	Candidate	Votes	%	±%
Residents	Leonard Long	1,134		
Residents	Reginald Whitney	1,012		
Labour	Thomas Binding	964		
Residents	Wendy Clark	951		
Labour	Leslie Reid	927		
Labour	David Burn	892		
Conservative	Dennis Bull	391		
Conservative	Guy Gower	331		
Conservative	Iris Cotier	317		
Turnout				
Residents hold		Swing		
Residents hold		Swing		
Labour gain from Residents		Swing		

=== 1994 election ===
The election took place on 5 May 1994.

1994 Havering London Borough Council election: South Hornchurch (3)
Party	Candidate	Votes	%	±%
Residents	Leonard Long	2,029		
Residents	Roger Newnham	1,855		
Residents	Reginald Whitney	1,794		
Labour	Alan Fenn	1,245		
Labour	Sylvia Harrison	1,229		
Labour	Barbara Nunn	1,209		
Conservative	Patricia Field	350		
Conservative	Daniel Regan	327		
Conservative	Joyce Weaver	304		
Turnout				
Residents hold		Swing		
Residents hold		Swing		
Residents hold		Swing		

=== 1990 election ===
The election took place on 3 May 1990.

1990 Havering London Borough Council election: South Hornchurch (3)
Party	Candidate	Votes	%	±%
Residents	Leonard Long	2,227		
Residents	Roger Newnham	2,016		
Residents	Reginald Whitney	1,939		
Labour	Alan Fenn	1,332		
Labour	Sylvia Harrison	1,293		
Labour	Linda Pearce	1,257		
Conservative	Leslie Adler	662		
Turnout				
Residents hold		Swing		
Residents hold		Swing		
Residents hold		Swing		

=== 1986 election ===
The election took place on 8 May 1986.

1986 Havering London Borough Council election: South Hornchurch (3)
Party	Candidate	Votes	%	±%
Residents	Leonard Long	1,732		
Residents	Roger Newnham	1,555		
Residents	Reginald Whitney	1,486		
Labour	Henry Webb	1,084		
Labour	Anthony Hunt	1,083		
Labour	Michael Wood	997		
Conservative	John Clark	766		
Conservative	Robert Willoughby	760		
Conservative	Michael White	736		
Alliance	Michael Burke	338		
Alliance	Wendie Norris	296		
Alliance	David Bruck	286		
Turnout				
Residents hold		Swing		
Residents gain from Conservative		Swing		
Residents gain from Conservative		Swing		

=== 1982 election ===
The election took place on 6 May 1982.

1982 Havering London Borough Council election: South Hornchurch (3)
Party	Candidate	Votes	%	±%
Residents	Leonard Long	1,029		
Conservative	Ann Cockerton	981		
Conservative	James Allum	979		
Residents	Peter Thwaites	912		
Residents	Ronald Whittaker	908		
Labour	Lucy Bolstridge	891		
Labour	Richard Desmond	890		
Conservative	Pauline Orrin	874		
Labour	Keith Darvill	869		
Alliance	Harry Rivers	594		
Alliance	William Tyrell	590		
Alliance	Ivor Cameron	567		
Turnout				
Residents hold		Swing		
Conservative gain from Residents		Swing		
Conservative gain from Residents		Swing		

=== 1978 election ===
The election took place on 4 May 1978.

1978 Havering London Borough Council election: South Hornchurch (3)
Party	Candidate	Votes	%	±%
Residents	Leonard Long	1,384		
Residents	Michael Burke	1,317		
Residents	Ronald Whittaker	1,299		
Labour	Harry Rivers	1,249		
Labour	Richard Desmond	1,201		
Labour	Lynne Cunningham	1,179		
Conservative	Ralph Pollard	889		
Conservative	Robin Hackshall	870		
Conservative	Mary Oxley	859		
Turnout				
Residents win (new boundaries)				
Residents win (new boundaries)				
Residents win (new boundaries)				

== 1964–1978 Havering council elections ==
External image
- Map showing South Hornchurch ward boundaries from 1965 to 1978

The ward established in 1965 covered the area from the southern boundary of the Elm Park estate the River Thames including the Hornchurch Marshes and most of South Hornchurch, with some eastern sections in Rainham ward.

=== 1974 election ===
The election took place on 2 May 1974.

1974 Havering London Borough Council election: South Hornchurch (3)
Party	Candidate	Votes	%	±%
Labour	H. Rivers	1,769		
Labour	J. Whysall	1,684		
Labour	S. Clarke	1,677		
Ind. Ratepayers	Leonard Long	946		
Ind. Ratepayers	L. Lowe	929		
Ind. Ratepayers	J. Oliver	915		
Conservative	D. Dryborough	767		
Conservative	D. White	767		
Conservative	B. Chamberlain	728		
Turnout				
Turnout				
Labour hold		Swing		
Labour hold		Swing		
Labour hold		Swing		

=== 1971 election ===
The election took place on 13 May 1971.

1971 Havering London Borough Council election: South Hornchurch (3)
Party	Candidate	Votes	%	±%
Labour	H. Bygate	2,897		
Labour	H. Rivers	2,862		
Labour	J. Whysall	2,753		
Conservative	B. Boakes	931		
Conservative	J. Smith	929		
Conservative	J. Collins	922		
Ind. Ratepayers	G. Reynolds	344		
Ind. Ratepayers	A. Robertson	320		
Turnout				
Labour gain from Conservative		Swing		
Labour gain from Conservative		Swing		
Labour gain from Conservative		Swing		

=== 1968 election ===
The election took place on 9 May 1968.

1968 Havering London Borough Council election: South Hornchurch (3)
Party	Candidate	Votes	%	±%
Conservative	J. Collins	1,095		
Conservative	J. Smith	1,092		
Conservative	C. Sherman	1,090		
Labour	P. Ridley	993		
Labour	May Rudlin	964		
Ind. Residents	G. Reynolds	912		
Labour	A. Lesslie	895		
Ind. Residents	F. Banning	738		
Ind. Residents	R. Vickers	735		
Independent	L. Lowe	323		
Independent	L. Long	295		
Liberal	L. Blows	207		
Liberal	F. Tyson	182		
Liberal	J. South	175		
Turnout				
Conservative gain from Labour		Swing		
Conservative gain from Labour		Swing		
Conservative gain from Labour		Swing		

=== 1964 election ===
The election took place on 7 May 1964.

1964 Havering London Borough Council election: South Hornchurch (3)
Party	Candidate	Votes	%	±%
Labour	C. Seager	1,959		
Labour	A. Booton	1,932		
Labour	E. Hillman	1,925		
Independent	H. Webb	1,357		
Independent	R. Manning	1,340		
Independent	F. Parr	1,334		
Turnout		3,371	39.9	
Labour win (new seat)				
Labour win (new seat)				
Labour win (new seat)				
