= Litoporus uncatus =

Scientific classification
- Kingdom: Animalia
- Phylum: Arthropoda
- Subphylum: Chelicerata
- Class: Arachnida
- Order: Araneae
- Infraorder: Araneomorphae
- Family: Pholcidae
- Genus: Litoporus
- Species: L. uncatus

Binomial name
- Litoporus uncatus Simon, 1893

Species of spider

Litoporus uncatus is a cellar spider species found in Colombia, Venezuela, Guyana, Ecuador, Peru, and Brazil.

== See also ==
- List of Pholcidae species
