= Kahraman Sadıkoğlu =

Turkish businessman

Kahraman Sadıkoğlu is a Turkish businessman. He owns the Istanbul-based Sadikoglu Group.

He paid for the restoration of one of the largest yachts in the world, the Savarona. She was purchased by the Turkish government in 1938 for use as a presidential yacht by Mustafa Kemal Atatürk, but was later allowed to fall into disrepair after his death. Sadikoglu leased the vessel in 1989 from the Turkish government and invested 50 million dollars to restore its former beauty. Afterwards he rented her out for luxury cruises. The lease contract was rescinded after a media scandal in 2010 and the Turkish government took the ship back.

In December 2005, Sadıkoğlu was kidnapped in the Iraqi port city of Umm Qasr by terrorists, who demanded a US$25 million ransom. He was released in February 2006 following the payment of a much smaller sum, said by his wife to be "less than $1m" and by the Turkish newspaper Vatan to be $500,000.

== Personal life ==
Sadıkoğlu has a son, Kemal.
