= Fish or cut bait =

English colloquial expression

Fish or cut bait is a colloquial expression, dating back to the 19th-century United States, that refers to division of complementary tasks. It has multiple uses that have evolved over time, but all generally convey that an important decision must be made, often immediately, and failing to make a choice is to make oneself a useless obstruction. It particularly cautions against procrastination and/or indecisiveness.

== Origins ==
The exact origin is unknown. The expression may have first appeared in texts in the mid-19th century United States, and derives from the act of fishing. One of the earliest instances where the expression received public attention was during a widely reported 1853 court case involving land ownership.

== Use and interpretation ==
The expression explores the merits of two options: "Fish", which refers to the act of fishing; or "cut bait", which refers to cutting up pieces of bait into small, usable portions. The meaning of the expression can vary, depending on which interpretation of "cut bait" is intended.

The original version of the expression derives from the fishing industry, in which fishermen must literally decide between two main tasks: to conduct the actual fishing with a line, or to cut the bait used for fishing. Both the task of fishing, and that of cutting the bait, are necessary to the goal of catching fish.

Failure to contribute is not one of the offered alternatives, although "go ashore" and "go overboard" are sometimes offered as clarifying alternatives.

Writer Jan Freeman in the Boston Globe summarizes with the characterization that, "It's sort of a maritime version of 'Lead, follow, or get out of the way'".

She followed up the following day with an expansion of her analysis of this phrase, including quotes from Literary Digest from 1899: "The thousands of Cuban soldiers yet in idleness will have to go to work when they find that it is imperative that they either cut bait or fish" and from School and Home, 1895, "The Eskimo is industrious, because nature compels him to 'fish, cut bait, or get out of the boat.'"

These usages exemplify the "do something useful" interpretation of the phrase.

Another, more common interpretation is that the expression means one has to make a decision and take action. The fisherman has only two tasks at hand, to fish or to cut bait. Therefore a decision has to be made to do one or to do the other - inaction is not acceptable.

Depending on the context, the expression can be intended as a form of advice or constructive criticism. It can also be interpreted as a threat, an invitation to act on a threat, or an accusation.

One of the earliest notable examples of the expression that gained public attention was a court case in 1853 involving land disputes, in which US Attorney General Caleb Cushing was displeased with Judge Levie Hubbell's conduct in the case. Cushing threatened to have the Judge impeached. Hubbell's response to the threat was, "...Cushing has commenced a suit in the United States Court...[he] must either fish or cut bait."

Hubbell's use of the expression implied that Cushing should either act on his threat of impeachment (fish), or, if unwilling, withdraw the threat and proceed with the case (cut bait). In this example, the expression is similar in intent to another common colloquialism: put up or shut up.

The expression occurs twice in the 1990 comedy film Three Men and a Little Lady, referring to the point in a romantic relationship when the couple must consider marriage, or splitting up. Part of the humor is that the expression is never explained, and the fishing imagery is totally incongruent with the idea of marriage.

=== "Cut bait" alone ===
The more modern variation on the meaning of the expression ("giving up" on something, or "stepping down") is due largely to the changing interpretation of "cut bait". Originally, "cut bait" referred to cutting up bait fish into small portions suitable for a hook or net. In more modern times, bait is often prepackaged, and cutting bait is uncommon outside of the commercial fishing industry. Therefore, the meaning of "cut bait" is sometimes taken to mean cutting one's fishing line, and giving up on the fishing.

As a result, the meaning of the expression has changed over time to imply "act now or stand down". This variation is now so common that it widely appears as the first entry in dictionaries and other reference materials.

It can also used to illustrate two necessary and related tasks that cannot be done at the same time. Literally, a lone fisherman has to do both, but can only do one at a time. The act of fishing exhausts the stockpile of bait that has been prepared. In other words, the balance between work and maintenance.

== See also ==
- Analysis paralysis
- Hook, Line and Sinker (disambiguation) (fellow fishing-themed idiom).
