= Litoporus dimona =

Scientific classification
- Kingdom: Animalia
- Phylum: Arthropoda
- Subphylum: Chelicerata
- Class: Arachnida
- Order: Araneae
- Infraorder: Araneomorphae
- Family: Pholcidae
- Genus: Litoporus
- Species: L. dimona

Binomial name
- Litoporus dimona Huber, 2000

Species of spider

Litoporus dimona is a cellar spider species found in Brazil.

== See also ==
- List of Pholcidae species
