= Litoporus iguassuensis =

Scientific classification
- Domain: Eukaryota
- Kingdom: Animalia
- Phylum: Arthropoda
- Subphylum: Chelicerata
- Class: Arachnida
- Order: Araneae
- Infraorder: Araneomorphae
- Family: Pholcidae
- Genus: Litoporus
- Species: L. iguassuensis

Binomial name
- Litoporus iguassuensis Mello-Leitao, 1918

Species of spider

Litoporus iguassuensis is a cellar spider species found in Brazil.
