= Litoporus saul =

Scientific classification
- Domain: Eukaryota
- Kingdom: Animalia
- Phylum: Arthropoda
- Subphylum: Chelicerata
- Class: Arachnida
- Order: Araneae
- Infraorder: Araneomorphae
- Family: Pholcidae
- Genus: Litoporus
- Species: L. saul

Binomial name
- Litoporus saul Huber, 2000

Species of spider

Litoporus saul is a cellar spider species found in French Guiana.
