= Litoporus =

Scientific classification
- Kingdom: Animalia
- Phylum: Arthropoda
- Subphylum: Chelicerata
- Class: Arachnida
- Order: Araneae
- Infraorder: Araneomorphae
- Family: Pholcidae
- Genus: Litoporus; Simon, 1893

Type species
- L. aerius Simon, 1893

Species
- 11, see text

Synonyms
- Tonoro González-Sponga, 2009

Genus of spiders

Litoporus is a genus of cellar spiders that was first described by Eugène Louis Simon in 1893.

== Species ==
As of June 2019 it contains eleven species, found only in South America:

- Litoporus aerius Simon, 1893 (type) – Venezuela
- Litoporus agricola Mello-Leitão, 1922 – Brazil
- Litoporus dimona Huber, 2000 – Brazil
- Litoporus iguassuensis Mello-Leitão, 1918 – Brazil
- Litoporus lopez Huber, 2000 – Colombia
- Litoporus manu Huber, 2000 – Peru
- Litoporus pakitza Huber, 2000 – Peru
- Litoporus saul Huber, 2000 – French Guiana
- Litoporus secoya Huber, 2000 – Colombia
- Litoporus uncatus (Simon, 1893) – Northern South America
- Litoporus yucumo Huber, 2000 – Bolivia

== See also ==
- List of Pholcidae species
