= Litoporus pakitza =

Scientific classification
- Domain: Eukaryota
- Kingdom: Animalia
- Phylum: Arthropoda
- Subphylum: Chelicerata
- Class: Arachnida
- Order: Araneae
- Infraorder: Araneomorphae
- Family: Pholcidae
- Genus: Litoporus
- Species: L. pakitza

Binomial name
- Litoporus pakitza Huber, 2000

Species of spider

Litoporus pakitza is a cellar spider species found in Peru.

== See also ==
- List of Pholcidae species
