= Litoporus manu =

Scientific classification
- Kingdom: Animalia
- Phylum: Arthropoda
- Subphylum: Chelicerata
- Class: Arachnida
- Order: Araneae
- Infraorder: Araneomorphae
- Family: Pholcidae
- Genus: Litoporus
- Species: L. manu

Binomial name
- Litoporus manu Huber, 2000

Species of spider

Litoporus manu is a cellar spider species found in Peru.

== Taxonomic references ==
- Litoporus manu Huber, 2000: 305, f. 1226-1230 (Dm).

== See also ==
- List of Pholcidae species
