= Levy Adcock =

American gridiron football player (born 1988)

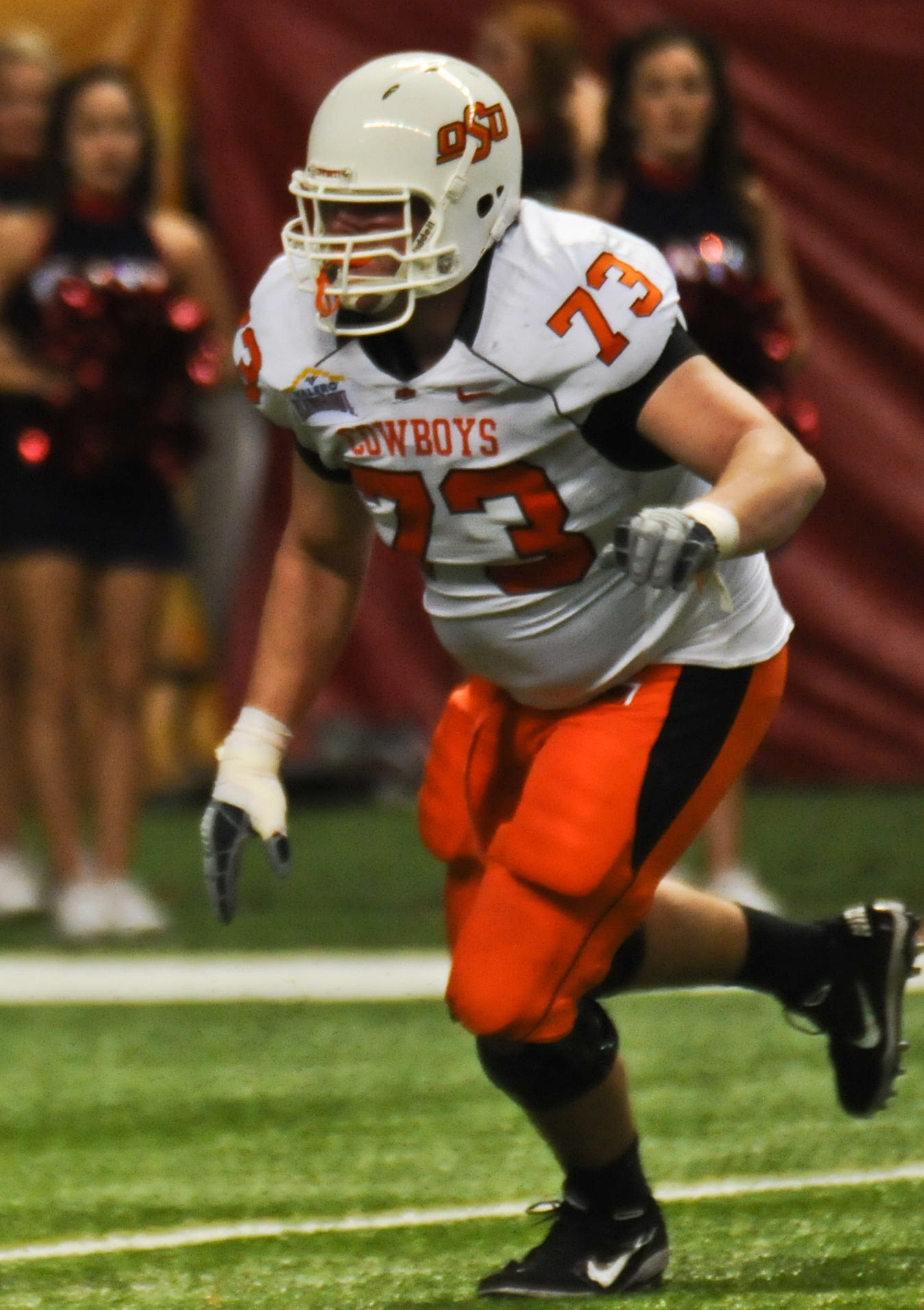
- Adcock playing for Oklahoma State in 2010

No. 65, 64, 75
- Position: Offensive tackle

Personal information
- Born: November 12, 1988 (age 37); Claremore, Oklahoma, U.S.
- Listed height: 6 ft 6 in (1.98 m)
- Listed weight: 324 lb (147 kg)

Career information
- High school: Sequoyah (Claremore)
- College: Oklahoma State
- NFL draft: 2012: undrafted

Career history
- Dallas Cowboys (2012)*; Sacramento Mountain Lions (2012); New York Giants (2012–2013)*; Saskatchewan Roughriders (2014–2015); BC Lions (2016)
- * Offseason or practice squad member only

Awards and highlights
- Consensus All-American (2011); First-team All-Big 12 (2010, 2011)
- Stats at Pro Football Reference
- Stats at CFL.ca (archive)

Levy Adcock (born November 12, 1988) is an American former football player. He played college football for the Oklahoma State Cowboys, earning consensus All-American in 2011. He was signed by the Dallas Cowboys as an undrafted free agent following the 2012 NFL draft.

== Early life ==
Adcock was born in Claremore, Oklahoma. He attended Sequoyah High School in Claremore, and he played football, baseball and basketball for the Sequoyah Eagles. He was the first player in Rogers County history to be named all-county in each sport. He helped lead Claremore Sequoyah to their first ever state championship in football. That team went 14–0.

== College career ==
Adcock originally attended Northeastern Oklahoma A&M College, but transferred to Oklahoma State and played for the Oklahoma State Cowboys football team from 2009 to 2011. He spent his first year with the Cowboys mainly on special teams, but would occasionally line up as a fourth tight end. In 2010, he became a starter and was a first-team All Big 12 selection after not allowing a quarterback sack during the entire season. Following his senior season in 2011, he was a first-team All-Big 12 selection for the second consecutive year, and was recognized as a consensus first-team All-American.

== Professional career ==
Adcock went undrafted in the 2012 NFL draft but was signed as a free agent by the Dallas Cowboys.

Adcock played for the Saskatchewan Roughriders, having signed a contract in May 2014.
