= USS Sequoia (presidential yacht) =

Former United States presidential yacht

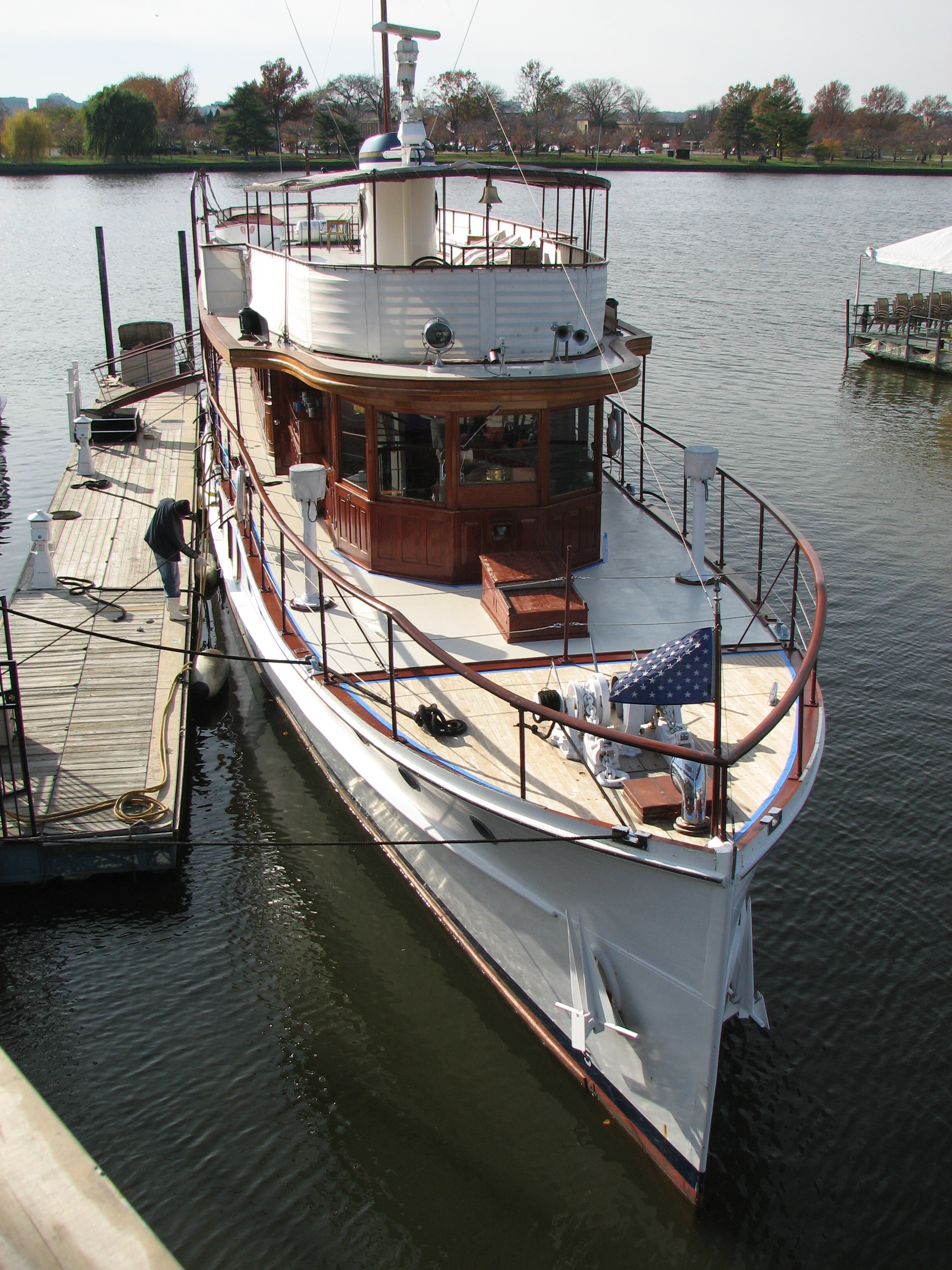
- Sequoia in Washington Marina in 2008

History
- Name: Sequoia II
- Namesake: Sequoyah
- Owner: Richard Cadwalader (1925–1928); William Dunning (1928–1931)
- Builder: Mathis Yacht Building Co., Camden, New Jersey
- Cost: $200,000
- Laid down: 1924
- Launched: 1925
- Name: Sequoia
- Owner: United States Department of Commerce
- Acquired: By purchase, 24 March 1931
- In service: 1931
- Out of service: 1933
- Name: USS Sequoia (AG-23)
- Owner: United States Navy
- Commissioned: 25 March 1933
- Decommissioned: 1936
- Name: Sequoia
- Owner: Secretary of the Navy
- In service: 1936
- Out of service: 1977
- Stricken: 1 October 1968
- Fate: Sold at auction 18 May 1977

General characteristics
- Type: Yacht
- Displacement: 90 long tons (91 t)
- Length: 104 ft (32 m)
- Beam: 18 ft 2 in (5.54 m)
- Draft: 4 ft 5 in (1.35 m)
- Speed: 12 knots (22 km/h; 14 mph)
- Complement: 10
- Armament: None
- USS Sequoia (yacht)
- U.S. National Register of Historic Places
- U.S. National Historic Landmark
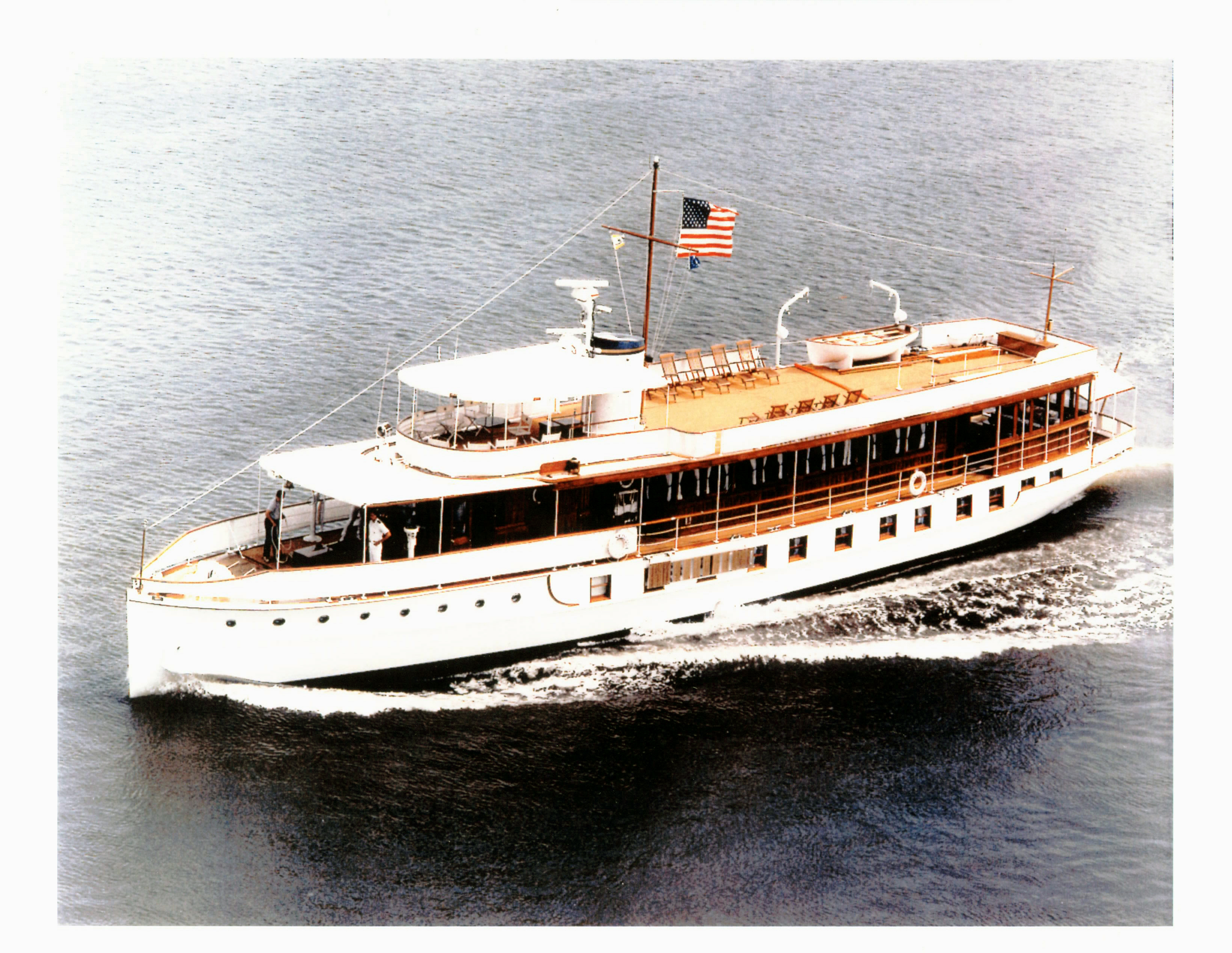
- USS Sequoia

- Location within Maryland
- Location: Richardson Maritime Museum, Cambridge, Maryland
- Coordinates: 38.571°N 76.071°W
- Built: 1925
- Architect: Trumpy, John; Mathis Yacht Building Co.
- NRHP reference No.: 87002594

Significant dates
- Added to NRHP: December 23, 1987
- Designated NHL: 23 December 1987

USS Sequoia is the former presidential yacht used during the administrations of Herbert Hoover through Jimmy Carter. To set a cost-cutting example, Carter ordered her sold in 1977.

Often called the "floating White House", the Sequoia offered presidents, first families and high-ranking government officials a place to escape the complexities of official life while also serving as the backdrop for significant moments of 20th-century American history.

A congressional resolution passed in December 1985 stated, "Sequoia was the setting for Presidential meetings, negotiations and decisions of extraordinary significance for and effect on the history of the United States and the course of world events" and "recognized the unique significance of the former Presidential yacht Sequoia which has made her a symbol of American political heritage and the Office of the President".

Sequoia was designated as a National Historic Landmark in 1988 and according to a statement made by the president of the Mystic Seaport Museum to The New York Times, "The Sequoia is probably the most significant artifact of presidential importance that is in private hands".

Formally decommissioned on December 9, 1935, by President Franklin Delano Roosevelt, the Sequoia continues to carry its "USS" designation.

The Sequoia is believed to have been named by her original owner, Emily Roebling Cadwalader, after Sequoyah, a leader of the Cherokee Nation.

== Design and construction ==
Designed by John Trumpy and built by the famed John H. Mathis & Company Shipbuilders in Camden, New Jersey, Sequoia was completed at a cost of approximately $200,000 and launched October 27, 1925. Originally named the Sequoia II, she was the second of four successively larger yachts built between 1924 and 1931 for Mr. and Mrs. Richard McCall Cadwalader of Philadelphia. The Cadwaladers' third and fourth yachts were named Savarona and Savarona II, respectively.

At 104 feet in length, Sequoia II's hull was originally constructed of long-leaf yellow pine on white oak frames and her deckhouse of mahogany and teak. She is capable of comfortably sleeping eight guests in her three double and two single staterooms, has ample crew quarters and can seat 22 for formal dinners.

=== Richard M. Cadwalader and Emily Roebling Cadwalader ===
Richard Cadwalader was a prominent Philadelphia banker and his wife, Emily Roebling Cadwalader, was an heiress to the Roebling fortune. Emily was the granddaughter of John Augustus Roebling, chief engineer and original designer of the Brooklyn Bridge, and was named after her paternal aunt, Emily Warren Roebling.

Emily Roebling Cadwalader became the driving force behind the four exceptional yachts constructed for the Cadwaladers, culminating in 1931 with the 446-foot Savarona II.

=== Sequoia II's christening and early use ===
Local newspapers recount that on October 26, 1925 after arriving with her party in two Rolls-Royce automobiles, Mrs. Cadwalader broke a bottle of champagne against the bow of the Sequoia II commemorating its service to her family. Oddly, these accounts of Sequoia II's christening make no mention of prohibition when discussing the champagne. The Cadwaladers sailed Sequoia II on various high-profile trips to the coasts of Florida during 1925 and 1926, including to West Palm Beach and Miami.

Three years after being built for the Cadwaladers, Sequoia II was sold to William Dunning, a Houston-based oil executive who used the vessel for various gambling trips to Cuba and business-related travel along the Mexican coastline. Dunning was forced to sell Sequoia II during the Great Depression.

== U.S. Government service ==
On March 24, 1931, the U.S. Bureau of Navigation within the Department of Commerce purchased Sequoia II from Dunning for approximately $40,000. Sequoia II initially was used to patrol the Chesapeake and Delaware Bays as a decoy vessel to attract would-be bootleggers. In hope of selling illegal liquor, bootleggers would come alongside what was seen as a wealthy family's yacht only to be arrested.

=== Presidential service ===
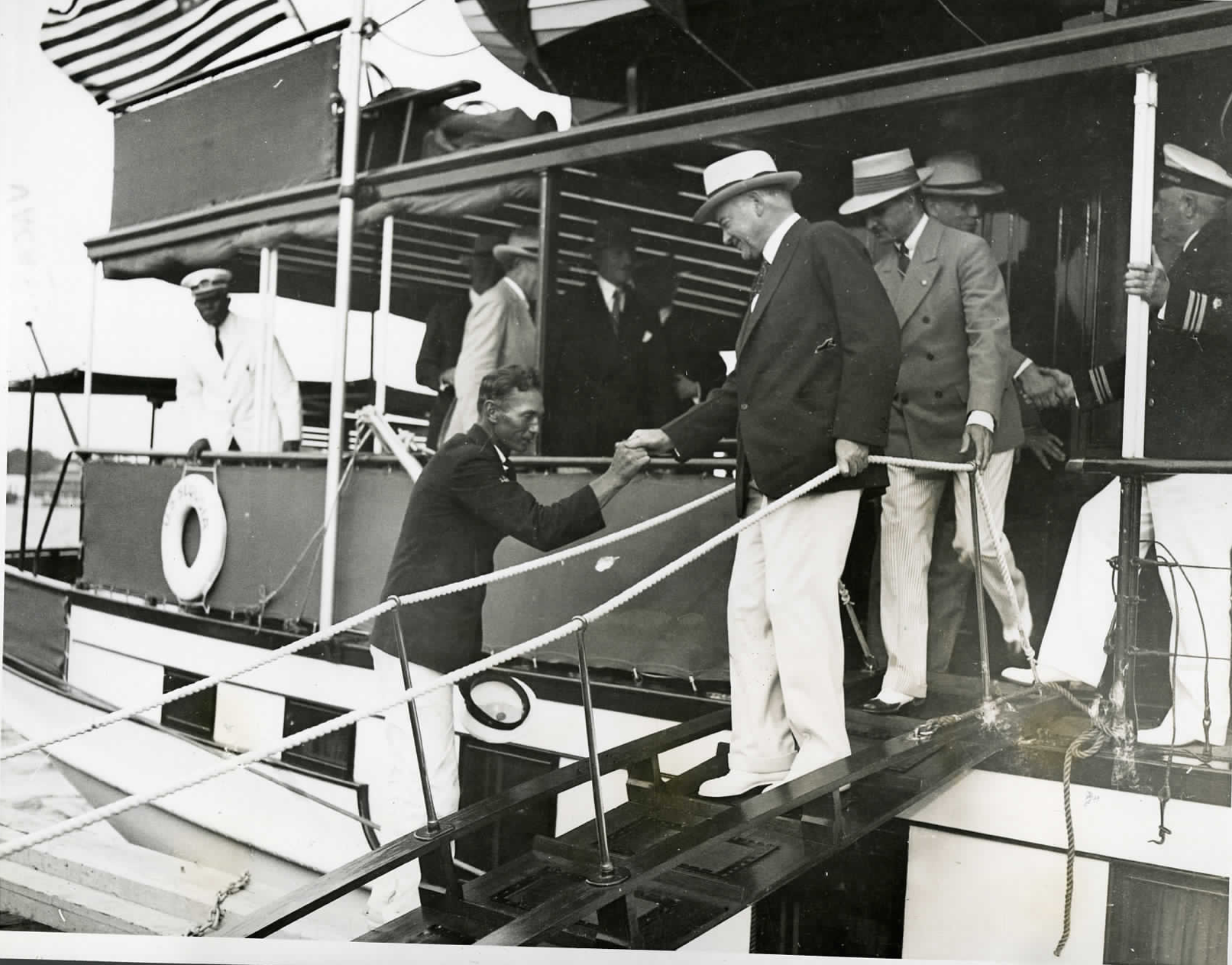
President Herbert Hoover disembarking from the USS Sequoia August 8, 1932

==== Hoover Administration ====
Herbert Hoover was known to have an affection for Mathis-Trumpy houseboats, such as Sequoia, and had spent time both between his election victory and inauguration and during the early part of his administration cruising and fishing in Florida aboard the yacht Saunterer, a 98-foot Mathis-Trumpy house boat owned by his friend, Jeremiah Milbank.

Having decommissioned the former presidential yacht The Mayflower in 1929, Herbert Hoover initiated Sequoia II's presidential service by using her on various occasions during the final years of his Administration. This included four documented voyages from 1931 to 1933 for official presidential business as well as for pleasure cruises. Various news outlets reported on the status of Hoover's fishing trips aboard Sequoia. During 1932, President and Mrs. Hoover spent both Christmas and New Year's Eve aboard the Sequoia II as part of a ten-day fishing trip along the Georgia and Florida coastlines. Hoover used a photo of the indulgent yacht on his 1932 White House Christmas Card, when many Americans were suffering through the Depression and struggling for basic necessities.

==== Roosevelt Administration ====
President Franklin D. Roosevelt used the yacht more frequently, with over fifty recorded outings between 1933 and 1935. On March 25, 1933, what was now known simply as Sequoia and no longer Sequoia II, became the official presidential yacht after it was transferred from the Department of Commerce to the Naval Department. An elevator was installed to enable access for the polio-stricken President, who, like Hoover before him, enjoyed fishing aboard Sequoia and also used the vessel for important meetings and summits.

On April 23, 1933, President Roosevelt hosted British Prime Minister James Ramsay MacDonald as his first guest on the Sequoia. During a cruise to Mount Vernon they discussed the Great Depression, demilitarization, Adolf Hitler's rise and strategies for averting the threat of a potential new war with Germany. As it became clear these efforts were failing and war approached, the wooden Sequoia was deemed unsafe for the President, and on December 9, 1935, Sequoia was officially reassigned to the Secretary of the Navy and the steel-hulled USS Potomac was designated as the presidential yacht. For the next three decades, Sequoia served at the pleasure of the United States Secretary of the Navy until its recommissioning in 1969 as a presidential yacht.

==== Truman Administration ====
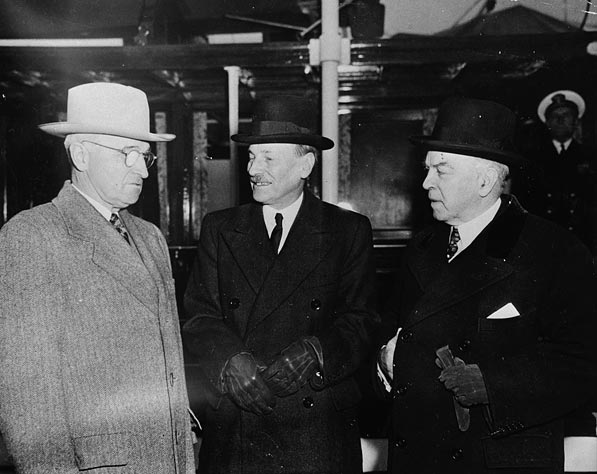
President Harry Truman and prime ministers Clement Attlee and Mackenzie King board the Sequoia for discussions about nuclear weapons, November 1945

While serving as the yacht for the Secretary of the Navy, U.S. presidents and members of the Cabinet continued to use the Sequoia, often providing the backdrop for critical moments in American history.

President Harry S. Truman who used the USS Williamsburg as his official yacht, nevertheless called upon Sequoia to host the first atomic arms control talks. Just three months after the dropping of atomic bombs on Hiroshima and Nagasaki, it was aboard the Sequoia during a November 1945 cruise down the Potomac past Mount Vernon that Truman first discussed the promise of atomic power and the need to control atomic weapons with the United States' closest allied leaders, Prime Ministers Clement Attlee of Great Britain and Mackenzie King of Canada. On September 16, 1946, then General Dwight David Eisenhower's calendar shows he met aboard the Sequoia with U.S. Fleet Admiral Chester W. Nimitz, General Carl Spaatz, and British Field Marshal Bernard Law Montgomery. This meeting, under the guise of a cruise to Mount Vernon, initiated a series of highly classified political and military discussions from which emerged the Western European Union, which formed in 1948, followed by NATO a year later. General Eisenhower later served from 1951 to 1952 as the first Supreme Commander of NATO.

==== Eisenhower Administration ====
On election to the presidency, Eisenhower ordered his Joint Chiefs of Staff (including Admiral Arthur W. Radford, the Chairman of the Joint Chiefs) to meet on the Sequoia to further formulate and develop a plan for implementing Eisenhower's "New Look" defensive policy. On August 6, 1953, Admiral Radford and his fellow Chiefs set sail in the Chesapeake Bay aboard the Sequoia. The military leaders understood the President wanted a consensus and it was not until late on August 8, once the Chiefs had all signed what would be known as the "Sequoia Report", that the Sequoia returned to Washington. The Sequoia Report helped introduce a defensive strategy to reduce the overall size and cost of the military and rely heavily on nuclear deterrence, a doctrine that would serve as a defining turning point in U.S. strategy during the Cold War.

==== Kennedy Administration ====
President Kennedy's use of Sequoia is not as well documented as that of other presidents. Government photographers did not accompany him on the yacht, and immediately after his assassination, an order was given to destroy all personal logs associated with Sequoia's use during the Kennedy Administration.

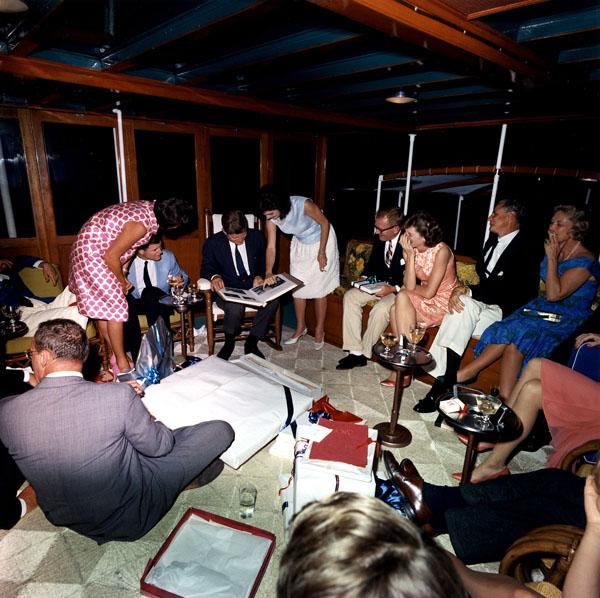
John F. Kennedy opening gifts with family and friends on board USS Sequoia May 29, 1963

During October 1962, President Kennedy held strategy meetings on Sequoia to discuss the Cuban Missile Crisis. On May 29, 1963, the Kennedys hosted a cruise to celebrate the President's 46th and final birthday. At 8 pm, the couple boarded Sequoia to the music of two orchestras. With 25 friends and family, the President and his guests danced after a meal of roast filet and Dom Perignon. In the words of Clement Norton, a close Kennedy family friend who was aboard that night, "You never can imagine anything happier or more normal or nice." The iconic photographs documenting the President's last birthday were not taken by an official White House photographer, but by the navy officer in charge of Sequoia using his own Kodak Instamatic camera.

At the time President Kennedy was assassinated in Dallas on November 22, 1963 he and the First Lady were scheduled to host friends for a Sunday cruise aboard Sequoia, two days later, on November 24, 1963. In April 1964, the widowed Mrs. Kennedy spent an evening aboard Sequoia with a group of President Kennedy's closest friends. Frank Gannon, the piano player aboard that day, recounts a poignantly sad story of Mrs. Kennedy requesting him to play "Me and My Shadow" a song about being alone. On May 27, 1964, two days before what would have been Kennedy's 47th birthday, his closest family and some friends once again gathered aboard Sequoia for a dinner cruise documented by Kennedy speechwriter and presidential historian, Arthur Schlesinger Jr.

==== Johnson Administration ====
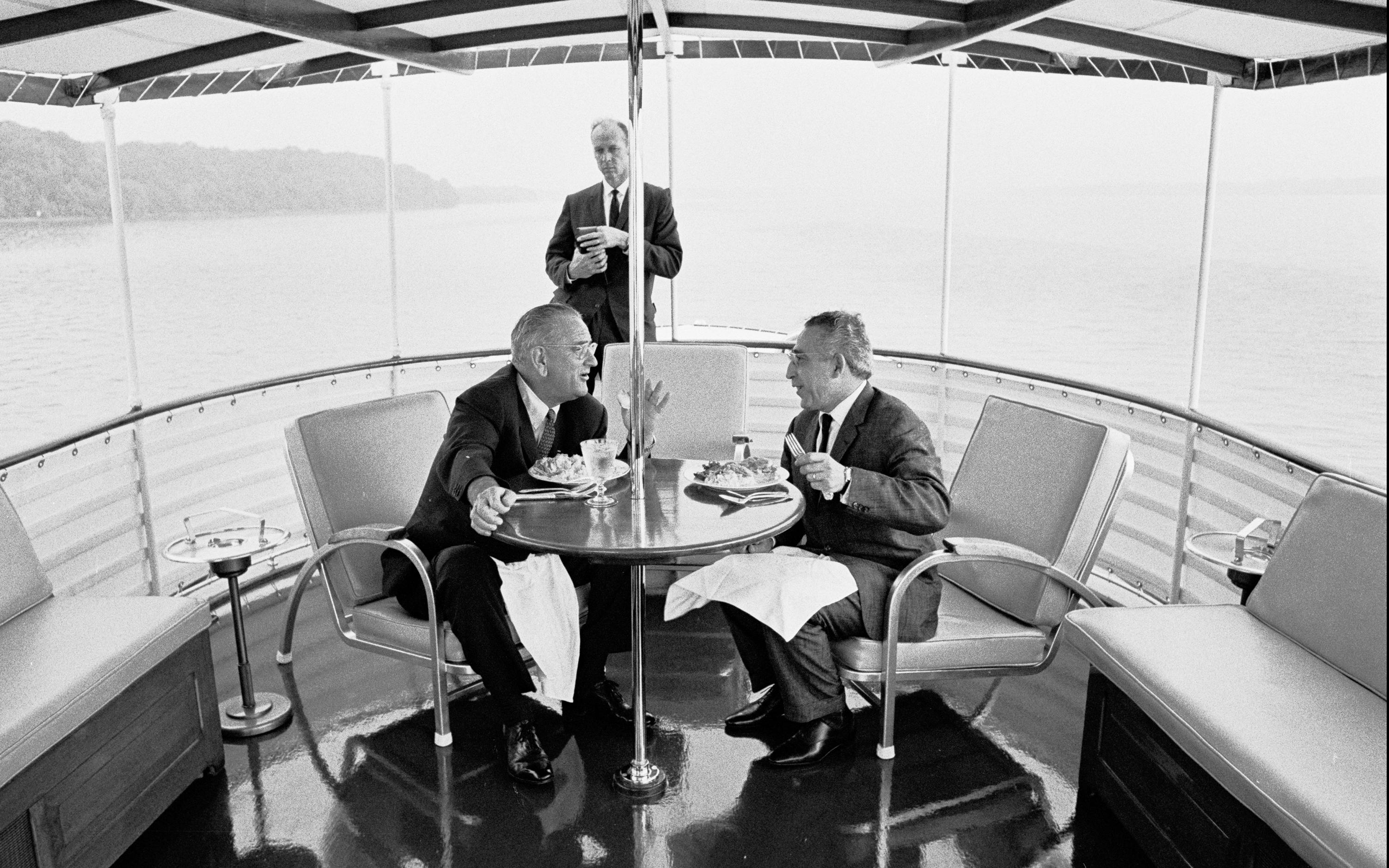
President Johnson has dinner with guest aboard the Sequoia as Secret Service Agent Rufus Youngblood stands in the background, July 15, 1965

In an interview after her husband had left office, former first Lady, Lady Bird Johnson, remembered the Johnsons' "love affair with the Sequoia goes back indeed to 1949." Having become friends with then Secretary of the Navy and soon to be Secretary of Defense, James Forrestal, the future president and First Lady had been invited guests aboard the ship on numerous occasions during the Roosevelt and Truman Administrations.

As Kennedy's vice president, Johnson made eight recorded trips aboard Sequoia. As president, Johnson's use of Sequoia would increase, with more than 35 recorded trips during his five years in office. During 1964, President Johnson ordered FDR's elevator removed and a bar installed in its place. Johnson used Sequoia to lobby members of congress on critical legislative matters including civil rights and to strategize with his advisors regarding important decisions including escalation of the Vietnam war. Sequoia was used for hosting foreign ambassadors, as well as the leaders of Turkey and Greece who discussed the ongoing issue of Cyprus. President Johnson frequently used Sequoia as a place to unwind and watch a film.

==== Nixon Administration ====
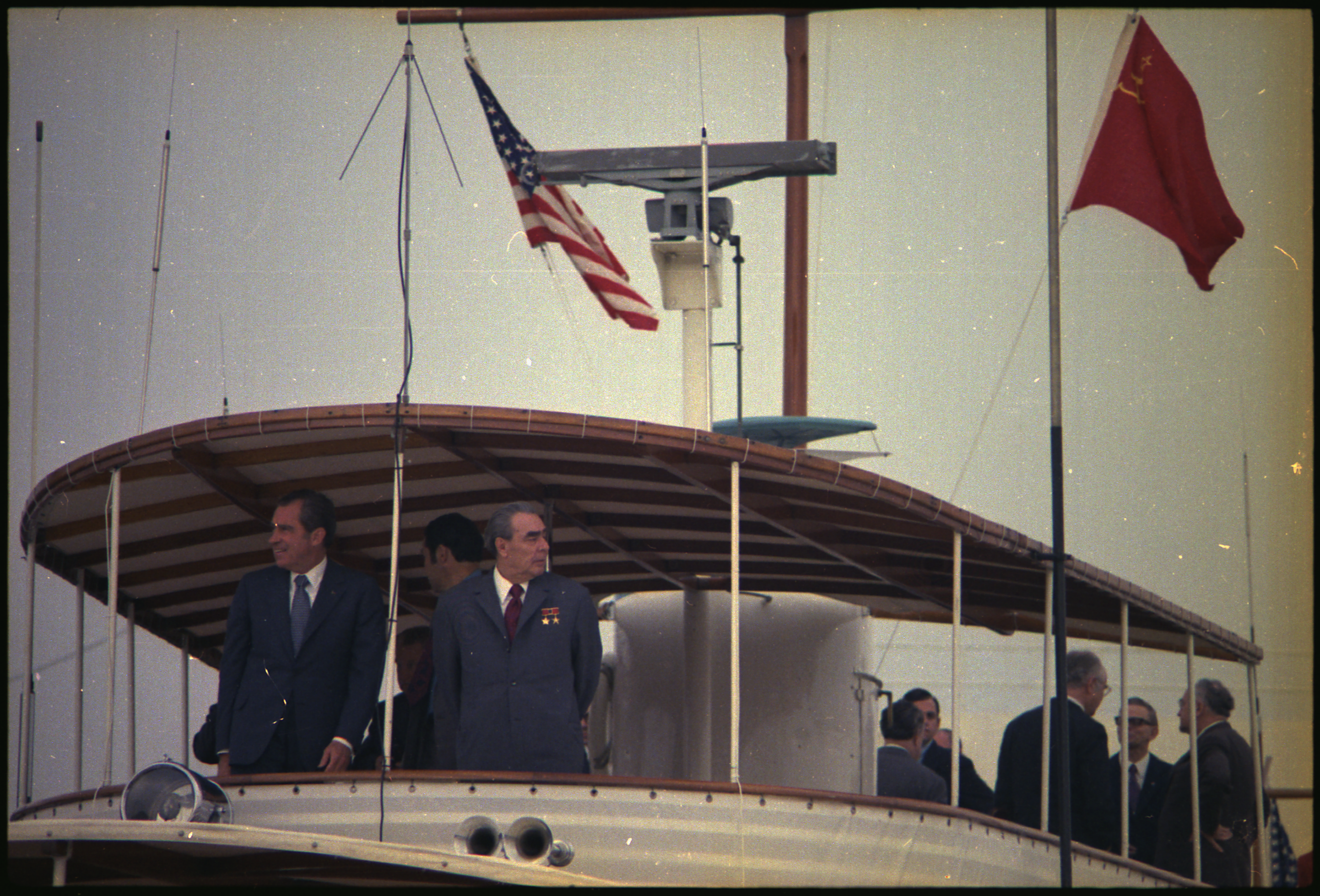
President Nixon and Secretary Brezhnev on board the Sequoia June 19, 1973

Sequoia's most frequent presidential passenger was Johnson's successor, Richard Nixon. President Nixon recorded more than 80 trips aboard the yacht while in office.

On June 19, 1973, a party of U.S. and Soviet diplomats accompanied the President and General Secretary Leonid Brezhnev on a working dinner aboard the yacht. Throughout their cruise, the leaders discussed an agreement between the U.S. and the Soviet Union, regarding the prevention of nuclear war, which was signed by Nixon and Brezhnev two days later on June 22, 1973, during the Washington Summit. It was aboard the Sequoia that Nixon decided to resign and informed his family. In a 1983 interview conducted by Frank Gannon of the Nixon Foundation titled, "The Smoking Gun and the Sequoia", Nixon describes the August 5, 1974, cruise aboard the Sequoia during which he learned that a court had ordered him to release the transcript of a tape recording which showed he approved the cover-up of the Watergate break-in.

==== Ford Administration ====
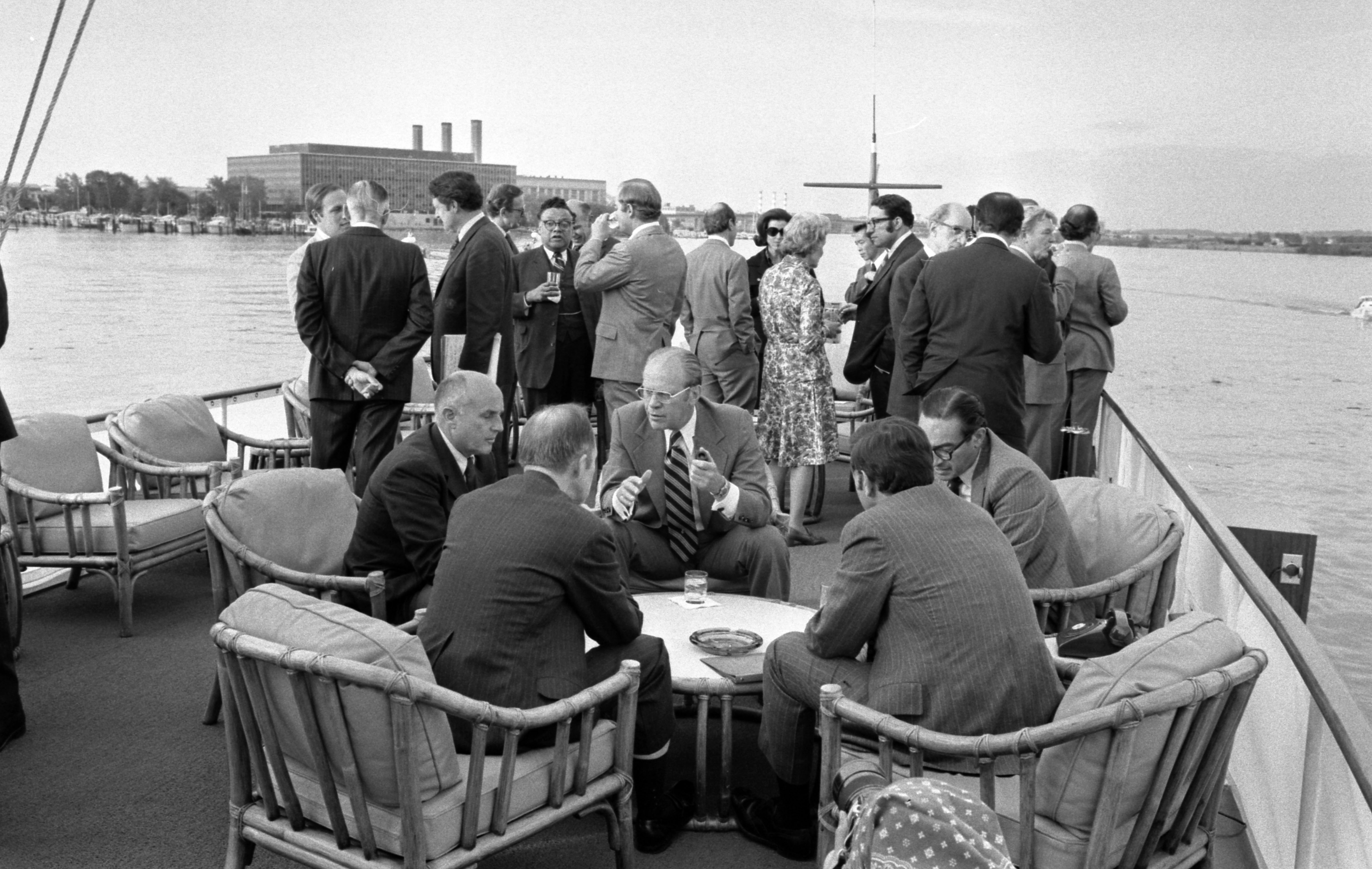
President Gerald Ford holds a Cabinet meeting aboard the Sequoia, May 1975

Following President Nixon's resignation on August 9, 1974, Gerald Ford assumed the presidency. Ford used Sequoia less than Nixon. In May 1975, Ford was the first known president to host a Cabinet meeting aboard the vessel. Lasting four hours, the President and his cabinet discussed wide-ranging issues facing the United States, including a discussion regarding Congressional relations, confronting the issue of Vietnamese refugees, and the status of the U.S. Energy program in light of the 1973 oil crisis.

Later that summer, Happy Rockefeller, wife of Vice President Nelson Rockefeller, entertained Mutsuko Miki (wife of the Prime Minister of Japan) on a cruise along the Potomac during a state visit. Similarly, in October 1975, the yacht would cruise along the Potomac to entertain Emperor Hirohito and the accompanying delegation from Japan. Another notable visitor aboard the Sequoia during the Ford years was the prime minister of Canada, Pierre Trudeau, who in 1976 had a working dinner with the President aboard Sequoia.

President Ford celebrated his 62nd birthday on the Sequoia shortly after a surprise party given by White House staff. In 1975, Susan Ford hosted a pre-prom party aboard the yacht with a group of friends, and then celebrated her 19th birthday aboard the Sequoia the following year. First Lady Betty Ford hosted a June 9, 1976 Sequoia cruise in celebration of Happy Rockefeller's 50th birthday.

==== Carter Administration ====
After 46 years of government service, citing cost concerns – the Sequoia cost taxpayers an estimated $800,000 annually – President Jimmy Carter ordered the Sequoia be sold at auction. Carter would later recall selling the yacht as a mistake. In his 2015 autobiography "A Full Life: Reflections at 90", President Carter wrote of selling Sequoia, I was determined to be strict on expenditures for the nation, and to set an example in my personal life. I decided to sell the presidential yacht Sequoia, and to minimize the playing of 'Ruffles and Flourishes' when I arrived at public meetings. I was surprised when some of these changes proved to be quite unpopular, and to learn how much the public cherished the pomp and ceremony of the presidency. In a conversation with broadcaster Ray Suarez, Carter said: "People thought I was not being reverent enough to the office I was holding, that I was too much of a peanut farmer, not enough of an aristocrat, or something like that. So I think that shows that the American people want something of, an element of, image of monarchy in the White House."

=== Winston Churchill and the Sequoia ===
Sequoia served as refuge for presidents to relax with friends and conduct business outside of the public spotlight. As a result, no official documentary evidence exists for many events which took place aboard the yacht, and certain lore has developed, particularly regarding British Prime Minister Winston Churchill's activities aboard Sequoia. This includes, but is not limited to, Churchill and Roosevelt planning D-Day together on the large table in Sequoia's main salon, Churchill gifting deck chairs from the Queen Mary for Sequoia's upper deck and Churchill being the impetus behind Roosevelt decommissioning the USS Sequoia so that the two leaders could drink on board – alcoholic beverages were prohibited aboard commissioned naval vessels. Despite these persistent legends, Churchill was never documented as being aboard the yacht.

== Private ownership ==
Sequoia has been owned by seven different owners since being sold by the U.S. government in 1977. Several of the past owners sought to offset the costs of maintaining and operating the vessel by offering Sequoia for private charter, while others have been non-profit groups seeking to maintain her for historical reasons and/or return her to presidential service.

Thomas Malloy purchased Sequoia from the U.S. government on May 18, 1977 for $286,000. Three months later, Malloy resold Sequoia to a partnership led by Norman Pulliam for $355,000. Mr. Pulliam maintained Sequoia in Myrtle Beach, South Carolina and then sold her to The Ocean Learning Institute of Palm Beach, Florida during March 1980 for $750,000. The institute used Sequoia to entertain potential donors.

The Presidential Yacht Trust, a non-profit organization, acquired Sequoia from the Institute for approximately $1.1 million in 1980 and brought Sequoia back to Washington, D.C. for use by the president and his cabinet. Michael Doud Gill, who headed the yacht trust, said, "There is some feeling in the White House that [the president] should not be on a million-dollar yacht when he has to cut programs such as food stamps and such." Reagan authorized his Cabinet's use of Sequoia, and during an August 1982 luncheon aboard the yacht, EPA administrator Anne Gorsuch Burford allegedly told eight Reagan Administration officials that she was holding back federal funds to clean up a toxic waste site near Los Angeles to avoid helping the Senate campaign of California's then-Governor Jerry Brown, a Democrat. (When Congress charged the EPA had mishandled such toxic waste Superfund sites and demanded records, Gorsuch refused and became the first agency director in U.S. history to be cited for contempt of Congress.) During 1984, Sequoia received a hero's welcome as she was taken on an eight-month, 6,000-mile tour of the country.

A congressional resolution written to assist the Trust in bringing Sequoia back into government service, passed in December 1985. Sequoia underwent a $2 million restoration in 1986 before participating in the flotilla of vessels celebrating the centennial of the Statue of Liberty on July 4, 1986. Vice President George H.W. Bush used Sequoia in May 1987 to host a day of meetings with Yang Shangkun, who subsequently served as President of China from 1988 to 1993. Sequoia was designated as a National Historic Landmark in March 1988. Political considerations dictated that if the Sequoia were to be returned to the government for use by the president, the cost should not be born by the U.S. government. The Trust was surprised by the Navy's requirement that the Trust not only pay for the yacht and its operations but also the security which would be required by the President. Unable to pay a $2 million repair bill, title to the yacht was transferred to the Virginia shipyard and Sequoia spent six years in storage.

Upon taking office, the Clinton White House worked closely with the Trust during 1993 and 1994 to have Kuwait purchase Sequoia from the Virginia yard where she was being stored and transfer title to the Trust as gift to the American people and a gesture of gratitude to the US for leading a coalition of 34 countries in liberating Kuwait after Saddam Hussein's 1990 Iraqi invasion.

A Japanese buyer was about to purchase Sequoia and move her to Tokyo, when the Sequoia Presidential Yacht Group LLC purchased Sequoia from the Virginia shipyard in September 2000 for approximately $2.0 million and made her available in Washington, D.C. for private charters until 2014.

President Clinton attended one such event aboard Sequoia on October 17, 2000—making him the 10th person who served as U.S. president to walk upon Sequoia's decks—the full list includes: Herbert C. Hoover, Franklin D. Roosevelt, Harry S. Truman, Dwight D. Eisenhower, John F. Kennedy, Lyndon B. Johnson, Richard M. Nixon, Gerald R. Ford, George H. W. Bush (while vice president) and William J. Clinton.

In 2005, the Mystic Seaport Museum in Mystic, Connecticut entered into an exclusive six-month option agreement to purchase Sequoia from the Sequoia Presidential Yacht Group but was unable to raise the $20 million needed to buy, restore, and maintain the vessel. Upon the expiration of its option, the museum's president told The New York Times, "[He] was disappointed because the Sequoia, a national historic landmark, is probably the most desirable vessel in private hands."

Sequoia is currently owned by FE Partners, a portfolio company of the Washington, D.C.-based Equator Capital Group which purchased Sequoia in October 2016 for $7.8 million. Equator Capital is controlled by L. Michael Cantor and began the process of restoring the Sequoia at a repair yard in Belfast, Maine. When asked about future plans by MegaYacht News, Cantor said, "Once restored, our intention is to bring Sequoia back to Washington where she will serve as a venue to teach American presidential history and promote ocean conservation causes".

FE Partners purchased Sequoia after a protracted litigation with The Sequoia Presidential Yacht Group, the former owner who believed Sequoia to be worth significantly more than the $7.8 million purchase price and filed a January 2013 lawsuit against FE Partners to block the sale. As part of a loan agreement, the former owner had provided FE Partners with an option to purchase Sequoia for $13 million or in the event of a default under the loan agreement for $7.8 million. On August 29, 2013, a Delaware Court entered a Default Judgment against the former owner and confirmed FE Partner's contractual right to purchase Sequoia for $7.8 million. On November 14, 2017, the same Delaware Court found the aggregate amount of funds which had been loaned by FE Partners to the former owner, legal fees, Sequoia's third-party debts and the cost to repair Sequoia exceeded the $7.8 million purchase price. As a consequence, the Court also ruled FE Partners was not required to pay any additional funds to the former owner.

Upon purchasing Sequoia in October 2016, FE Partners filed a lawsuit against Chesapeake Boat Works of Deltaville, Virginia, which had damaged Sequoia while hauling her out of the water on a marine railway during December 2014. FE Partners won a $700,000 settlement award against the Virginia shipyard on February 22, 2019, and then began the process of removing Sequoia from the railway, placing her on a barge and transporting the barge from Virginia to Maine.

=== Restoration (2019–present) ===
In September 2019, the Sequoia was first moved by barge from Deltaville, Virginia, to Cambridge, Maryland, and then during October, to Belfast, Maine, to begin a restoration by French & Webb Inc for an undisclosed price. According to MegaYacht News, the Sequoia restoration would require 9 to 10 months of careful planning before the refurbishment itself could start. French and his team sourced woods to supplement and/or replace the yacht's long-leaf yellow pine, mahogany, and teak. In October 2023, Sequoia returned to Cambridge for an estimated five-year, $15 million renovation. In April 2025, the Richardson Maritime Museum, on whose property the yacht is docked, hosted a reunion dinner for Sequoia crew members who served during the Nixon administration.

== See also ==
- List of official vehicles of the president of the United States, which includes the other presidential yachts
