= Tim Martin (American football) =

American football player (born 1976)

No. 50, 92, 89, 96
- Position: Offensive lineman / Defensive lineman

Personal information
- Born: April 12, 1976 (age 50)
- Listed height: 6 ft 5 in (1.96 m)
- Listed weight: 273 lb (124 kg)

Career information
- High school: Sequoyah (Claremore, Oklahoma)
- College: Tulsa
- NFL draft: 1999: undrafted

Career history
- New England Patriots (1999)*; Rhein Fire (2000)*; Barcelona Dragons (2000); Oklahoma Wranglers (2000); Miami Dolphins (2000)*; Chicago Enforcers (2001); Oklahoma Wranglers (2001); New York Dragons (2002)*; Dallas Desperados (2002–2003); New Orleans VooDoo (2004–2005); Grand Rapids Rampage (2006); San Jose SaberCats (2007)
- * Offseason or practice squad member only

Awards and highlights
- ArenaBowl champion (2007); Second-team All-Arena (2004)

Career AFL statistics
- Tackles: 98
- Sacks: 18.5
- Forced fumbles: 4
- Fumble recoveries: 4
- Pass breakups: 7
- Stats at ArenaFan.com

Tim Martin (born April 12, 1976) is an American former professional football lineman who played eight seasons in the Arena Football League with the Oklahoma Wranglers, Dallas Desperados, New Orleans VooDoo, Grand Rapids Rampage and San Jose SaberCats. He played college football at the University of Tulsa. He was also a member of the Miami Dolphins, Barcelona Dragons, Chicago Enforcers and New York Dragons.

== Early life ==
Martin attended Sequoyah High School in Claremore, Oklahoma.

== College career ==
Martin played college football for the Tulsa Golden Hurricane. He was three-year starter for the Hurricane, recording career totals of 177 tackles and five sacks. He started every game his senior year in 1998 while compiling three sacks and 60 tackles.

== Professional career ==
After going undrafted in the 1999 NFL draft, Martin signed with the New England Patriots on April 20, 1999. He was later released.

In February 2000, Martin was selected by the Rhein Fire in the 2000 NFL Europe draft. However, he did not play in any games for the Fire. He instead played in eight games for the Barcelona Dragons during the 2000 NFL Europe season, posting four sacks.

Martin then played in one game for the Oklahoma Wranglers of the Arena Football League (AFL) during the 2000 AFL season.

Martin signed with the Miami Dolphins on July 25, 2000. He was released by the Dolphins on August 26, 2000.

In October 2000, Martin was selected by the Chicago Enforcers in the 2001 XFL draft. He played in all ten games for the Enforcers during the 2001 season and was listed as a tight end.

Martin returned to the Wranglers after the XFL season ended and played in six games.

In December 2001, Martin was selected by the New York Dragons in the AFL dispersal draft. He was only a member of the Dragons during the 2002 offseason.

Martin was traded to the Dallas Desperados on February 20, 2002. He played for the team from 2002 to 2003.

Martin signed with the New Orleans VooDoo of the AFL on October 16, 2003. He played for the VooDoo from 2004 to 2005, earning second-team All-Arena honors in 2004.

Martin signed with the AFL's Grand Rapids Rampage on October 21, 2005, and played for the team during the 2006 season.

Martin was signed by the San Jose SaberCats of the AFL on February 4, 2007, and played for the team during the 2007 season.
