= Tim Martin (human rights) =

British human rights activist

- Occupation: Aid Worker
- Organization: Act Now
- Known for: Human Rights Activist

Tim Martin is the Director of the Human Rights Campaign group Act Now. As a former British humanitarian aid worker who worked in Sri Lanka, Martin founded Act Now with fellow aid workers after seeing human rights violations and mass killing in Sri Lanka against Tamils. In 2009, Martin went on a 21-day fast outside British Parliament to protest against the killing of Tamils in Sri Lanka.
