= Sequoia High School =

Sequoia High School can refer to:

- Sequoia High School (Redwood City, California)
- Sequoia High School (Visalia, California)
- Sequoia High School (Everett, Washington)

== See also ==
- Sequoyah High School (disambiguation)
