= Sequoia Middle School =

Sequoia Middle School can refer to one of several middle schools in California:

- Sequoia Middle School (Fontana, California)
- Sequoia Middle School (Newbury Park, California)
- Sequoia Middle School (Pleasant Hill, California)
- Sequoia Middle School (Redding, California)
