= MV Savarona =

Presidential yacht of Turkey

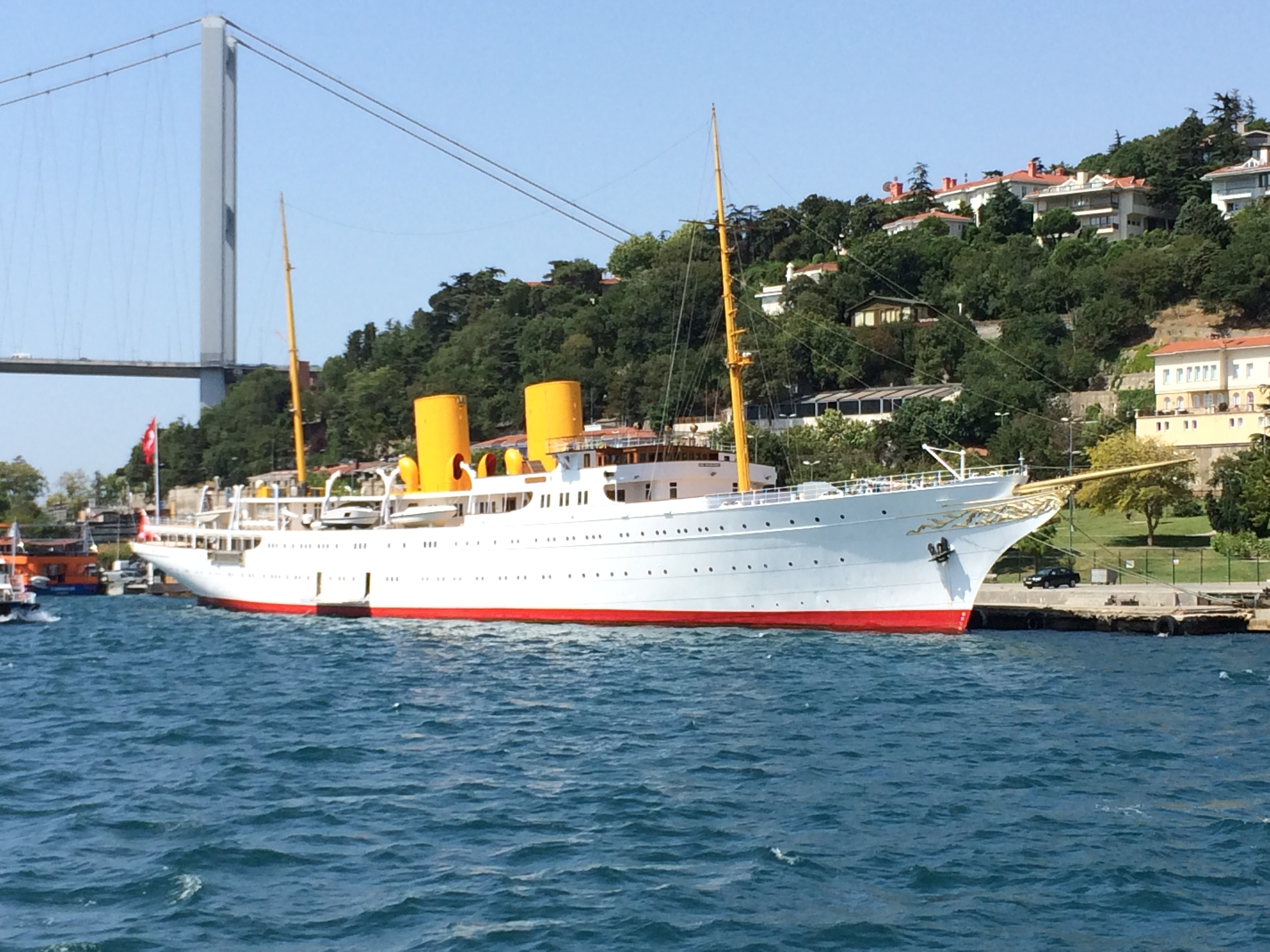
- Savarona at quay on the Bosphorus in 2014

History

United States
- Name: Savarona
- Owner: Emily Roebling Cadwalader
- Builder: Blohm & Voss; Hamburg, Germany
- Yard number: 490
- Launched: February 28, 1931
- Completed: March 1931
- In service: 1931–1938
- Fate: Sold to the Republic of Turkey

Turkey
- Name: Savarona
- Owner: Republic of Turkey
- Completed: Rebuilt 1989–1992; Modernized and retrofitted as state yacht 2014
- In service: 1938–1979, 1992–present
- Identification: IMO number: 5314810; MMSI number: 271000250
- Status: State Yacht

General characteristics
- Tonnage: 4,646 GT
- Length: 408 ft (124 m) waterline; 446 ft (136 m) - stern to bowsprit
- Beam: 53 ft (16 m)
- Height: 52 ft (16 m)
- Draft: 20 ft (6.1 m)
- Installed power: 2 × 3,600 hp (2.7 MW) diesel
- Speed: 15.5 knots (28.7 km/h) cruising; 18 knots (33 km/h) maximum
- Capacity: 34
- Crew: 44

The MV Savarona (also sometimes M/Y, for motor yacht) is the presidential yacht of the Republic of Turkey. She was the largest in the world when launched February 28, 1931, and remains, with a length of 136 m (446 ft), one of the world's longest. Although owned by the Government of Turkey, she had been leased out to Turkish businessman Kahraman Sadıkoğlu. However, upon orders of the Turkish Government, her lease was terminated and she reverted to the Turkish State. The first time she was used again for an official reception was in March 2015.

== History ==
Named for an African swan living in the Indian Ocean, the ship was designed by Gibbs & Cox for American heiress Emily Roebling Cadwalader, granddaughter of John A. Roebling, engineer of the Brooklyn Bridge. Savarona was the fifth and final vessel built for Mrs. Cadwalader and her husband Richard M. Cadwalader.

Savarona was built by Blohm & Voss in Hamburg, Germany, at a cost of about US$4 million ($84.7 million in 2025). She was equipped with Sperry gyro-stabilizers, and was described in 1949 by Jane's Fighting Ships as "probably the most sumptuously fitted yacht afloat."

In 1933, the ship was used as a film set while on the North Sea off the German coast. It appeared prominently in the German science-fiction film Gold, starring Hans Albers and Brigitte Helm. The movie premiered in 1934.

In 1938, the Turkish government acquired the yacht and gifted it to ailing leader Mustafa Kemal Atatürk, who spent only six weeks aboard before dying a few months later.

Throughout World War II, the ship lay idle in Kanlıca Bay on the Bosporus. In 1951, she was converted to the training ship Güneş Dil (English: Sun Language) and during the next years sailed to many countries. In October 1979, the ship was gutted by a fire at the Turkish Naval Academy off Heybeliada Island in the Sea of Marmara, and lay virtually abandoned for ten years.

In 1989, she was chartered for 49 years by Turkish businessman Kahraman Sadıkoğlu. Over three years, his firm completely refurbished her for about $45 million, removing the original steam turbine engines and installing modern Caterpillar diesel engines. The ship was rebuilt at Tuzla Shipyards in Tuzla, a suburb of Istanbul, for the stated purpose of serving famous and important guests and helping to keep the memory of Atatürk alive.

Sadıkoğlu chartered her out as a luxury cruise ship to private clients. In fall 2010, many Turkish media published news about the alleged presence of underage prostitutes in some of those cruises, causing a scandal. Sadıkoğlu, who was not present at the cruise, put in doubt the allegations later; but the lease contract was rescinded by the Turkish government.

After a new restoration period of 10 months, the Savarona was ready for official use in August 2014. On March 4, 2015 President Recep Tayyip Erdogan held the first official reception on board, including a short cruise along the Bosporus, with his guest the Bosnian politician Bakir Izetbegović.

== Features ==
Savarona has a swimming pool, an Islamic bath, a 282-foot (86 m) gold-trimmed grand staircase that survived from her original construction, a movie theater, and a library suite dedicated to Atatürk, which is furnished with many of his personal artifacts.

== Specifications ==
- Length: 1949: 349'6" waterline - 408'6" overall; 2010: 408 ft. waterline – 446 ft. stern to bowsprit
- Beam: 1949 and 2010: 53 ft.
- Draft: 1949: 20'6" mean; 2010: 20 ft.
- Tonnage: 1949: 5,710 tons displacement; 2010: 4,646 gross tonnage
- Engines: 1949: 6 geared turbines, 2 shafts, 10,750 h.p.; 1993: 2 × 3,600 h.p. [twin Caterpillar 3608 diesel engines]
- Boilers: 1949: 4 watertube, 400 lb. working pressure, oil fuel
- Speed: 1949: 18 knots (originally 21); 2010: 15.5 knots cruising, 18 knots maximum
- Radius: 1949: 9,000 miles at 15 knots
- Crew: 1949: 79; 2010: 44
- Staterooms: 2010: 17 double suites
- Armament: 1949: 2 3-pdr. naval guns
