= Hook, line, and sinker =

Hook, line and sinker may refer to:

- Hook, line and sinker, an English-language idiom
- Hook, line and sinker, a type of fishing equipment
- Hook, Line and Sinker (1930 film), a slapstick comedy starring Wheeler & Woolsey
- Hook, Line & Sinker (1969 film), a comedy starring Jerry Lewis
- Hook, Line and Sinker (TV program), Australian television fishing show

== See also ==
- Hook, Lion and Sinker, a 1950 Disney short cartoon featuring Donald Duck
- Hook, Line and Stinker, a 1958 Looney Tunes cartoon featuring Wile E. Coyote and the Road Runner
- "Hook, Line and Sink Her", a 1984 episode of TV series Fresh Fields
