= Clear the Air (Hong Kong) =

Voluntary organisation aiming at reducing air pollution in Hong Kong

- Type: Non-governmental organisation
- Industry: Environmentalism
- Founded: 10 December 1997
- Headquarters: Hong Kong
- Website: cleartheair.org.hk

Clear The Air (simplified Chinese: 争气行动; traditional Chinese: 爭氣行動) is a voluntary organisation aiming at reducing air pollution in Hong Kong. It was founded on 10 December 1997 as a Society under the Societies Ordinance (Cap 151). It is self-sustained and is supported by individual membership fees and member donations.

爭氣 means "fighting for air" and "living up to others' expectations". 行動 means "Action". So the Chinese name of Clear The Air means that people must "Act now – fight for better air" and also "Act now to meet others' expectations".

== Mission ==
Clear The Air is a voluntary organisation and a registered Charity. It hopes to raise the awareness of the Government and the legislative council on the worsening air quality in Hong Kong.

== Areas concerned ==
=== Vehicles and vessels ===
Clear the Air has stated that diesel engines are one of the main sources of roadside pollutants, they support the use of hybrid buses, and urges Government to turn all public light buses into Liquid Petroleum Gas (LPG) vehicles. Other areas concerned are smoky vehicles and vessels (e.g.ships, boats and ferries, where reporting of idling engines is also encouraged by the organisation.

It also recommends citizens to travel by mass transit systems like the Mass Transit Railway (MTR), which save energy and creates much less air pollution.

=== Traffic and roads ===
The organisation is in the position against building new roads and they believe that this would not neither reduce the traffic nor the number of cars. They are in favour of imposing a congestion charge. In 2005, when the Transport Department has stated that the traffic congestion on Northern Hong Kong Island should be solved by building a new bypass, Clear the Air maintained that a new bypass would not be the solution, where an Electronic Road Pricing (ERP) is the only solution to the congestion problem.

=== Power plants ===
The organisation is concerned about the pollution generated by the two electric companies Hong Kong Electric Holdings Ltd. and CLP Holdings Ltd. and claims that a tighter emission level should be applied. The three power plants in Hong Kong burn coal. Exxon Mobil is the major shareholder in the CLP venture and mega tycoon Li Ka Shing owns HK Electric. The companies sell a percentage of their output power over the border to Guangdong.

According to the data recorded by The Environmental Protection Department in 2004, the three power plants account for the emission of the major pollutants in Hong Kong. The emission and accumulation of respirable suspended particulates are the major pollution threats in Hong Kong. High concentration of pollutants leads to the formation of smog and haze and triggers health hazards, especially respiratory illnesses like asthma.

Their chairman has once described "Hongkong Electric as a heavy polluter" and demanded the company to achieve the 2010 emission reduction targets where otherwise action should be taken against it.

== See also ==
- Clean Air Network
