= USS Sequoia =

USS Sequoia has been the name of more than one United States Navy ship, and may refer to

- USS Sequoia (presidential yacht), a presidential yacht purchased in 1931 and commissioned 1933, remaining in service until 1977; currently privately owned
- USS Sequoia (1917), a lightship in commission from 1917 to 1919

== See also ==
- USCGC Sequoia (WLB-215)
- USS Sequoyah (SP-426)
