= Elm Park =

Coordinates: 51.5482°N 0.1987°E

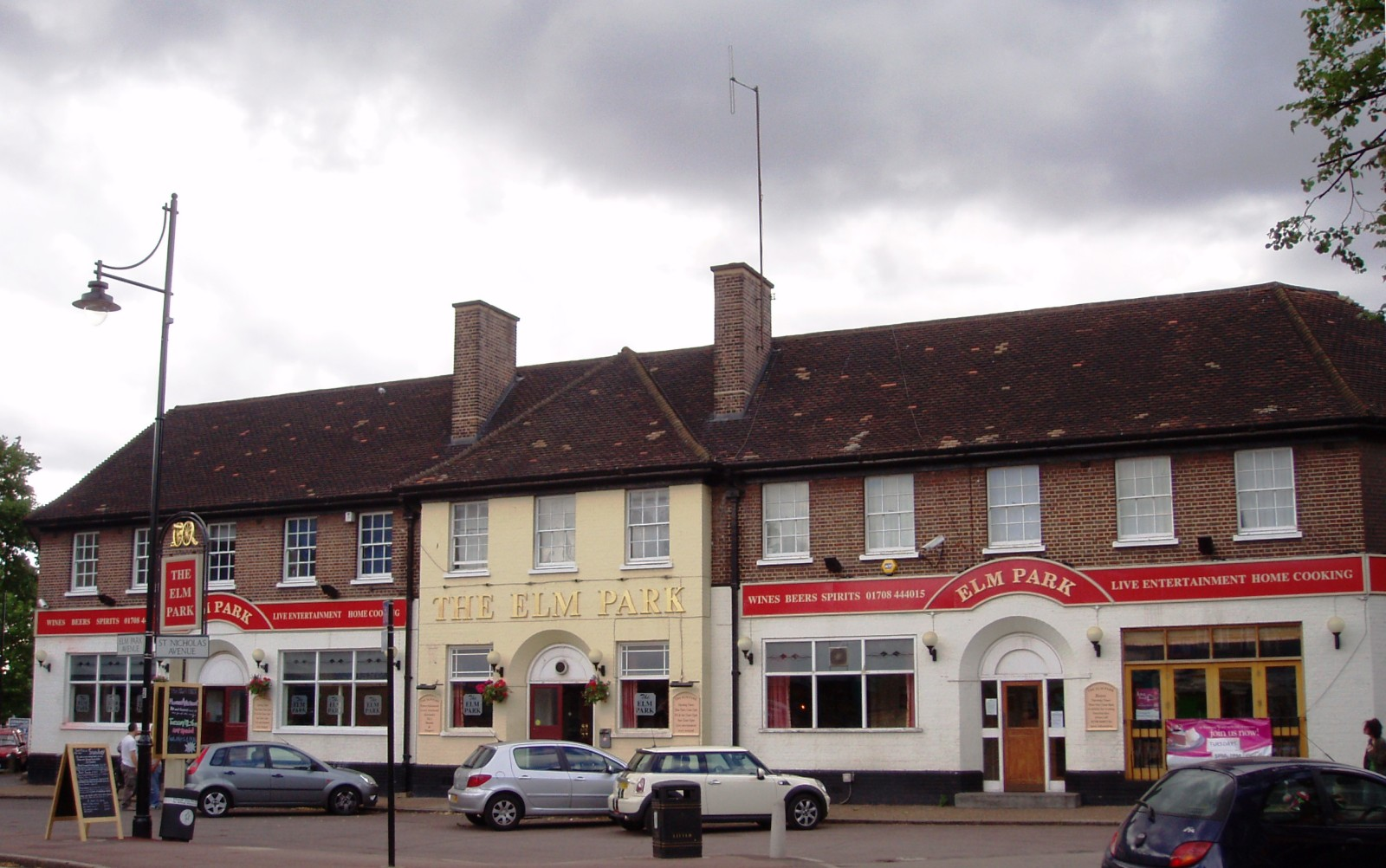
- Elm Park Hotel opened in 1938 as the only pub. Now fully removed.

- Location within Greater London
- Population: 12,466 (2011 Census. Ward)
- OS grid reference: TQ525855
  - Charing Cross: 14.3 mi (23.0 km) WSW
- London borough: Havering
- Ceremonial county: Greater London
- Region: London
- Country: England
- Sovereign state: United Kingdom
- Post town: HORNCHURCH
- Postcode district: RM12
- Dialling code: 01708
- Police: Metropolitan
- Fire: London
- Ambulance: London
- UK Parliament: Dagenham and Rainham
- London Assembly: Havering and Redbridge

Elm Park is a suburban planned community in East London and part of the London Borough of Havering. Located 14.3 miles (23.0 km) east-northeast of Charing Cross, it is identified as a district centre in the London Plan with several streets of shops and a priority for regeneration. Prior to the construction of the extensive Elm Park Garden City development in the 1930s it was a scattered settlement of farms in the south of the parish of Hornchurch. Elm Park has been connected to central London by the electrified District line service since 1935 and the planned development of the area formed part of the interwar private housing boom that was interrupted by World War II. After the war Elm Park expanded with social housing and it has formed part of Greater London since 1965.

== History ==
=== Toponymy ===
The place name Elm Park was devised in 1933. It was derived from Elm Farm, which is first recorded in 1777 and was known as Elms in 1883.

=== Local government ===
The area that became Elm Park formed part of the South End ward of the parish of Hornchurch; the large ancient parish occupied the same area as the royal manor and liberty of Havering. The Havering courts and Hornchurch vestry were the principal local government in the area. The liberty was abolished in 1892 and the parish vestry in 1894. Elected local government was incorporated by the Local Government Act 1894. Hornchurch civil parish was governed by Hornchurch Parish Council and formed part of the Romford Rural District, governed by Romford Rural District Council.

As the population was increasing, in 1926 the Hornchurch parish was removed from the rural district to become Hornchurch Urban District and the parish council became Hornchurch Urban District Council. The council, based in Langtons House from 1929, was the planning authority during the transition of Elm Park from farms to suburban development. The Hornchurch Urban District was abolished in 1965 and Elm Park became part of the London Borough of Havering in Greater London.

=== Urban development ===
Elm Park Garden City was a planned community by the developer Richard Costain and Sons Ltd., drawing on the ideas of the garden city movement. Costain purchased the land of Wyebridge, Elm and Uphavering farms for the development in 1933. Plans were announced for 7,000 houses on 600 acres (2.4 km^{2}) of land for private sale in May 1933, and were submitted to Hornchurch Urban District Council in June. Costain negotiated a higher density of development than was usually permitted. In return the council achieved some improvements, including provision of wider roads, a bridge over the railway line, and the donation of land for Harrow Lodge Park. Costain built an estate office at the corner of Coronation Drive and Maylands Avenue that later became occupied by a real estate solicitor.

Costain negotiated with the London, Midland and Scottish Railway to have a station built on the London to Southend railway that ran through the area and Elm Park Underground station, served by the District line of the London Underground, opened in 1935. The station and the Elm Park Garden City were officially opened by Hilton Young, Minister of Health in May 1935. Celebrations to mark the opening included a performance by the Dagenham Girl Pipers. The Assembly Hall, intended to be used as a recreation space and theatre, was given to the Elm Park Residents' Association, which was established in July 1935. The estate was marketed as "Elm Park Romford", with Romford approximately 2 miles (3.2 km) to the north. A frequent bus service was provided from 1939.

House building on the estate was halted by World War II. Because of the proximity of RAF Hornchurch the area was subject aerial bombing with some damage to the housing stock. After the war national housing policy had changed and Hornchurch Urban District Council deviated from the Costain plans to provide higher density social housing through compulsory purchase of the land, using loans from the Public Works Loan Board. By 1964 the council had created 1,146 council houses in Elm Park.

== Governance ==
Since the 2022 election, Elm Park is contained within the Elm Park ward of the London Borough of Havering. The ward elects three councillors to Havering London Borough Council. The majority of Elm Park is within Dagenham and Rainham UK Parliament constituency, but the area to the east of The Broadway and north of the railway is part of the Hornchurch and Upminster constituency. All of Elm Park is within the Havering and Redbridge London Assembly constituency.

== Geography ==
Open spaces in the area include Harrow Lodge Park, Hornchurch Country Park, Swallow Walk, Brettons Park and Eastbrookend Country Park of the Thames Chase forest. Nearest places are Dagenham, Rainham, and Romford.

== Demography ==
Elm Park ward compared (2001 Census)
Statistic	Elm Park	Havering	London	England
Ethnic group
White	11,398	213,421	5,103,203	44,679,36
Asian	215	4,088	866,693	2,248,289
Black	191	3,139	782,849	1,132,508
Mixed	148	2,298	226,111	643,373
Chinese/Other	96	1,302	193,235	435,300
Population
Total	12,048	224,248	7,172,091	49,138,831
Density(/hectare)	32.85	19.97	45.62	3.77
Households	4,950	91,722	3,015,997	20,451,427

The 2001 census shows the Elm Park ward has a population density higher than the borough of Havering, lower than all of London, but much higher than England as a whole. The population is predominately White, 92% within the White British classification, which is typical for the borough, and both higher than London and England. The mean and median average age of the population is 40, which is typical for the borough, about five years above London as a whole and slightly above the average for England.

== Economy ==
Elm Park is identified as a district centre in the London Plan and a priority for regeneration. Within Havering it is near to the major centre at Hornchurch and metropolitan centre at Romford. The compact retail area extends along the whole of The Broadway, which is flanked by the Station Parade and Tadworth Parade precincts, and continues along parts of Elm Park Avenue and Saint Nicholas Avenue. There are 196 units in the town centre. As of November 2012, 13.91% are convenience goods, 30.43% comparison goods, 42.61% services, and 13.04% vacant. These include a variety of independent and high street brand shops, including banks, clothes shops, pharmacies, bakers, greengrocers, fishmongers, florists, opticians, bicycle shops, butchers, hairdressers, grocery stores, off licence, dry cleaners, travel agents, and a post office. The unit sizes are fairly small, with a Tesco Express and The Co-operative Food forming some of the larger stores. There is a library which has recently been rebuilt. There are a number of takeaways, cafes and restaurants.

== Transport ==
Elm Park is served by Elm Park Underground station and has London Bus services to nearby Romford, Rainham and Hornchurch town centre. Regeneration linked to the Thames Gateway project has been mooted and recent changes such as the installation of new street lighting have been made. The East London Transit includes an option to serve the area.

Elm Park was the site of a derailment of a British Rail commuter service on 29 March 1965 resulting in two deaths and 15 people being injured: an act of vandalism by unknown persons (placing an obstruction on the line) derailed a London Fenchurch St. to Shoeburyness passenger train travelling at 70 m.p.h.

== Culture and community ==
Regeneration in the area is led by Havering London Borough Council and the Elm Park Regeneration Partnership. Elm Park is served by several churches - the Elm Park Baptist Church, St Albans Catholic Church, and St. Nicholas Church of England. It is also home to Arise Metropolitan Assembly which meets at the annex of the Elm Park Community Assembly Hall on Eyhurst/St.Nicholas Avenue, Christ Life Church and Eagles Christian Connections. It is also in Elm Park that the London Metropolitan Assembly convened by Apostle George Akalonu meets each month to discuss issues of common interest to faith, civic and community leaders.

== See also ==
- List of people from Havering
- List of schools in Havering
