= Elm Park (ward) =

Electoral division in the London Borough of Havering

Coordinates: 51.54410°N 0.19479°E

- Electoral ward for the Havering London Borough Council
- Elm Park ward boundaries since 2022
- Borough: Havering
- County: Greater London
- Population: 16,646 (2021) (Note: 2021 Census data reported for 2022 ward boundaries)
- Electorate: 12,084 (2022)
- Major settlements: Elm Park and South Hornchurch
- Area: 4.185 square kilometres (1.616 sq mi)

Current electoral ward
- Created: 1965
- Number of members: 3
- Councillors: Barry Mugglestone; Stephanie Nunn; Kimberley Gould
- GSS code: E05013969 (2022–present)

Elm Park is an electoral ward in the London Borough of Havering. The ward has existed since the creation of the borough on 1 April 1965 and was first used in the 1964 elections. It returns councillors to Havering London Borough Council.

== List of councillors ==
The ward has been represented by three councillors since the first election.

Term	Councillor	Party
1964–1968	L. Carroll	Labour
1964–1968	M. Hurley	Labour
1964–1968	Stanley Heath-Coleman	Labour
1968–1971	G. Bunch	Conservative
1968–1971	B. Casey	Conservative
1968–1971	N. Noyes	Conservative
1971–1978	D. Burn	Labour
1971–1978; 1990–2002	Jack Hoepelman	Labour
1971–1978; 1986–1990	George Saunders	Labour
1978–1986	Joan Arthur	Conservative
1978–1982	Margaret Ashby	Conservative
1978–1986	Leslie Reilly	Conservative
1982–1986	Ronald Woods	Conservative
1986–1990	Alan Williams	Labour
1986–1994	Michael Lucas	Labour
1990–1998	Howard Moss	Labour
1994–1998	Eric Harris	Labour
1998–2006	Ray Harris	Labour
1998–2006	Janet Davis	Labour
2002–2006	Graham Carr	Labour
2006–2010	David Grantham	Conservative
2006–2014	Roger Evans	Conservative
2006–2014	Barry Oddy	Conservative
2010–2014	Malcolm Brace	Conservative
2014–present	Barry Mugglestone	Residents
2014–present	Stephanie Nunn	Residents
2014–2018; 2022–present	Julie Wilkes	Residents
2018–2022	Sally Miller (Note: Sally Miller changed parties in 2019.)	Residents
2018–2022	Sally Miller	Conservative

== Summary ==
Councillors elected by party at each general borough election.

- Labour
- Conservative
- Residents

== Havering council elections since 2022 ==
There was a revision of ward boundaries in Havering in 2022.

=== 2026 election ===
The election took place on 7 May 2026.

2026 Havering London Borough Council election: Elm Park (3)
Party	Candidate	Votes	%	±%
Havering Residents Association	Barry Mugglestone	2,367		
Havering Residents Association	Stephanie Nunn	2,244		
Havering Residents Association	Kimberley Gould	2,080		
Reform	Wayne Morphew	2,067		
Reform	Joseph Biju	1,868		
Reform	Ash Bhardwaj	1,841		
Green	Kim Arrowsmith	704		
Green	Sami Rahman	563		
Labour	Sidra Bhatti	503		
Labour	Julia Pearman	469		
Labour	Naz Islam	456		
Green	Gheorghe Zugravu	454		
Conservative	Chucks Echedom	405		
Conservative	Bharathi Subramani	355		
Conservative	Matej Travnicek	314		
Liberal Democrats	Graham Potter	110		
Turnout			47.5	
Havering Residents Association hold		Swing		
Havering Residents Association hold		Swing		
Havering Residents Association hold		Swing		

=== 2022 election ===
The election took place on 5 May 2022.

2022 Havering London Borough Council election: Elm Park (3)
Party	Candidate	Votes	%	±%
Residents	Barry Mugglestone	2,971	70.7	
Residents	Stephanie Nunn	2,934	69.8	
Residents	Julie Wilkes	2,827	67.2	
Labour	Janet Davis	769	18.3	
Labour	Graham Carr	709	16.9	
Labour	Michael Davis	616	14.7	
Conservative	Valerie Best	608	14.5	
Conservative	Azza Azharuddin	474	11.3	
Conservative	Matej Travnicek	443	10.5	
Green	Gerald Haines	263	6.3	
Turnout			35.51	
Majority		2,058	48.9	
Residents win (new boundaries)				
Residents win (new boundaries)				
Residents win (new boundaries)				

== 2002–2022 Havering council elections ==
Elm Park ward boundaries from 2002 to 2022

There was a revision of ward boundaries in Havering in 2002.

=== 2018 election ===
The election took place on 3 May 2018.

2018 Havering London Borough Council election: Elm Park (3)
Party	Candidate	Votes	%	±%
Residents	Barry Mugglestone	2,160	57.6	
Residents	Stephanie Nunn	2,079	55.4	
Residents	Sally Miller	2,012	53.6	
Labour	Simon Darvill	776	20.7	
Conservative	Alfie Cooper	756	20.1	
Labour	Carol Palmer	732	19.5	
Conservative	Barry Oddy	648	17.3	
Labour	Umair Saeed	604	16.1	
Conservative	Rebecca Oddy	549	14.6	
UKIP	Philip Martin	281	7.5	
Green	Gerald Haines	149	4.0	
Liberal Democrats	Shane Foster	78	2.1	
Turnout			37.52%	
Majority		1,236		
Residents hold		Swing		
Residents hold		Swing		
Residents hold		Swing		

=== 2014 election ===
The election took place on 22 May 2014.

2014 Havering London Borough Council election: Elm Park (3)
Party	Candidate	Votes	%	±%
Residents	Barry Mugglestone	1,691		
Residents	Stephanie Nunn	1,598		
Residents	Julie Wilkes	1,432		
UKIP	Craig Litwin	1,359		
Labour	Kim Arrowsmith	805		
Conservative	Rebbecca Bennett	781		
Labour	Graham Carr	731		
Labour	Ian James	634		
Conservative	Barry Oddy	609		
Conservative	Henry Tebbutt	494		
Ind. Residents	Graham Crouch	388		
Ind. Residents	James Green	348		
Ind. Residents	Areekul Bunprakob	344		
Green	Gerald Haines	215		
Liberal Democrats	Andrew Willmer	80		
Europeans Party	Denisse-Oana Radoi	36		
Turnout			44	
Residents gain from Conservative		Swing		
Residents gain from Conservative		Swing		
Residents gain from Conservative		Swing		

=== 2010 election ===
The election on 6 May 2010 took place on the same day as the United Kingdom general election.

2010 Havering London Borough Council election: Elm Park (3)
Party	Candidate	Votes	%	±%
Conservative	Malcolm Brace	2,375		
Conservative	Barry Oddy	2,272		
Conservative	Roger Evans	2,213		
Labour	Graham Carr	1,949		
Labour	Ian James	1,699		
Labour	Susan Jiggens	1,639		
BNP	Peter Clover	977		
BNP	Anthony Easton	861		
Residents	Ronald Shipton	761		
BNP	Kenneth Seager	739		
UKIP	Craig Litwin	724		
Residents	Brian Long	667		
Residents	Terence Matthews	597		
National Liberal	Graham Littlechild	291		
National Liberal	Madelaine Marsden	250		
Green	Amanda Haines	232		
Green	Gerald Haines	203		
Turnout				
Conservative hold		Swing		
Conservative hold		Swing		
Conservative hold		Swing		

=== 2006 election ===
The election took place on 4 May 2006.

2006 Havering London Borough Council election: Elm Park (3)
Party	Candidate	Votes	%	±%
Conservative	David Grantham	1,448	37.8	
Conservative	Roger Evans	1,421		
Conservative	Barry Oddy	1,420		
National Liberal	Joyce Pammen	989	25.8	
Labour	Graham Carr	957	25.0	
National Liberal	Graham Williamson	954		
Labour	Ray Harris	946		
Labour	Janet Davis	938		
National Liberal	Keith Roberts	857		
Green	Gerald Haines	440	11.5	
Turnout			39.9	
Conservative gain from Labour		Swing		
Conservative gain from Labour		Swing		
Conservative gain from Labour		Swing		

=== 2002 election ===
The election took place on 2 May 2002. As an experiment, it was a postal voting election, with the option to hand the papers in on election day.

2002 Havering London Borough Council election: Elm Park (3)
Party	Candidate	Votes	%	±%
Labour	Janet Davis	1,861		
Labour	Graham Carr	1,851		
Labour	Ray Harris	1,824		
Conservative	Paul Hales	1,530		
Conservative	Stanley Elton	1,488		
Third Way	Graham Williamson	1,309		
Conservative	Michael Darby	1,300		
Turnout				
Labour win (new boundaries)				
Labour win (new boundaries)				
Labour win (new boundaries)				

== 1978–2002 Havering council elections ==
Elm Park ward boundaries from 1978 to 2002

There was a revision of ward boundaries in Havering in 1978.

=== 1998 election ===
The election on 7 May 1998 took place on the same day as the 1998 Greater London Authority referendum.

1998 Havering London Borough Council election: Elm Park (3)
Party	Candidate	Votes	%	±%
Labour	Ray Harris	1,640		
Labour	Jack Hoepelman	1,638		
Labour	Janet Davis	1,592		
Conservative	Ronald Clifford	1,143		
Conservative	Norman Forster	1,054		
Conservative	David Lel	896		
Third Way	Graham Williamson	578		
Turnout				
Labour hold		Swing		
Labour hold		Swing		
Labour hold		Swing		

=== 1994 election ===
The election took place on 5 May 1994.

1994 Havering London Borough Council election: Elm Park (3)
Party	Candidate	Votes	%	±%
Labour	Jack Hoepelman	2,260	47.52	▼3.41
Labour	Eric Harris	2,198		
Labour	Howard Moss	2,056		
Conservative	Lorraine Regan	1,144	23.37	▼6.41
Conservative	Derrick Weaver	1,047		
Conservative	David Lel	1,013		
Third Way	Graham Williamson	782	17.12	New
Liberal Democrats	Stephen Cooper	564	11.99	New
Liberal Democrats	Kathleen Cooper	549		
Liberal Democrats	Bernedette Oddy	530		
Registered electors		8,959		▼137
Turnout		4,407	49.19	▼2.48
Rejected ballots		3	0.07	▼0.36
Labour hold				
Labour hold				
Labour hold				

=== 1990 election ===
The election took place on 3 May 1990.

1990 Havering London Borough Council election: Elm Park (3)
Party	Candidate	Votes	%	±%
Labour	Jack Hoepelman	2,592	50.93	
Labour	Michael Lucas	2,588		
Labour	Howard Moss	2,348		
Conservative	Derrick Weaver	1,504	29.78	
Conservative	Patricia Field	1,469		
Conservative	Ronald Woods	1,429		
Independent	Graham Williamson	950	19.29	
Registered electors		9,096		
Turnout		4,700	51.67	
Rejected ballots		20	0.43	
Labour hold		Swing		
Labour hold		Swing		
Labour hold		Swing		

=== 1986 election ===
The election took place on 8 May 1986.

1986 Havering London Borough Council election: Elm Park (3)
Party	Candidate	Votes	%	±%
Labour	Alan Williams	2,068		
Labour	George Saunders	1,911		
Labour	Michael Lucas	1,818		
Conservative	Joan Arthur	1,415		
Conservative	Derrick Weaver	1,338		
Conservative	Ronald Woods	1,283		
Alliance	Michael Norris	764		
Alliance	Linda Powell	700		
Alliance	John Smith	682		
Residents	Aby Kite	360		
National Front	Graham Williamson	281		
Residents	John Newmeir	242		
Green	Diana Marshall	99		
Turnout				
Labour gain from Conservative		Swing		
Labour gain from Conservative		Swing		
Labour gain from Conservative		Swing		

=== 1982 election ===
The election took place on 6 May 1982.

1982 Havering London Borough Council election: Elm Park
Party	Candidate	Votes	%	±%
Conservative	Joan Arthur	1,678		
Conservative	Leslie Reilly	1,620		
Conservative	Ronald Woods	1,608		
Labour	George Saunders	1,357		
Labour	Sidney Jack	1,274		
Labour	Robert Kirchner	1,257		
Alliance	Winifred Clarke	1,151		
Alliance	Brian McCarthy	1,119		
Alliance	Cyril Wilkinson	1.072		
Turnout				
Conservative hold		Swing		
Conservative hold		Swing		
Conservative hold		Swing		

=== 1978 election ===
The election took place on 4 May 1978.

1978 Havering London Borough Council election: Elm Park (3)
Party	Candidate	Votes	%	±%
Conservative	Joan Arthur	1,894		
Conservative	Margaret Ashby	1,881		
Conservative	Leslie Reilly	1,852		
Labour	George Saunders	1,806		
Labour	David Burn	1,779		
Labour	Jack Hoepelman	1,761		
Liberal	Mark Long	204		
Liberal	Thomas Rimmer	202		
Liberal	Keith Penfold	193		
National Front	Robert Baldwin	184		
National Front	Alfred Harris	179		
National Front	Alan Newell	154		
Turnout				
Conservative win (new boundaries)				
Conservative win (new boundaries)				
Conservative win (new boundaries)				

== 1964–1978 Havering council elections ==
External image
- Map showing Elm Pak ward boundaries from 1965 to 1978

=== 1974 election ===
The election took place on 2 May 1974.

1974 Havering London Borough Council election: Elm Park (3)
Party	Candidate	Votes	%	±%
Labour	George Saunders	1,531		
Labour	J. Hoepelman	1,511		
Labour	D. Burn	1,497		
Conservative	J. Arthur	1,060		
Conservative	K. Barlow	1,044		
Conservative	T. Robinson	975		
Residents	C. Cox	827		
Residents	E. Cunnew	734		
Residents	G. Ellis	718		
Liberal	E. Blythe	327		
Liberal	I. Kendall	316		
Liberal	S. Golledge	277		
Turnout				
Labour hold		Swing		
Labour hold		Swing		
Labour hold		Swing		

=== 1971 election ===
The election took place on 13 May 1971.

1971 Havering London Borough Council election: Elm Park (3)
Party	Candidate	Votes	%	±%
Labour	D. Burn	2,529		
Labour	J. Hoepelman	2,503		
Labour	George Saunders	2,488		
Conservative	M. Noyes	926		
Conservative	D. Owen	895		
Conservative	D. Falconer	876		
Ind. Ratepayers	D. Cox	814		
Ind. Ratepayers	E. Cunnew	715		
Ind. Ratepayers	G. Ellis	707		
Turnout				
Labour gain from Conservative		Swing		
Labour gain from Conservative		Swing		
Labour gain from Conservative		Swing		

=== 1968 election ===
The election took place on 9 May 1968.

1968 Havering London Borough Council election: Elm Park (3)
Party	Candidate	Votes	%	±%
Conservative	G. Bunch	1,842		
Conservative	B. Casey	1,811		
Conservative	N. Noyes	1,804		
Labour	J. Hoepelman	1,244		
Labour	Stanley Heath-Coleman	1,240		
Labour	G. Rowlands	1,189		
Liberal	I. Draper	322		
Liberal	S. Golledge	300		
Liberal	R. Barwick	290		
Communist	V. Faversham	161		
Turnout				
Conservative gain from Labour		Swing		
Conservative gain from Labour		Swing		
Conservative gain from Labour		Swing		

=== 1964 election ===
The election took place on 7 May 1964.

1964 Havering London Borough Council election: Elm Park (3)
Party	Candidate	Votes	%	±%
Labour	L. Carroll	2,355		
Labour	M. Hurley	2,349		
Labour	Stanley Heath-Coleman	2,346		
Liberal	G. Hogan	708		
Liberal	G. Horey	676		
Liberal	L. Blows	626		
Conservative	W. Harris	559		
Turnout		3,477	40.0	
Labour win (new seat)				
Labour win (new seat)				
Labour win (new seat)				
