= Act Now (campaign group) =

Organization

ACT NOW
- Founded: by Tim Martin
- Type: Non-profit; NGO
- Services: Protecting human rights
- Key people: Tim Martin
- Website: www.act-now.info/Site1/Home.html

ACT NOW is a human rights campaign group founded by former British humanitarian aid workers from Sri Lanka against human rights abuses towards Tamil people.

== History ==
ACT NOW campaigned for a ceasefire against Tamil internment and later led an international boycott campaign until in Sri Lanka to end human rights abuses against Tamil people. It is headed by director Tim Martin a former Aid worker and assistant director Sockalingam Yogalingam. It also raises and sends aid to Tamils in Sri Lanka

The campaign oversaw the launch of the Mercy Mission to Vanni Aid ship and took part in the 2009 Tamil protests. ACT NOW has received the support of 55 British MPs and Members of the European Parliament. Public figures including Bob Geldof, Joanna Lumley, Brian May, M.I.A., Massive Attack, Sian Evans, Chris Steel, Jasmine Guinness, and Jade Parfitt have supported ACT NOW's campaign for Tamil victims.
