= Sequoyah High School (Claremore, Oklahoma) =

Coordinates: 36.375083°N 95.561085°W

- 16401 South 4180 Road; Claremore, Oklahoma 74017; United States

Information
- Established: 1908
- Authority: OSDE
- Superintendent: Terry Saul
- Principal: Chris Osburn
- Teaching staff: 26.14 (FTE)
- Enrollment: 379 (2023-2024)
- Student to teacher ratio: 14.50
- Colors: Blue and White
- Athletics conference: 3A
- Sports: Football, baseball, softball, track & field, soccer, basketball
- Mascot: Eagle
- Rivals: Inola, Verdigris, Berryhill
- Website: http://www.sequoyaheagles.net

Sequoyah High School is a public high school founded in 1908 located in Claremore, Oklahoma. The school colors are blue and white, and the mascot is an eagle.

== History ==
In 1908, the first graduating class left a two-story schoolhouse that was located on the current site. In 1936 an indoor gymnasium and high school building were added.

In 1957 the gym and high school burned to the ground but were rebuilt by 1959. Another fire destroyed the elementary building in 1975. A new elementary school was built.

The next 15 years saw a new middle school, football program, band program, track, and the Olan Graham field house that is still used today.

Every five years patrons have supported bond issues and added land, buildings, and programs.

In 2006, the Eagles won the 2006 State Football Championship with a record of 14–0.

== Notable alumni ==
- Levy Adcock, American football player
- Tim Martin, American football player
