= List of Ulster-related topics =

The territorial extent covered by the term Ulster may vary, reflecting the prevalent deep political and cultural divisions.

- The province of Ulster, one of the historic four provinces on the island of Ireland – comprising nine counties, six in Northern Ireland and three in the Republic of Ireland.
- Northern Ireland is sometimes referred to as Ulster, particularly by the unionist community, in this sense comprising the six UK-ruled counties only.

Political and paramilitary organisations, parties and movements having "Ulster" as part of their name are almost invariably on the Unionist side; military and police units having such names are often accused of a pro-Unionist bias. That is, however, not necessarily the case with names in other spheres including "Ulster". For example, Ulster sports associations and teams often form part of an all-Ireland structure and thus, while not overtly political, are favourably regarded by Irish Nationalists.

== Flags ==
- The divergent meanings of "Ulster" are reflected in divergent flags:
  - The Flag of Ulster which represents the whole of the historic province of Ulster
  - The Ulster Banner, used from 1953 to 1972 as the banner of the former Government of Northern Ireland. Today it is still used by some Northern Ireland sports teams.

== Linguistics ==
- Ulster Irish – the variety of the Irish language spoken in the province of Ulster.
- Ulster Scots, the variety of Scots spoken in parts of the province of Ulster.
- Mid Ulster English – the dialect of most people in the province of Ulster, including those in the two main cities.

== Sociological terms ==
- Ulster-Scots, an ethnic group descended from mainly Lowland Scots who settled in the province of Ulster.
  - Ulster Scots eXperience – band of musicians who perform music from the Ulster-Scots tradition
  - Ulster-Scots Folk Orchestra
  - Ulster-Scots Agency (Tha Boord o Ulstèr-Scotch), cross-border body promoting this dialect and its attendant culture.
    - The Ulster-Scot – publication of the above
- Ulsterman/Ulsterwoman – in principle referring to any inhabitant of Ulster, in practice mainly used by the Unionist community.

== Medieval history ==
- The Ulster Cycle – one of the four great cycles of Irish mythology, a series of legends surrounding the Red Branch Knights.
- The Annals of Ulster (Irish: Annála Uladh) – a chronicle of medieval Ireland.
- Red Hand of Ulster – symbol derived from Medieval history/myth and prominent in flags and coats of arms.
- Kings of Ulster
- Earl of Ulster – title created several times, since 1205, in the Peerages of Ireland and the United Kingdom.
- Ulster King of Arms – dealing with heraldic issues in the province, an office established in 1552 by King Edward VI.

== 17th-century history ==
- The Plantation of Ulster (Irish: Plandáil Uladh) – an early 17th-century process of colonisation in the province of Ulster in the reign of James I of England.

== Early 20th century politics, military, police and paramilitary ==
- Ulster Covenant – 1912 mass petition against the Home Rule Bill
  - Ulster 1912 – a Kipling poem supporting that Covenant
- Ulster Volunteers – founded in 1912 to block Home Rule for Ireland
  - Ulster Volunteer Force (UVF) – later development of the above
- Ulster Division/36th (Ulster) Division – formed from UVF men and fought at France during World War I
  - Ulster Tower – war memorial at Thiepval, France, commemorating the above
- The Royal Ulster Rifles, name given to the former Royal Irish Rifles in the British Army in 1921, following the proclamation of the Irish Free State.
- Ulster Special Constabulary (USC), a reserve police force in Northern Ireland, formed in 1920 and disbanded in 1970.
- Ulster Defence Volunteers/Ulster Home Guard – recruited by the Government of Northern Ireland during World War II.

== Later 20th century/current politics, military, police and paramilitary ==
- Ulster loyalism – a militant Unionist ideology held mostly by Protestants in Northern Ireland,
- Ulster Volunteer Force (UVF) – paramilitary loyalist group founded in 1966 and claiming the heritage of the earlier UVF
- Ulster Defence Association – another loyalist paramilitary group
  - Ulster Democratic Party (UDP)/Ulster Loyalist Democratic Party/ New Ulster Political Research Group – political parties and groupings at different times linked to the above.
  - Ulster Young Militants youth of the above
- Ulster Defence Regiment – formed in 1970 to replace the USC (Ulster Special Constabulary).
- Royal Ulster Constabulary – Northern Ireland police force often accused of pro-Unionist bias, merged into the Police Service of Northern Ireland following the Good Friday Agreement
- The Ulster Unionist Party (UUP), the more moderate of the two main unionist political parties in Northern Ireland
- Free Presbyterian Church of Ulster, founded in 1951 by the cleric and politician Ian Paisley
- Ulster nationalism – school of thought seeking the independence of Northern Ireland from the UK without becoming part of the Republic of Ireland.
  - Ulster Independence Movement – supporting the above.
  - The Ulster Third Way – supporting the above.
- Ulster Loyalist Central Co-ordinating Committee/Ulster Independence Party/Ulster Independence Association – political party and paramilitary organization in the 1970s and 1980s
- Ulster Resistance – 1980s paramilitary
- Ulster Clubs – Unionist organisation in the 1980s
  - Ulster Movement for Self-Determination – minor movement which emerged from the above
- Love Ulster – umbrella unionist victims' group
- British Army:
  - 152nd (Ulster) Transport Regiment – in the UK Territorial Army.
  - 107 (Ulster) Brigade
  - 40 (Ulster) Signal Regiment
  - 206 (Ulster) Battery, Royal Artillery
- Ulster Workers Council – a Loyalist workers' organisation
  - Ulster Workers' Council Strike – 1974 general strike by the above, against the proposed power-sharing Sunningdale Agreement
- Ulster Protestant Volunteers/Ulster Constitution Defence Committee – 1960s paramilitaries
- United Ulster Unionist Party – political party between 1975 and 1982.
- Ulster Army Council 1973 coordination of Loyalist paramilitaries
- Ulster Project – promoting reconciliation

== Sporting ==
- Ulster rugby union team
  - Ulster Schools Cup
  - Ulster Senior Cup
  - Ulster Junior Cup
  - Ulster Senior League
- Ulster GAA teams which compete in the Gaelic football and Hurling in the Railway cup
- Ulster Cup in Association football
  - Ulster Senior League (Association football)
- Ulster Senior Club Football Championship in Gaelic football
  - Ulster Senior Football Championship in Gaelic football
- Ulster Hockey Union
  - Ulster Senior League (Men's Hockey)
  - Ulster Shield – competition for ladies' hockey teams
- Ulster Grand Prix, motorcycle road race
- Ulster Senior Hurling Championship
  - Ulster Intermediate Club Hurling Championship

== Institutions and companies ==
- Culture of Ulster
- UTV, the ITV broadcaster for Northern Ireland (also widely watched in the Republic of Ireland), was known as Ulster Television from its inception on 31 October 1959 to 4 June 1993.
- Radio Ulster, a BBC radio station based in Belfast
  - Good Morning Ulster – program of the above
- The Ulster Hospital in Dundonald, known colloquially as "the Ulster"
- The University of Ulster
  - The University of Ulster at Coleraine
- The Ulster Museum
  - Ulster Folk and Transport Museum (Irish: Músaem Daonchultúir agus Iompair Uladh) in Cultra
  - Ulster American Folk Park (Irish: Daonpháirc Uladh-Mheiriceá), open-air museum in Castletown, County Tyrone
- The Ulster Bank
- The Ulster Orchestra
- Ulster Hall – Concert Hall
- Ulster Transport Authority
- Ulster Railways (disambiguation)
  - Ulster Railway – historical (19th Century company)
- Ulsterbus – public transport operator
- Ulster Teachers' Union
- Ulster Way – series of walking routes
- Ulster Canal – 19th Century, presently disused
- Ulster Herald – weekly newspaper in Omagh

== Constituencies ==
- Mid Ulster (Assembly constituency)
- Mid Ulster (UK Parliament constituency)
- Connacht–Ulster

== Place-names elsewhere, originally named in honour of the Irish province ==
- Ulster, Pennsylvania, United States of America
- Ulster County, New York, United States of America
- Ulster, New York, a town in Ulster County, NY
- Ulster Park, New York, United States of America
- New Ulster, the long-defunct name of the northern part of New Zealand
- Ulster and Delaware Railroad, in New York State
- Delaware and Ulster Railroad, in New York State
- New Ulster, a province in New Zealand (1841–53)

== Other ==
- An ulster (lower case) – a type of overcoat manufactured by the Ulster Overcoat Company in Belfast, which Sherlock Holmes is depicted as wearing
- An Ulster fry, a dish of various fried meats and breads popular throughout the province of Ulster
- Ulster, a Brazilian punk band from the 1980s.
