= List of political parties in Northern Ireland =

Although Northern Ireland is a part of the United Kingdom, it has a quite distinct party system from the rest of the country, as the Labour Party, Liberal Democrats, Green Party and Reform UK do not contest elections there (though Labour are affiliated with the Social Democratic and Labour Party, the Liberal Democrats have links with the Alliance Party and Reform had a 2024 electoral alliance with Traditional Unionist Voice). The Green Party of Northern Ireland is the affiliate of the Green Party of England and Wales and the Scottish Greens. The Conservative Party has received only limited support in recent elections. Party affiliation is generally based on religious and ethnic background.

The Northern Ireland Assembly is elected by single transferable vote and the composition of the Northern Ireland Executive is by power sharing determined by the D'Hondt system, among the members elected to the assembly. Northern Ireland also elects 18 MPs to the House of Commons, and there are elections to 11 local government districts.

Some parties, such as Sinn Féin and the Workers' Party, are organised on an all-Ireland basis. Others such as the Conservative Party are organised on an all-United Kingdom basis. There are many Northern Ireland-specific parties and these, on the whole, predominate.

The distinction between "unionist/loyalist", "nationalist/republican" and "other" is not always easy with some parties and individuals. Some have defined themselves less by their position on the "Border Question" than on other political issues.

For example, the former Republican Labour Party/Social Democratic and Labour Party MP Gerry Fitt's career suggests he was first and foremost a socialist rather than a nationalist and he eventually left the SDLP claiming it had drifted from its founding intentions. Similarly the Workers' Party has its roots in the republican Official IRA but nowadays is considered to be a non-violent socialist and nationalist party. Several parties strive to be avowedly non-sectarian and would not consider themselves to be either unionist or nationalist. The Northern Ireland Assembly requires MLAs to designate themselves either "Unionist", "Nationalist" or "Other". This is a designation that is particularly resented by those who designate as "Other", as they have no input on who becomes First or Deputy First Minister.

There are some who see the terms "Unionist"/"Loyalist" and "Nationalist"/"Republican" as being of more relevance to the community that the party seeks to represent rather than the position on the border question. Several of the "Other" parties strive to be non-sectarian but have a clear position on the border.

== Political parties with elected representation at a local, national, or UK level ==
=== Party details ===
Party	Founded	Political position	Ideology	Designation	Leader(s)	Local government	NI Assembly	House of Commons (NI Seats)	House of Lords
Sinn Féin	1905	Centre-left to left-wing	Irish republicanism; Democratic socialism; Left-wing nationalism	Nationalist	Michelle O'Neill (Note: Although Mary Lou McDonald is the party president, O’Neill serves as vice-president and as First Minister, functions as the party’s leader in Northern Ireland.)	144 / 462	27 / 90	7 / 18 (abstentionist)	—N/a
Democratic Unionist Party	1971	Right-wing	British nationalism; National conservatism; Right-wing populism; Euroscepticism	Unionist	Gavin Robinson	122 / 462	25 / 90	5 / 18	6 / 779
Alliance Party	1970	Centre to centre-left	Liberalism; Nonsectarianism; Pro-Europeanism	Other	Naomi Long	67 / 462	17 / 90	1 / 18	0 / 779 (Note: Lord Alderdice, leader of the Alliance from 1987–98, has sat in the Lords since 1996, taking the Liberal Democrat whip.)
Ulster Unionist Party	1905	Centre-right	British unionism; Conservatism	Unionist	Jon Burrows	51 / 462	8 / 90	1 / 18	2 / 779
Social Democratic and Labour Party	1970	Centre-left	Social democracy; Irish nationalism Pro-Europeanism	Nationalist	Claire Hanna	39 / 462	8 / 90	2 / 18	0 / 779 (Note: Margaret Ritchie, leader of the SDLP from 2010–11, has sat in the Lords since 2019 as a Labour peer, resigning from the SDLP to do so.)
Traditional Unionist Voice	2007	Right-wing	British unionism National conservatism Social conservatism Hard Euroscepticism	Unionist	Jim Allister	10 / 462	1 / 90	1 / 18	—N/a
People Before Profit	2005	Left-wing to far-left	Trotskyism; Socialism; Anti-capitalism; Irish reunification	Other (Note: In the Northern Ireland Assembly, the party's MLAs sign the register as "socialist" when asked if they are "unionist" or "nationalist", resulting in an official designation of "Other". However, People Before Profit is in favour of Irish reunification.)	Richard Boyd Barrett	2 / 462	1 / 90	—N/a	—N/a
Green Party NI	1985	Centre-left to left-wing	Green politics; Nonsectarianism; Pro-Europeanism	Other	Malachai O'Hara	5 / 462	—N/a	—N/a	—N/a
Progressive Unionist Party	1985	Centre-left to left-wing	British unionism; Ulster loyalism; Democratic socialism; Social democracy	Unionist	Russell Watton	1 / 462	—N/a	—N/a	—N/a
Aontú; English: Unity	2019	Fiscal: left-wing Social: right-wing	Irish republicanism Social conservatism	Nationalist	Peadar Tóibín	1 / 462	—N/a	—N/a	—N/a
NI Conservatives	1989	Centre-right to right-wing	British unionism; Conservatism; Economic liberalism	Unionist	Paul Leeman	—N/a	—N/a	—N/a	2 / 779
Labour Party	2003	Centre-left	Social democracy	Unionist	Erskine Holmes	—N/a	—N/a	—N/a	1 / 779
Liberal Democrats	1988	Centre to centre-left	Liberalism; Social liberalism; Nonsectarianism; Pro-Europeanism	Unionist	Stephen Glenn	—N/a	—N/a	—N/a	1 / 779

=== Party representation ===
Party	Representation (as of 12 September 2026)			
Party	UK Parliament		Assembly	Local councils
Party	House of Commons	House of Lords	Assembly	Local councils
Sinn Féin	7	0	27	144
Democratic Unionist Party	5	6	25	122
Alliance Party of Northern Ireland	1	0 (Note: Lord Alderdice, leader of the Alliance from 1987–98, has sat in the Lords since 1996, taking the Lib Dem whip.)	17	67
Ulster Unionist Party	1	2	9	54
Social Democratic and Labour Party	2	0 (Note: Margaret Ritchie, leader of the SDLP from 2010–11, has sat in the Lords since 2019, resigning from the party to do so.)	8	39
Traditional Unionist Voice	1	0	1	10
People Before Profit	0	0	1	2
Green Party Northern Ireland	0	0	0	5
Progressive Unionist Party	0	0	0	1
Aontú	0	0	0	1
Northern Ireland Conservatives	0	1	0	0
Labour Party in Northern Ireland	0	1	0	0
Northern Ireland Liberal Democrats	0	1	0	0

== Other registered parties ==
=== Unionist and loyalist ===
Party	Founded	Political position	Ideology	Leader(s)
Heritage Party	2020	Right-wing	Euroscepticism; British unionism British nationalism Social conservatism Right-wing populism	David Kurten

=== Nationalist and republican ===
Party	Founded	Political position	Ideology	Leader(s)	
Communist Party of Ireland; Irish: An Páirtí Cumannach na hÉireann	1933; 1970 (refoundation)	Far-left	Communism; Marxism-Leninism	—N/a	Jimmy Corcoran (General Secretary)
Fianna Fáil; English: Warriors of Fál or Soldiers of Destiny (Note: Since 2007, Fianna Fáil has been officially registered in Northern Ireland, but has not formally fielded any election candidates as of yet, despite members passing motions to at successive árdfheiseanna. Ógra Fianna Fáil launched cumainn (branches) at QUB and UU in the same year. From 2019 to 2022, it was in partnership with the SDLP.)	1926	Centre to centre-right	Irish republicanism Conservative liberalism Christian democracy		Micheál Martin
Irish Republican Socialist Party	1974	Far-left	Communism; Marxism-Leninism; Irish republicanism Dissident republicanism Hard euroscepticism	—N/a	Ard Chomhairle; English: National Executive
Republican Network for Unity	2007	Left-wing	Irish republicanism Dissident republicanism Socialism	—N/a	—N/a
Saoradh; English: Liberation	2016	Far-left	Irish republicanism Dissident republicanism Revolutionary socialism Hard Euroscepticism; Anti-imperialism	—N/a	Stephen Murney
Workers' Party; Irish: An Páirtí na nOibrithe	1970	Far-left	Communism; Marxism-Leninism; Irish republicanism	—N/a	Collective leadership

=== Others ===
Party	Founded	Political position	Ideology	Leader(s)		Notes
Cross-Community Labour Alternative	2015	Left-wing	Democratic socialism Anti-capitalism; Nonsectarianism	—N/a	Owen McCracken	—N/a
Socialist Party	1996	Left-wing to far-left	Democratic socialism Political radicalism Trotskyism; Euroscepticism	—N/a	Collective leadership	—N/a

== Unregistered parties ==
Candidates for unregistered parties may choose either to be listed as "Non-Party", or to leave the section blank on the ballot paper, in the same manner as independent candidates.

=== Nationalist and Republican ===
- 32 County Sovereignty Movement - Does not contest elections, operates as a pressure group
- Anti-Imperialist Action Ireland - Does not contest elections
- Fine Gael
- National Party
- Republican Sinn Féin (RSF)

=== Unionist ===
- Reform UK
- Advance UK

== Inactive parties ==
=== Unionist and loyalist ===
- Belfast Labour Party
- British Ulster Dominion Party
- Commonwealth Labour Party
- Independent Unionist Association
- Labour Unionist Party
- NI21
- UKIP Northern Ireland
- Northern Ireland Unionist Party - deregistered 2008
- Protestant Coalition
- Ulster Defence Party* (UDP)
- Protestant Unionist Party (evolved into the DUP)
- Ulster Constitution Party
- Ulster Democratic Party
- Ulster Loyalist Democratic Party
- Ulster Popular Unionist Party
- Ulster Progressive Unionist Association
- Ulster Protestant League
- Ulster Resistance
- Ulster Unionist Labour Association
- Unionist Party of Northern Ireland
- United Kingdom Unionist Party - deregistered 2008
- United Ulster Unionist Council
- United Ulster Unionist Party
- United Unionist Coalition (UUC)
- Vanguard Progressive Unionist Party
- Volunteer Political Party

=== Nationalist and Republican ===
- All Ireland Anti-Partition League
- Federation of Labour
- Fianna Uladh
- Irish Anti-Partition League
- Independent Socialist Party
- Irish Independence Party
- National Democratic Party
- National League of the North
- National Unity
- Nationalist Party
- Northern Council for Unity
- Official Sinn Féin (now Workers' Party)
- People's Democracy
- Red Republican Party
- Republican Congress
- Republican Labour Party
- Saor Éire
- Socialist Republican Party
- Unity

=== Others ===
- Commonwealth Labour Party
- Communist Party of Ireland (Marxist-Leninist)
- Communist Party of Northern Ireland
- Irish Labour Party (contests elections in the Republic)
- Labour coalition
- Labour Party of Northern Ireland
- Northern Ireland Labour Party
- Northern Ireland Women's Coalition
- Newtownabbey Labour Party
- Newtownabbey Ratepayers Association
- Natural Law Party
- Social Democratic Party - The post-1988 rump of the party stood in a Northern Ireland by-election in 1990; the party as a whole existed and was more prominent in Great Britain from 1981 to 1988 although the post-1990 rump group still exists.
- Ulster Independence Movement
- Ulster Liberal Party
- Ulster Movement for Self-Determination
- United Labour Party (Northern Ireland)
- Ulster Third Way - deregistered 2005
- Veritas - Dissolved June 2015
- Vote for Yourself Party - disbanded April 2009, de-registered 8 June 2009
- World Socialist Party (Ireland) - Dissolved in the 1990s

== Flowchart of all political parties in Northern Ireland ==
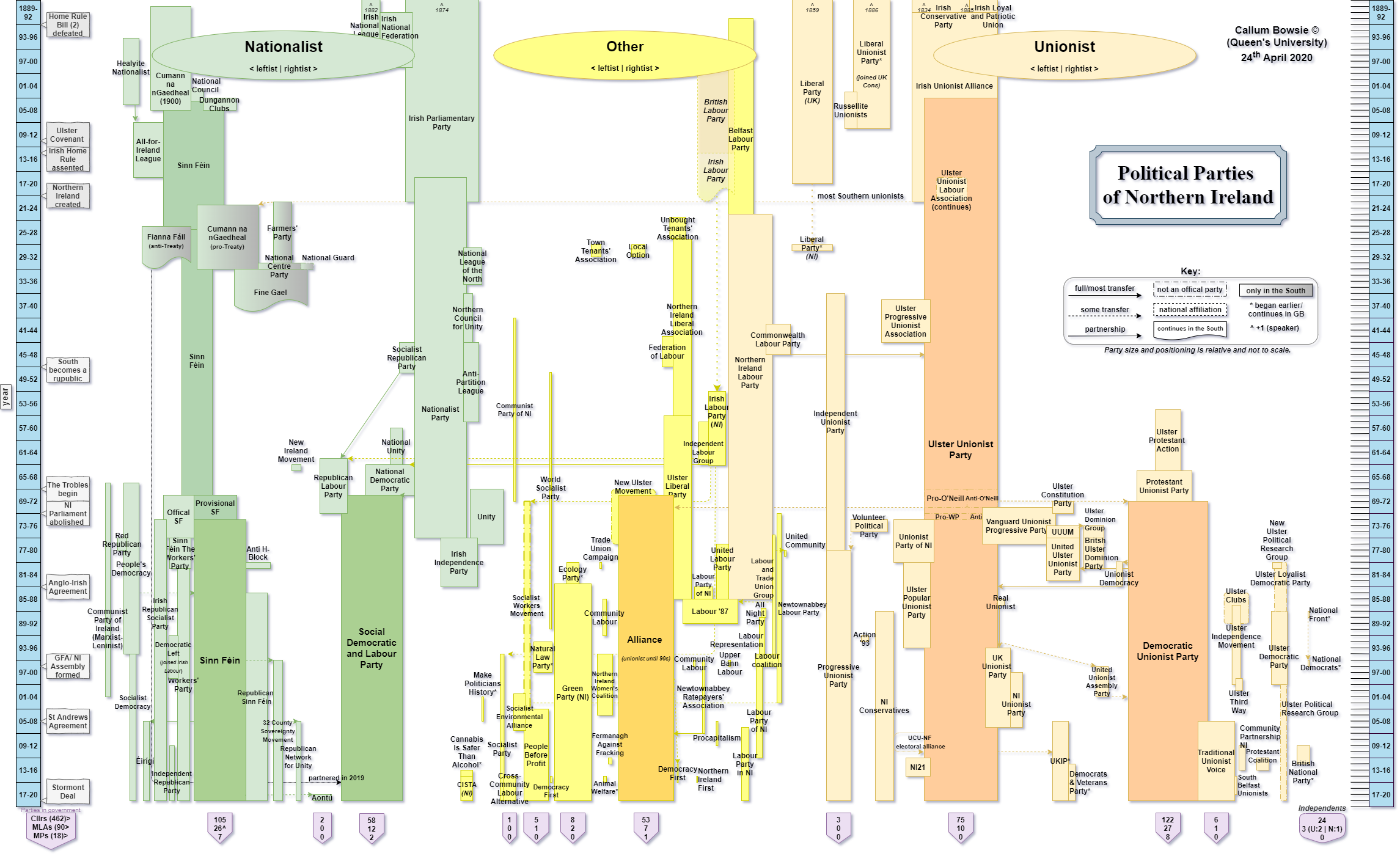
A flowchart illustrating all the political parties that have existed throughout the history of Northern Ireland and leading up to its formation.

== Party leaders ==
Party leaders serving 10 years or more are

Leader	Years	Party/Period	Constituency
Ian Paisley	42y	Protestant Unionist Party 1966–1971; Democratic Unionist Party 1971–2008	Bannside, North Antrim
Ruairí Ó Brádaigh	36y	Sinn Féin 1970–1983; Republican Sinn Féin 1986–2009	
Gerry Adams	35y	Sinn Féin 1983–2018	West Belfast, Louth
William Norton	28y	Irish Labour 1932–1960	
Tomás Mac Giolla	26y	Sinn Féin 1962–1970; Official Sinn Féin 1970–1977; Sinn Féin The Workers' Party 1977–1982; Workers' Party 1982–1988	
Hugh Smyth	23y	Progressive Unionist Party 1979–2002	
John Hume	22y	Social Democratic and Labour Party 1979–2001	Foyle
Albert McElroy	19y	Ulster Liberal Party 1956–1975 (?)	
Lord Craigavon	19y	Ulster Unionist Party 1921–1940	Down, North Down
John Redmond	18y	Irish Parliamentary Party 1900–1918	Waterford City
Lord Brookeborough	17y	Ulster Unionist Party 1946–1963	Lisnaskea
James Molyneaux	16y	Ulster Unionist Party 1979–1995	South Antrim, Lagan Valley
Joseph Devlin	16y	Nationalist Party 1918–1934	Belfast Falls, Fermanagh and Tyrone, Belfast Central
Gerry Fitt	15y	Republican Labour Party 1964–1970; Social Democratic and Labour Party 1970–1979	Belfast West, Belfast Dock
James Kilfedder	15y	Ulster Popular Unionist Party 1980–1995	North Down
David Ford	15y	Alliance Party 2001–2016	South Antrim
Margaret Buckley	13y	Sinn Féin 1937–1950	
Robert McCartney	13y	UK Unionist Party 1995–2008	North Down
James McSparran	13y	Nationalist Party 1945–1958	Mourne
Oliver Napier	12y	Alliance Party 1972–1984	Belfast East
Thomas Joseph Campbell	11y	Nationalist Party 1934–1945	Belfast Central
Sir Edward Carson	11y	Ulster Unionist Party 1910–1921	Dublin University, Belfast Duncairn
John Alderdice	11y	Alliance Party 1987–1998	Belfast East
David Trimble	10y	Ulster Unionist Party 1995–2005	Upper Bann

== See also ==
- Politics of Northern Ireland
- Lists of political parties
- Political make-up of local councils in Northern Ireland
- Reform UK–TUV alliance
- List of political parties in the Republic of Ireland
- List of political parties in the United Kingdom
