= Ken Kerr =

Ulster loyalist activist

Kenneth Kerr

Member of Derry City Council
- In office 17 May 1989 – 19 May 1993
- Preceded by: Annette Hamilton
- Succeeded by: Bill Irwin
- Constituency: Waterside

Personal details
- Born: Derry, Northern Ireland
- Party: Ulster Democratic Party (until 1994)
- Other political affiliations: Ulster Independence Movement (1996)

Kenneth Jason Kerr is a Northern Irish loyalist activist. He was a leading figure within the Ulster Defence Association (UDA) and its political wing, the Ulster Loyalist Democratic Party. He was also central to a series of allegations regarding collusion between the British security forces and loyalist paramilitaries.

== Ulster Defence Association ==
In his youth, Kerr served in the British Army before joining the UDA. He served as Brigadier of the UDA's "Londonderry and North Antrim Brigade", and as such was a member of the movement's Inner Council. In this role he succeeded Andy Robinson, who fled his position in 1986. Like South Belfast brigadier John McMichael, Kerr also became involved in the UDA's political arm, the Ulster Loyalist Democratic Party, and following the killing of McMichael in 1987, Kerr served for a time as chairman of the party. This role was soon filled on a more permanent basis by Ray Smallwoods.

== Ulster Democratic Party ==
In 1989, the Ulster Loyalist Democratic Party contested the local elections and, despite a very low-key campaign, Kerr was elected as their sole representative in Northern Ireland. He was elected to Derry City Council, representing the loyalist Waterside area. He lost the seat at the 1993 election. Kerr's win was however something of aberration as the success of the Ulster Democratic Party (UDP), as they became known in 1989, was otherwise limited to Belfast and its satellite towns of Lisburn and Newtownabbey.

In early 1992, Kerr was attacked by the Provisional IRA (IRA) although he escaped serious injury. In response, Kerr accused local Democratic Unionist Party (DUP) activist David Nicholl of conspiring with the republicans to have him killed after Nicholl had published information linking the UDP to the UDA. The link between the two groups would later be publicly acknowledged by the UDP. Later that same year, Kerr was profiled in an episode of the ITV current affairs programme This Week. During the programme Kerr stated that he was no longer a member of the UDA but remained a loyalist before denouncing the IRA as the "scum of the earth" and calling on the British government to seek them out and destroy them.

In 1993, Kerr travelled with UDP chairman Ray Smallwoods to South Africa where they held a meeting with representatives of the Inkatha Freedom Party. Kerr was close to Smallwoods and when the latter was killed in 1994, Kerr reacted angrily, stating "if I called for no retaliation, as sure as night turns to day, there is somebody who is going to retaliate and no matter what I say nothing will change that".

== Ulster Independence Movement ==
Kerr subsequently left the UDP and joined the Ulster nationalist Ulster Independence Movement. He was on their candidate list for the 1996 elections to the Northern Ireland Forum, and also stood in Foyle, but was not elected to the body (nor indeed were any members of the party).

== The Committee ==
According to Sean McPhilemy a series of loyalist killings carried out largely by Ulster Volunteer Force members Robin Jackson and Billy Wright and their underlings in the UVF Mid-Ulster Brigade were ordered by the Ulster Loyalist Central Co-ordinating Committee, a group he says was made up of a number of leading figures from Northern Irish society and public life. Kerr was, according to McPhilemy, a self declared member of this body although McPhilemy would later dismiss much of what Kerr said about his time on the committee as lies.

Kerr and McPhilemy met in April 1996 at the Waterfoot Hotel in Kerr's native Derry, where Kerr admitted his membership of the committee, although a follow-up meeting was abandoned after Kerr stated that a Royal Ulster Constabulary (RUC) spy was present in the bar. Kerr and his wife then spent a weekend with McPhilemy in Maidstone in August 1996. Kerr told McPhilemy that he had been a paid informer for British Military Intelligence for a number of years and that they had supplied a number of the names to be killed, with Kerr presenting them to the Committee at the behest of his paymasters. Kerr named fifteen Catholics murdered between 1989 and 1991, all of whom he claimed had been killed on the committee's orders. He also gave the names of around thirty supposed Committee members, all unknown to McPhilemy, and including twelve senior RUC officers. Kerr initially suggested that he was volunteering the information as he wanted out of his role as an informant but at a later date claimed to be dying of colon cancer and wanted to unburden himself before death.

In May 1997 Tim Laxton, acting on behalf of McPhilemy, paid Kerr £5,000 for a cassette tape that the UDA Brigadier claimed contained a recording of a meeting of the Committee in 1989. The tape, which was of poor quality and supposedly in code (a translation of which Kerr provided), was said by Kerr to contain the voices of RUC Assistant Chief Constable Trevor Forbes, "Chief Inspector Ezzard Boyd" and two unnamed businessmen discussing plans to murder Pat Finucane. Uncertain of the veracity of the tape, McPhilemy began to doubt it when he realised that the name and nickname given by Kerr for one of the businessmen were the same as those of a Northern Ireland footballer whilst after watching videos of Forbes speaking he realised that his voice resembled none of those on the tape. It subsequently came to light that Ezzard Boyd had in fact been a loyalist who served a prison sentence in the late 1980s rather than a leading RUC officer and as such McPhilemy discarded the tape as a clear hoax. McPhilemy would eventually claim that the tape had been a deliberate attempt to wreck the credibility of his book as, had he included it as genuine evidence, Kerr would have brought out the real, uniquely named, Ezzard Boyd and thus made the claims in the book look like an entire fraud. McPhilemy also rejected Kerr's claims to be a British agent and concluded that he had in fact been "the brains behind the paramilitary side of the Committee's assassination campaign".

David and Albert Prentice subsequently sued McPhilemy, his publisher Roberts Rinehart and his TV production company Box Production for $100 million over his claims that they were involved in the committee. McPhilemy settled out of court for $1 million and released a statement acknowledging that the Prentices had no involvement in loyalist activity. In a separate case however McPhilemy was awarded £145,000 in damages against The Sunday Times after they claimed that The Committee was a hoax.

Political offices
Preceded by John McMichael	Leader of the Ulster Democratic Party; 1987 - c.1990	Succeeded by Ray Smallwoods
