= Mayer Schiller =

American rabbi

Rabbi Mayer Schiller (born June 1951) is an American chasid based in Monsey, New York, who identifies himself as a member of Skver and Rachmastrivka groups, and is a spokesperson for the Skver community in New Square. Schiller also maintains active ties to the Modern Orthodox community. Prior to his retirement Schiller taught as a high school teacher at Mesivta Beth Shraga and Marsha Stern Talmudical Academy of Yeshiva University. He is a baal teshuva (a Jew from a secular background who begins practising Orthodox Judaism), having begun practicing Orthodoxy in the spring of 1964 at age 12.

== Political activity ==
Schiller is a nationalist who criticizes liberal notions of race and the bias against traditional religion in today's media and popular culture. He has been associated with various groups, including the Third Way (UK), the Ulster Third Way, and American Renaissance. However, Schiller has also advocated a universalist humanist morality and embrace of the Other, provided that is pursued without loss to group identity. He is involved with the group Toward Tradition, which seeks to advance co-operation between Orthodox Jews and conservative Christians, for example, on issues like abortion, marriage, family, religious schools, and religious freedom.

Schiller is also the author of two books, The Road Back: A Discovery of Judaism Without Embellishments and The (Guilty) Conscience of a Conservative (under the name Craig Schiller), along with a monograph in defense of Rabbi Samson Raphael Hirsch's Torah Im Derech Eretz philosophy, titled "And They Shall Judge the People With True Righteousness". His writings are collected on the site rabbimayerschiller.com

== Works ==
- Rabbi Mayer Schiller, "Piety, Banality, Scholarship, and Superficiality" Jewish Action (Fall 1982) p. 16-17. Vol. 43, No. 1
- — "Symposium: The Future of American Orthodoxy" Jewish Action (Fall 5759/1998) p. 56-59. Vol. 59, No. 1
- — "The New Judaism" American Council for Judaism Issues (Summer 1998) p. 5-12.
- — "A Symposium in Divided and Distinguished Worlds" Tradition Vol. 26 No. 2, (Winter 1992) pp. 5, 58-62
- — "Reflections on the Sixth Day War After Half a Century " Tradition Vol. 26 No. 4, (Summer 1992) p. 6, 15-19
- — "The Sea Change in Orthodox Judaism: A Symposium" Tradition Vol. 32 No. 4 (Summer 1998) p. 19, 101-105
- — "Hirschians and Kookians in America: Report on an Endangered Species" Jewish Action (Winter 5747/1986-1987) p. 9-15. Vol. 47, No. 1
- — "The Forgotten Humanism of Rabbi Samson Raphael Hirsch" Jewish Action (Summer 5759/1981) pp. 21–26. Vol.49, No. 3
- — "The Academic and/or Man of Faith" Jewish Action (Spring 1990) p. 28-32. Vol. 50, No. 2
- — "Fun and Relaxation Reexamined" Jewish Action (Spring 5751/1991) Vol. 51, No. 2
- — "Realities, Possibilities, and Dreams: Reaching Modern Orthodox Youth" Ten Da'at (Adar 5749) p. 23-26. Vol. 111, No. 2
- — "Torah Ummada and The Jewish Observer Critique: Towards a Clarification of the Issues" The Torah u-Madda Journal 6 (1995–1996) p. 58-90
- — "Exchange with Rabbi Shlomo Danziger" Jewish Action (Winter 5760/1999) pp. 30,32,81, Vol. 60, No. 2
- — "Are We Still a Holy Nation? An All-Embracing Kedushah" Jewish Action (Fall 5762/2001) pp. 32–34 Vol. 62, No.1
- — "Can the Death of Ideology Spell the Rebirth of Hasidism?" Jewish Action (Summer/Fall 1986) p. 48-51. Vol. 45, No. 3
- — "The Unique Village of New Square" Jewish Action (Spring 5752/1992) pp. 35–39. Vol. 52, No. 2
- — "A Portrait of Moshe 'Gabbai'" Jewish Action (Fall 5760/1999) p. 39-43. Vol. 60, No. 1
- — "A Personal God and the Rebbe Who Taught Him: Rabbi Aharon Roth (Reb Arele)" Great Minds of the Twentieth Century in Jewish Action (Fall 5757/1996) p. 38-41. Vol. 57, No. 1
- — "Separation: Is There an Alternative?" American Renaissance (February 1995) Vol. 6, No. 2
- — "First Toward Tradition Conference : The Arduous Calling of Religious Conservatives". October 6, 1994
- — "Second Toward Tradition Conference : Conservatism's Death and the West's Hope". September 11, 2000
- — "Third Toward Tradition Conference : The Politics of Kiddush Hashem" September 11, 2000
