= Ray Smallwoods =

British politician

Raymond Smallwoods (c. 1949 – 11 July 1994) was a Northern Ireland politician and sometime leader of the Ulster Democratic Party. A leading member of John McMichael's South Belfast Brigade of the Ulster Defence Association (UDA), Smallwoods later served as a leading adviser to the UDA's Inner Council. He was killed by the Provisional Irish Republican Army (IRA) outside his Lisburn home.

== Ulster Defence Association ==
Smallwoods was a native of Lisburn and, as such, was a member of the Ulster Defence Association's South Belfast brigade, which also covered the nearby town. In late 1979, John McMichael, a leading figure in the UDA and also a Lisburn native, set up a commando structure within the UDA and drew up a "shopping list" of leading targets for this group to kill. Amongst the names on the list killed were Irish Independence Party member John Turnley, Irish National Liberation Army (INLA) prisoners' representative Miriam Daly and INLA and Irish Republican Socialist Party activists Ronnie Bunting and Noel Lyttle. On 14 January 1981, Smallwoods, an associate of McMichael, was amongst those in attendance at a meeting above McMichael's pub in which it was decided that the next target would be former Irish republican politician Bernadette McAliskey. According to Sammy Duddy, Smallwoods was one of only nine men that McMichael used for these operations. Smallwoods and McMichael were close personally as well as professionally and both men and their families holidayed together on the Isle of Man.

On 16 January 1981, Smallwoods participated in an attack on the Coalisland home of Michael McAliskey and his wife Bernadette, in which both were shot multiple times and seriously wounded. At the time, their house was being watched by a unit of the 3rd Battalion, The Parachute Regiment, resulting in the attackers all being arrested after the shooting. As it subsequently transpired, Smallwoods had not fired any shots but had been the driver of the getaway car. UDA men Thomas Graham (38) and Andrew Watson (25) had been the gunmen. He was sentenced to fifteen years in prison for his involvement. Following the arrests of McMichael's commando team and the leaking of the list to the press by his rival Tommy Lyttle, the "shopping list" was abandoned.

== Inner Council ==
During his time in prison, Smallwoods, who was described by other inmates as a deep-thinking introvert who struggled with being apart from his family for so long, spent a long time contemplating the UDA's weaknesses and considering other strategies, including political ones. Following his release from prison in 1990, Smallwoods found the UDA to be greatly changed, with his ally McMichael dead and Andy Tyrie removed as leader and replaced by an Inner Council. Smallwoods was promptly attached to this body as an adviser and played a leading role in shaping UDA strategy over the next few years as a result. At the time, Smallwoods was still advocating continued armed struggle by the UDA, arguing that their role was to ensure that the British government did not agree to a united Ireland, and was advising in the Inner Council in favour of the UDA's ongoing bombing campaign. He also argued that the IRA's structure had changed to become subordinate to Sinn Féin and, as such, advocated a strategy of targeting Sinn Féin members, who were more vulnerable to assassination. Smallwoods' strategy was influenced by the "shopping list" idea of John McMichael. Amongst those to be killed as a result of this strategy were Sinn Féin activists Tommy Casey, Councillor Eddie Fullerton and Thomas Donaghy, as well as Robert Shaw, the father of an SF worker but not himself a member.

During early 1992, Smallwoods, and others close to him in the Inner Council, held a series of meetings with Presbyterian ministers Jack Weir and Godfrey Browne. At these meetings, facilitated by Reverend Roy Magee, a former member of the Ulster Vanguard and campaigner against the Anglo-Irish Agreement who had become a peace advocate, the ministers pressed Smallwoods to lead the Inner Council towards a ceasefire. The proposal was rejected by the Inner Council and Smallwoods ended the discussions in March after learning that Weir and Browne had also been negotiating with Sinn Féin, a fact that Smallwoods feared might lead to suggestions that he had been passing information to the IRA.

Nonetheless, Magee remained in regular contact with Smallwoods, whom he believed to be one of the main moderates on the Inner Council. Around 1993, Smallwoods, following prompting from Magee, opened communication with Alec Reid and Gerry Reynolds, two priests from the Roman Catholic Clonard Monastery on the Falls Road whom he used to open communications with republicans. Smallwoods intimated to them that the UDA was hoping to see peace and was preparing for a ceasefire. Father Reid had already built a relationship with Robert "Basher" Bates, one of the Shankill Butchers whose conversion to born-again Christianity had seen the two co-operate on ecumenical initiatives, but Smallwoods was the first active, high-ranking loyalist to hold regular dialogue with Catholic clergy. The Greysteel massacre of October 1993 almost led to the initiative breaking down as a disgusted Magee decided to break off contact with the UDA altogether but he was dissuaded by Smallwoods, who convinced him that there was a growing willingness to embrace peace on the Inner Council. Magee would later state that, despite his endorsement of a policy of targeting Sinn Féin members, Smallwoods proved to be an important voice for moderation on the Inner Council and a prime architect of the eventual loyalist ceasefire.

== Political involvement ==
As well as his role with the Inner Council, Smallwoods was also made the public spokesman for the Ulster Democratic Party (UDP) following his release from prison. He became party chairman in the early 1990s and around this time also became liaison officer for the UDA to the Combined Loyalist Military Command. During the early 1990s, Smallwoods was in regular contact with the Progressive Unionist Party's Gusty Spence and took part in the so-called "kitchen cabinets" held in Spence's home in which leading loyalist politicians and paramilitaries met to discuss possible strategies for peace.

Smallwoods was noted for his strong working class loyalist approach to Northern Irish politics, which was distinct from the more middle class unionism favoured by larger parties. It was also noted by both Ian S. Wood and an Observer journalist that Smallwoods sometimes struggled with his dual role as politician and paramilitary director, often beginning interviews by calling the UDA "them" before eventually switching to "us". Having come from a background in the UDA in the 1970s, Smallwoods was sympathetic to Ulster nationalism and, during his chairmanship, he placed the notion of an independent Northern Ireland at the heart of party policy. According to Gusty Spence, however, Ulster nationalism was a fallback position for Smallwoods, who also recognised the impracticalities of the idea, a plan that Spence had no truck with.

== Death ==
As UDP chair, Smallwoods became a prominent figure as the UDA moved towards a ceasefire and emerged as an articulate voice of loyalist politics. Smallwoods, however, was not to see these developments as he was killed by the IRA in Lisburn on 11 July 1994. The attack, which occurred in the garden of his house on Lisburn's Donard Drive, was witnessed by his wife Linda.

Smallwoods' killing was one of a series of attacks by the IRA during the middle of 1994 in which top loyalists and other opponents, such as Martin Cahill, were targeted before the movement went on ceasefire. Smallwoods' killing, as well as the killings of Joe Bratty and Raymond Elder twenty days later, were claimed at the time to be in revenge for the Loughinisland massacre. The attack was condemned by his Progressive Unionist colleague David Ervine as a "totally cynical exercise" given Smallwoods' work towards peace. For their part, the IRA stated that Smallwoods had actually been involved in directing UDA terror. For the UDA, Smallwoods was a double loss as he was both an important director of their campaign of violence and also, increasingly, a moderating influence, who was seeking to move the UDA away from violence. His funeral was held on 14 July, where Reynolds and Reid were amongst the mourners whilst his pallbearers included Democratic Unionist Party politicians Peter Robinson and Sammy Wilson.

The loyalists decided not to retaliate for Smallwoods' assassination and instead, on 15 July, released a statement that had been drafted by Smallwoods shortly before his murder in which the CLMC said it would go on ceasefire if the IRA did so. He was succeeded as leader of the UDP by Gary McMichael, the son of John McMichael.

== See also ==
- 1994 Shankill Road killings

Political offices
Preceded by Ken Kerr	Leader of the Ulster Democratic Party c.1990 – 1994	Succeeded by Gary McMichael
