= Downing Street Declaration =

Part of the Northern Ireland Peace Process

The Downing Street Declaration was a joint declaration issued on 15 December 1993 by the prime minister of the United Kingdom, John Major, and the Irish taoiseach (English: prime minister), Albert Reynolds, at the British prime minister's office in 10 Downing Street.

The declaration affirmed both the right of the people of Ireland to self-determination, and that Northern Ireland would be transferred to the Republic of Ireland from the United Kingdom only if a majority of its population was in favour of such a move. It also included, as part of the prospective of the so-called "Irish dimension", the principle of consent that the people of the island of Ireland had the exclusive right to solve the issues between North and South by mutual consent.

The latter statement, which later would become one of the points of the Good Friday Agreement, was key to produce a positive change of attitude by the republicans towards a negotiated settlement. The joint declaration also pledged the governments to seek a peaceful constitutional settlement, and promised that parties linked with paramilitaries (such as Sinn Féin) could take part in the talks, so long as they abandoned violence.

== Significance ==
The Downing Street Declaration demonstrated to republicans and loyalists that political differences can be "negotiated and resolved exclusively by peaceful political means". Contrary to the suggestion that an inclusive settlement "would compromise no position or principle", the history of the declaration had already shown that compromise on all sides was the indispensable foundation of the Northern Ireland peace process.

The declaration, after a meeting between Sinn Féin President Gerry Adams and American congressman Bruce Morrison, which was followed by a joint statement issued by Adams and John Hume, was considered sufficient by the Provisional Irish Republican Army to announce a ceasefire on 31 August 1994 which was then followed on 13 October by an announcement of a ceasefire from the Combined Loyalist Military Command. This ceasefire allowed Sinn Fein to be admitted to the "democratic process".

The Downing Street Declaration was significant because it addressed major ideological obstacles to peace in Northern Ireland, such as the right of the people of Ireland to self-determination and the principle of consent:

"The British Government agree that it is for the people of the island of Ireland alone, by agreement between the two parts respectively, to exercise their right of self-determination on the basis of consent, freely and concurrently given, North and South, to bring about a united Ireland, if that is their wish".

Indeed, the Declaration addressed the "boundary question" of who would be allowed to vote in a referendum, which it stated the people of the island of Ireland. Therefore, the idea of self-determination gave legitimacy to any constitutional decision taken by the people of the island of Ireland for the people of the island of Ireland. Subsequently, this meant that these issues were generally accepted by the time the Good Friday Agreement negotiations began, and did not significantly stall the 1998 peace agreement.

== The Origins and Negotiation of the Downing Street Declaration ==
=== Father Alec Reid ===
Although the final declaration was a triumph of diplomacy and negotiation between the governments of the Republic of Ireland and the United Kingdom, its origins are more complex, and can be traced to the work of the Redemptorist priest, Father Alec Reid. The idea of a joint declaration emerged from his attempts to create a pan-Nationalist front in the late 1980s by bringing John Hume's SDLP and members of Fianna Fáil into conversation with Gerry Adams and other Sinn Féin leaders. Reid argued that a declaration by the British government which recognised the right of the Irish people to self-determination would enable a Republican ceasefire and he called for an Irish Peace Conference to 'persuade' the British government to make such a declaration and to adopt a policy that would allow for the creation of a 'new, independent Ireland'.

=== Hume–Adams Talks ===
The exercise of self-determination and the role of the British government had been a key component of the Hume–Adams talks in 1988. In the 26-page record of their inter-party dialogue the term 'self-determination' appeared no fewer than 54 times. While Sinn Fein attributed the essence of the Irish problem to Britain's 'colonial interference', Hume argued that the British no longer had selfish interest in maintaining their presence in Ireland, and that the focus should instead be on resolving the divisions within Ireland itself over how self-determination was exercised, by persuading and obtaining the consent of the Unionist population for a unified Ireland, something the Sinn Féin delegation described as a 'Unionist veto'.

Hume's proposed solution that would enable a divided Ireland to exercise collective self-determination was dual referendums in both the North and the South, a concept that would feature not only in the Downing Street Declaration, but later in the Good Friday Agreement. These early ideas and discussions were refined through Reid's dialogue with Martin Mansergh whose commentary on Reid's proposals represents one of the earliest attempts to reconcile the 'inalienable right' of the Irish people to 'the exercise in common of self-determination without external intervention' with the practical need to seek the consent of 'both parts of Ireland'.

=== Early Drafts ===
Peter Brooke's Whitbread speech in November 1990 gave new impetus to the initiative. Brooke stated publicly, as recommended by Hume, that the 'British Government has no selfish strategic or economic interest in Northern Ireland', wording that would be incorporated into the final declaration. Perhaps buoyed by this initial success and its cautious welcome in Republican circles, in October 1991, Hume went on to draft what is generally accepted to be the first full version of the Joint Declaration, published in Mallie and McKittrick (1996).

Borrowing language from earlier Reid papers, the opening paragraphs lamented the 'tragedy and suffering' caused by the 'legacy of history' and past failures to resolve the conflict, and committed the two governments to cooperation in the interests of the 'future welfare and prosperity of both parts of Ireland'. This endeavour is set in the context of broader European integration, an aspect which would be toned down by British officials in later versions. Paragraph 4 was at the heart of Hume's declaration. The British Prime Minister was to declare Britain no longer had any 'selfish, strategic, political or economic interest' in Ireland. Its sole interest was to promote peace and agreement among the inhabitants of the island. The audience was the Republican movement, as Hume endeavoured to remove the justification given for the armed struggle. Later versions of the Declaration returned, on British insistence, to the original Whitbread formula of 'no selfish strategic or economic interest' to avoid the implication that the British government was entirely indifferent to the future of Northern Ireland.

In Paragraph 5, the Taoiseach reciprocated by affirming that the exercise of the self-determination by the people of Ireland could only be achieved 'with the agreement and consent of the people of Northern Ireland'. The final paragraph indicated the intention to establish a permanent Irish Peace Convention to enable dialogue about Ireland's political future.

=== British–Irish Negotiations ===
The British government was first shown Hume's draft in December 1991. In 1992 further versions of the Declaration were drafted by Hume and Adams and shown to both governments, but the initiative began to develop greater momentum in 1993 with Albert Reynolds lending his weight to it, interrupting his holiday to hand over the latest version to Sir Robin Butler on 6 June 1993. Major had vowed at the outset of his premiership to put Northern Ireland 'on the front burner', but he was terrified of the fall out of and Unionist reaction if it emerged that he had been involved in drafting a secret agreement, particularly one which had emerged from John Hume's talks with Sinn Féin. Initially British officials would not then negotiate a joint text, although they did provide some comments. As time went on, however, the responsibility for drafting was devolved to Seán Ó hUiginn and Quentin Thomas. While the British officially refrained from drafting, they were happy to supply 'texts and references'. During September to November, the text took shape and incorporated amendments from Jim Molyneaux, Archbishop Eames, and Reverend Roy Magee, designed to make the text more palatable to the Unionist population, including the list of rights which would feature in the Good Friday Agreement of 1998.

With the text poised and agreement apparently close in late November 1993, the whole initiative was nearly derailed when Robin Butler and David Blatherwick handed Albert Reynolds an alternative British draft on 26 November 1993, on the basis that they feared the current text would be unacceptable to a Unionist audience. Reynolds was furious, feeling that years of work and painstaking negotiation over precise phrases had been undermined. The fallout of this incident overshadowed the Anglo-Irish summit of 3 December, but neither leader wanted to walk away from the initiative, and committed themselves 'to continue working urgently for a successful outcome'. The task of refining the text was delegated once more to Seán Ó hUiginn and Quentin Thomas, with final amendments made on 14 December 1993. The text was broadcast from a live press conference in Downing Street on 15 December 1993 and widely distributed in Northern Ireland with an accompanying note from the Secretary of State for Northern Ireland the following day.

== See also ==
- Principle of consent
