= Northern Irish nationalism =

Northern Irish nationalism may refer to:

- Ulster nationalism, movement that seeks the independence of Northern Ireland from the United Kingdom without joining the Republic of Ireland.
- Irish nationalism (movement which asserts that the whole island of Ireland should be a sovereign state), as it applies in Northern Ireland.
