= Repartition of Ireland =

Hypothetical redrawn border between the Republic of Ireland and Northern Ireland

A map showing the current Irish border

The repartition of Ireland has been suggested as a possible solution to the conflict in Northern Ireland. In 1922 Ireland was partitioned on county lines, and left Northern Ireland with a mixture of both unionists, who wish to remain in the United Kingdom, and nationalists, who wish to join a United Ireland. As the two communities are somewhat regionalised, redrawing the border to better divide the two groups was considered at various points throughout the 20th century.

== Political geography ==
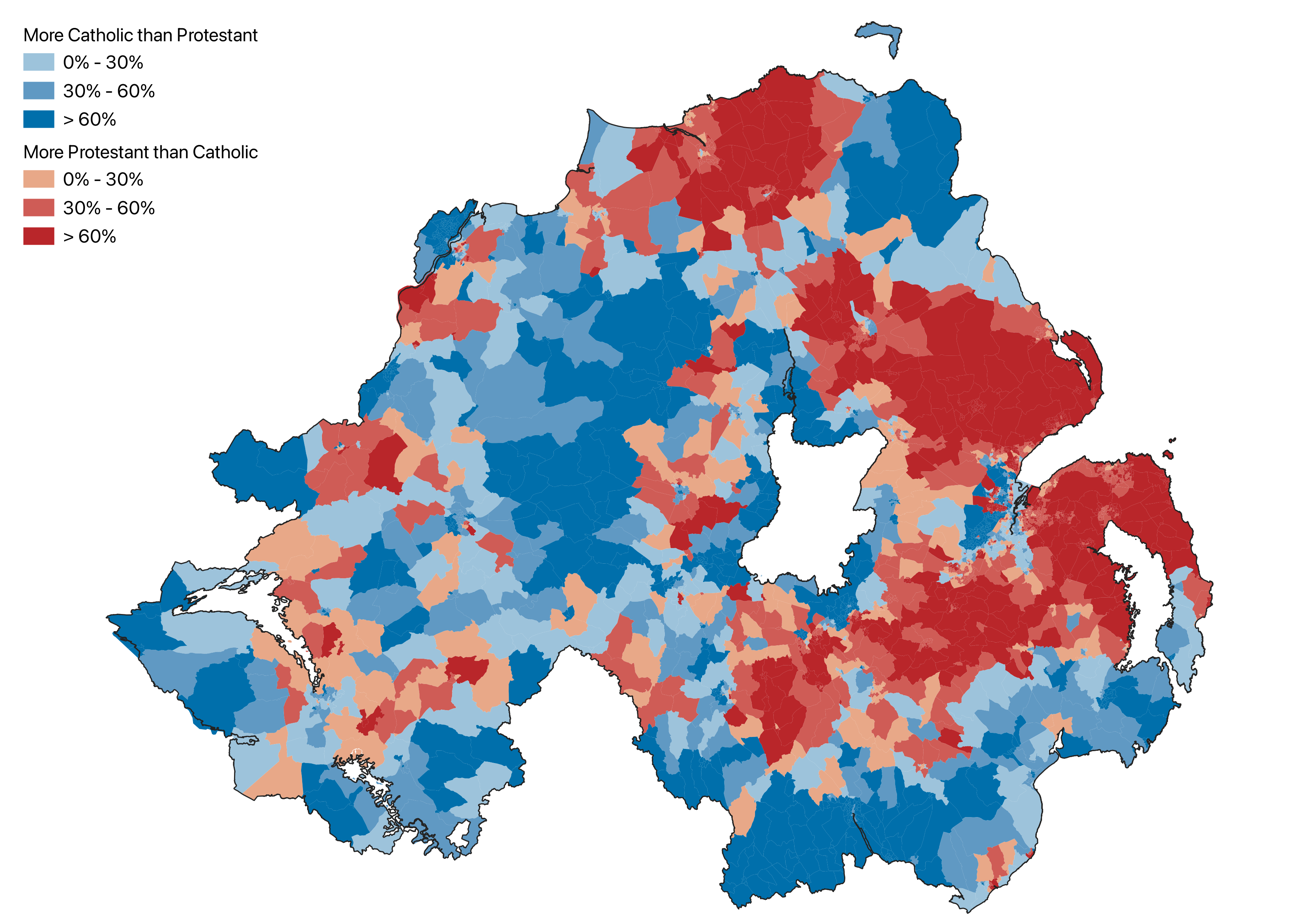
Map of religion or religion brought up in from the 2021 census in Northern Ireland.

As the border currently stands, Northern Ireland contains a slight Catholic — generally correlative with Irish nationalist — plurality, mostly in the south and west, but with significant numbers in Belfast and other communities concentrated particularly in the Glens of Antrim and around the shores of Lough Neagh. Protestants — correlative with Unionists — make up the majority of the population in the north and east, with some smaller communities in the south and west. The geographical area in which unionists are a majority is less than half of Northern Ireland, but eastern areas have a much higher population density.

== History ==
=== Irish Boundary Commission (1920s) ===
Border changes as proposed by the Irish Boundary Commission, 1925

A de facto border was established by the Government of Ireland Act 1920, in which the British Government established (or attempted to establish) two devolved administrations within the United Kingdom, Northern Ireland and Southern Ireland. The former consisted of north-easterly six of the nine counties of Ulster; the latter of the remaining 26 (including three of Ulster). In 1925, the Irish Boundary Commission was established to consider whether a more appropriate border might be drawn. On 7 November 1925 an English Conservative newspaper, The Morning Post, published leaked notes of the negotiations, including a draft map. The overall effects of the Boundary Commission's recommendations would have been the transfer of 286 square miles to the Free State and 77 square miles to Northern Ireland. The leaked report included, accurately, the Boundary Commission recommendation that parts of east County Donegal would be transferred to Northern Ireland, plus several other small tracts (see list here). Only 1 in every 25 Northern Irish Catholics would have been placed under Free State rule. The Boundary Commission's recommendations would have shortened the border by 51 miles (approx. 18%). The press leak effectively ended the commission's work. The three governments, however, determined another agreement on 6 December 1925 (subject to parliamentary approval) which confirmed the existing boundary of Northern Ireland, along with other matters. This new agreement was approved by the Dáil (the lower house of the Free State parliament) by a vote of 71 to 20, and in Westminster by the "Ireland (Confirmation of Agreement) Act" that was passed unanimously by the British parliament on 8–9 December. The Agreement was then formally registered with the League of Nations on 8 February 1926.

The 1937 Constitution of Ireland described the whole island of Ireland as the "National Territory", but this claim was dropped by the Nineteenth Amendment that permitted the Irish government to ratify the 1998 Good Friday Agreement.

=== Secret 1970s contingency plans ===
Repartition resurfaced as a possible option with the start of the Troubles. In 1972, the Conservative MP Julian Critchley published a pamphlet for the Bow Group advocating repartition, titled Ireland: A New Partition. In the mid-1970s Northern Ireland Secretary Merlyn Rees considered the possibility of ceding the IRA stronghold of South Armagh to the Republic, deciding against the matter as the Dublin authorities would likewise be unable to stop IRA activity in the area.

In 2003 secret plans were published for the first time, revealing that in 1972 civil servants in London had prepared a "last-ditch" plan for possible use in the event of a full-scale civil war, which would have seen Roman Catholic inhabitants of the northeast forcibly moved to Fermanagh, southern Londonderry, Tyrone, South Armagh and South Down. Protestant inhabitants of those areas would have been moved into North Down, Antrim, Northern Londonderry and North Armagh. The nationalist areas would then have been ceded to the Republic of Ireland. An alternative plan simply involved "moving individual Catholics from their homes in Northern Ireland to new homes in the Republic".

In late 1974 and early 1975, the Irish government believed a British withdrawal was being contemplated, and feared that this would lead to a full civil war in the north. Conservative MP David James pressed Prime Minister Harold Wilson to approach the Republic to see if they would be willing to swap South Armagh for areas of northern County Monaghan; Wilson was apparently keen on the idea, but thought that the government in Dublin would be unenthusiastic. Wilson supported granting independence to Northern Ireland as a Commonwealth dominion until it was rejected by the cabinet in November 1975.

A 1976 discussion paper for the Irish government, declassified in 2023, considered scenarios for redrawing the border based on local plebiscites, with ensuing voluntary repatriation to be jointly subsidised by Dublin and London. The portion transferred to the Republic was envisaged to be between 40% and 67% of the land area with respective populations of 323,000 (205,000 Catholic) and 485,000 (284,000 Catholic). The paper concluded such a scenario was unlikely to come about by agreement as opposed to "following large-scale inter-communal violence in the wake of British disengagement".

=== Thatcher's repartition paper (1984) ===
Pollsters have rarely asked the population of Northern Ireland about their attitudes to repartition but it was asked twice in the early 1980s. In June 1981 and February 1982, the percentages of Protestants agreeing to repartition was 9% and 8%; the percentages for Catholics were 22% and 24%.

Research by Paul Compton of Queen's University of Belfast (QUB) fed into a secret 1984 briefing paper prepared by the Northern Ireland Office for then-Prime Minister Margaret Thatcher, which examined various repartition schemes, the most extensive transferring to the Republic half of Northern Ireland's territory and one-third of its population, with West Belfast a "walled ghetto" enclave. The plans were quickly dismissed as impractical and politically unworkable. Later in 1984, then-Taoisaeach Garret FitzGerald spoke against repartition as reinforcing partition.

In 1986, QUB economic historian Liam Kennedy published a book-length study of repartition called Two Ulsters: A Case for Repartition.

=== UDA proposal (1994) ===
During the late 1980s and early 1990s, repartition was repeatedly proposed by assorted individuals and small groups. It became popular in some sections of the Ulster nationalist movement, who were keen to establish a state with a large Protestant majority. Conversely, the Ulster Movement for Self-Determination proposed an enlarged state of Ulster, including all the historic province. This state, were it to have been created, would have had almost equal numbers of nationalists and unionists.

In early January 1994, the Ulster Defence Association (UDA) released a document calling for repartition combined with ethnic cleansing or even genocide, with the goal of making Northern Ireland wholly Protestant. The plan was to be implemented should the British Army withdraw from Northern Ireland. The vastly Irish Catholic and nationalist areas would be handed over to the Republic, and those left stranded in the "Protestant state" would be "expelled, nullified, or interned". The story was printed in the Sunday Independent newspaper on 16 January. The "doomsday plan" was based on the work of Liam Kennedy, though he had not proposed expulsion. Sammy Wilson, then press officer for the Democratic Unionist Party and later the MP for East Antrim, spoke positively of the document, calling it a "valuable return to reality" and lauded the UDA for "contemplating what needs to be done to maintain our separate Ulster identity".

=== Later use of the term ===
In the years following the Good Friday agreement the border was softened by the removal of military checkpoints which had been in place during the Troubles. In the wake of the UK decision to leave the European Union in 2016, the role and nature of the border came into question once again. The term "repartition" is now however used in the context of a theoretical return to a hard border between the two states, rather than a fresh division of Northern Ireland. A hard border was ultimately avoided due to the implementation of the Northern Ireland Protocol in 2021.

== See also ==
- Partition (politics)
- Detachment (territory)
- Brexit and the Irish border
