= Alec Reid =

Irish Catholic priest (1931–2013)

The Reverend Alec Reid CSsR

Personal life
- Born: Alexander Reid; 5 August 1931 Dublin, Ireland
- Died: 22 November 2013 (aged 82) Rathgar, Dublin, Ireland
- Resting place: Milltown Cemetery, Belfast, Northern Ireland
- Education: University College Galway
- Known for: Role in Northern Ireland peace process

Religious life
- Religion: Christianity
- Denomination: Roman Catholic
- Church: Clonard Monastery
- Ordination: 1957

Senior posting
- Awards: Sabino Arana 2002 "World Mirror" prize; Gandhi Foundation International Peace Award

Alexander Reid CSsR (5 August 1931 – 22 November 2013) was an Irish Catholic priest noted for his facilitator role in the Northern Ireland peace process, a role BBC journalist Peter Taylor subsequently described as "absolutely critical" to its success.

== Biography ==
Reid was born on 5 August 1931 at Leonard's Corner nursing home on South Circular Road, Dublin, to David Reid, a carpenter, and his wife Mary (née Flannery). The eldest of four children, he had a brother and two sisters. His mother had strong Irish republican views and was a member of Cumann na mBan. From the age of six following the death of his father, Reid was raised in his mother's hometown of Nenagh, County Tipperary, and his mother married her sister's widower, Jack Glennon. Educated at St. Joseph's CBS Nenagh, Reid played hurling for Nenagh Éire Óg GAA. In 1948, he led Nenagh CBS hurling team to victory in the Dr Croke Cup, and in 1949 represented Tipperary in inter-county minor hurling. He studied English, history and philosophy at University College Galway.

In August 1949, shortly after his 18th birthday, Reid joined the Redemptorist order. He was professed on 8 September 1950, and ordained a priest in Galway on 22 September 1957. For the next four years, he gave Parish Missions in Limerick, Dundalk and Galway (Esker Friary), before moving to Clonard Monastery in Belfast, where he spent almost the next forty years. The Redemptorist Monastery at Clonard stands on the interface between the Catholic nationalist Falls Road and the Protestant loyalist Shankill Road areas of west Belfast.

In 2005, Reid retired to the Redemptorist community in Rathgar, Dublin. On his eightieth birthday in 2011, he fell critically ill, suffering from kidney failure, and thereafter spent long periods in hospital. Reid died of pancreatic cancer in a Rathgar nursing home on 22 November 2013. He was survived by his sisters and an aunt, and was buried in the Redemptorist plot in Milltown Cemetery, Belfast.

== Peace work ==
In 1975, with Ballymurphy priest Des Wilson, Reid sought to intercede in the increasingly deadly feud between the Official IRA and the Provisional Irish Republican Army (PIRA). Brought together in Wilson's Springhill home, representatives of each organisation eventually agreed a ceasefire, with the clergymen chairing regular incident meetings. With Wilson, Reid continued what Sinn Féin, and reputed Provisional Irish Republican Army (PIRA), leader Gerry Adams described as "an outreach programme”: the two priests "spoke to unionist paramilitaries and facilitated meetings between republicans and loyalists".

In the late 1980s, Reid facilitated a series of meetings between Gerry Adams and John Hume, in an effort to establish a 'Pan-Nationalist front' to enable a move toward renouncing violence in favour of negotiation. Reid, himself a staunch nationalist who favoured a united Ireland and the withdrawal of British forces from Northern Ireland, then acted as their contact person with the Irish Government in Dublin from a 1987 meeting with Charles Haughey up to the signing of the Good Friday Agreement in 1998. In this role, which was not public knowledge at the time, he held meetings with various Taoisigh, and particularly with Martin Mansergh, advisor to various Fianna Fáil leaders. After the eventual success of the peace negotiations, Gerry Adams said “there would not be a peace process at this time without [Father Reid’s] diligent doggedness and his refusal to give up.”

In 1988 in Belfast, Reid delivered the last rites to two British Army corporals, David Howes and Derek Wood of the Royal Corps of Signals, who were lynched by Catholic civilians and shot dead by the Provisional IRA — an event known as the corporals killings — after they drove into the funeral cortège of IRA member Kevin Brady, who had been killed by a loyalist gunman during the Milltown Cemetery attack. A photograph of his involvement in that incident became one of the starkest and most enduring images of the Troubles. Unknown until years later, Reid was carrying a letter from Sinn Féin President Gerry Adams to Social Democratic and Labour Party (SDLP) leader John Hume outlining Adams' suggestions for a political solution to the Troubles. Adams later told the BBC in 2019 that Reid also advised U.S Ambassador to Ireland Jean Kennedy Smith during the peace process, stating: "He was talking to her on the side and she was talking to her brother Teddy."

After he moved to Dublin, Reid was involved in peace efforts in the Basque Country. In January 2003, he was awarded the Sabino Arana 2002 "World Mirror" prize, by the Sabino Arana Foundation in Bilbao, in recognition of his efforts at promoting peace and reconciliation. Reid and a Methodist minister, the Rev. Harold Good, announced that the IRA had decommissioned their arms at a news conference in September 2005.

Reid was involved in controversy in November 2005 when he made comments during a meeting in Fitzroy Presbyterian Church concerning the Unionist community in Northern Ireland. When the loyalist activist Willie Frazer made remarks that Catholics had butchered Protestants during the Troubles, Reid angrily responded: "You don't want to hear the truth. The reality is that the nationalist community in Northern Ireland were treated almost like animals by the unionist community. They were not treated like human beings. They were treated like the Nazis treated the Jews". Reid later apologised, saying his remarks had been made in the heat of the moment. In an interview with CNN, he said that "The IRA were, if you like, a violent response to the suppression of human rights".

== Awards ==
- 1995 – Along with Dr Martin Mansergh and Presbyterian minister the Reverend Roy Magee, he was awarded the 1995 Tipperary International Peace Award, now described as "Ireland's outstanding award for humanitarian work".
- 2005 – awarded an honorary doctorate by NUI Galway.
- 2008 – received the Gandhi Foundation International Peace Award together with Reverend Harold Good.
- 2008 – made an Honorary Graduate of the University of Ulster and made a Doctor of the University (DUniv) in their Summer Graduation ceremonies, in recognition of his contribution to the Northern Ireland peace process.
- 2009 – awarded the Reflections of Hope Award by the Oklahoma City National Memorial and Museum.
