= Martin Mansergh =

Irish political advisor and politician (1946–2025)

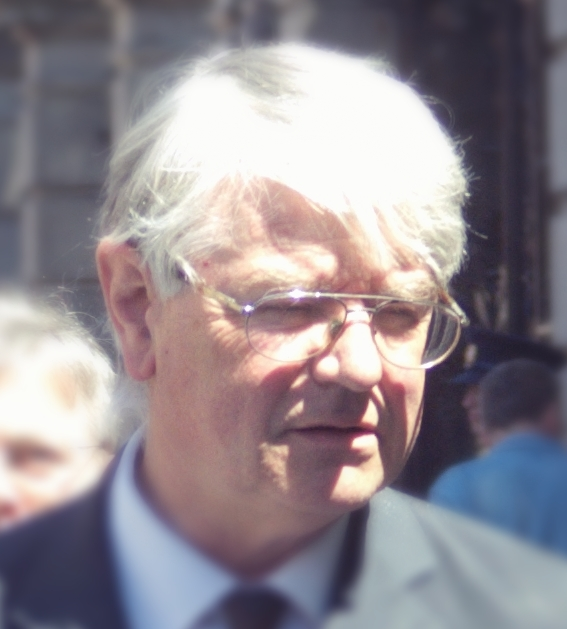
- Mansergh in 2009

Minister of State
- 2010–2011: Tourism, Culture and Sport
- 2008–2011: Finance
- 2008–2010: Arts, Sport and Tourism

Teachta Dála
- In office May 2007 – February 2011
- Constituency: Tipperary South

Senator
- In office 12 September 2002 – 24 May 2007
- Constituency: Agricultural Panel

Personal details
- Born: 31 December 1946 Woking, England
- Died: 26 September 2025 (aged 78) Western Sahara
- Party: Fianna Fáil
- Spouse: Elizabeth Young
- Children: 5
- Education: Christ Church, Oxford

Martin George Southcote Mansergh (31 December 1946 – 26 September 2025) was an Irish Fianna Fáil politician who served as a Minister of State from 2008 to 2011. He served as a Teachta Dála (TD) for the Tipperary South constituency from 2007 to 2011. He was a Senator for the Agricultural Panel from 2002 to 2007. He played a leading role in developing Fianna Fáil policy on Northern Ireland.

== Background ==
Mansergh was born on 31 December 1946 in Woking, Surrey, England, to Diana Mary (née Keeton) and Nicholas Mansergh, a County Tipperary-born Irish historian. His forefathers were part of the Anglo-Irish Protestant Ascendancy and arrived in Ireland with Oliver Cromwell. He was raised in England and lived in the Cambridgeshire town of Little Shelford. Mansergh was educated at The King's School, Canterbury, and Christ Church, Oxford, where he studied Politics, Philosophy and Economics and obtained a PhD in pre-revolutionary French history. A member of the Church of Ireland, he was married to Elizabeth (née Young), the daughter of a Glasgow doctor, with whom he had four daughters and one son. He sat on the board of Bolton Library for several years.

Mansergh died from a heart attack in the Western Sahara, on 26 September 2025, at the age of 78. He was on a trip there with other retired parliamentarians.

== Career ==
Mansergh entered the Department of Foreign Affairs, being appointed a Third secretary in 1974 and became a First Secretary in 1977. Later recruited by Taoiseach Charles Haughey, he worked for the Fianna Fáil party thereafter, serving under three Fianna Fáil leaders as Director of Research, Policy and Special Advisor on Northern Ireland where he was involved in discussions between the nationalist parties and the Irish Government and met regularly with intermediary Father Alec Reid.

He was a key member of the team which formed the Fianna Fáil–Labour Party coalition in 1992 and was also involved in the formation of the Fianna Fáil–Progressive Democrats coalition in 1997. As a senior adviser to successive Taoisigh, Mansergh played a key role in the Northern Ireland peace process for over twenty years. He ran for Fianna Fáil as a Dáil candidate in the Tipperary South constituency at the 2002 general election but failed to be elected with 14.2% of the poll. However, Mansergh was elected to the 22nd Seanad by the Agricultural Panel in July of that year. At the 2007 general election he again ran for Fianna Fáil as a Dáil candidate in the Tipperary South constituency, this time being elected with 15.7% of the poll. He was appointed to the Council of State by President Mary McAleese and served from 2004 to 2011.

Until 2006 he wrote a weekly column for The Irish Times, but resigned because of the upcoming general election. In May 2008, he was appointed by the government of Brian Cowen as Minister of State at the Department of Finance with special responsibility for the Office of Public Works and Minister of State at the Department of Arts, Sport and Tourism with special responsibility for the Arts.

In January 2009, he offered to quit his junior ministry post to save money and called on people to retain their Celtic Tiger style optimism and self-respect. He said: "We're not going to get anywhere by completely throwing overboard our self respect. We have achieved a tremendous amount in the past 20 years – they were the best 20 years in our history. There will be cycles – we rose very high and we are where we are now. We have to work our way out of this intelligently". However, he was re-appointed to his positions when Cowen reduced the number of junior ministers from 20 to 15.

Mansergh lost his seat at the 2011 general election.

He was vice-chair of the government's Expert Advisory Group on the Decade of Centenaries. Mansergh was elected a member of the Royal Irish Academy in May 2018. He had been a frequent contributor to The Irish Catholic.

== Media image ==
Mansergh had been a strong supporter of former Taoiseach Bertie Ahern, whose financial affairs were investigated by the Mahon Tribunal. He was accused by some commentators of being insulting, condescending and petulant to opposition politicians. In February 2008, on the RTÉ Radio 1 show Morning Ireland, Mansergh insisted that Ahern's difficulties were no more than a spot of "inflight turbulence," with a safe landing in sight. When Fine Gael's tribunal expert, Senator Eugene Regan dissented, Mansergh became quite agitated, questioning why Regan wanted to question Ahern's finances declaring to Regan that: "You should have respect for your betters!"

Mansergh was mentioned by name in the TV series, Charlie, where Taoiseach, Charles Haughey, in a conversation with Alec Reid, places him in charge of drawing up a roadmap to peace in Northern Ireland.

== Honours and awards ==
Along with Father Alec Reid and the Reverend Roy Magee, he was awarded the 1995 Tipperary International Peace Award, now described as "Ireland's outstanding award for humanitarian work". Carlow College awarded its inaugural Columbanus Medal in November 2018, to Mansergh, in recognition of his contribution to the peace process in Ireland.

== Works ==
- Mansergh, Martin, The Legacy of History for Making Peace in Ireland, 2003, ISBN 978-1-85635-389-2, ISBN 1-85635-389-3

Dáil	Election	Deputy (Party)	Deputy (Party)	Deputy (Party)	Deputy (Party)
13th	1948	Michael Davern (FF)	Richard Mulcahy (FG)	Dan Breen (FF)	John Timoney (CnaP)
14th	1951	Michael Davern (FF)	Richard Mulcahy (FG)	Dan Breen (FF)	Patrick Crowe (FG)
15th	1954	Michael Davern (FF)	Richard Mulcahy (FG)	Dan Breen (FF)	Patrick Crowe (FG)
16th	1957	Michael Davern (FF)	Richard Mulcahy (FG)	Dan Breen (FF)	Frank Loughman (FF)
17th	1961	Michael Davern (FF)	Patrick Hogan (FG)	Dan Breen (FF)	Seán Treacy (Note: Treacy served as Ceann Comhairle in the 20th Dáil from 1973 to 1977, and was returned automatically at the 1977 election. He lost the Labour party whip in February 1985.) (Lab)
18th	1965	Don Davern (FF)	Patrick Hogan (FG)	Jackie Fahey (FF)	Seán Treacy (Lab)
19th	1969	Noel Davern (FF)	Patrick Hogan (FG)	Jackie Fahey (FF)	Seán Treacy (Lab)
20th	1973	Noel Davern (FF)	Brendan Griffin (FG)	Jackie Fahey (FF)	Seán Treacy (Lab)
21st	1977	Noel Davern (FF)	Brendan Griffin (FG)	3 seats 1977–1981	Seán Treacy (Lab)
22nd	1981	Carrie Acheson (FF)	Brendan Griffin (FG)	Seán McCarthy (FF)	Seán Treacy (Lab)
23rd	1982 (Feb)	Seán Byrne (FF)	Brendan Griffin (FG)	Seán McCarthy (FF)	Seán Treacy (Lab)
24th	1982 (Nov)	Seán Byrne (FF)	Brendan Griffin (FG)	Seán McCarthy (FF)	Seán Treacy (Lab)
25th	1987	Noel Davern (FF)	Brendan Griffin (FG)	Seán McCarthy (FF)	Seán Treacy (Note: Treacy served as Ceann Comhairle in the 25th, 26th and 27th Dáil from 1987 to 1997, and was returned automatically at the 1989 and 1992 elections.) (Ind.)
26th	1989	Noel Davern (FF)	Theresa Ahearn (FG)	Michael Ferris (Lab)	Seán Treacy (Ind.)
27th	1992	Noel Davern (FF)	Theresa Ahearn (FG)	Michael Ferris (Lab)	Seán Treacy (Ind.)
28th	1997	Noel Davern (FF)	Theresa Ahearn (FG)	Michael Ferris (Lab)	3 seats from 1997
28th	2000 by-election	Noel Davern (FF)	Theresa Ahearn (FG)	Séamus Healy (Ind.)	3 seats from 1997
28th	2001 by-election	Noel Davern (FF)	Tom Hayes (FG)	Séamus Healy (Ind.)	3 seats from 1997
29th	2002	Noel Davern (FF)	Tom Hayes (FG)	Séamus Healy (Ind.)	3 seats from 1997
30th	2007	Mattie McGrath (FF)	Tom Hayes (FG)	Martin Mansergh (FF)	3 seats from 1997
31st	2011	Mattie McGrath (Ind.)	Tom Hayes (FG)	Séamus Healy (WUA)	3 seats from 1997
32nd	2016	Constituency abolished. See Tipperary			

Dáil	Election	Deputy (Party)	Deputy (Party)	Deputy (Party)
34th	2024	Mattie McGrath (Ind.)	Michael Murphy (FG)	Séamus Healy (Ind.)
