= Ulster Movement for Self-Determination =

The Ulster Movement for Self-Determination was a minor Ulster nationalist political movement in Northern Ireland.

The UMSD was formed in 1986, after emerging from the Ulster Clubs. The group took as its emblem a map of the nine counties of Ulster and, in contrast to other strains of Ulster nationalism that have developed, felt that independence for Northern Ireland should be accompanied by repartition, creating the historic Ulster as an independent state by also incorporating the counties of Cavan, Donegal and Monaghan from the Republic of Ireland. This position was confirmed by an anonymous UMSD spokesman who described the three counties as "our rightful heritage" in an interview with John Coulter of the Sunday News in 1987. In a further interview the following year Coulter said that the spokesman suggested either the Reverend Hugh Ross or David Trimble as a potential leader for the proposed independent state.

The UMSD, which grew out of Ulster loyalism but never had the backing of any paramilitary group (or indeed, even minor support), failed to gain any foothold in Northern Irish politics and was gone by 1994. The actual fate of the group is unclear, although it has been suggested that it formed the basis of the Ulster Independence Committee and was thus effectively replaced by the higher profile Ulster Independence Movement.
