= Solidarity (British trade union) =

- Solidarity the Union
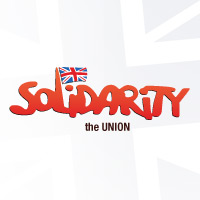
- Named after: Solidarność
- Founded: 2005; 21 years ago
- Headquarters: Edinburgh, United Kingdom
- Location: United Kingdom
- Members: 185 (2024)
- Secretary General: Patrick Harrington
- Website: solidaritytradeunion.org

Solidarity is a United Kingdom trade union formed in late 2005 by the far-right British National Party (BNP). It is named after the Polish trade union Solidarność, and its logo is also inspired by that of the Polish union.

Solidarity recruits from all industrial sectors and professions. Solidarity has already stated that it has no plans to apply for affiliation to the Trades Union Congress (TUC) and will not be bound, therefore, by agreements not to poach members from other unions.

== Leadership ==
The first union president was Adam Walker, a BNP member and three times a parliamentary candidate (in Bishop Auckland in 2010 and 2017 and in Rotherham in 2015). Since 2015, he has been chairman of the BNP, following the departure of Nick Griffin as leader. Walker was subsequently replaced as union president by David Kerr. Kerr was replaced as president in November 2019 by Glen Nicklasson.

The union's general secretary is Patrick Harrington.

== Controversies ==
=== BNP funding ===
In a 2006 report in the newspaper Wales on Sunday, John Walker, then national treasurer of the BNP, claimed that the union was likely to contribute funds to the party:

"There probably will be a political levy at some stage to the BNP just as other unions raise money for Labour. It is quite possible and feasible that when Solidarity becomes fully functional some element of funds raised will be donated to the BNP, but that will have to be decided through consultation with the membership."

Solidarity's general secretary, Harrington, responded in a letter to the newspaper that this was Walker's "personal opinion", that the recipients of union grants would be decided directly by members, and that members could opt out of the political fund if one were to be established.

Solidarity's annual returns to the Certification Office from 2006 to 2018 indicate that the union has not established a political fund.

=== Alleged front status ===
Allegations that Solidarity is a BNP front organisation were first made by Searchlight magazine on the Stop the BNP website on 24 January 2006 and repeated by Barrie Clement in The Independent on 1 February 2006.

== Membership numbers ==
In figures filed with the Certification Office for 31 December 2019, Solidarity said it had 173 members, up from 139 in the previous year. The same figure for 2022 stated the union has 192 members.
