= 1990 Upper Bann by-election =

1990 UK Parliamentary by-election

- 17 May 1990

Constituency of Upper Bann
- Turnout: 53.4% (▼12.6%)
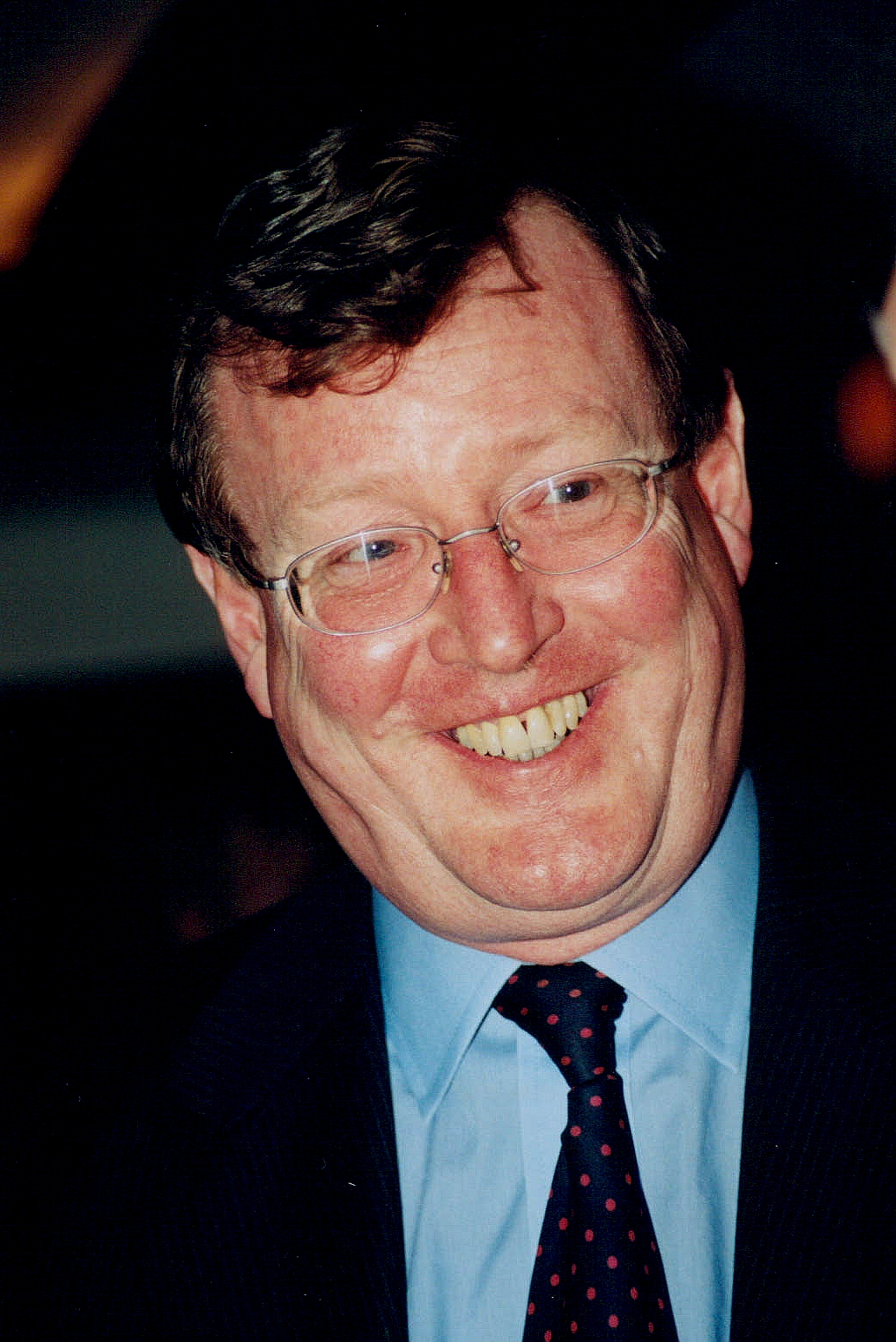

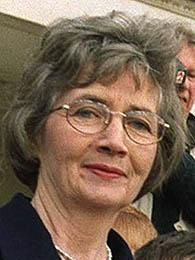
	First party	Second party	Third party
			SF
Candidate	David Trimble	Bríd Rodgers	Sheena Campbell
Party	UUP	SDLP	Sinn Féin
Popular vote	20,547	6,698	2,033
Percentage	58.0%	18.9%	5.7%
Swing	▼3.5%	▼1.6%	▼1.7%
MP before election
Harold McCusker
UUP
Subsequent MP
David Trimble
UUP

The 1990 by-election in Upper Bann was caused by the death of the sitting Ulster Unionist Party Member of Parliament Harold McCusker on 2 February 1990.

The by-election was especially notable for three reasons. Firstly, the Sinn Féin candidate in the election, Sheena Campbell, was murdered by the UVF in Belfast on 16 October 1992.

Eleven candidates stood in the by-election, which to date is the record for a parliamentary election in Northern Ireland. Secondly, amongst the eleven were candidates for the Conservative Party and the 'continuing' Social Democratic Party (SDP), both contesting parliamentary elections in Northern Ireland for the first time since the "Equal Citizenship" campaign had sought to get the major UK parties to organise in the province. Finally the successful Ulster Unionist candidate was David Trimble, who five years later would become the leader of the party.

The SDP candidate took only 154 votes, and finished in eleventh and last place – the worst performance in a by-election by any party with MPs sitting in the House of Commons since the English National Party in the 1976 Rotherham by-election.

== Result ==
1990 Upper Bann by-election
Party	Candidate	Votes	%	±%
UUP	David Trimble	20,547	58.0	−3.5
SDLP	Bríd Rodgers	6,698	18.9	−1.6
Sinn Féin	Sheena Campbell	2,033	5.7	−1.7
Ulster Independence	Hugh Ross	1,534	4.3	N/A
Workers' Party	Tom French	1,083	3.1	−1.6
NI Conservatives	Colette Jones	1,038	3.0	N/A
Alliance	William Ramsay	948	2.7	−3.2
Ulster Democratic	Gary McMichael	600	1.7	N/A
Green	Peter Doran	576	1.6	N/A
Independent Labour	Erskine Holmes	235	0.6	N/A
SDP	Alistair Dunn	154	0.4	N/A
Majority		13,849	39.1	−1.9
Turnout		35,446	53.4	−12.6
Registered electors		66,377		
UUP hold		Swing		

== General election result, 1987 ==
General election 1987: Upper Bann
Party	Candidate	Votes	%	±%
UUP	Harold McCusker	25,137	61.5	+4.6
SDLP	Bríd Rodgers	8,676	20.5	+3.7
Sinn Féin	Brendan Curran	3,126	7.4	−2.0
Alliance	Mary Cook	2,487	5.9	N/A
Workers' Party	Tom French	2,004	4.7	−0.8
Majority		17,361	41.0	0.0
Turnout		41,430	66.0	−6.0
Registered electors		64,540		
UUP hold		Swing		
