= Hugh Ross (Northern Ireland politician) =

Leader of the Ulster Independence Movement
- In office 17 November 1988 – January 2000
- Preceded by: Party founded
- Succeeded by: Party dissolved

Personal details
- Born: 1944 (age 81–82) Dungannon, County Tyrone, Northern Ireland
- Party: Ulster Independence Movement (1988–2000)

Hugh Ross (born c. 1944) is an Ulster nationalist politician, Presbyterian minister and member of the Orange Order, who was previously the leader of the now defunct Ulster Independence Movement (UIM).

== UIM leadership ==
Ross began his political involvement with the Ulster Clubs which emerged in the 1980s to galvanise opposition to the Anglo-Irish Agreement and appeared on the BBC's local news programme in August 1986 to launch an attack on cross-border co-operation. Eventually the UIM developed out of this group and Ross became leader of the main avowedly Ulster nationalist organisation in Northern Ireland's history.

Ross enjoyed relatively high vote shares as a candidate at both the Upper Bann by-election of 1990 and the 1994 European elections. He headed the list for the UIM at the 1996 elections for the Northern Ireland Forum (a precursor to the Northern Ireland Assembly) although he failed to get elected and has since largely left politics, emerging from time to time to write articles for the Ulster Third Way journal, Ulster Nation.

As a member of the Orange Order, Rev Ross was also involved in the difficulties over the march to Drumcree Church and addressed rallies of Order supporters in the area.

== The Committee allegations ==
Ross' retirement from the political scene was in part caused by accusations in a Channel 4 documentary that he was part of a committee which oversaw collusion between the Royal Ulster Constabulary and loyalists.

The programme and resulting book claimed that the Ulster Loyalist Central Co-ordinating Committee (ULCCC), an umbrella group for loyalist paramilitary organisations that had been refounded in 1991 actually acted as a co-ordination body between a number of leading community figures including Ross, Ulster Bank chief Billy Abernethy with elements of the Royal Ulster Constabulary and loyalist gunmen such as Billy Wright with the aim of identifying targets. One of the leading sources for the book was Jim Sands, a UIM member who served as assistant to Ross. Sands claimed that Ross was a leading member of the ULCCC and thus had an input in deciding the targets of loyalist terror groups. Sands further claimed that Ross believed in a militantly violent path to Ulster nationalism and claimed in a 1991 interview that Ross aimed to form a symbiotic relationship between the UIM and Ulster Resistance in the style of Sinn Féin and the Provisional Irish Republican Army. Other UIM activists were implicated in the allegations, such as Nelson McCausland, whilst Abernethy was a supporter having signed the nomination papers for Ross's candidacy in Upper Bann.

In response to the initial broadcast Ross appeared on the Channel 4 programme Right to Reply. During the show Ross argued that he had no links to paramilitaries or the 'Inner Force' of the RUC and added that clips shown of him speaking had been taken out of context and amounted to only a few minutes from an interview that lasted a few hours. He further added that he had only agreed to work with the Committee's makers as he felt it was an opportunity to promote his largely unknown political party. Ross was accompanied to the studio by David Trimble and it was later alleged that the two had a close relationship, founded on their mutual interest in Ulster nationalism (it being claimed that after his spell in the Vanguard Progressive Unionist Party Trimble had been involved in authoring the pro-independence booklet Beyond the Religious Divide, produced by the New Ulster Political Research Group in 1977).

Following the Right to Reply appearance Ross sent a letter to the producers of the Committee threatening them with a defamation suit, although ultimately nothing came of this. Sands would later claim that his evidence regarding UIM involvement in any conspiracy had been a hoax. Despite this Ross was photographed in July 1995 at what was purported to be ULCCC meeting in attendance with Abernethy and Alex Kerr, an associate of Billy Wright.

Ultimately the allegations remained unproven, but the incident damaged Ross's reputation and saw membership of the UIM dwindle. The group disappeared after the 1996 Northern Ireland Forum elections and Ross took no further part in politics.

== Bibliography ==
- Sean McPhilemy, The Committee – Political Assassination in Northern Ireland, Niwot, Colorado: Roberts Rinehart, 1998
