= Ulster Clubs =

The Ulster Clubs was the name given to a network of Unionist organisations founded in Northern Ireland in November 1985. Emerging from an earlier group based in Portadown, the Ulster Clubs briefly mobilised wide support across Northern Ireland and sought to coordinate opposition to the development of closer relations between the governments of the United Kingdom and Ireland. The group's motto was "hope for the best and prepare for the worst".

== Origins ==
The movement had its origins in the Portadown Action Committee, a group established in the County Armagh town during the middle of 1985 to oppose plans to reroute the traditional 12 July Orange Order parades away from nationalist areas of the town. This group was reconstituted as a wider umbrella movement, the United Ulster Loyalist Front (UULF) not long after the Twelfth. Leadership of the group rested with Alan Wright, a member of the Salvation Army, whose policeman father had been murdered by the Irish National Liberation Army in 1979.

The UULF was given the support of the paramilitary Ulster Defence Association (UDA) with South Belfast Brigade chief and UDA deputy leader John McMichael being appointed to the group's coordinating committee. Following the signing of the Anglo-Irish Agreement in November 1985 by Margaret Thatcher and Garret FitzGerald, the UULF organised a rally in Belfast in opposition to the agreement. Those in attendance dressed in combat clothes with dark glasses and slouch hats, indicating the support the group had secured from the UDA as well as the Ulster Volunteer Force (UVF).

== Development ==
After an initial flurry of activity, the UULF, which was a loose alliance at best, ground to a halt. However, the movement was given a new lease of life when a meeting was held at the Ulster Hall on 1 November at which the formation of a more formalised arrangement, the Ulster Clubs, was announced. A network of clubs was to be established across Northern Ireland with the aim, according to Ian S. Wood, of working to uphold "equal citizenship" and "fight the erosion of their Protestant heritage". Before long 88 clubs had been established, with around 20,000 members listed as having joined. The new name was chosen in homage to a similarly titled network established by Edward Carson during the crisis surrounding the Government of Ireland Act 1914.

Wright hoped that the Ulster Clubs could organise a widespread campaign of civil disobedience that would make Northern Ireland ungovernable and endorsed such initiatives as the mass resignation of Unionist MPs and a Day of Action held on 3 March 1986, which featured mass protest marches and strike action. Individual members of the Ulster Clubs also became involved in Peter Robinson's ill-fated attempt to launch an "invasion" of southern Ireland on 7 August 1986, when he led a group of supporters into Clontibret in County Monaghan. Andrew Park of Lisburn was deputy leader and took up the reins of the movement when Alan Wright was hospitalised and took over as leader when he resigned. Andrew Park later became deputy leader of the Progressive Unionist Party.

== Relationship to paramilitarism ==
John McMichael was enthusiastic about this development and urged support for the new movement, reasoning that if, as many loyalists suspected, a widespread confrontation was going to follow the agreement, then people who would not normally have joined paramilitary groups could be mobilised through the Ulster Clubs. The clubs also attracted a hardcore of evangelicals, mainly from County Armagh, who were veterans of the Ulster Protestant Volunteers and who saw the Ulster Clubs as a basis for a new armed group. Orange Order leader Joel Patton, who later came to prominence during the Drumcree conflict, felt that the Ulster Clubs, which he helped to establish, could effectively take the place of the Royal Ulster Constabulary (RUC), a group he felt had been pitted against the unionist community as a result of the Anglo-Irish Agreement. Wright echoed Patton's sentiments and even hinted that he would be prepared to fight the RUC and the British Army to destroy the Anglo-Irish Agreement.

The clubs also played a role in the formation of Ulster Resistance in late 1986, fusing with elements of the "Third Force" grouping promoted by Ian Paisley. In November 1986, Alan Wright spoke at the Ulster Hall rally that launched Ulster Resistance, although there were many within the Ulster Clubs who advised him against closely allying himself with Paisley, given that in the past the Democratic Unionist Party leader had worked with loyalist paramilitaries only to distance himself from them when it became politically expedient. Under Andrew Park's leadership this relationship radically changed with the forming of the ULMC (Ulster Loyalist Military Command) in which the Ulster Clubs played an integral part.

== Ulster nationalism ==
The Ulster Clubs also became influenced by the ideas of Ulster nationalism as an alternative to unionism, given that many saw the Anglo-Irish Agreement as a 'sell-out' by the Government of the state to which they claimed loyalty. Hugh Ross was a member of and developed his Ulster Independence Movement from within the Ulster Clubs, whilst the Ulster Movement for Self-Determination also emerged from within the clubs. The Treasurer of the Ulster Clubs, Colin Abernethy, who was connected to Ulster nationalism, was killed by the Provisional Irish Republican Army while travelling to work on 9 September 1988. Abernethy was a close friend of Andrew Park who became leader shortly after his murder. The Ulster Clubs also published a document advocating the establishment of a "Dominion of Ulster" within the British Commonwealth penned by future Ulster Unionist Party leader David Trimble.

== Decline ==
In 1988 the British government began to move against the Ulster Clubs, punishing a number of members for various offences under the Public Order Act 1986, whilst by that time leadership of the anti-Anglo-Irish Campaign had been secured by Paisley and Jim Molyneaux. In October 1988 Wright was imprisoned for refusing to pay fines for traffic offences and public order transgressions, claiming that he was doing so as part of his protest against the agreement. By this point membership had fallen to an estimated 12,000.

Wright resigned from the leadership in 1989, claiming that he hoped to undertake study at Bible College and, under new leadership of Andrew Park their policy changed radically to one advocating complete integration with the rest of the United Kingdom and a commitment to direct rule as the norm. By the 1990s the Ulster Clubs had all but disappeared. The group no longer exists.

== Bibliography ==
- Ed Moloney, Paisley: From Demagogue to Democrat?, Poolbeg, 2008
- Peter Taylor, Loyalists, Bloomsbury, 2000
- Ian S. Wood, Crimes of Loyalty: A History of the UDA, Edinburgh University Press, 2006
