= Ulster nationalism =

Ideology that supports independence for Northern Ireland

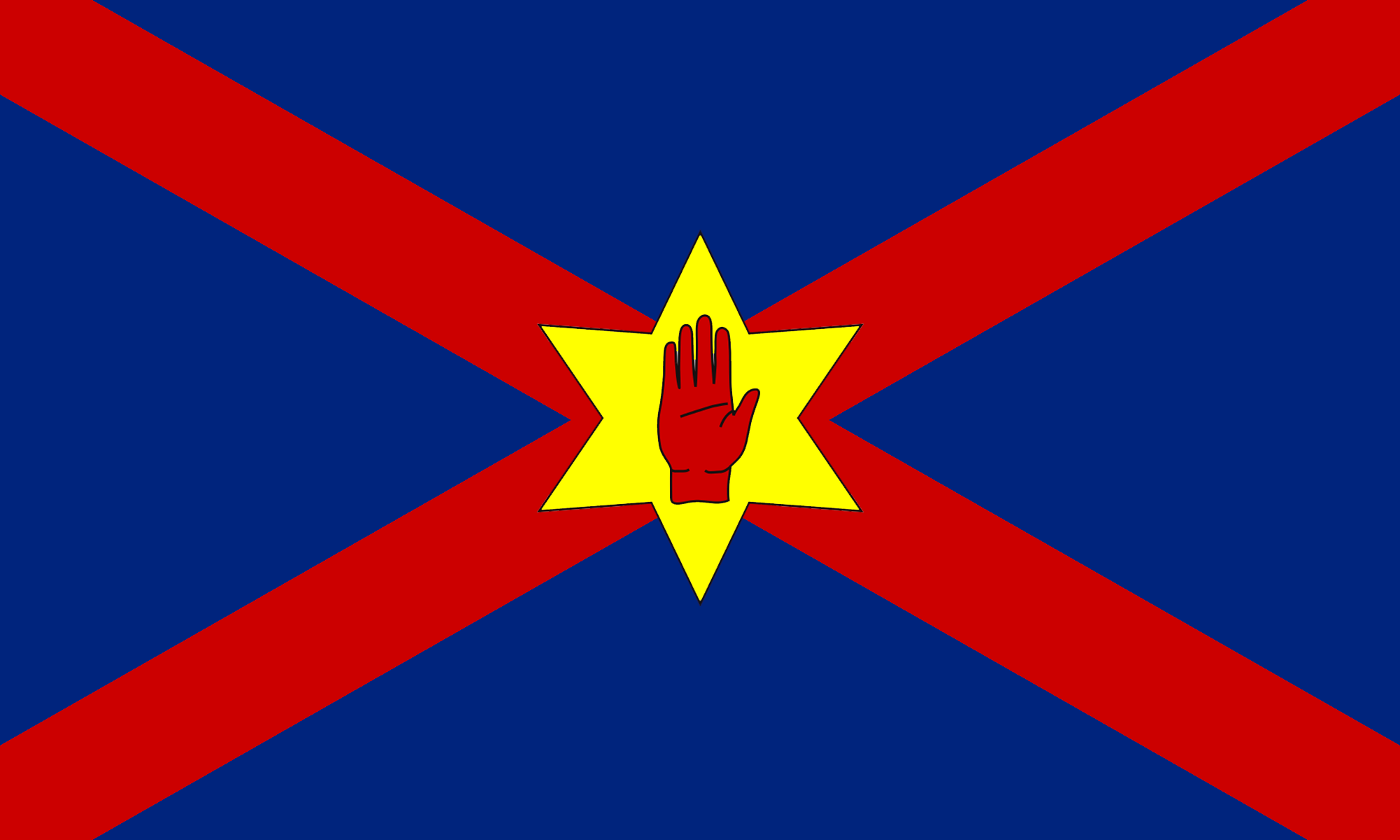
The unofficial flag of the 'Ulster Nation' proposed by Ulster nationalists.

Northern Ireland (dark yellow) within the United Kingdom (light yellow) along with the Republic of Ireland and Isle of Man

Ulster nationalism is a minor school of thought in the politics of Northern Ireland that seeks the independence of Northern Ireland from the United Kingdom without joining the Republic of Ireland, thereby becoming an independent sovereign state separate from both.

Independence has been supported by groups such as Ulster Third Way and some factions of the Ulster Defence Association. However, it is a fringe view in Northern Ireland. It is neither supported by any of the political parties represented in the Northern Ireland Assembly nor by the government of the United Kingdom or the government of the Republic of Ireland.

Although the term Ulster traditionally refers to one of the four traditional provinces of Ireland which contains Northern Ireland as well as parts of the Republic of Ireland, the term is often used within unionism and Ulster loyalism (from which Ulster nationalism originated) to refer solely to Northern Ireland.

== History ==
=== Craig in 1921 ===
In November 1921, during negotiations for the Anglo-Irish Treaty, there was correspondence between David Lloyd George and Sir James Craig, respective prime ministers of the UK and Northern Ireland. Lloyd George envisaged a choice for Northern Ireland between, on the one hand, remaining part of the UK under the Government of Ireland Act 1920, while what had been Southern Ireland became a Dominion; and, on the other hand, becoming part of an all-Ireland Dominion where the Stormont parliament was subordinate to a parliament in Dublin instead of Westminster. Craig responded that a third option would be for Northern Ireland to be a Dominion in parallel with Southern Ireland and the "Overseas Dominions", saying "while Northern Ireland would deplore any loosening of the tie between Great Britain and herself she would regard the loss of representation at Westminster as a less evil than inclusion in an all-Ireland Parliament".

=== W. F. McCoy and Dominion status ===
Ulster nationalism has its origins in 1946 when W. F. McCoy, a former cabinet minister in the government of Northern Ireland, advocated this option. He wanted Northern Ireland to become a dominion with a political system similar to Canada, New Zealand, Australia and the then Union of South Africa, or the Irish Free State prior to 1937. McCoy, a lifelong member of the Ulster Unionist Party, felt that the uncertain constitutional status of Northern Ireland made the Union vulnerable and so saw his own form of limited Ulster nationalism as a way to safeguard Northern Ireland's relationship with the United Kingdom.

Some members of the Ulster Vanguard movement, led by Bill Craig, in the early 1970s published similar arguments, most notably Professor Kennedy Lindsay. In the early 1970s, in the face of the British government prorogation of the government of Northern Ireland, Craig, Lindsay and others argued in favour of a unilateral declaration of independence (UDI) from Great Britain similar to that declared in Rhodesia a few years previously. Lindsay later founded the British Ulster Dominion Party to this end but it faded into obscurity around 1979.

=== Loyalism and Ulster nationalism ===
Whilst early versions of Ulster nationalism had been designed to safeguard the status of Northern Ireland, the movement saw something of a rebirth in the 1970s, particularly following the 1972 suspension of the Parliament of Northern Ireland and the resulting political uncertainty in the region. Glenn Barr, a Vanguard Unionist Progressive Party Assemblyman and Ulster Defence Association leader, described himself in 1973 as "an Ulster nationalist". The successful Ulster Workers Council Strike in 1974 (which was directed by Barr) was later described by the Secretary of State for Northern Ireland Merlyn Rees as an "outbreak of Ulster nationalism". Labour Prime Minister Jim Callaghan also thought an independent Northern Ireland might be viable.

After the strike loyalism began to embrace Ulster nationalist ideas, with the UDA, in particular, advocating this position. Firm proposals for an independent Ulster were produced in 1976 by the Ulster Loyalist Central Co-ordinating Committee and in 1977 by the UDA's New Ulster Political Research Group. The NUPRG document, Beyond the Religious Divide, has been recently republished with a new introduction. John McMichael, as candidate for the UDA-linked Ulster Loyalist Democratic Party, campaigned for the 1982 South Belfast by-election on the basis of negotiations towards independence. However, McMichael's poor showing of 576 votes saw the plans largely abandoned by the UDA soon after, although the policy was still considered by the Ulster Democratic Party under Ray Smallwoods. A short-lived Ulster Independence Party also operated, although the assassination of its leader, John McKeague, in 1982 saw it largely disappear.

=== Post-Anglo-Irish Agreement ===
The idea enjoyed something of a renaissance in the aftermath of the Anglo-Irish Agreement, with the Ulster Clubs amongst those to consider the notion. After a series of public meetings, leading Ulster Clubs member, Reverend Hugh Ross, set up the Ulster Independence Committee in 1988, which soon re-emerged as the Ulster Independence Movement advocating full independence of Northern Ireland from Britain. After a reasonable showing in the 1990 Upper Bann by-election, the group stepped up its campaigning in the aftermath of the Downing Street Declaration and enjoyed a period of increased support immediately after the Good Friday Agreement (also absorbing the Ulster Movement for Self-Determination, which desired all of Ulster as the basis for independence, along the way). No tangible electoral success was gained however, and the group was further damaged by allegations against Ross in a Channel 4 documentary on collusion, The Committee, leading to the group reconstituting as a ginger group in 2000.

With the UIM defunct, Ulster nationalism was then represented by the Ulster Third Way, which was involved in the publication of the Ulster Nation, a journal of radical Ulster nationalism. Ulster Third Way, which registered as a political party in February 2001, was the Northern Ireland branch of the UK-wide Third Way, albeit with much stronger emphasis on the Northern Ireland question. Ulster Third Way contested the West Belfast parliamentary seat in the 2001 general election, although candidate and party leader David Kerr failed to attract much support.

Northern Irish independence is still seen by some members of society as a way of moving forward in terms of the political crisis that continues to haunt Northern Irish politics even today. Some economists and politicians see an independent state as viable but others believe that Northern Ireland would not survive unless it had the support of the United Kingdom or the Republic of Ireland. Although it is not supported by a political party, around 533,085 declared in the 2011 census to be Northern Irish. This identity does not mean they believe in independence, however in a poll based upon what the future policy for Northern Ireland should be, 15% of the poll voters were in favour of Northern Irish independence.

== Relationship to unionism ==
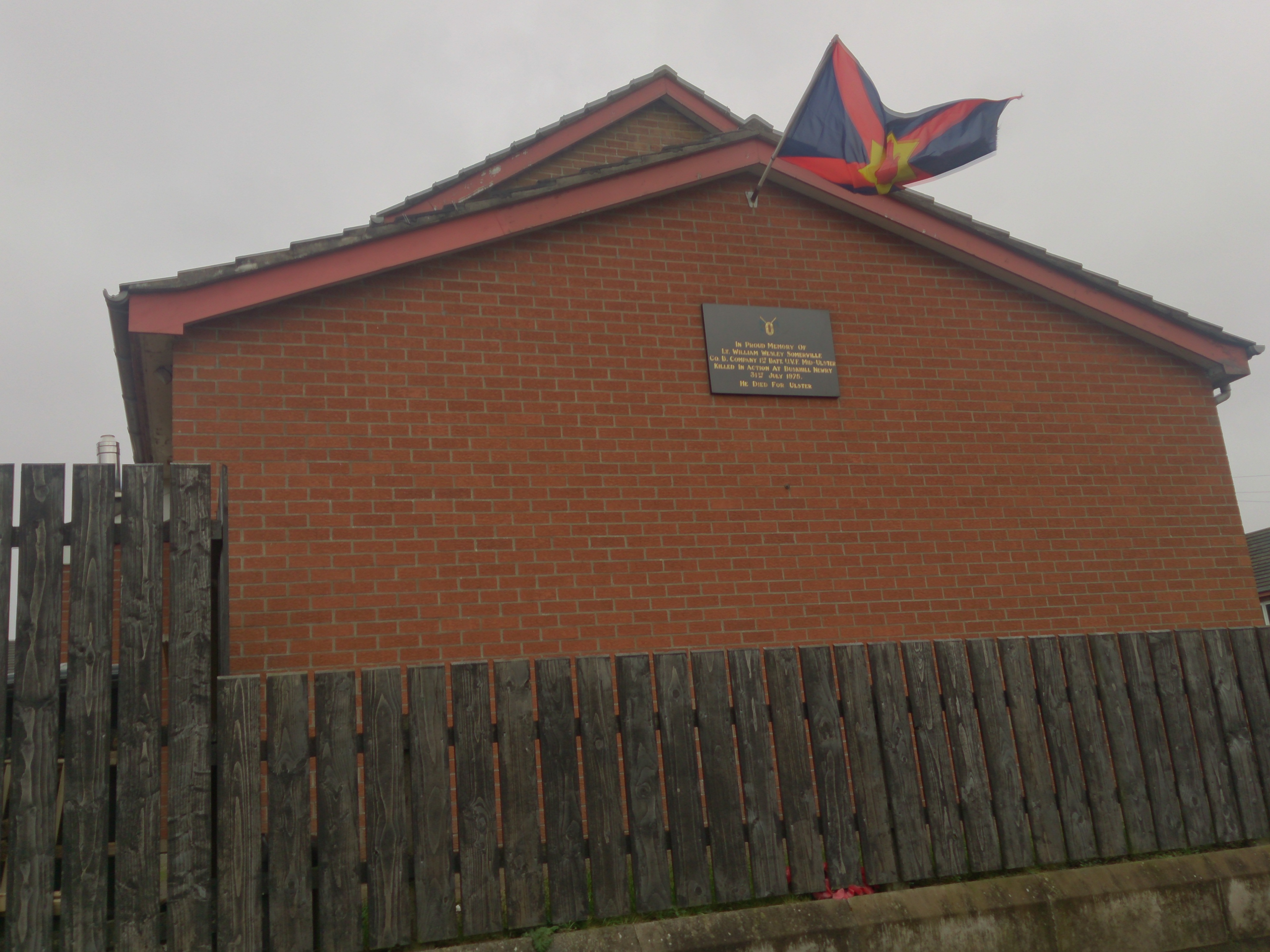
Ulster nationalist flag above a plaque in memory of Wesley Somerville in Moygashel

Ulster nationalism represents a reaction from within unionism to the perceived uncertainty of the future of the Union by the British government. Its leadership and members have all been unionists and have tended to react to what they viewed as crises surrounding the status of Northern Ireland as a part of the United Kingdom, such as the moves towards power-sharing in the 1970s or the Belfast Agreement of 1998, which briefly saw the UIM become a minor force. In such instances it has been considered preferable by the supporters of this ideological movement to remove the British dimension either partially (Commonwealth realm status) or fully (independence) to avoid a united Ireland.

However, whilst support for Ulster nationalism has tended to be reactive to political change, the theory also underlines the importance of Ulster cultural nationalism and the separate identity and culture of Ulster. As such, Ulster nationalist movements have been at the forefront of supporting the Orange Order and supporting contested 12 July marches as important parts of this cultural heritage, as well as encouraging the retention of the Ulster Scots dialects.

Outside traditional Protestant-focused Ulster nationalism, a non-sectarian independent Northern Ireland has sometimes been advocated as a solution to the conflict. Two notable proponents of this were the Scottish Marxist Tom Nairn and the Irish nationalist Liam de Paor.

== Parties ==
- Ulster Independence Party (1977-1982)
- Ulster Independence Movement (1988-2000)
- Ulster Third Way (U3W) (?-2005)

== See also ==
- Cornish nationalism
- English independence
- Scottish independence
- Two nations theory (Ireland)
- Unionism in Ireland
- Welsh independence
