= Ulster Independence Party =

Political party in Northern Ireland

The Ulster Independence Party was an Ulster nationalist political party.

The group was founded in October 1977 by the supporters of a document issued the previous year, Towards an Independent Ulster. The group initially claimed the support of the paramilitary Ulster Loyalist Central Co-ordinating Committee, but soon faded from view.

One of the party's leading members was John McKeague, who in 1979 became a founder and deputy leader of the Ulster Independence Association. McKeague was killed by the INLA in 1982, by which point the group appears to have been moribund.
