= Ulster-Scots Folk Orchestra =

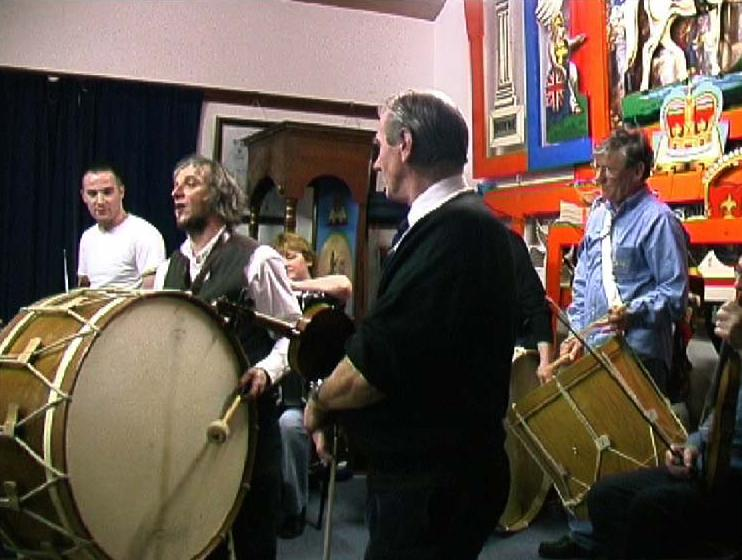
- Performing for Northern Ireland Hospice at Ballyrashane War Memorial Orange Hall, County Antrim
- Native name: Ulstèr-Scotch Fowk Orchéstrà
- Short name: USFO
- Founded: 2000

The Ulster-Scots Folk Orchestra (Ulster-Scots: Ulstèr-Scotch Fowk Orchéstrà, USFO) is a Northern Irish band of musicians who perform music from the Ulster-Scots tradition. Formed in 2000, the USFO are part of a revival of interest in Ulster Scots dialect and culture that developed during the 1990s. They are involved in community music-making, including gospel-singing, fiddling, piping, flute and accordion bands, drumming and fifing.

== History ==
The Ulster-Scots Folk Orchestra had its roots in Fowkgates (Ulster-Scots for "culture"), an artists' collective which was founded by Willie Drennan in 1999 to promote the Ulster-Scots tradition. A number of recordings were issued by Fowkgates in 1999, and the orchestra was formed in October 2000 and they held a concert in the Ulster Hall in early 2001. In the spring of the same year, they travelled to Atlanta to perform at a Scotch-Irish Symposium at Emory University.

Following their return to Ireland, they took part in an ethnomusicological workshop at the Irish World Music Centre at the University of Limerick in June 2001.

The USFO brought out their first album, Planet Ulster, later in 2001. A second album, Endangered Species, was released the following year. A further album, Bringin It Thegither, was released in late 2003. A fourth album, Somme, was released in 2006 to coincide with the 90th anniversary of the Battle of the Somme.

As the orchestra developed, it grew into a network of musicians, who come together in different combinations for different occasions. Although the name "orchestra" was deliberately chosen to suggest the size and diversity of instruments involved, the USFO operates as a loosely coordinated network of creative individuals, rather than in the structured and hierarchical manner of a classical orchestra.

A breakaway group, the "Ulster Scots eXperience", was formed in July 2005.

== Live ==
The USFO has performed at small community halls, outdoor festivals, and venues such as the Ulster Hall and Waterfront Hall where they were part of an Ulster-Scots programme for the BBC in 2004. They have also performed in Scotland, England, Ireland and the United States. Performances had covered material from Ulster-Scots language recitation and unaccompanied songs to contemporary songs accompanied by guitar and other instruments, to drum and fife tunes from both Orange and Hibernian sources. The USFO have also undertaken workshops at schools, community centres and festivals.

== Influences ==
The USFO were inspired by The Boys o Soorhill, a group of local traditional musicians active in the 1970s and 1980s. The album Endangered Species was dedicated to The Boys o Soorhill.

== USFO Youth Project ==
In 2004, the USFO Youth Project was initiated with the purpose of bringing young talent into the group. The association meets regularly for informal rehearsals in a loft in a farm near Ballymena.

== Discography ==
- Planet Ulster (2001)
- Endangered Species (2002)
- Bringin It Thegither (2003)
- Somme (2006)
