= Roy Magee =

Reverend Roy Magee
- Rev.Roy Magee
- Born: 30 January 1930; Belfast, Northern Ireland
- Died: 1 February 2009 (aged 79)
- Education: Magee College; Trinity College, Dublin
- Spouse: Maureen Reynolds
- Children: Two sons, one daughter
- Church: Presbyterian Church in Ireland
- Ordained: 1958
- Congregations served: Donaghcloney Presbyterian Church, Sinclair Seamen's Presbyterian Church; Saintfield Church; Dundonald Presbyterian Church
- Offices held: Chairman of the Ulster Vanguard
- Title: Order of the British Empire

Reverend Robert James Magee OBE (3 January 1930 – 1 February 2009) was a Northern Irish Presbyterian minister who is credited with playing a leading role in delivering the Combined Loyalist Military Command (CLMC) ceasefire of 1994. Earlier Rev Magee had been a leading figure in Unionism.

== Early life ==
Magee was born in Belfast's Ballysillan district into a working-class family, with his father working as a fitter in a factory on the Falls Road. He attended Sunday school, although his family was not overtly religious, and it was not until Magee was a teenager that he became consumed by Christianity.

Having worked in a number of roles for Mackie's industrial machinery manufacturers, Magee left work to attend first Magee College and then Trinity College, Dublin. He graduated and became a minister in the Presbyterian Church in 1958. As a minister Magee garnered a reputation for "fire and brimstone" preaching.

== Unionist activism ==
Magee was a member of the hard-line Ulster Vanguard during the early 1970s. Magee claimed that he joined the group after seeing "awful atrocities being perpetrated by the IRA" and felt that the Vanguard could be a rallying point to unite Unionism. He even served as chairman of this organisation. However Magee left the Vanguard after its leader Bill Craig decided to reconstitute it as a political party separate from the Ulster Unionist Party, thus killing Magee's hopes of it being a unifying force.

Following the signing of the Anglo-Irish Agreement Magee returned to political activism, becoming an outspoken critic of the deal. At the Ulster Says No rally against the Agreement at Belfast City Hall Magee was one of the figures to join Jim Molyneaux and Ian Paisley on the platform.

== Towards ceasefire ==
Magee had come into contact with the Ulster Defence Association (UDA) through a number of avenues, notably during the early 1970s when the nascent vigilante groups that made up the UDA worked alongside the Vanguard and later when UDA leader Andy Tyrie began to attend Magee's church. Magee ministered to a church in Dundonald whilst also working with the Farset Youth and Community Development group in the Greater Shankill area of west Belfast. Both roles brought Magee further into contact with loyalist paramilitaries in what are for the most part working-class Ulster loyalist area. He condemned the loyalist violence but also befriended a number of loyalists and sought to work alongside them to achieve peace, reasoning that Jesus "befriended sinners in order to redeem them".

In 1991 the CLMC called a ceasefire. Although this ultimately lasted only a very short time Magee was encouraged by the development and sought to work with the body to restore peace. Magee was also dealt with the British government and delivered messages between them and the loyalists, serving as the only conduit of information between the two for a time. Later, at the request of UDA leadership, Magee also put them in contact with Archibshop Robin Eames, the Primate of the Church of Ireland, who also liaised between the government and the UDA. As an individual Magee also had a direct line to Albert Reynolds and was able to report loyalist aims and grievances to the Taoiseach.

On 14 February 1992 he arranged a meeting with the organisation's ruling Inner Council at which the six brigadiers discussed the possibility of a ceasefire with Magee, Godfrey Brown and Jack Weir, the latter both former moderators of the Presbyterian Church. The meeting accomplished little but Magee kept contact with the UDA open.

Magee's main point of contact was Ray Smallwoods and the two kept in regular touch, although Magee considered ending all contact following the October 1993 Greysteel massacre, the random nature of which disgusted him. He informed the Inner Council that he was finished with them but they pleaded for him to keep the contact open. Magee eventually decided to keep open his contact with Smallwoods and later credited the Ulster Democratic Party leader as "one of the key people who saw the necessity to end it all".

Magee worked closely with Chris Hudson, a Dublin trade unionist who liaised with the Ulster Volunteer Force (UVF) on similar levels to Magee did with the UDA. Nonetheless, Magee had links to some UVF figures, notably Gusty Spence whom Magee introduced to a number of leading Republic of Ireland business figures just before the ceasefire. The ceasefire was announced at Fernhill House on 13 October 1994 when Spence read out a statement from the CLMC flanked by Progressive Unionist Party colleagues Jim McDonald and William "Plum" Smith and Ulster Democratic Party members Gary McMichael, John White and Davy Adams.

== Subsequent activity ==
Magee served on the Parades Commission and was also a senior research Fellow of the University of Ulster, having retired as an active minister in 1995. His efforts in peace-making saw him receive a number of awards, notably the Tipperary International Peace Award in 1995, the Peace Activist Award from the Tanenbaum Center for Interreligious Understanding and, in 1998, the post of honorary grand marshal of the St Patrick's Day parade in Dublin. He received the Order of the British Empire in 2004. He finally left the Parades Commission for good in 2006.

During the 2000 loyalist feud between the UVF and the Loyalist Volunteer Force John White asked Magee to mediate between the warring factions. However the UVF, who wanted to go on the offensive, rejected the proposal out of hand.

Magee died in 2009 after battling Parkinson's disease. He was married to Maureen Reynolds and had two sons and a daughter, with his wife and one son dying before him.
