= Hume–Adams dialogue =

The Hume–Adams dialogue was a series of talks between then Social Democratic and Labour Party leader John Hume and Sinn Féin leader Gerry Adams during the Northern Ireland peace process.

Following the Hume–Adams dialogue, Sinn Féin took part in the Northern Ireland peace process which led to the Provisional IRA ceasefires of 1994 and 1997 and the Good Friday Agreement of 1998.

== See also ==
- Good Friday Agreement
