= Third Way (British organisation) =

- Leader: Patrick Harrington
- Founder: Patrick Harrington
- Founded: 17 March 1990
- Dissolved: 2006 (as political party)
- Ideology: Anti-capitalism; Anti-communism; Euroscepticism; Third position
- Regional affiliation: Ulster Third Way (formerly)
- Colours: Green

The Third Way is a think tank and former political party in the United Kingdom, founded on the 17 March 1990. Third Way has supported a system of federalism for the UK with the possibility of a future break-up, an isolationist foreign policy, environmentalism, the wide use of Swiss-style citizens' initiatives and distributism.

It should not be confused with the Third Way ideology promoted by Tony Blair, Bill Clinton and Gerhard Schröder, which it condemns as a revised form of social democracy. It is not related to the Christian Third Way magazine.

== Ideology ==
Third Way describes itself as:

a think-tank dedicated to creating a society based on Justice, Community and Individual freedom against one that is based on Greed, Globalisation and Tyranny.

Third Way stands against all forms of social injustice, racism and religious bigotry. Third Way is for everyone. We promote positive ideas and apart from this website also publish printed material. We advocate Direct Democracy along Swiss lines using referenda and citizens’ initiatives.

We support small business and co-operative ownership.

The former Northern Ireland wing of the party, Ulster Third Way (U3W) advocated for Northern Irish independence from both the UK and Republic of Ireland before its dissolution in 2005. U3W also supported the re-establishment of the Confederate States of America and neo-confederatism, although it is not clear if this opinion was shared with the rest of the Third Way.

== Leading members ==
- Patrick Harrington, founder. Harrington was a leader of the Official NF, a faction in the late 1980s of the fascist National Front. Harrington, with David Kerr and Graham Williamson, closed down the Official NF in March 1990 to form Third Way as a more socially liberal organisation.

== National Liberal party ==
In 1999, new electoral organisation the National Liberal Party was formed by Patrick Harrington and Graham Williamson and registered as National Liberal Party – The Third Way with the Electoral Commission. In the 2014 European elections, the National Liberal Party stood with 8 candidates in the London constituency, gaining 6,736 votes.

== See also ==
- List of think tanks in the United Kingdom
