= Culture of Ulster =

The flag of the Province of Ulster is often flown in Gaelic Athletic Association contexts

Ulster is one of the four provinces of Ireland. Due to large-scale plantations of people from Scotland and England during the 17th and 18th centuries, as well as decades of conflict in the 20th, Ulster has a unique culture, quite different from the rest of Ireland. As all of Northern Ireland lies within Ulster and comprises about 90% of its population, the culture of Northern Ireland is very similar to that of the whole of Ulster. In particular, the Ulster Scots, or Scots Irish identity is strong among descendants of the Plantation, notably in counties Antrim, Cavan, Donegal, and Down. There is also a thriving indigenous Gaelic culture, largely attributed to the GAA and Conradh na Gaeilge.

A large part of the culture comes from the loyal orders of Northern Ireland. The Orange Order host a number of parades, including The Twelfth. Orangemen are accompanied by marching bands, bannerettes and flag parties are a part of the demonstration. Other parades include the Royal Thirteenth and Black Saturday demonstrations hosted by the Royal Black Institution, as well as the Apprentice Boys of Derry hosting the Shutting of the Gates, Relief of Derry and an Easter Monday parade.

== Languages ==
Ulster English is the English-based dialect of most people in Ulster, including those in the two main cities. It represents a cross-over area between Ulster Scots and Hiberno-English. The dialect is currently encroaching on the Ulster Scots area, especially in the Belfast commuter belt, and may eventually consume it. Ulster Scots, also known as Ullans, Hiberno-Scots, or Scots-Irish, refers to the variety of Scots spoken in parts of Ulster.

Ulster Irish is the dialect of the Irish language spoken in Ulster. The only county in Ulster to include Gaeltacht regions today is County Donegal, so that the term Donegal Irish is often used synonymously. Because of historical connections with Ulster, the southern dialects of Scottish Gaelic and Manx share similarities with Ulster Irish.

Polish and Lithuanian are the most common foreign languages in Ulster.

== Sport ==
Ulster Rugby represents the province in the European Rugby Champions. Gaelic football GAA where teams play for county and all Ireland.

== Food and drink ==
A dish from Ulster is the Ulster fry, usually served at breakfast. Also across Ulster dishes are found containing seafood, especially salmon and trout from County Donegal and County Down.

A popular soft drink in Derry, parts of County Londonderry and parts of County Tyrone, as well as across County Donegal, is McDaid's Football Special, which is made in Ramelton.

A famous ice cream made in Ulster is Morelli's, which is made near Portrush. Mullin's Icecream, made near Kilrea in the east of County Londonderry, is another famous Ulster icecream. In the south east of the province, Newry boasts 'Timoney's' ice cream on Canal Street, Warrenpoint has the famed 'Genoa' and Rathfriland on the hill is fortunate to host Graham's.

A well-known sweet made in Ulster is Yellow Man, while a famous confectionery company is Oatfield Sweets Ltd., who were previously based in Letterkenny in County Donegal.

== Music ==
=== Song ===
Ulster Irish or Donegal Irish is exclusive to Ulster. Ulster Irish is very different, as is the old style of prose and songwriting. Whereas in other parts of Ireland songs tend to be structured, in Ulster songs are wider ranging in style. Counties Donegal and Antrim are well known for songs of speed, much like Donegal fiddle playing. It is unique in the sean-nós traditional in both tempo and in wording and is often more free in structure and ornamentation.

Notable Ulster singers and songwriters by historical area*:

- Mairéad Ní Mhaonaigh – Gaoth Dobhair, County Donegal
- Moya Brennan – Gaoth Dobhair, County Donegal
- Sarah Makem – Keady, County Armagh

* Historical area refers to the period of the traditional music the artist is known best for singing.

=== Fiddle ===
Ulster fiddle playing is distinct from the rest of Ireland in that it has been greatly influenced from neighbouring Scotland, in particular the Hebrides.

== See also ==
- Irish traditional music
- Irish language
- Ulster-Scots
- Scotch-Irish Americans
- Scotch-Irish Canadians
