= Ulster Independence Movement =

- Leader: Hugh Ross
- Founded: 17 November 1988
- Dissolved: January 2000 (as a political party)
- Preceded by: Ulster Clubs
- Succeeded by: Ulster Third Way
- Ideology: Ulster nationalism

The Ulster Independence Movement was an Ulster nationalist political party founded (as the Ulster Independence Committee) on 17 November 1988. The group emerged from the Ulster Clubs, after a series of 15 public meetings across Northern Ireland. Led by Hugh Ross, a Presbyterian minister from Dungannon, County Tyrone, the UIC sought to end what it saw as the tyranny of rule from London (and potentially Dublin) and instead set up an independent Northern Ireland.

== Early development ==
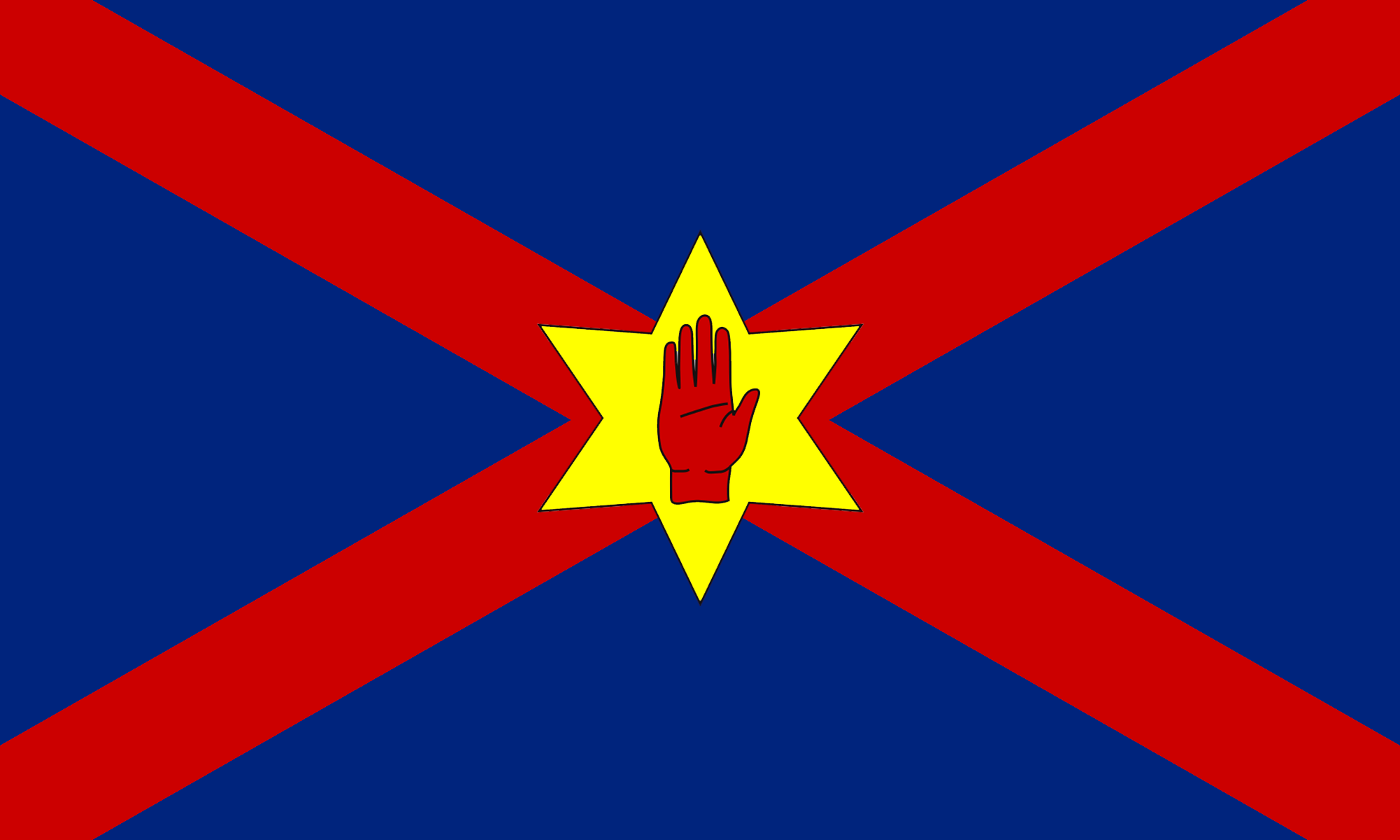
Ulster Independence flag of the Ulster Independence Movement

The UIC initially had a network of 11 branches and first entered the political arena in 1990 when Ross stood in a by-election for the Upper Bann constituency following the death of sitting MP Harold McCusker. Finishing as fourth out of eleven candidates with 1534 votes (4.3%) (and ahead of the Alliance Party of Northern Ireland candidate), the result indicated to the UIC that there was potential for an Ulster nationalist party.

The Committee reconstituted itself in 1994 as a full political party (largely as a reaction to the Downing Street Declaration), changing its name to the UIM and putting forward Ross as a candidate in the 1994 elections to the European Parliament (one of three pro-independence candidates to stand). Ross proved the most successful of the three, gaining 7,858 first preference votes (a 1.4% share) and retained his deposit. In the aftermath of this election a general meeting of pro-independence groups and individuals was organised by Ross after overtures were sent out to David Kerr, Robert Mooney (the other two Ulster nationalist candidates in the European election) and the Ballymena-based Ulster Party. Mooney did not turn up but Kerr and Agnes McLeister of the Ulster Party agreed to pool resources and join forces with Ross' movement.

== 1996 Forum election ==
Buoyed by the relative success of the previous election and the influx of new affiliates, the UIM put up 40 candidates in 18 seats in the Northern Ireland Forum elections of 1996, its most high-profile election campaign. With every seat contested as well as the regional list (which was headed by Ross) Kerr was placed as a candidate in North Belfast with McLeister in North Antrim, whilst other candidates who had or would go on to have a higher profile included Willie Frazer in Newry and Armagh (who subsequently organised Families Acting for Innocent Relatives and Love Ulster) and Kenny McClinton and Clifford Peeples in West Belfast (a pastor who was later jailed for possession of explosives).

Despite this higher profile campaign the UIM's vote dropped as parties directly associated with loyalist paramilitary groups, such as the Ulster Democratic Party and Progressive Unionist Party, began to win votes. Alongside this, the party was still not the only Ulster nationalist option, and finished behind Ulster's Independent Voice in North Belfast and Strangford, whilst beating them in West Belfast and tying exactly with them in North Down. The UIM polled 2125 votes (0.5%) across Northern Ireland and no representation was secured.

=== Results ===
| Constituency | Votes | % |
|---|---|---|
| Belfast East | 114 | 0.3 |
| Belfast North | 41 | 0.1 |
| Belfast South | 108 | 0.3 |
| Belfast West | 43 | 0.1 |
| East Antrim | 86 | 0.3 |
| North Antrim | 167 | 0.4 |
| South Antrim | 89 | 0.2 |
| North Down | 49 | 0.1 |
| South Down | 130 | 0.3 |
| Fermanagh and South Tyrone | 189 | 0.4 |
| Foyle | 65 | 0.1 |
| Lagan Valley | 164 | 0.4 |
| East Londonderry | 100 | 0.3 |
| Mid Ulster | 263 | 0.6 |
| Newry and Armagh | 173 | 0.3 |
| Strangford | 57 | 0.1 |
| West Tyrone | 107 | 0.3 |
| Upper Bann | 180 | 0.4 |
| Regional list | 2,125 | 0.5 |

== Subsequent activity ==
Party activity continued after the signing of the Belfast Agreement, with the UIM playing a role in the unsuccessful 'No' campaign against it. The party fielded two candidates in the Northern Ireland Assembly of 1998 but failed to win a seat. Seeing their chances becoming increasingly diminished, the UIM formally abandoned their role as a political party in January 2000 and instead reconstituted as a 'ginger group'. This came in the wake of a Channel 4 programme, "The Committee", which alleged links between the UIM and loyalist killings, allegations that damaged their credibility and saw a number of members leave the group.

The UIM is all but dead now, even as a think tank, although some of its former members have continued as members of the Ulster Third Way.
