= Ulster Third Way =

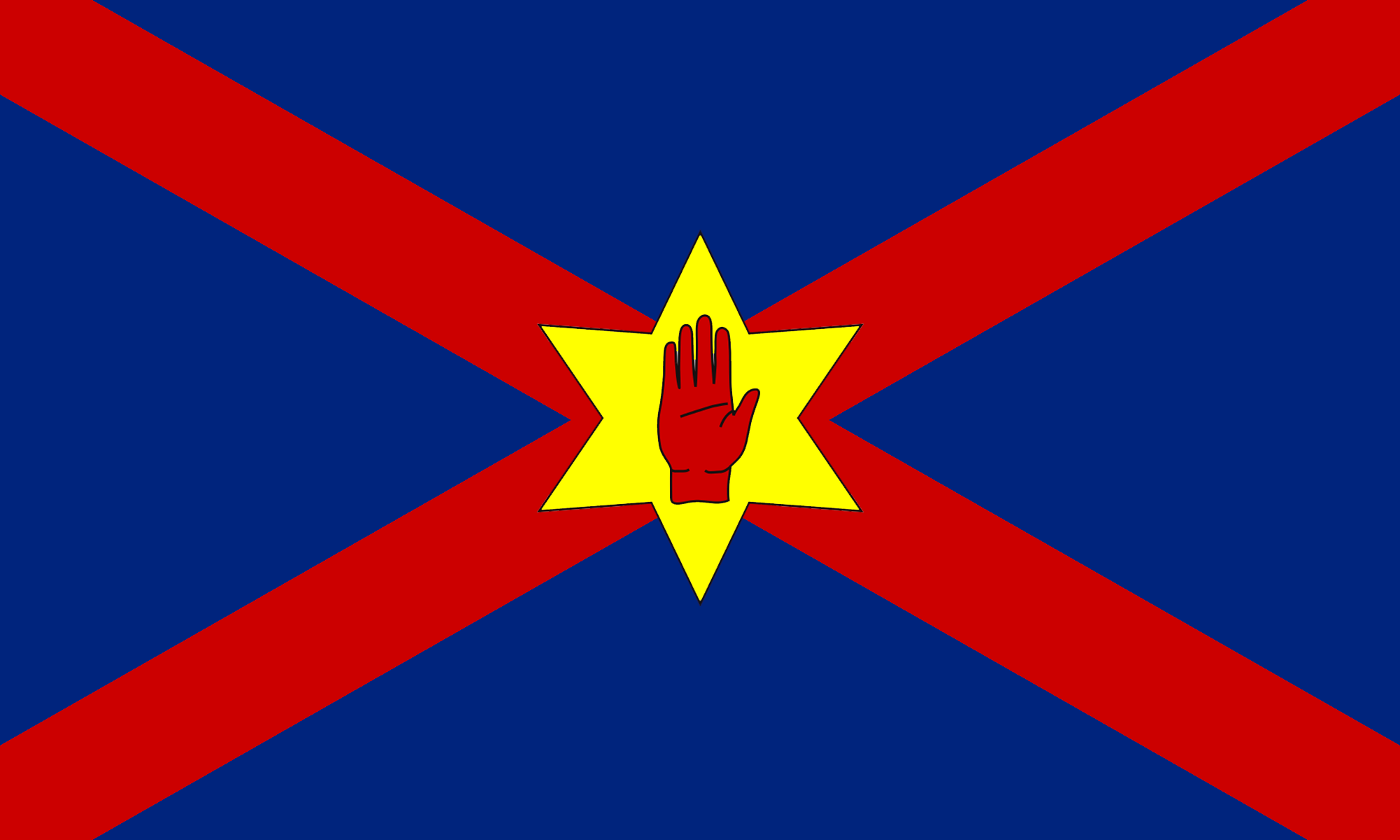
- Chairman: David Kerr
- Founded: Unknown
- Dissolved: de-registered 2005
- Headquarters: Shankill Road, Belfast, Northern Ireland
- Newspaper: Ulster Nation
- Ideology: Ulster nationalism National liberalism Euroscepticism
- National affiliation: Third Way
- Colours: Purple, Blue

Website
- Ulster Nation webpage

The Ulster Third Way was the Northern Ireland branch of the Third Way and was organised by David Kerr, who had previously campaigned as an 'independent Unionist' (chairing the small North Belfast Independent Unionist Association) as well as for the British National Front. It followed an Ulster nationalist ideology.

== Policies ==
As well as sharing the Third Way's aims U3W (as it is sometimes shortened to) was committed to securing independence for Northern Ireland from both the United Kingdom and Ireland. U3W tended to focus its attentions on trying to build up grass-roots support in loyalist areas, emphasising Ulster-Scots and the Battle of the Boyne commemorations and has its main office in the Shankill area of Belfast. It advocated the creation of an "all-Northern Ireland" identity as a basis for independence and as a solution to the Troubles. During the 1990s it also advocated Protestants learning the Irish language. Despite concentrating its efforts on the Protestant community U3W remained a very minor force in Northern Irish politics.

The group published a journal Ulster Nation, as well as irregular books and pamphlets about Ulster nationalism. The group compared its aims with those of Neo-Confederates in the Southern United States and declared its support for the re-establishment of the Confederate States of America. However, in an interview conducted for Cornell University in 2003 Kerr confirmed that, despite the group taking this position, U3W had established no formal links with any Neo-Confederate groups.

== Elections ==
The party largely confined its activities to the Belfast West constituency, campaigning only there in the 2001 general election (with Kerr winning 116 votes for a 0.3% share). As well as in the west of Belfast U3W also offered candidates in north Belfast in the 2001 local elections. The unsuccessful 2001 campaign was conducted entirely online by the party. Kerr represented the party in West Belfast again in the 2003 assembly election. The 16 votes the party captured in that election were the lowest province-wide.

As leader of the group Kerr was also a candidate in the 1994 European election for the single Northern Ireland constituency under the title "Independent Ulster", capturing 578 votes (0.1%) to finish 14th out of 17 candidates. Kerr also served as a candidate for the larger Ulster Independence Movement.

== Deregistration ==
The party deregistered on 8 December 2005. The name "National Liberal Party Ulster Third Way" was registered by the UK's National Liberal Party, a group closely linked to Third Way.
