= A Shared Future =

Consultation document on Northern Ireland

A Shared Future – Policy and Strategic Framework for Good Relations in Northern Ireland is a consultation document on Northern Ireland launched by John Spellar on 21 March 2005, then junior minister at the Northern Ireland Office.

This policy document was formulated to address community divisions, segregation, and sectarianism in Northern Ireland. A Shared Future warns about society in Northern Ireland becoming increasingly polarized. It advocates for “sharing over separation” and a “cultural variety” rather than the existence of a variety of separated cultures. The document proposes several strategies for approaching this issue and creating a shared society.
