= Public Eye =

Public Eye or The Public Eye may refer to:

== Organizations and journalism ==
- Public Eye (organization), a Switzerland-based group promoting respect for human rights and the environment in poor countries
  - Public Eye on Davos, an award given ironically to corporations deemed most harmful to society
- Public Eye Network, an American progressive investigative group founded in the 1970s
  - The Public Eye (magazine), an investigative magazine founded by the Public Eye Network in 1977

== Film and television ==
=== Film ===
- Follow Me! (film), or The Public Eye (U.S.), a 1972 British comedy-drama film
- The Public Eye (film), a 1992 American neo-noir film

=== Television ===
- Public Eye (TV series), a 1965–1975 British drama series
- The Public Eye (TV series), a 1965–1969 Canadian public affairs series
- Public Eye with Bryant Gumbel, a 1997–1998 American news magazine program
- "The Public Eye" (Dollhouse), a 2009 TV episode

== Other uses ==
- Public Eye (album), a 1991 album by Roy Hargrove
- The Public Eye, a 1962 play by Peter Shaffer
