= Far-right politics =

Political alignment in the right-wing spectrum

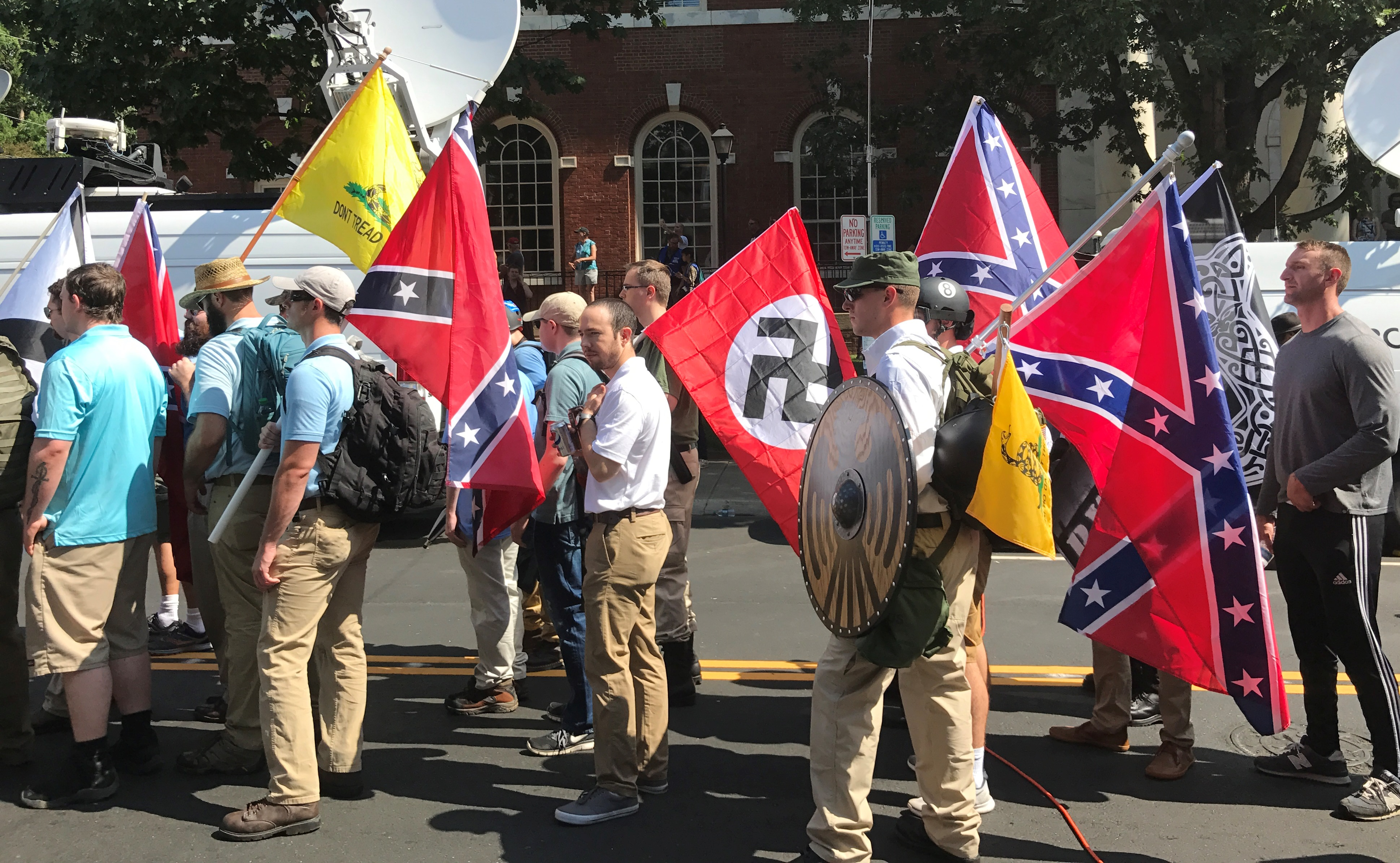
Alt-right members preparing at the 2017 Unite the Right rally in Charlottesville, Virginia. Participants are carrying Gadsden flags, a Nazi flag, and Confederate battle flags.

Far-right politics (Note: Also known as extreme right politics or right-wing extremism) are politics further to the right on the political spectrum than the standard political right. Far-right politics encompass a range of ideologies that are marked by ultraconservatism, ultranationalism, (Note: Many far-right politics, there are cases where ethnic nationalist or nativist elements are prominent, but not all ethnic nationalism does not appear only in political right; some far-right ideologies are characterized by state nationalism—a form of authoritarian civic nationalism—marked by imperialist or anti-leftist elements (ex: Integral nationalism, Kokkashugi, Putinism, etc.).) authoritarianism, and radical anti-communism.

This part of the political spectrum is on the far end of the right, distinguished from more mainstream right-wing ideologies by its emphasis on postliberalist and exclusivist views or opposition to liberal democracy. Far-right ideologies have historically included reactionary conservatism, fascism, and Nazism, while contemporary manifestations also incorporate neo-fascism, neo-Nazism, supremacism, and various other movements characterized by chauvinism, xenophobia, and theocratic or reactionary beliefs. Far-right terrorism consists of extremist, militant, or insurgent groups that attempt to realise their ideals through political violence rather than using democratic processes.

Key to the far-right worldview is the notion of societal purity, often invoking ideas of a homogeneous community based on cultural, ethnic, national, racial, or religious lines or a combination of them. This view generally promotes organicism, which perceives society as a unified, natural entity under threat from diversity or modern pluralism. Far-right movements frequently target perceived threats to their idealized community, whether racial, ethnic, religious, or cultural, leading to anti-immigrant sentiments, welfare chauvinism, and, in extreme cases, political violence or oppression. According to political theorists, the far right appeals to those who believe in maintaining strict cultural and ethnic divisions and a return to traditional social hierarchies and values.

In practice, far-right movements differ widely by region and historical context. In Western Europe, they have often focused on anti-immigration and anti-globalism, while in Eastern Europe, strong anti-communist rhetoric is more common. The United States has seen a unique evolution of far-right movements that emphasize nativism and radical opposition to an increasingly centralized federal government.

Far-right politics have often led to oppression, political violence, forced assimilation, ethnic cleansing, and genocide against groups of people based on their supposed inferiority or their perceived threat to the native ethnic group, nation, state, national religion, dominant culture, or conservative social institutions. Across these contexts, far-right politics has continued to influence discourse, occasionally achieving electoral success and prompting significant debate over its place in democratic societies.

== Overview ==
=== Concept and worldview ===
According to scholars Jean-Yves Camus and Nicolas Lebourg, the core of the far right's worldview is organicism, the idea that society functions as a complete, organized, and homogeneous living being. Adapted to the community they wish to constitute or reconstitute (whether based on ethnicity, nationality, religion or race), the concept leads them to reject every form of universalism in favor of autophilia and alterophobia, or in other words the idealization of a "we" excluding a "they". The far right tends to absolutize differences between nations, races, individuals, or cultures since they disrupt their efforts towards the utopian dream of the "closed" and naturally organized society, perceived as the condition to ensure the rebirth of a community finally reconnected to its quasi-eternal nature and re-established on firm metaphysical foundations.

As they view their community in a state of decay facilitated by the ruling elites, far-right members portray themselves as a natural, sane and alternative elite, with the redemptive mission of saving society from its promised doom. They reject both their national political system and the global geopolitical order (including their institutions and values, e.g. political liberalism and egalitarian humanism) which are presented as needing to be abandoned or purged of their impurities, so that the "redemptive community" can eventually leave the current phase of liminal crisis to usher in the new era. The community itself is idealized through great archetypal figures (the Golden Age, the savior, decadence and global conspiracy theories) as they glorify non-rationalistic and non-materialistic values such as the youth or the cult of the dead.

Political scientist Cas Mudde argues that the far right can be viewed as a combination of four broadly defined concepts, namely exclusivism (e.g. racism, xenophobia, ethnocentrism, ethnopluralism, chauvinism, including welfare chauvinism), anti-democratic and non-individualist traits (e.g. cult of personality, hierarchism, monism, populism, anti-particracy, an organicist view of the state), a traditionalist value system lamenting the disappearance of historic frames of reference (e.g. law and order, the family, the ethnic, linguistic and religious community and nation as well as the natural environment) and a socioeconomic program associating corporatism, state control of certain sectors, agrarianism, and a varying degree of belief in the free play of socially Darwinistic market forces. Mudde then proposes a subdivision of the far-right nebula into moderate and radical leanings, according to their degree of exclusionism and essentialism.

=== Definition and comparative analysis ===
The Encyclopedia of Politics: The Left and the Right states that far-right politics include "persons or groups who hold extreme nationalist, xenophobic, homophobic, racist, religious fundamentalist, or other reactionary views". While the term far right is typically applied to fascists and neo-Nazis, it has also been used to refer to those to the right of mainstream right-wing politics.

According to political scientist Lubomír Kopeček, "[t]he best working definition of the contemporary far right may be the four-element combination of nationalism, xenophobia, law and order, and welfare chauvinism proposed for the Western European environment by Cas Mudde." Relying on those concepts, far-right politics includes yet is not limited to aspects of authoritarianism, anti-communism, and nativism. Claims that superior people should have greater rights than inferior people are often associated with the far right, as they have historically favored a social Darwinistic or elitist hierarchy based on the belief in the legitimacy of the rule of a supposedly superior minority over the inferior masses. Regarding the socio-cultural dimension of nationality, culture and migration, one far-right position is the view that certain ethnic, racial, or religious groups should stay separate, based on the belief that the interests of one's own group should be prioritized.

In Western Europe, far-right parties have been associated with anti-immigrant policies, as well as opposition to globalism and European integration. They often make nationalist and xenophobic appeals which make allusions to ethnic nationalism rather than civic nationalism (or liberal nationalism). Some have at their core illiberal policies, such as removing checks on executive authority, and protections for minorities from majority (multipluralism). In the 1990s, the "winning formula" was often to attract anti-immigrant blue collar workers and white collar workers who wanted less state intervention in the economy, but in the 2000s, this switched to welfare chauvinism.

In comparing the Western European and post-Communist Central European far-right, Kopeček writes that "[t]he Central European far right was also typified by a strong anti-Communism, much more markedly than in Western Europe", allowing for "a basic ideological classification within a unified party family, despite the heterogeneity of the far right parties". Kopeček concludes that a comparison of Central European far-right parties with those of Western Europe shows that "these four elements are present in Central Europe as well, though in a somewhat modified form, despite differing political, economic, and social influences." In the American and more general Anglo-Saxon environment, the most common term is "radical right", which has a broader meaning than the European radical right. Mudde defines the American radical right as an "old school of nativism, populism, and hostility to central government [which] was said to have developed into the post-World War II combination of ultranationalism and anti-communism, Christian fundamentalism, militaristic orientation, and anti-alien sentiment".

Jodi Dean argues that "the rise of far-right anti-communism in many parts of the world" should be interpreted "as a politics of fear, which utilizes the disaffection and anger generated by capitalism. [...] Partisans of far right-wing organizations, in turn, use anti-communism to challenge every political current which is not embedded in a clearly exposed nationalist and racist agenda. For them, both the USSR and the European Union, leftist liberals, ecologists, and supranational corporations – all of these may be called 'communist' for the sake of their expediency."

In Hate in the Homeland: The New Global Far Right, Cynthia Miller-Idriss examines the far right as a global movement and representing a cluster of overlapping "antidemocratic, antiegalitarian, white supremacist" beliefs that are "embedded in solutions like authoritarianism, ethnic cleansing or ethnic migration, and the establishment of separate ethno-states or enclaves along racial and ethnic lines".

== Modern debates ==
=== Terminology ===
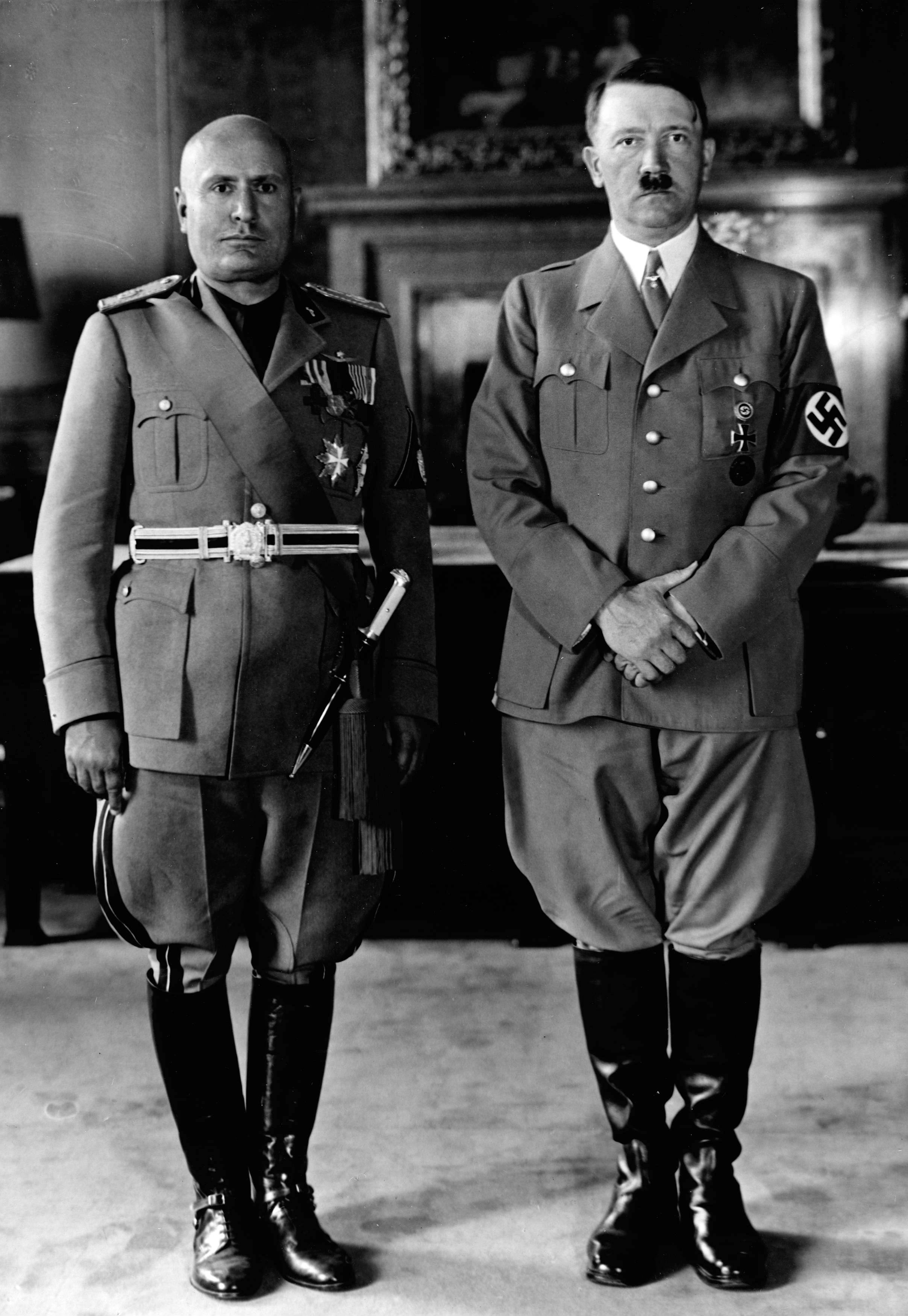
Benito Mussolini, dictator of Fascist Italy (left), and Adolf Hitler, dictator of Nazi Germany (right), were fascist leaders.

According to Jean-Yves Camus and Nicolas Lebourg, the modern ambiguities in the definition of far-right politics lie in the fact that the concept is generally used by political adversaries to "disqualify and stigmatize all forms of partisan nationalism by reducing them to the historical experiments of Italian Fascism [and] German National Socialism". Mudde agrees and notes that "the term is not only used for scientific purposes but also for political purposes. Several authors define right-wing extremism as a sort of anti-thesis against their own beliefs." While the existence of such a political position is widely accepted among scholars, figures associated with the far-right rarely accept this denomination, preferring terms like "national movement" or "national right". There is also debate about how appropriate the labels neo-fascist or neo-Nazi are. In the words of Mudde, "the labels Neo-Nazi and to a lesser extent neo-Fascism are now used exclusively for parties and groups that explicitly state a desire to restore the Third Reich or quote historical National Socialism as their ideological influence."

According to Léonie de Jonge the term "far right", as used generally among political scientists, is an umbrella term which encompasses the theoretically distinct "radical right" and "extreme right". One issue is whether parties should be labelled radical or extreme, a distinction that is made by the Federal Constitutional Court of Germany when determining whether or not a party should be banned. (Note: Mudde 2002, p. 12: "Simply stated, the difference between radicalism and extremism is that the former is verfassungswidrig (opposed to the constitution), whereas the latter is verfassungsfeindlich (hostile towards the constitution). This difference is of the utmost practical importance for the political parties involved, as extremist parties are extensively watched by the (federal and state) Verfassungsschutz and can even be banned, whereas radical parties are free from this control.") Within the broader family of the far right, the extreme right is revolutionary, opposing popular sovereignty and majority rule, and sometimes supporting violence, whereas the radical right is reformist, accepting free elections, but opposing fundamental elements of liberal democracy such as minority rights, rule of law, or separation of powers.

After a survey of the academic literature, Mudde concluded in 2002 that the terms "right-wing extremism", "right-wing populism", "national populism", or "neo-populism" were often used as synonyms by scholars (or, nonetheless, terms with "striking similarities"), except notably among a few authors studying the extremist-theoretical tradition. (Note: Mudde 2002, p. 13: "All in all, most definitions of (whatever) populism do not differ that much in content from the definitions of right-wing extremism. [...] When the whole range of different terms and definitions used in the field is surveyed, there are striking similarities, with the various terms often being used synonymously and without any clear intention. Only a few authors, most notably those working within the extremist-theoretical tradition, clearly distinguish between the various terms.")

=== Relation to right-wing politics ===
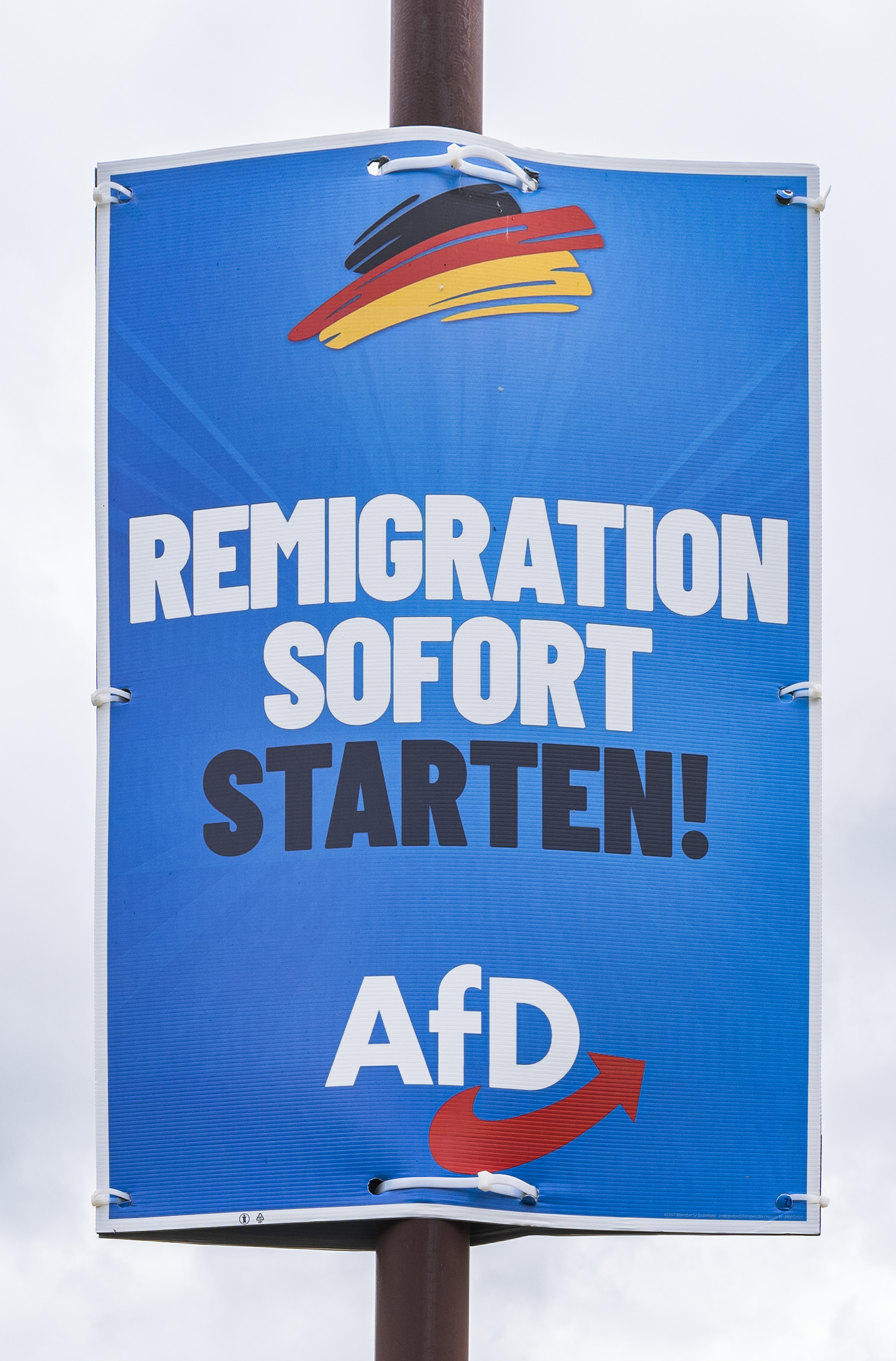
Election poster of the far-right Alternative for Germany with a statement saying "Start remigration immediately!" in the 2024 Thuringian state election

Italian philosopher and political scientist Norberto Bobbio argues that attitudes towards equality are primarily what distinguish left-wing politics from right-wing politics on the political spectrum: "the left considers the key inequalities between people to be artificial and negative, which should be overcome by an active state, whereas the right believes that inequalities between people are natural and positive, and should be either defended or left alone by the state."

Aspects of far-right ideology can be identified in the agenda of some contemporary right-wing parties: in particular, the idea that superior persons should dominate society while undesirable elements should be purged, which in extreme cases has resulted in genocides. Charles Grant, director of the Centre for European Reform in London, distinguishes between fascism and right-wing nationalist parties which are often described as far right such as the National Front in France. Mudde notes that the most successful European far-right parties in 2019 were "former mainstream right-wing parties that have turned into populist radical right ones". According to historian Mark Sedgwick, "[t]here is no general agreement as to where the mainstream ends and the extreme starts, and if there ever had been agreement on this, the recent shift in the mainstream would challenge it."

Proponents of the horseshoe theory interpretation of the left–right political spectrum identify the far left and the far right as having more in common with each other as extremists than each of them has with centrists or moderates. This theory has received criticism, including the argument that it has been centrists who have supported far-right and fascist regimes over socialist ones.

=== Nature of support ===
Jens Rydgren describes a number of theories as to why individuals support far-right political parties and the academic literature on this topic distinguishes between demand-side theories that have changed the "interests, emotions, attitudes and preferences of voters" and supply-side theories which focus on the programmes of parties, their organization and the opportunity structures within individual political systems. The most common demand-side theories are the social breakdown thesis, the relative deprivation thesis, the modernization losers thesis and the ethnic competition thesis.

The rise of far-right parties has also been viewed as a rejection of post-materialist values on the part of some voters. This theory which is known as the reverse post-material thesis blames both left-wing and progressive parties for embracing a post-material agenda (including feminism and environmentalism) that alienates traditional working class voters. Another study argues that individuals who join far-right parties determine whether those parties develop into major political players or whether they remain marginalized.

Early academic studies adopted psychoanalytical explanations for the far right's support. The 1933 publication The Mass Psychology of Fascism by Wilhelm Reich argued the theory that fascists came to power in Germany as a result of sexual repression. For some far-right parties in Western Europe, the issue of immigration has become the dominant issue among them, so much so that some scholars refer to these parties as "anti-immigrant" parties.

== Intellectual history ==
=== Background ===
The French Revolution in 1789 created a major shift in political thought by challenging the established ideas supporting hierarchy with new ones about universal equality and freedom. The modern left–right political spectrum also emerged during this period. Democrats and proponents of universal suffrage were located on the left side of the elected French Assembly, while monarchists seated farthest to the right.

The strongest opponents of liberalism and democracy during the 19th century, such as Joseph de Maistre and Friedrich Nietzsche, were highly critical of the French Revolution. Those who advocated a return to the absolute monarchy during the 19th century called themselves "ultra-monarchists" and embraced a "mystic" and "providentialist" vision of the world where royal dynasties were seen as the "repositories of divine will". The opposition to liberal modernity was based on the belief that hierarchy and rootedness are more important than equality and liberty, with the latter two being dehumanizing.

=== Emergence ===
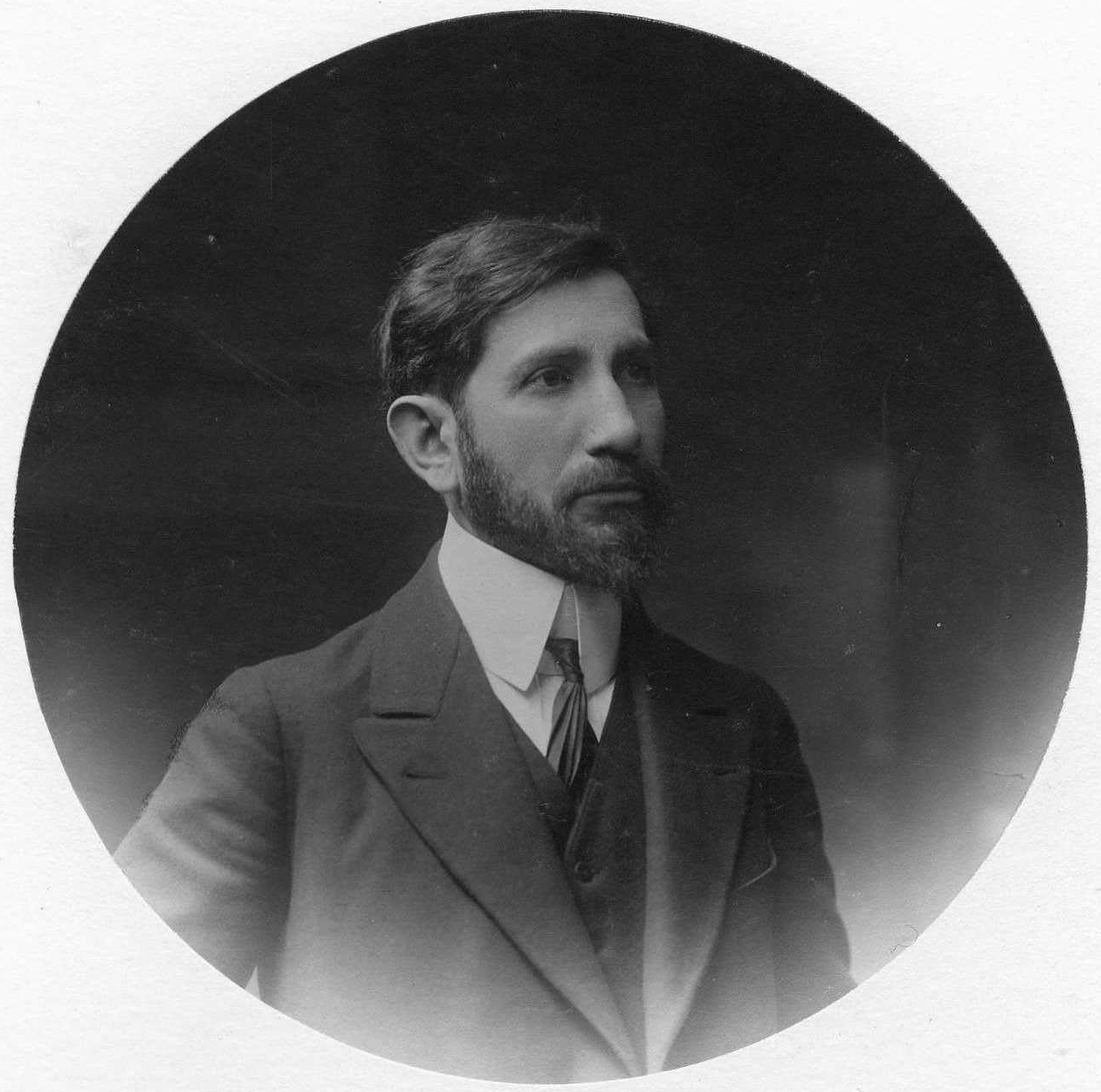
Charles Maurras, founder and leader of Action Française, a far-right monarchist and ultranationalist political movement in France

In the French public debate following the Bolshevik Revolution of 1917, far right was used to describe the strongest opponents of the far left, those who supported the events occurring in Russia. A number of thinkers on the far right nonetheless claimed an influence from an anti-Marxist and anti-egalitarian interpretation of socialism, based on a military comradeship that rejected Marxist class analysis, or what Oswald Spengler had called a "socialism of the blood", which is sometimes described by scholars as a form of "socialist revisionism". They included Charles Maurras, Benito Mussolini, Arthur Moeller van den Bruck and Ernst Niekisch. Those thinkers eventually split along nationalist lines from the original communist movement, Karl Marx and Friedrich Engels contradicting nationalist theories with the idea that "the working men [had] no country." The main reason for that ideological confusion can be found in the consequences of the Franco-Prussian War of 1870, which according to Swiss historian Philippe Burrin had completely redesigned the political landscape in Europe by diffusing the idea of an anti-individualistic concept of "national unity" rising above the right and left division.

As the concept of "the masses" was introduced into the political debate through industrialization and the universal suffrage, a new right-wing founded on national and social ideas began to emerge, what Zeev Sternhell has called the "revolutionary right" and a foreshadowing of fascism. The rift between the left and nationalists was furthermore accentuated by the emergence of anti-militarist and anti-patriotic movements like anarchism or syndicalism, which shared even fewer similarities with the far right. The latter began to develop a "nationalist mysticism" entirely different from that on the left, and antisemitism turned into a credo of the far right, marking a break from the traditional economic "anti-Judaism" defended by parts of the far left, in favor of a racial and pseudo-scientific notion of alterity. Various nationalist leagues began to form across Europe like the Pan-German League or the Ligue des Patriotes, with the common goal of a uniting the masses beyond social divisions.

=== Völkisch and revolutionary right ===
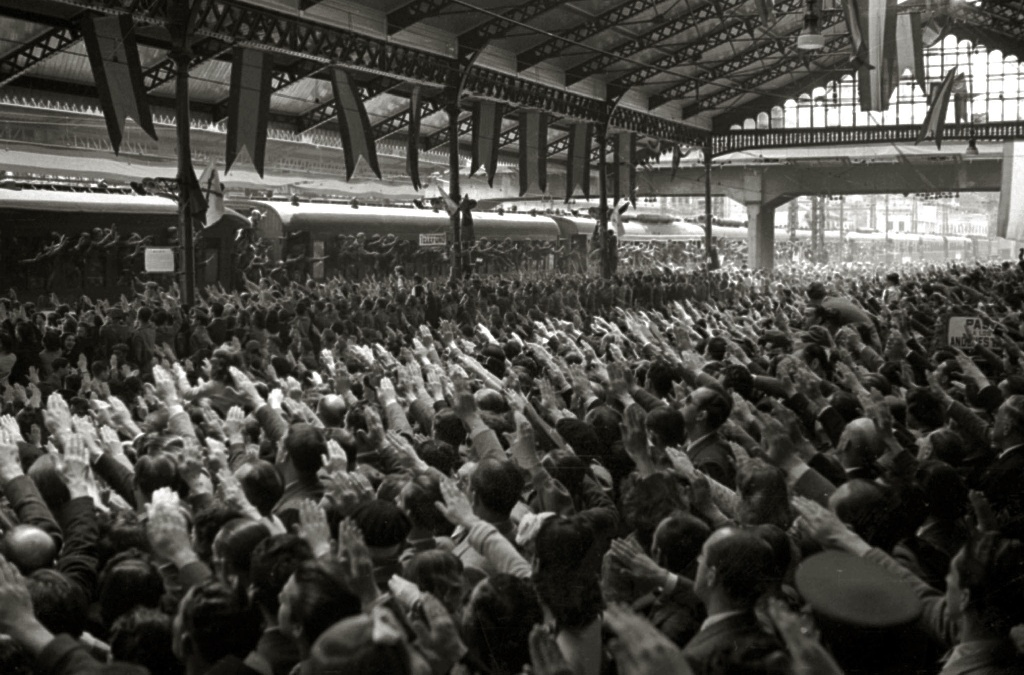
Spanish Falangist volunteer forces of the Blue Division entrain at San Sebastián, 1942

The Völkisch movement emerged in the late 19th century, drawing inspiration from German Romanticism and its fascination for a medieval Reich supposedly organized into a harmonious hierarchical order. Erected on the idea of "blood and soil", it was a racialist, populist, agrarian, romantic nationalist and an antisemitic movement from the 1900s onward as a consequence of a growing exclusive and racial connotation. They idealized the myth of an "original nation", that still could be found at their times in the rural regions of Germany, a form of "primitive democracy freely subjected to their natural elites". Thinkers led by Arthur de Gobineau, Houston Stewart Chamberlain, Alexis Carrel and Georges Vacher de Lapouge distorted Darwin's theory of evolution to advocate a "race struggle" and an hygienist vision of the world. The purity of the bio-mystical and primordial nation theorized by the Völkischen then began to be seen as corrupted by foreign elements, Jewish in particular.

Translated in Maurice Barrès' concept of "the earth and the dead", these ideas influenced the pre-fascist "revolutionary right" across Europe. The latter had its origin in the fin de siècle intellectual crisis and it was, in the words of Fritz Stern, the deep "cultural despair" of thinkers feeling uprooted within the rationalism and scientism of the modern world. It was characterized by a rejection of the established social order, with revolutionary tendencies and anti-capitalist stances, a populist and plebiscitary dimension, the advocacy of violence as a means of action and a call for individual and collective palingenesis ("regeneration, rebirth").

=== Contemporary thought ===
The key thinkers of contemporary far-right politics are claimed by Mark Sedgwick to share four key elements, namely apocalyptism, fear of global elites, belief in Carl Schmitt's friend–enemy distinction and the idea of metapolitics. The apocalyptic strain of thought begins in Oswald Spengler's The Decline of the West and is shared by Julius Evola and Alain de Benoist. It continues in The Death of the West by Pat Buchanan as well as in fears over Islamization of Europe. Ernst Jünger was concerned about rootless cosmopolitan elites while de Benoist and Buchanan oppose the managerial state and Curtis Yarvin is against "the Cathedral". Schmitt's friend–enemy distinction has inspired the French Nouvelle Droite idea of ethnopluralism.

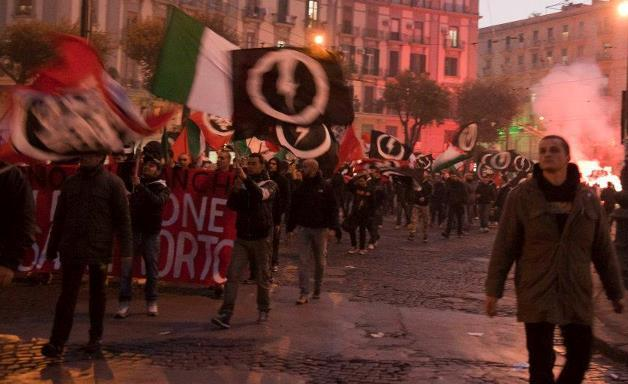
CasaPound rally in Naples

In a 1961 book deemed influential in the European far-right at large, French neo-fascist writer Maurice Bardèche introduced the idea that fascism could survive the 20th century under a new metapolitical guise adapted to the changes of the times. Rather than trying to revive doomed regimes with their single party, secret police or public display of Caesarism, Bardèche argued that its theorists should promote the core philosophical idea of fascism regardless of its framework, i.e. the concept that only a minority, "the physically saner, the morally purer, the most conscious of national interest", can represent best the community and serve the less gifted in what Bardèche calls a new "feudal contract".

Another influence on contemporary far-right thought has been the Traditionalist School, which included Julius Evola, and has influenced Steve Bannon and Aleksandr Dugin, advisors to Donald Trump and Vladimir Putin as well as the Jobbik party in Hungary.

== International organizations ==
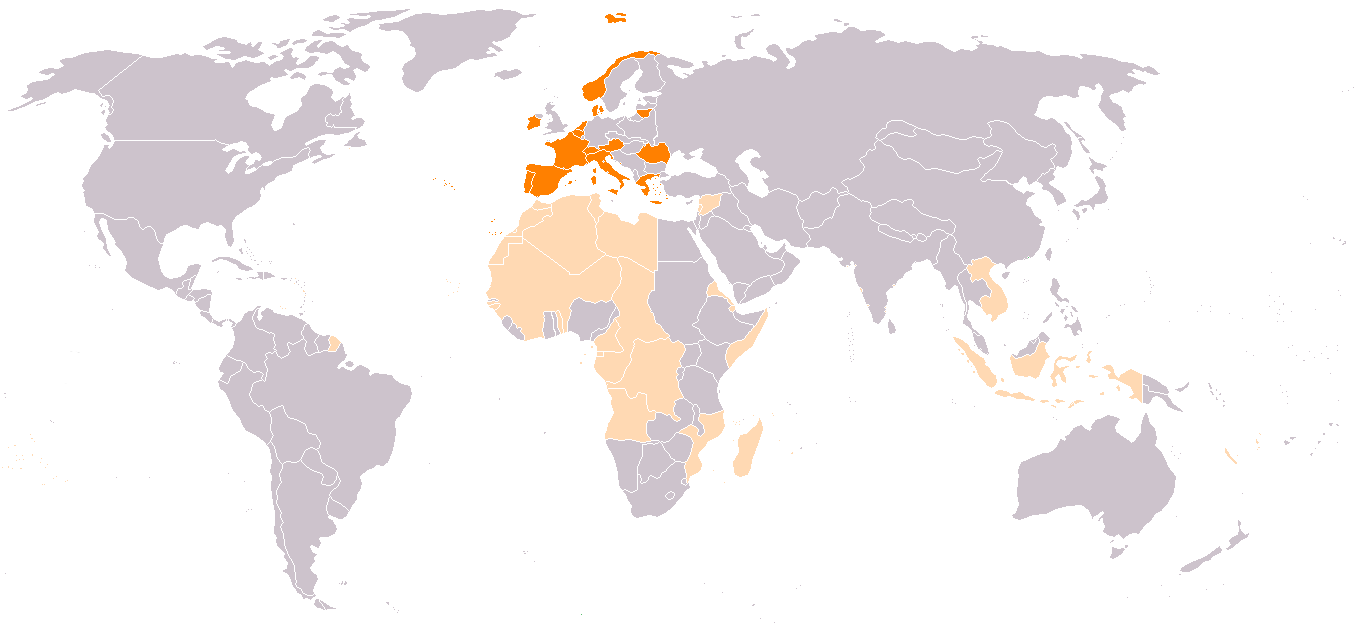
National origins of Fascist International Congress participants in 1934

During the rise of Nazi Germany, far-right international organizations began to emerge in the 1930s with the International Conference of Fascist Parties in 1932 and the Fascist International Congress in 1934. During the 1934 Fascist International Conference, the Comitati d'Azione per l'Universalità di Roma (CAUR; English: Action Committees for the Universality of Rome), created by Benito Mussolini's Fascist Regime to create a network for a "Fascist International", representatives from far-right groups gathered in Montreux, Switzerland, including Romania's Iron Guard, Norway's Nasjonal Samling, the Greek National Socialist Party, Spain's Falange movement, Ireland's Blueshirts, France's Mouvement Franciste and Portugal's União Nacional, among others. However, no international group was fully established before the outbreak of World War II.

Following World War II, other far-right organizations attempted to establish themselves, such as the European organizations of Nouvel Ordre Européen, European Social Movement and Circulo Español de Amigos de Europa or the further-reaching World Union of National Socialists and the League for Pan-Nordic Friendship. Beginning in the 1980s, far-right groups began to solidify themselves through official political avenues.

With the founding of the European Union in 1993, far-right groups began to espouse Euroscepticism, nationalist and anti-migrant beliefs. By 2010, the Eurosceptic group European Alliance for Freedom emerged and saw some prominence during the 2014 European Parliament election. The majority of far-right groups in the 2010s began to establish international contacts with right-wing coalitions to develop a solidified platform. In 2017, Steve Bannon would create The Movement, an organization to create an international far-right group based on Aleksandr Dugin's The Fourth Political Theory, for the 2019 European Parliament election. The European Alliance for Freedom would also reorganize into Identity and Democracy for the 2019 European Parliament election. The Euronat (1997–2009), Alliance of European National Movements (2009–2019), Alliance for Peace and Freedom are far-right European political alliances in the EU.

The far-right Spanish party Vox initially introduced the Madrid Charter project, a planned group to denounce left-wing groups in Ibero-America, to the government of United States president Donald Trump while visiting the United States in February 2019, with Santiago Abascal and Rafael Bardají using their good relations with the administration to build support within the Republican Party and establishing strong ties with American contacts. In March 2019, Abascal tweeted an image of himself wearing a morion similar to a conquistador, with ABC writing in an article detailing the document that this event provided a narrative that "symbolizes in part the expansionist mood of Vox and its ideology far from Spain". The charter subsequently grew to include signers that had little to no relation to Latin America and Spanish-speaking areas. Vox has advised Javier Milei in Argentina, the Bolsonaro family in Brazil, José Antonio Kast in Chile and Keiko Fujimori in Peru.

Nationalists from Europe and the United States met at a Holiday Inn in St. Petersburg on March 22, 2015, for first convention of the International Russian Conservative Forum organized by pro-Putin Rodina-party. The event was attended by fringe right-wing extremists like Nordic Resistance Movement from Scandinavia but also by more mainstream MEPs from Golden Dawn and National Democratic Party of Germany. In addition to Rodina, Russian neo-Nazis from Russian Imperial Movement and Rusich Group were also in attendance. The event was attended by several notable American white supremacists including Jared Taylor and Brandon Russell.

== History by country ==
A 2025 Frontline PBS documentary about the Alternative for Germany claimed "according to some observers, the shift toward the right in Europe is unlikely to slow down. We've seen parties touting far-right ideologies gaining seats in Italy, France, the Netherlands — that's just to name a few."

=== Africa ===
==== Morocco ====
Morocco saw a spread of ultranationalism, antifeminism, and opposition to immigration themes in digital spaces.

==== Rwanda ====
A number of far-right extremist and paramilitary groups carried out the Rwandan genocide under the racial supremacist ideology of Hutu Power, developed by journalist and Hutu supremacist Hassan Ngeze. On 5 July 1975, exactly two years after the 1973 Rwandan coup d'état, the far right National Republican Movement for Democracy and Development (MRND) was founded under president Juvénal Habyarimana. Between 1975 and 1991, the MRND was the only legal political party in the country. It was dominated by Hutus, particularly from Habyarimana's home region of Northern Rwanda. An elite group of MRND party members who were known to have influence on the President and his wife Agathe Habyarimana are known as the akazu, an informal organization of Hutu extremists whose members planned and led the 1994 Rwandan genocide. Félicien Kabuga, a prominent Hutu businessman and member of the akazu, was a leading financier of the genocide; he provided thousands of machetes, which were the usual weapons used to kill. Kabuga also founded Radio Télévision Libre des Mille Collines, used to broadcast propaganda and direct the génocidaires. Kabuga was arrested in France on 16 May 2020, and charged with crimes against humanity.

===== Interahamwe =====
The Interahamwe was formed around 1990 as the youth wing of the MRND and enjoyed the backing of the Hutu Power government. The Interahamwe were driven out of Rwanda after Tutsi-led Rwandan Patriotic Front victory in the Rwandan Civil War in July 1994 and are considered a terrorist organization by many African and Western governments. The Interahamwe and splinter groups such as the Democratic Forces for the Liberation of Rwanda continue to wage an insurgency against Rwanda from neighboring countries, where they are also involved in local conflicts and terrorism. The Interahamwe were the main perpetrators of the Rwandan genocide, during which an estimated 500,000 to 1,000,000 Tutsi, Twa and moderate Hutus were killed from April to July 1994 and the term Interahamwe was widened to mean any civilian bands killing Tutsi.

===== Coalition for the Defence of the Republic =====
Other far-right groups and paramilitaries involved included the anti-democratic segregationist Coalition for the Defence of the Republic (CDR), which called for complete segregation of Hutus from Tutsis. The CDR had a paramilitary wing known as the Impuzamugambi. Together with the Interahamwe militia, the Impuzamugambi played a central role in the Rwandan genocide.

==== South Africa ====
===== Herstigte Nasionale Party =====
In 1969, the Herstigte Nasionale Party (HNP) under Albert Hertzog emerged as a breakaway group from the governing South African National Party, an Afrikaner ethno-nationalist party that implemented the racist, segregationist program of apartheid, the legal system of political, economic and social separation of the races intended to maintain and extend political and economic control of South Africa by the White minority. The HNP was formed after the South African National Party re-established diplomatic relations with Malawi and legislated to allow Māori players and spectators to enter the country during the 1970 New Zealand rugby union team tour in South Africa. The HNP advocated for a Calvinist, racially segregated and Afrikaans-speaking nation.

===== Afrikaner Weerstandsbeweging =====
In 1973, Eugène Terre'Blanche, a former police officer founded the Afrikaner Weerstandsbeweging (Afrikaner Resistance Movement), a South African neo-Nazi paramilitary organization, often described as a white supremacist group. Since its founding in 1973 by Eugène Terre'Blanche and six other far-right Afrikaners, it has been dedicated to secessionist Afrikaner nationalism and the creation of an independent Boer-Afrikaner republic in part of South Africa. During negotiations to end apartheid in South Africa in the early 1990s, the organization terrorized and killed black South Africans.

==== Togo ====
Togo has been ruled by members of the Gnassingbé family and the far-right military dictatorship formerly known as the Rally of the Togolese People since 1969. Despite the legalization of political parties in 1991 and the ratification of a democratic constitution in 1992, the regime continues to be regarded as oppressive. In 1993, the European Union cut off aid in reaction to the regime's human-rights offenses. After's Eyadema's death in 2005, his son Faure Gnassingbe took over, then stood down and was re-elected in elections that were widely described as fraudulent and occasioned violence that resulted in as many as 600 deaths and the flight from Togo of 40,000 refugees. In 2012, Faure Gnassingbe dissolved the RTP and created the Union for the Republic.

Throughout the reign of the Gnassingbé family, Togo has been extremely oppressive. According to a United States Department of State report based on conditions in 2010, human rights abuses are common and include "security force use of excessive force, including torture, which resulted in deaths and injuries; official impunity; harsh and life-threatening prison conditions; arbitrary arrests and detention; lengthy pretrial detention; executive influence over the judiciary; infringement of citizens' privacy rights; restrictions on freedoms of press, assembly, and movement; official corruption; discrimination and violence against women; child abuse, including female genital mutilation (FGM), and sexual exploitation of children; regional and ethnic discrimination; trafficking in persons, especially women and children; societal discrimination against persons with disabilities; official and societal discrimination against homosexual persons; societal discrimination against persons with HIV; and forced labor, including by children."

=== Americas ===
==== Brazil ====
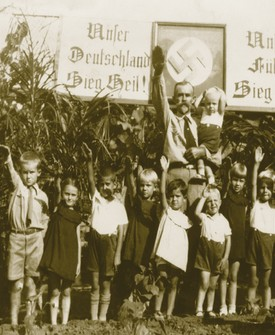
Children make the Nazi salute in Presidente Bernardes, Brazil, circa 1935.

During the 1920s and 1930s, a local brand of religious fascism appeared known as Brazilian Integralism, coalescing around the party known as Brazilian Integralist Action. It adopted many characteristics of European fascist movements, including a green-shirted paramilitary organization with uniformed ranks, highly regimented street demonstrations and rhetoric against Marxism and liberalism.

Prior to World War II, the Nazi Party had been making and distributing propaganda among ethnic Germans in Brazil. The Nazi regime built close ties with Brazil through the estimated 100 thousand native Germans and 1 million German descendants living in Brazil at the time. In 1928, the Brazilian section of the Nazi Party was founded in Timbó, Santa Catarina. This section reached 2,822 members and was the largest section of the Nazi Party outside Germany. About 100 thousand born Germans and about one million descendants lived in Brazil at that time.

After Germany's defeat in World War II, many Nazi war criminals fled to Brazil and hid among the German-Brazilian communities. The most notable example of this was Josef Mengele, a Nazi SS officer and physician known as the "Angel of Death" for his deadly experiments on prisoners at the Auschwitz II (Birkenau) concentration camp, who fled first to Argentina, then Paraguay, before finally settling in Brazil in 1960. Mengele eventually drowned in 1979 in Bertioga, on the coast of São Paulo state, without ever having been recognized in his 19 years in Brazil.

The far right has continued to operate throughout Brazil and a number of far-right parties existed in the modern era including Patriota, the Brazilian Labour Renewal Party, the Party of the Reconstruction of the National Order, the National Renewal Alliance and the Social Liberal Party as well as death squads such as the Command for Hunting Communists. Former President of Brazil Jair Bolsonaro was a member of the Alliance for Brazil, a far-right nationalist political group that aimed to become a political party, until 2022, when the party was disbanded. Since 2022, he is a member of the Liberal Party. Bolsonaro has been widely described by numerous media organizations as far right.

==== Guatemala ====
In Guatemala, the far-right government of Carlos Castillo Armas utilized death squads after coming to power in the 1954 Guatemalan coup d'état. Along with other far-right extremists, Castillo Armas started the National Liberation Movement (Movimiento de Liberación Nacional, or MLN). The founders of the party described it as the "party of organized violence". The new government promptly reversed the democratic reforms initiated during the Guatemalan Revolution and the agrarian reform program (Decree 900) that was the main project of president Jacobo Arbenz Guzman and which directly impacted the interests of both the United Fruit Company and the Guatemalan landowners.

Mano Blanca, otherwise known as the Movement of Organized Nationalist Action, was set up in 1966 as a front for the MLN to carry out its more violent activities, along with many other similar groups, including the New Anticommunist Organization and the Anticommunist Council of Guatemala. Mano Blanca was active during the governments of colonel Carlos Arana Osorio and general Kjell Laugerud García and was dissolved by general Fernando Romeo Lucas Garcia in 1978.

Armed with the support and coordination of the Guatemalan Armed Forces, Mano Blanca began a campaign described by the United States Department of State as one of "kidnappings, torture, and summary execution". One of the main targets of Mano Blanca was the Revolutionary Party, an anti-communist group that was the only major reform oriented party allowed to operate under the military-dominated regime. Other targets included the banned leftist parties. Human rights activist Blase Bonpane described the activities of Mano Blanca as being an integral part of the policy of the Guatemalan government and by extension the policy of the United States government and the Central Intelligence Agency. Overall, Mano Blanca was responsible for thousands of murders and kidnappings, leading travel writer Paul Theroux to refer to them as "Guatemala's version of a volunteer Gestapo unit".

==== Chile ====
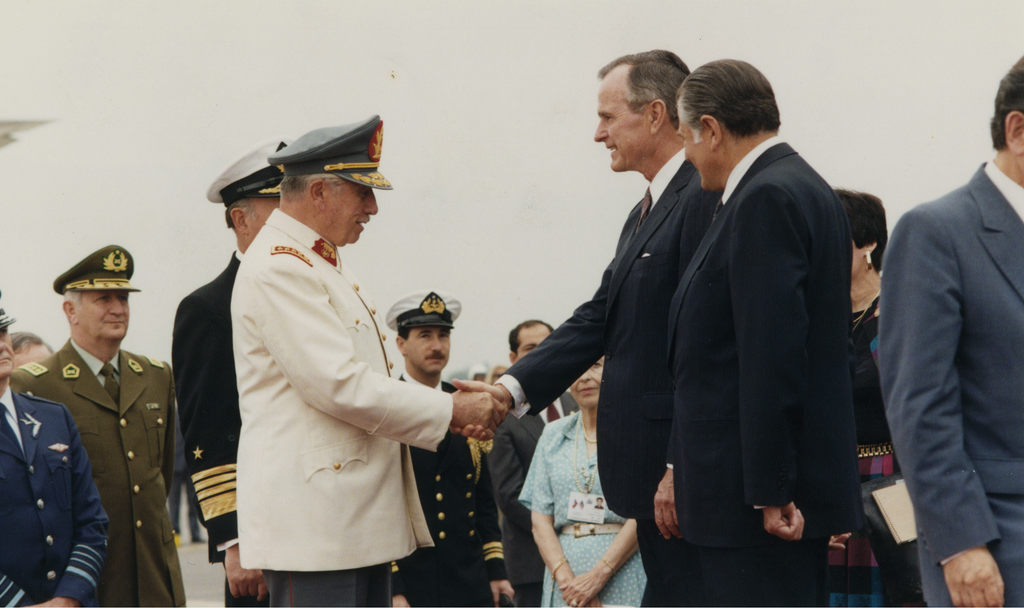
Dictator of Chile Augusto Pinochet meeting with United States President George H. W. Bush in 1990

The National Socialist Movement of Chile (MNSCH) was created in the 1930s with the funding from the German population in Chile. In 1938, the MNSCH was dissolved after it attempted a coup and recreated itself as the Popular Freedom Alliance party, later merging with the Agrarian Party to create the Agrarian Labor Party (PAL). PAL would go through various mergers to become the Partido Nacional Popular (Chile), then National Action and finally the National Party.

Following the fall of Nazi Germany, many Nazis fled to Chile. The National Party supported the 1973 Chilean coup d'état that established the military dictatorship of Augusto Pinochet with many members assuming positions in Pinochet's government. Pinochet headed a far-right dictatorship in Chile from 1973 to 1990. According to author Peter Levenda, Pinochet was "openly pro-Nazi" and used former Gestapo members to train his own Dirección de Inteligencia Nacional (DINA) personnel. Pinochet's DINA sent political prisoners to the Chilean-German town of Colonia Dignidad, with the town's actions being defended by the Pinochet government. The Central Intelligence Agency and Simon Wiesenthal also provided evidence of Josef Mengele – the infamous Nazi concentration camp doctor known as the "Angel of Death" for his lethal experiments on human subjects – being present in Colonia Dignidad. Former DINA member Michael Townley also stated that biological warfare weapons experiments occurred at the colony.

Following the end of Pinochet's government, the National Party would split to become the more centrist National Renewal (RN), while individuals who supported Pinochet organized Independent Democratic Union (UDI). UDI is a far-right political party that was formed by former Pinochet officials. In 2019, the far-right Republican Party was founded by José Antonio Kast, a UDI politician who believed his former party criticized Pinochet too often. According to Cox and Blanco, the Republican Party appeared in Chilean politics in a similar manner to Spain's Vox party, with both parties splitting off from an existing right wing party to collect disillusioned voters.

==== El Salvador ====
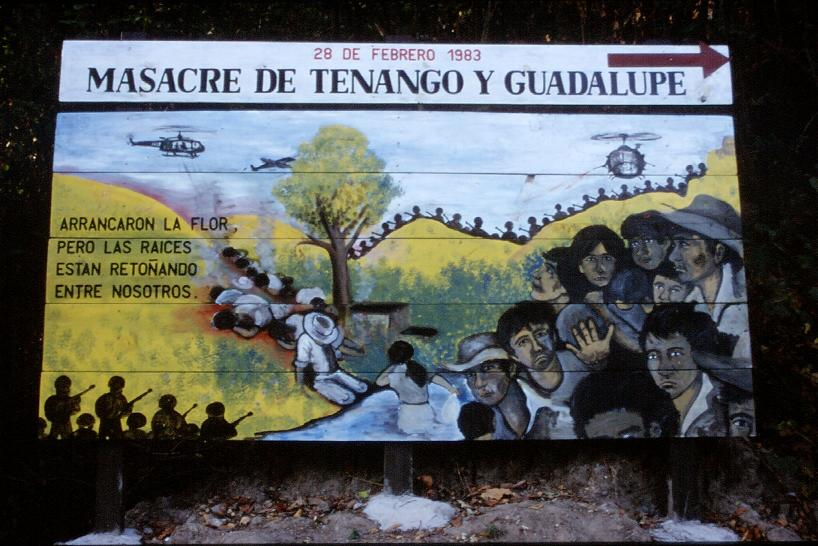
A billboard serving as a reminder of one of many massacres in El Salvador that occurred during the civil war

During the Salvadoran Civil War, far-right death squads known in Spanish by the name of Escuadrón de la Muerte, literally "Squadron of Death, achieved notoriety when a sniper assassinated Archbishop Óscar Romero while he was saying mass in March 1980. In December 1980, three American nuns and a lay worker were gangraped and murdered by a military unit later found to have been acting on specific orders. Death squads were instrumental in killing thousands of peasants and activists. Funding for the squads came primarily from right-wing Salvadoran businessmen and landowners.

El Salvadorian death squads indirectly received arms, funding, training and advice during the Jimmy Carter, Ronald Reagan and George H. W. Bush administrations. Some death squads such as Sombra Negra are still operating in El Salvador.

==== Honduras ====
Honduras also had far-right death squads active through the 1980s, the most notorious of which was Battalion 3–16. Hundreds of people, teachers, politicians and union bosses were assassinated by government-backed forces. Battalion 316 received substantial support and training from the United States through the Central Intelligence Agency. At least nineteen members were School of the Americas graduates. As of mid-2006, seven members, including Billy Joya, later played important roles in the administration of President Manuel Zelaya.

Following the 2009 Honduran constitutional crisis, former Battalion 3–16 member Nelson Willy Mejía Mejía became Director-General of Immigration and Billy Joya was de facto President Roberto Micheletti's security advisor. Napoleón Nassar Herrera, another former Battalion 3–16 member, was high Commissioner of Police for the north-west region under Zelaya and under Micheletti, even becoming a Secretary of Security spokesperson "for dialogue" under Micheletti. Zelaya claimed that Joya had reactivated the death squad, with dozens of government opponents having been murdered since the ascent of the Michiletti and Lobo governments.

==== Mexico ====
===== National Synarchist Union =====
The largest far-right party in Mexico is the National Synarchist Union. It was historically a movement of the Roman Catholic extreme right, in some ways akin to clerical fascism and Falangism, strongly opposed to the left-wing and secularist policies of the Institutional Revolutionary Party and its predecessors that governed Mexico from 1929 to 2000 and 2012 to 2018.

==== Peru ====
===== Fujimorism =====
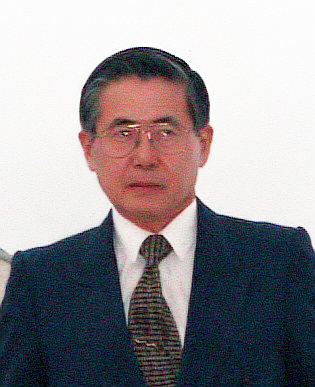
Alberto Fujimori, the creator of Fujimorism

During the internal conflict in Peru and a struggling presidency of Alan García, the Peruvian Armed Forces created Plan Verde, initially a coup plan that involved establishing a government that would carry out the genocide of impoverished and indigenous Peruvians, the control or censorship of media and the establishment of a neoliberal economy controlled by a military junta in Peru. Military planners also decided against the coup as they expected Mario Vargas Llosa, a neoliberal candidate, to be elected in the 1990 Peruvian general election. Vargas Llosa later reported that Anthony C. E. Quainton, the United States Ambassador to Peru, personally told him that allegedly leaked documents of the Central Intelligence Agency (CIA) purportedly being supportive of his opponent Alberto Fujimori were authentic, reportedly due to Fujimori's relationship with Vladimiro Montesinos, a former National Intelligence Service (SIN) officer who was tasked with spying on the Peruvian military for the CIA. An agreement was ultimately adopted between the armed forces and Fujimori after he was inaugurated president, with many of the objectives outlined in Plan Verde implemented by Fujimori and his followers. Fujimori then established Fujimorism, an ideology with authoritarian and conservative traits that is still prevalent throughout Peru's institutions, leading Peru through the 1992 Peruvian coup d'état until he fled to Japan in 2000 during the Vladivideos scandal. Following Alberto Fujimori's arrest and trial, his daughter Keiko Fujimori assumed leadership of the Fujimorist movement and established Popular Force, a far-right political party. The 2016 Peruvian general election resulted with the party holding the most power in the Congress of Peru from 2016 to 2019, marking the beginning of a political crisis. Following the 2021 Peruvian general election, far-right politician Rafael López Aliaga and his party Popular Renewal rose in popularity and a far-right Congress – with the body's largest far-right bloc being Popular Force, Popular Renewal and Advance Country – was elected into office. Following the election, La Resistencia Dios, Patria y Familia, a neofascist militant organization would promote Fujimorism and oppose President Pedro Castillo.

==== United States ====
In United States politics, the terms "extreme right", "far-right", and "ultra-right" are labels used to describe "militant forms of insurgent revolutionary right ideology and separatist ethnocentric nationalism", according to The Public Eye. The terms are used for groups and movements such as Christian Identity, the Creativity Movement, the Ku Klux Klan, the National Socialist Movement, the National Alliance, the Joy of Satan Ministries, and the Order of Nine Angles. These far-right groups share conspiracist views of power which are often antisemitic and reject pluralist democracy in favor of an organic oligarchy that would unite the perceived homogeneously racial Völkish nation. The far-right in the United States is composed of various neo-fascist, neo-Nazi, white nationalist, and white supremacist organizations and networks who have been known to refer to an "acceleration" of racial conflict through violent means such as assassinations, murders, terrorist attacks, and societal collapse, in order to achieve the building of a white ethnostate.

===== Radical right =====
Though US President Trump said in September 2025 that "the radicals on the left are the problem" with political violence, cumulatively over decades, most extremist killings in the US have been caused by right-wing perpetrators. From 2022 through 2024, all 61 political killings were committed by right-wing extremists.

Over decades, right wing ideologically motivated homicides have substantially outnumbered those perpetrated by left wing perpetrators in the US. Also, far-right motivated homicides have occurred much more frequently than jihadi violence inspired by Islamic extremism (not shown in chart).

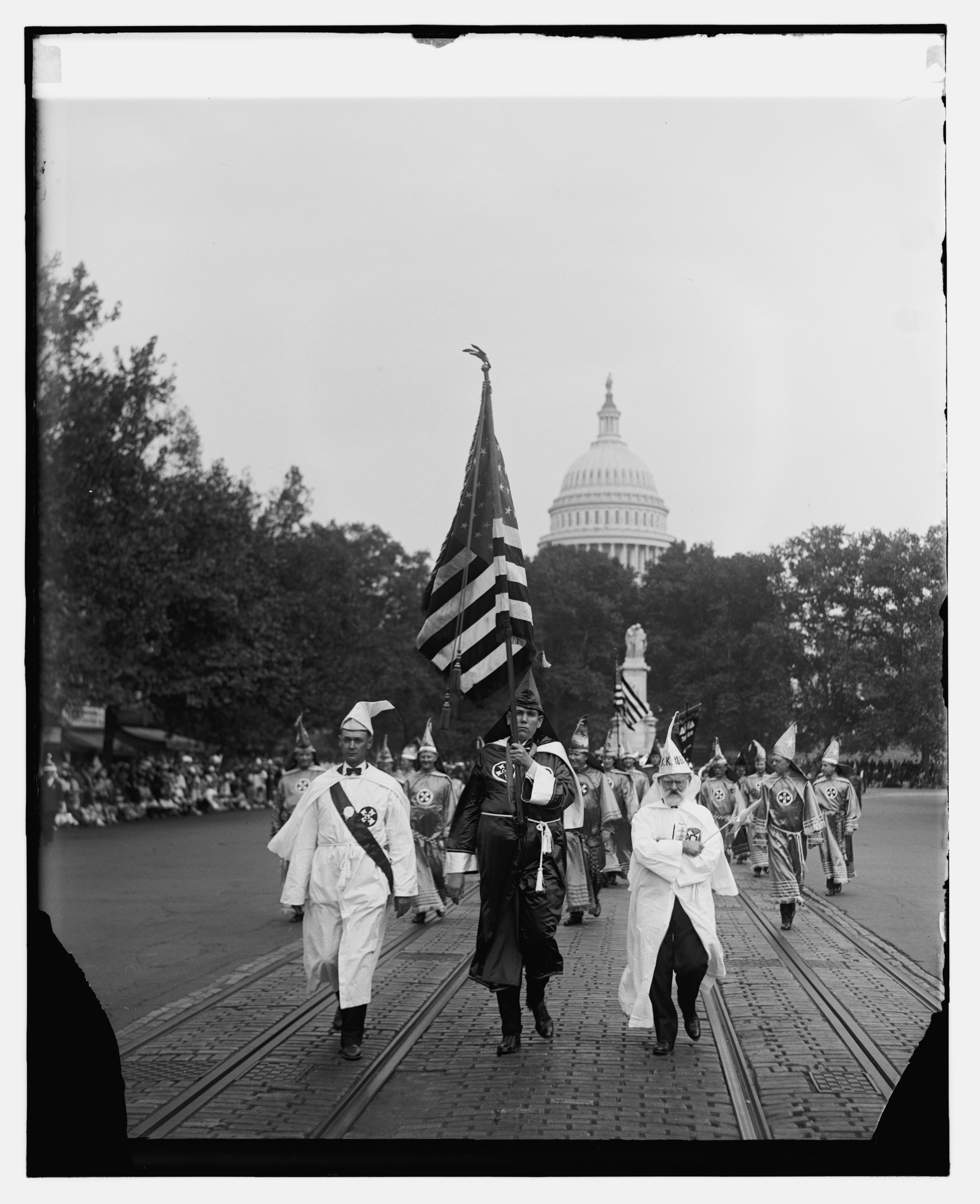
Ku Klux Klan parade in Washington, D.C., September 1926

Starting in the 1870s and continuing through the late 19th century, numerous white supremacist paramilitary groups operated in the South, with the goal of organizing against and intimidating supporters of the Republican Party. Examples of such groups included the Red Shirts and the White League. The Second Ku Klux Klan, which was formed in 1915, combined Protestant fundamentalism and moralism with right-wing extremism. Its major support came from the urban South, the Midwest, and the Pacific Coast. While the Klan initially drew upper middle class support, its bigotry and violence alienated these members and it came to be dominated by less educated and poorer members.

Between the 1920s and the 1930s, the Ku Klux Klan developed an explicitly nativist, pro-Anglo-Saxon Protestant, anti-Catholic, anti-Irish, anti-Italian, and anti-Jewish stance in relation to the growing political, economic, and social uncertainty related to the arrival of European immigrants on the American soil, predominantly composed of Irish people, Italians, and Eastern European Jews. The Ku Klux Klan claimed that there was a secret Catholic army within the United States loyal to the Pope, that one million Knights of Columbus were arming themselves, and that Irish-American policemen would shoot Protestants as heretics. Their sensationalistic claims eventually developed into full-blown political conspiracy theories, to the point that the Klan claimed that Roman Catholics were planning to take Washington and put the Vatican in power and that all presidential assassinations had been carried out by Roman Catholics.

The prominent Klan leader D. C. Stephenson believed in the antisemitic canard of Jewish control of finance, claiming that international Jewish bankers were behind the World War I and planned to destroy economic opportunities for Christians. Other Klansmen believed in the Jewish Bolshevism conspiracy theory and claimed that the Russian Revolution and communism were orchestrated by Jews. They frequently reprinted parts of The Protocols of the Elders of Zion and New York City was condemned as an evil city controlled by Jews and Roman Catholics. The objects of the Klan fear tended to vary by locale and included African Americans as well as American Roman Catholics, Jews, labour unions, liquor, Orientals, and Wobblies. They were also anti-elitist and attacked "the intellectuals", seeing themselves as egalitarian defenders of the common man.

During the Great Depression, there were a large number of small nativist groups, whose ideologies and bases of support were similar to those of earlier nativist groups. However, proto-fascist movements such as Huey Long's Share Our Wealth and Charles Coughlin's National Union for Social Justice emerged which differed from other right-wing groups by attacking big business, calling for economic reforms, and rejecting nativism. Coughlin's group later developed a racist ideology.

During the Cold War and the Red Scares, the far right "saw spies and communists influencing government and entertainment. Thus, despite bipartisan anticommunism in the United States, it was the right that mainly fought the great ideological battle against the communists." The John Birch Society, founded in 1958, is a prominent example of a far-right organization mainly concerned with anti-communism and the perceived threat of communism. Neo-Nazi militant Robert Jay Matthews of the White supremacist group The Order came to support the John Birch Society, especially when conservative icon Barry Goldwater from Arizona ran for the presidency on the Republican Party ticket. Far-right conservatives consider John Birch to be the first casualty of the Cold War. In the 1990s, many conservatives turned against then-President George H. W. Bush, who pleasured neither the Republican Party's more moderate and far-right wings. As a result, Bush was primared by Pat Buchanan. In the 2000s, critics of President George W. Bush's conservative unilateralism argued it can be traced to both Vice President Dick Cheney who embraced the policy since the early 1990s and to far-right Congressmen who won their seats during the conservative revolution of 1994.

Although small voluntary militias had existed in the United States throughout the latter half of the 20th century, the groups became more popular during the early 1990s, after a series of standoffs between armed citizens and federal government agents, such as the 1992 Ruby Ridge siege and 1993 Waco Siege. These groups expressed concern for what they perceived as government tyranny within the United States and generally held constitutionalist, libertarian, and right-libertarian political views, with a strong focus on the Second Amendment gun rights and tax protest. They also embraced many of the same conspiracy theories as predecessor groups on the radical right, particularly the New World Order conspiracy theory. Examples of such groups are the patriot and militia movements Oath Keepers and the Three Percenters. A minority of militia groups, such as the Aryan Nations and the Posse Comitatus, were White nationalists and saw militia and patriot movements as a form of White resistance against what they perceived to be a liberal and multiculturalist government. Militia and patriot organizations were involved in the 2014 Bundy standoff and the 2016 occupation of the Malheur National Wildlife Refuge.

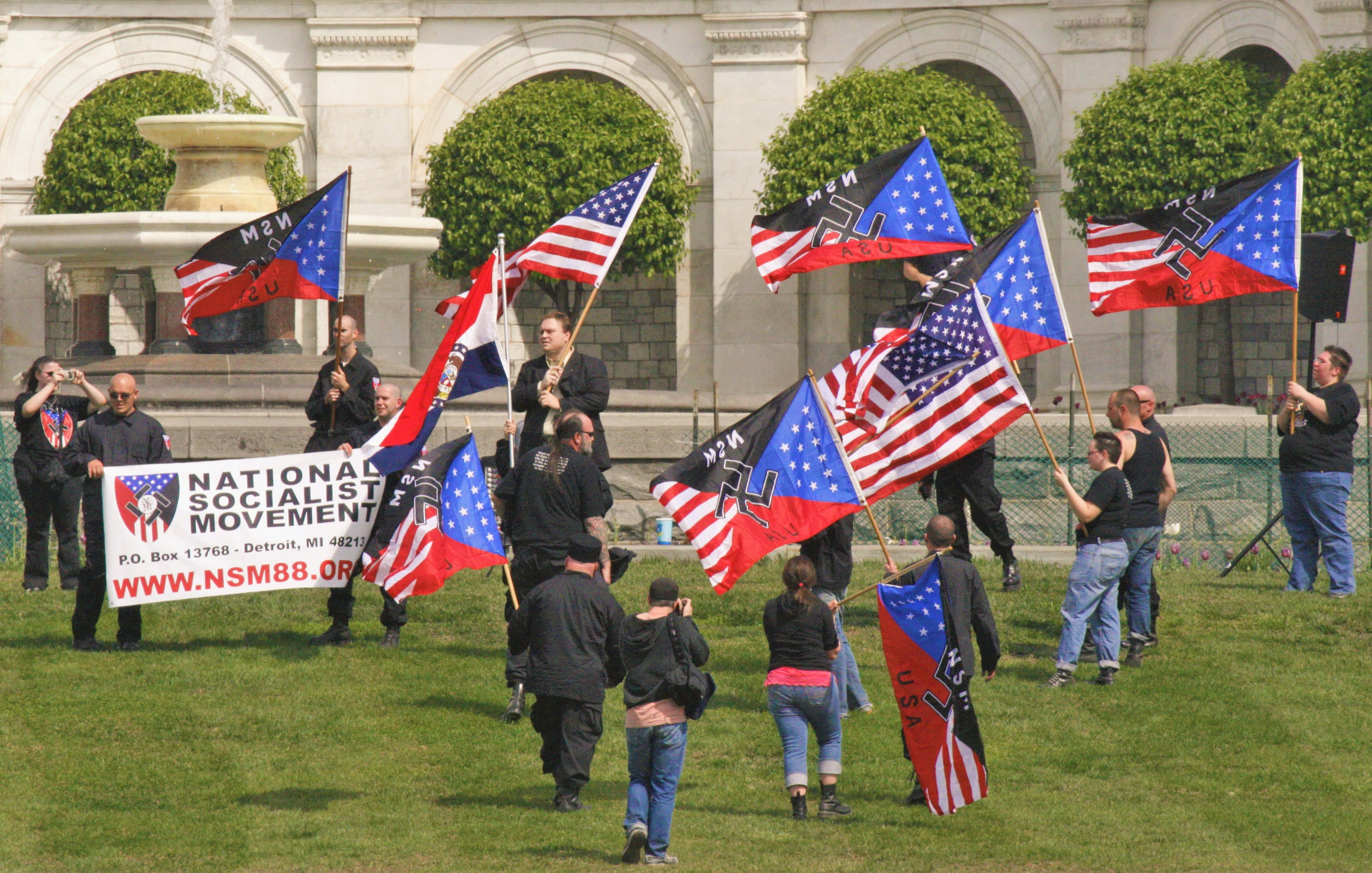
National Socialist Movement rally on the west lawn of the US Capitol, Washington, DC, 2008

After the September 11 attacks in 2001, the counter-jihad movement, supported by groups such as Stop Islamization of America and individuals such as Frank Gaffney and Pamela Geller, began to gain traction among the American right. The counter-jihad members were widely dubbed "Islamophobic" for their vocal criticism of the Islamic religion and its founder Muhammad, and their belief that there was a significant threat posed by Muslims living in America. Its proponents believed that the United States was under threat from "Islamic supremacism", accusing the Council on American-Islamic Relations and even prominent conservatives such as Suhail A. Khan and Grover Norquist of supporting radical Islamist groups and organizations, such as the Muslim Brotherhood. The alt-right emerged during the 2016 United States presidential election cycle in support of the Donald Trump's presidential campaign (see: Trumpism). It draws influence from paleoconservatism, paleolibertarianism, white nationalism, the manosphere, and the Identitarian and neoreactionary movements. The alt-right differs from previous radical right movements due to its heavy internet presence on websites such as 4chan.

Chetan Bhatt, in White Extinction: Metaphysical Elements of Contemporary Western Fascism, says that "The 'fear of white extinction', and related ideas of population eugenics, have travelled far and represent a wider political anxiety about 'white displacement' in the US, UK, and Europe that has fuelled the right-wing phenomena referred to by that sanitizing word 'populism', a term that neatly evades attention to the racism and white majoritarianism that energizes it."

=== Asia ===
==== India ====
The Bharatiya Janata Party in India has been claimed to combine economic nationalism with religious nationalism. It espouses the Hindu nationalist ideology of Hindutva, which had borrowed ideas from European fascism.

==== Indonesia ====
Some Islamists in Indonesia are far-right.

==== Iraq ====
Hawpa is a Kurdish Neo-Nazi organization in Iraq.

==== Israel ====
Flag of Kach, used by Kahanists

Kach was a radical Orthodox Jewish, religious Zionist political party in Israel, existing from 1971 to 1994. Founded by Rabbi Meir Kahane in 1971, based on his Jewish-Orthodox-nationalist ideology subsequently known as Kahanism, which held the view that most Arabs living in Israel are enemies of Jews and Israel itself, and believed that a Jewish theocratic state, where non-Jews have no voting rights, should be created. The party secured a single seat in the Knesset in the 1984 election, but was subsequently barred from standing in elections, and both it and Kahanist organizations were banned outright in 1994 by the Israeli cabinet under 1948 anti-terrorism laws, following statements by it in support of the 1994 Cave of the Patriarchs massacre by a Kach supporter.

In 2015, the Kach party and Kahanist movement were believed to have an overlapping membership of fewer than 100 people, with links to the modern party Otzma Yehudit (Jewish Power) party, which, running on a Kahanist and anti-Arab platform, won six seats in the 2022 Israeli legislative election, having run jointly with fellow far-right parties Religious Zionist Party and Noam. The thirty-seventh government of Israel which formed after the 2022 Israeli legislative election as subsequently been critiqued as Israel's most hardline and far-right government to date. The coalition government consists of six parties: Likud, United Torah Judaism, Shas, Otzma Yehudit, Religious Zionist Party and Noam, so having half of its coalition partners hailing from the far-right. The government has been noted for its significant shift towards far-right policies, and the appointment of controversial far-right politicians, including Itamar Ben-Gvir and Bezalel Smotrich, to positions of considerable influence.

===== Ties with European far-right =====
There is also a complex relationship between Israel and the European far-right that has been developing for more than 15 years. The first major public sign of their alliance was in 2010 at an international far-right conference in Tel Aviv organized by a Likud party member. A primary motivation is a shared anti-Islam ideology but there is also a common dislike of the European Union, of Arab and Muslim immigrants as well as support for undermining democracy and installing autocratic, or worse, rulers and regimes. "Yair Netanyahu, the prime minister's son, last week called for the death of the European Union and the return of a 'Christian' Europe." Other details suggest a deeper collaboration between the Likud party and the German AfD. "In 2019, the Bundestag passed a resolution condemning B.D.S. as antisemitic .The history of the resolution is telling. A version was originally introduced by the AfD". Netanyahu's government has actively cultivated relations with various European far-right parties and leaders, including Vlaams Belang, Attack, the Freedom Party of Austria, the Alliance for the Union of Romanians and the Sweden Democrats.

These parties offer strong support for Israel's hardline policies towards Palestinians, its opposition to Palestinian statehood, and its pro-settlement stance. Netanyahu has also cultivated a particularly strong bond with Viktor Orbán's Fidesz party in Hungary, a key figure in the European far-right landscape. The Likud party recently joined the Patriots for Europe alliance in the European Parliament as an observer member.

==== Japan ====
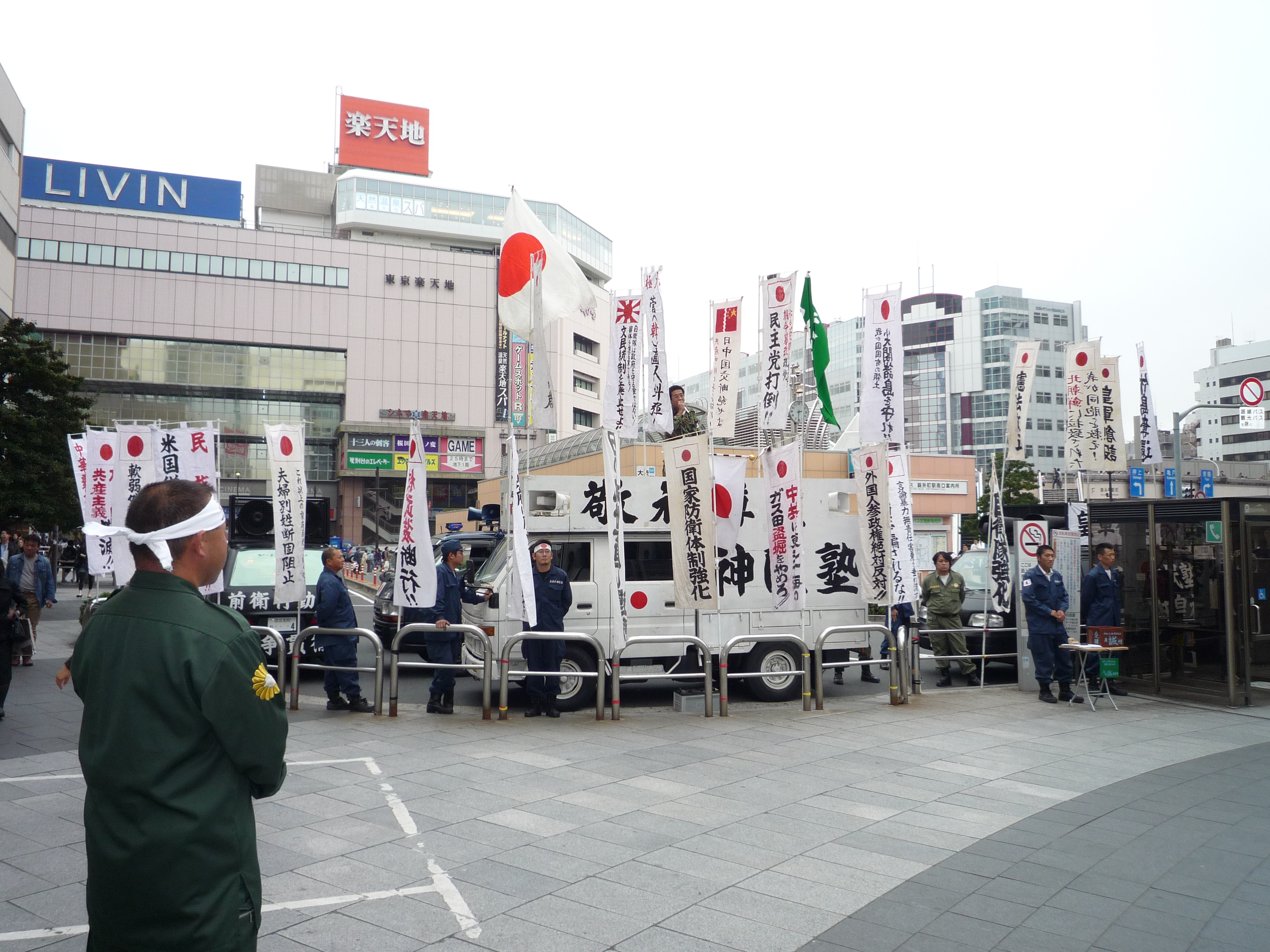
Gaisen Uyoku (街宣右翼), a Japanese far-right group, holding an anti-China speech at the square of Kinshichō Station in Sumida, Tokyo (2010)

In 1996, the National Police Agency estimated that there were over 1,000 extremist right-wing groups in Japan, with about 100,000 members in total. These groups are known in Japanese as Uyoku dantai. While there are political differences among the groups, they generally carry a philosophy of anti-leftism, hostility towards China, North Korea and South Korea, and justification of Japan's role and war crimes in World War II. Uyoku dantai groups are well known for their highly visible propaganda vehicles fitted with loudspeakers and prominently marked with the name of the group and propaganda slogans. The vehicles play patriotic or wartime-era Japanese songs. Activists affiliated with such groups have used Molotov cocktails and time bombs to intimidate moderate Japanese politicians and public figures, including former Deputy Foreign Minister Hitoshi Tanaka and Fuji Xerox Chairman Yotaro Kobayashi. An ex-member of a right-wing group set fire to Liberal Democratic Party politician Koichi Kato's house. Koichi Kato and Yotaro Kobayashi had spoken out against Koizumi's visits to Yasukuni Shrine. Openly revisionist, Nippon Kaigi is considered "the biggest right-wing organization in Japan".

==== Malaysia ====
Far-right non-governmental organizations have been appropriating human rights language in Malaysia.

=== Europe ===
==== Armenia ====
The Armenian-Aryan Racialist Political Movement and the Adequate Party are the main far-right political movements in Armenia.

==== Croatia ====
Individuals and groups in Croatia that employ far-right politics are most often associated with the historical Ustaše movement, hence they have connections to neo-Nazism and neo-fascism. That World War II political movement was an extremist organization at the time supported by the German Nazis and the Italian Fascists. The association with the Ustaše has been called neo-Ustashism by Slavko Goldstein. Most active far-right political parties in Croatia openly state their continuity with the Ustaše. These include the Croatian Party of Rights and Authentic Croatian Party of Rights. Croatia's far-right often advocates the false theory that the Jasenovac concentration camp was a "labour camp" where mass murder did not take place.

The coalition led by Miroslav Škoro's far-right Homeland Movement came third at the 2020 parliamentary election, winning 10.9% of the vote and 16 seats.

==== Estonia ====
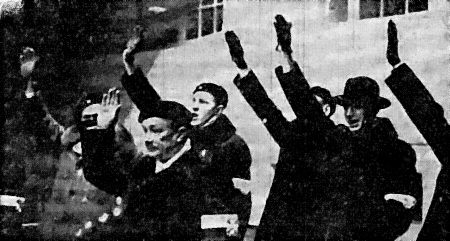
General Andres Larka speaking in 1933

Estonia's most significant far-right movement was the Vaps movement. Its ideological predecessor Valve Liit was founded by Admiral Johan Pitka and later banned for maligning the government. The organization became politicized quickly Vaps soon turned into a mass fascist movement. In 1933, Estonians voted on Vaps' proposed changes to the constitution and the party later won a large proportion of the vote. However, the State Elder Konstantin Päts declared state of emergency and imprisoned the leadership of the Vaps. In 1935, all political parties were banned. In 1935, a Vaps coup attempt was discovered, which led to the banning of the Finnish Patriotic People's Movement's youth wing that had been secretly aiding and arming them.

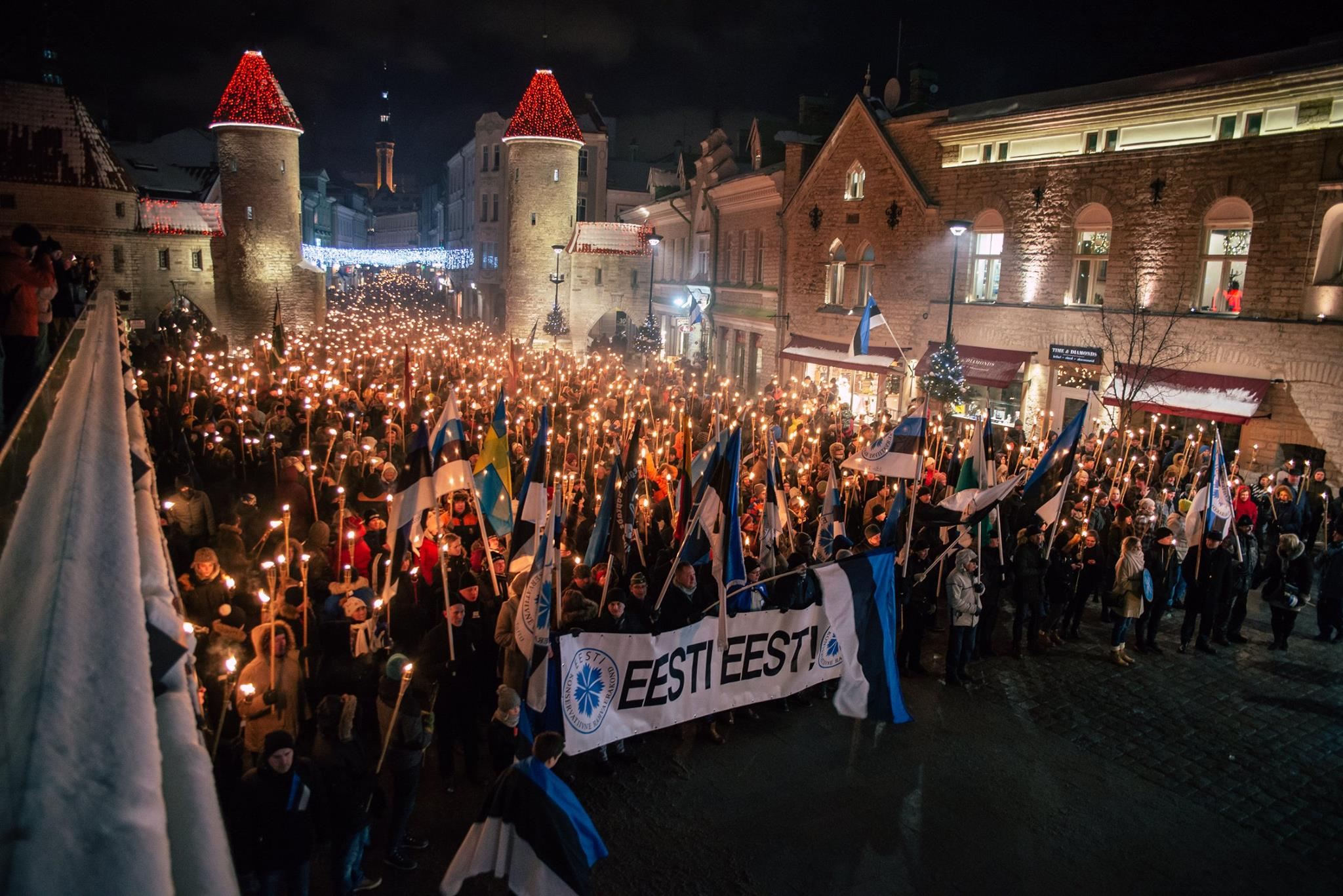
Far-right torch march in Tallinn

During World War II, the Estonian Self-Administration was a collaborationist pro-Nazi government set up in Estonia, headed by Vaps member Hjalmar Mäe. In the 21st century, the coalition-governing Conservative People's Party of Estonia been described as far right. The neo-Nazi terrorist organization Feuerkrieg Division was found and operates in the country, with some members of the Conservative People's Party of Estonia having been linked to the Feuerkrieg Division. The party's youth organization Blue Awakening organizes an annual torchlight march through Tallinn on Estonia's Independence Day. The event has been harshly criticized by the Simon Wiesenthal Center that described it as "Nuremberg-esque" and likened the ideology of the participants to that of the Estonian Nazi collaborators.

==== Finland ====
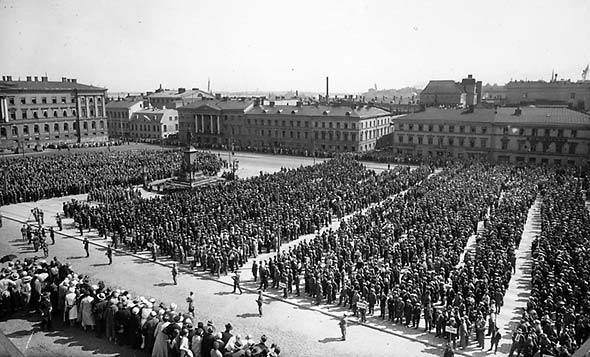
The Peasant March, a show of force in Helsinki by the Lapua Movement on 7 July 1930

In Finland, support for the far right was most widespread between 1920 and 1940 when the Academic Karelia Society, Lapua Movement, Patriotic People's Movement and Vientirauha operated in the country and had hundreds of thousands of members. Far-right groups exercised considerable political power during this period, pressuring the government to outlaw communist parties and newspapers and expel Freemasons from the armed forces. During the Cold War, all parties deemed fascist were banned according to the Paris Peace Treaties and all former fascist activists had to find new political homes. Despite Finlandization, many continued in public life. Three former members of the Waffen SS served as ministers of defense; Sulo Suorttanen and Pekka Malinen as well as Mikko Laaksonen.

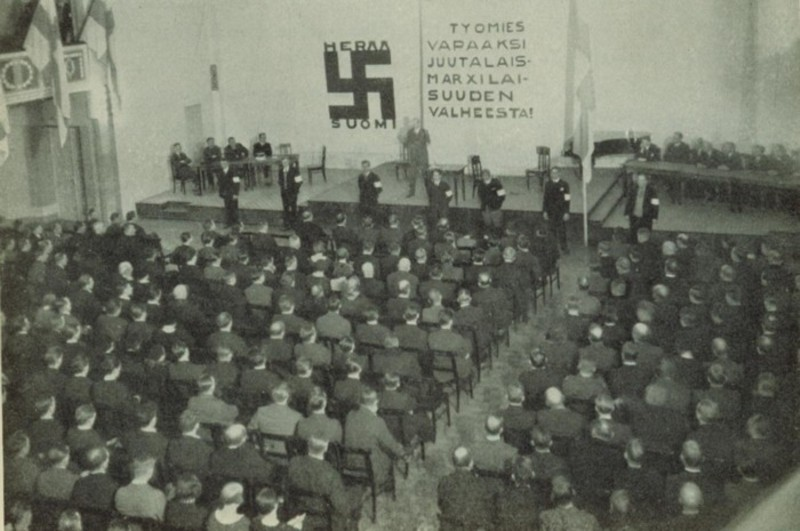
Captain Arvi Kalsta addressing an SKJ meeting

The skinhead culture gained momentum during the late 1980s and peaked during the late 1990s. Numerous hate crimes were committed against refugees, including a number of racially motivated murders.

Today, the most prominent neo-Nazi group is the Nordic Resistance Movement, which is tied to multiple murders, attempted murders and assaults of political enemies was found in 2006 and proscribed in 2019. Prominent far-right parties include the Blue-and-Black Movement and Power Belongs to the People. The second biggest Finnish party, the Finns Party, has been described as far right. The former leader of the Finns party and current speaker of the Parliament Jussi Halla-aho, has been convicted of hate speech due to his comments stating that, "Prophet Muhammad was a pedophile and Islam justifies pedophilia and Pedophilia was Allah's will." Finns Party members have frequently supported far-right and neo-Nazi movements such as the Finnish Defense League, Soldiers of Odin, Nordic Resistance Movement, Rajat Kiinni (Close the Borders), and Suomi Ensin (Finland First)." In the 1990s and 2000s, before the breakthrough of the Finns Party, a few neo-Nazi candidates enjoyed success, like Janne Kujala of Finland - Fatherland (founded as Aryan Germanic Brotherhood) and Jouni Lanamäki who was previously associated with the Nordic Reich Party. Pekka Siitoin of the National Democracy Party was the fifth most popular candidate in Naantali city council elections.

The NRM and Finns party and other far-right groups organize an annual torch march demonstration in Helsinki in memory of the Finnish SS-battalion on the Finnish independence day which ends at the Hietaniemi cemetery where members visit the tomb of Carl Gustaf Emil Mannerheim and the monument to the Finnish SS Battalion. The event is protested by antifascists, leading to counterdemonstrators being violently assaulted by NRM members who act as security. The demonstration attracts close to 3,000 participants according to the estimates of the police and hundreds of officers patrol Helsinki to prevent violent clashes.

==== France ====
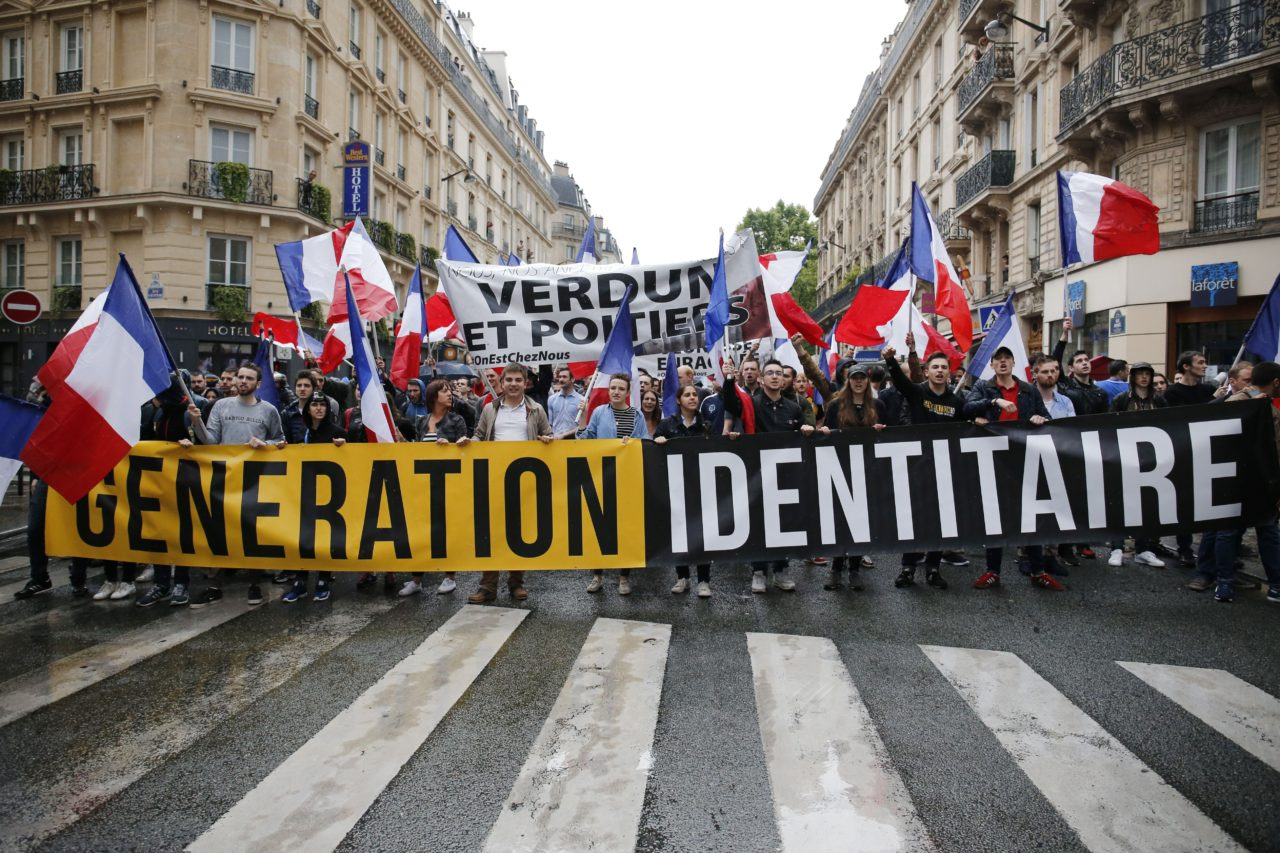
A Génération Identitaire demonstration in France, 2017

The largest far-right party in Europe is the French anti-immigration party National Rally, formally known as the National Front. The party was founded in 1972, uniting a variety of French far-right groups under the leadership of Jean-Marie Le Pen. Since 1984, it has been the major force of French nationalism. Jean-Marie Le Pen's daughter Marine Le Pen was elected to succeed him as party leader in 2012. Under Jean-Marie Le Pen's leadership, the party sparked outrage for hate speech, including Holocaust denial and Islamophobia.

==== Germany ====
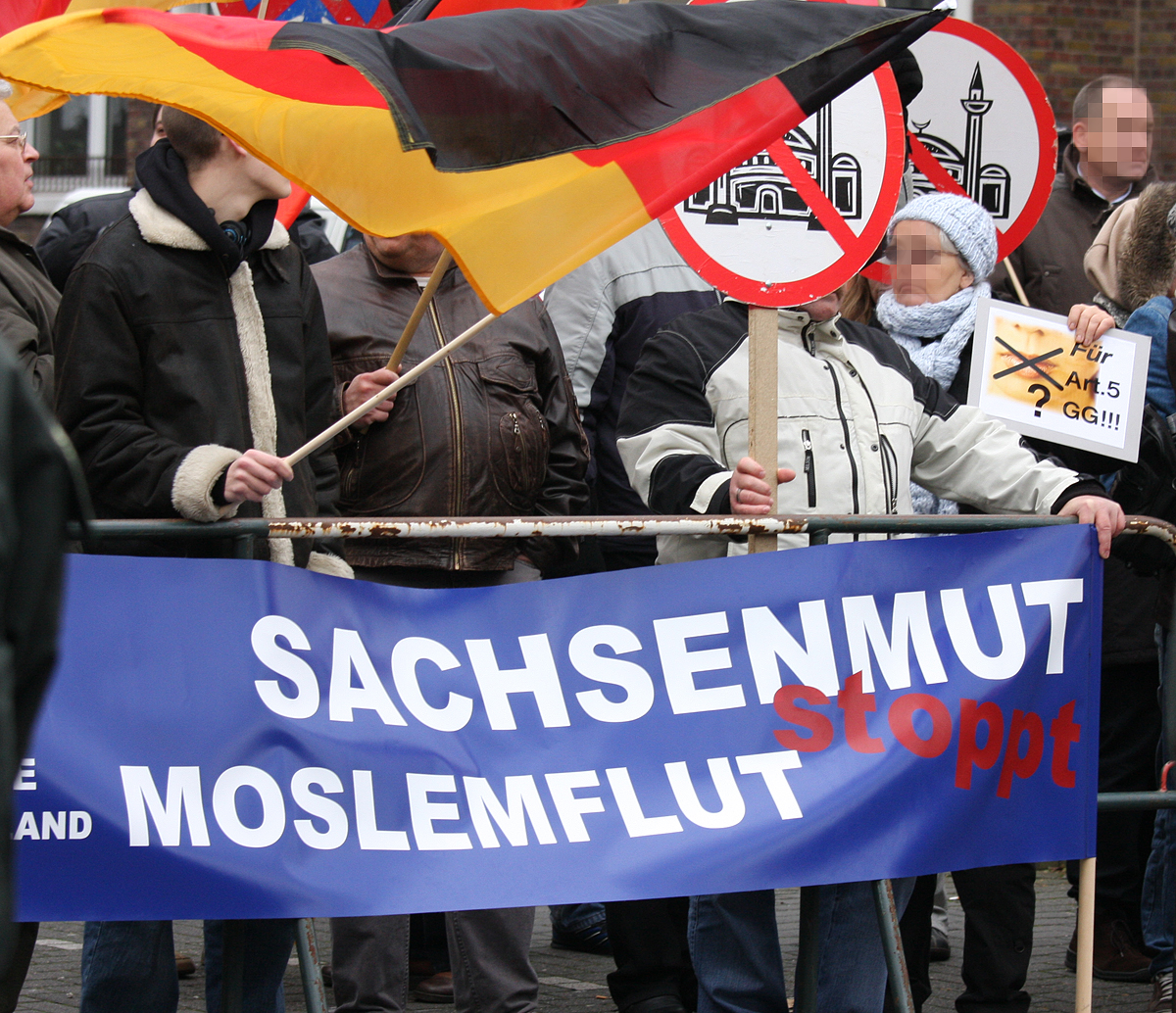
Right-wing populists protesting against Muslims in Germany, 2008

In 1945, the Allied powers took control of Germany and banned the swastika, Nazi Party and the publication of Mein Kampf. Explicitly Nazi and neo-Nazi organizations are banned in Germany. In 1960, the West German parliament voted unanimously to "make it illegal to incite hatred, to provoke violence, or to insult, ridicule or defame 'parts of the population' in a manner apt to breach the peace". German law outlaws anything that "approves of, glorifies or justifies the violent and despotic rule of the National Socialists". Section 86a of the Strafgesetzbuch (Criminal Code) outlaws any "use of symbols of unconstitutional organizations" outside the contexts of "art or science, research or teaching". The law primarily outlaws the use of Nazi symbols, flags, insignia, uniforms, slogans and forms of greeting. In the 21st century, the German far right consists of various small parties and two larger groups, namely Alternative for Germany (AfD) Pegida.

In March 2021, the Germany domestic intelligence agency Federal Office for the Protection of the Constitution placed the AfD under surveillance, the first time in the post-war period that a main opposition party had been subjected to such scrutiny.

In contemporary Germany, Far-right parties such as National Democratic Party of Germany (NPD), German People's Union (DVU) and Alternative for Germany (AfD) are stronger in eastern Germany.

==== Greece ====
===== Metaxism =====
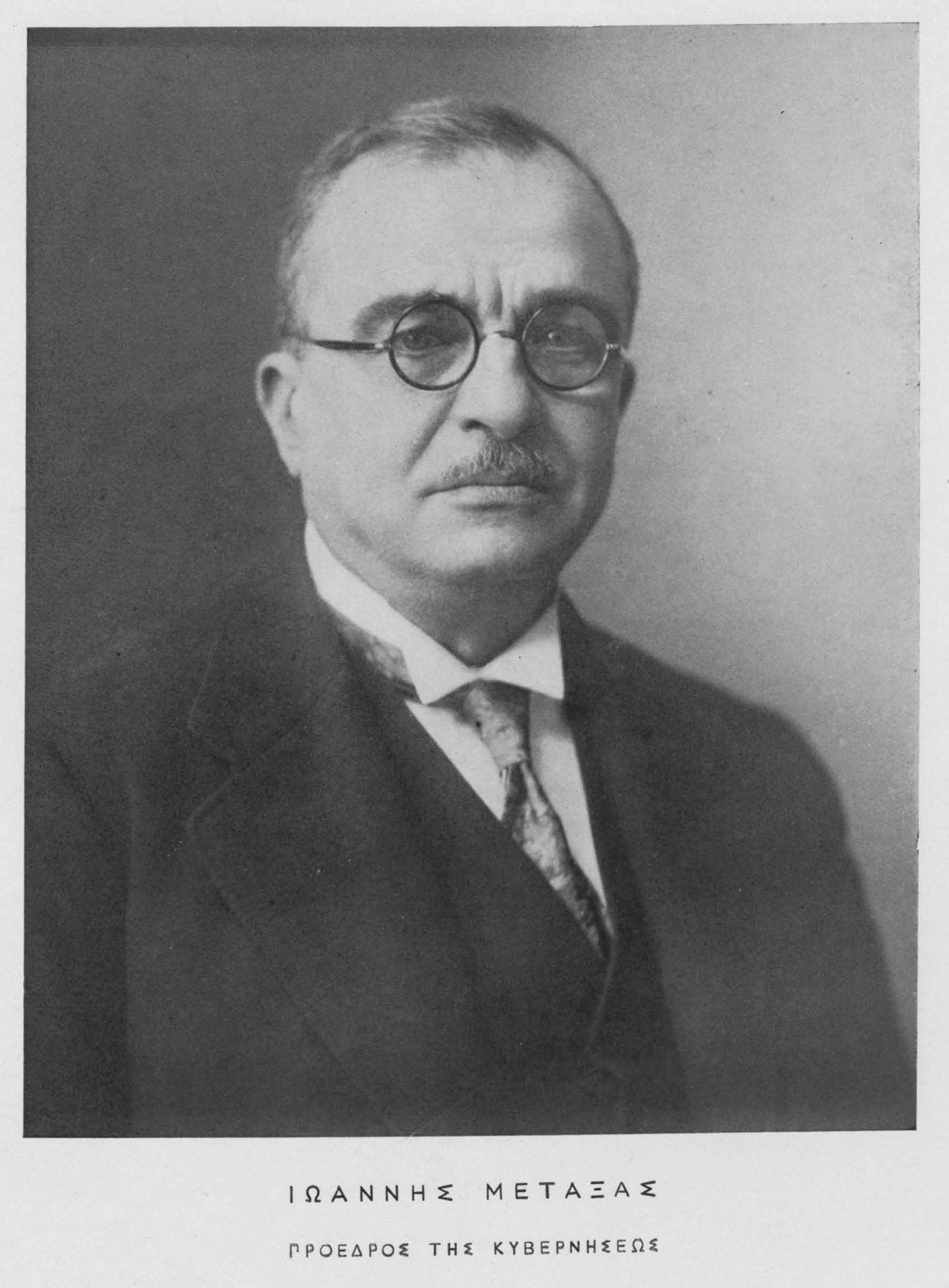
Ioannis Metaxas

The far right in Greece first came to power under the ideology of Metaxism, a proto-fascist ideology developed by dictator Ioannis Metaxas. Metaxism called for the regeneration of the Greek nation and the establishment of an ethnically homogeneous state. Metaxism disparaged liberalism, and held individual interests to be subordinate to those of the nation, seeking to mobilize the Greek people as a disciplined mass in service to the creation of a "new Greece".

The Metaxas government and its official doctrines are often compared to conventional totalitarian-conservative dictatorships such as Francisco Franco's Spain or António de Oliveira Salazar's Portugal. The Metaxist government derived its authority from the conservative establishment and its doctrines strongly supported traditional institutions such as the Greek Orthodox Church and the Greek Royal Family; essentially reactionary, it lacked the radical theoretical dimensions of ideologies such as Italian Fascism and German Nazism.

===== Axis occupation of Greece and aftermath =====
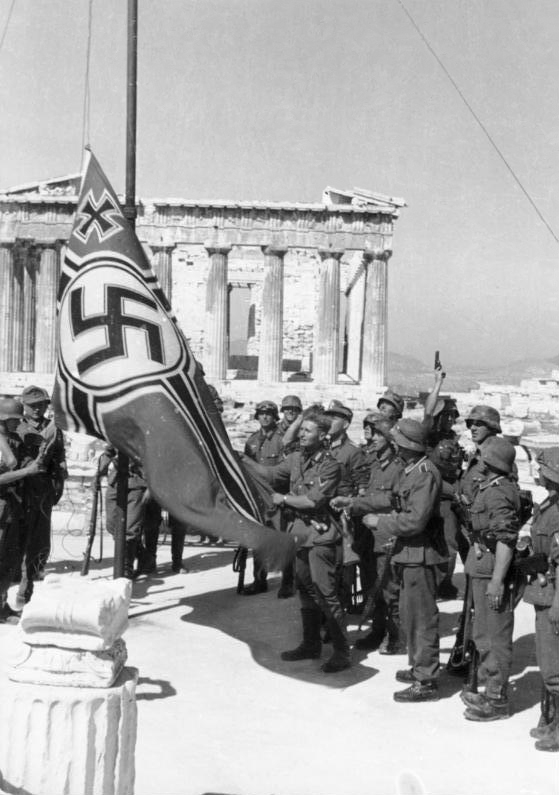
German soldiers in 1941 raising the German War Flag over the Acropolis which would be taken down by Manolis Glezos and Apostolos Santas in one of the first acts of resistance

The Metaxis regime came to an end after the Axis powers invaded Greece. The Axis occupation of Greece began in April 1941. The occupation ruined the Greek economy and brought about terrible hardships for the Greek civilian population. The Jewish population of Greece was nearly eradicated. Of its pre-war population of 75–77,000, only around 11–12,000 survived, either by joining the resistance or being hidden. Following the short-lived interim government of Georgios Papandreou, the military seized power in Greece during the 1967 Greek coup d'état, replacing the interim government with the right-wing United States-backed Greek junta. The Junta was a series of military juntas that ruled Greece from 1967 to 1974. The dictatorship was characterized by right-wing cultural policies, restrictions on civil liberties and the imprisonment, torture and exile of political opponents. The junta's rule ended on 24 July 1974 under the pressure of the Turkish invasion of Cyprus, leading to the Metapolitefsi ("regime change") to democracy and the establishment of the Third Hellenic Republic.

Until 2019, the dominant far-right party in Greece in the 21st century was the neo-Nazi and Mataxist inspired Golden Dawn. At the May 2012 Greek legislative election, Golden Dawn won 21 seats in the Hellenic Parliament, receiving 6.97% of the vote. It became the third largest party in the Greek Parliament with 17 seats after the January 2015 election, winning 6.28% of the vote.

Founded by Nikolaos Michaloliakos, Golden Dawn had its origins in the movement that worked towards a return to right-wing military dictatorship in Greece. Following an investigation into the 2013 murder of Pavlos Fyssas, an anti-fascist rapper, by a supporter of the party, Michaloliakos and several other Golden Dawn parliamentarians and members were arrested and held in pre-trial detention on suspicion of forming a criminal organization. The trial began on 20 April 2015 and eventually led to the conviction of 7 of its leaders for heading a criminal organization and 61 other defendants for participating in a criminal organization. Guilty verdicts on charges of murder, attempted murder, and violent attacks on immigrants and left-wing political opponents were also delivered and prison sentences of a combined total of over 500 years were handed out.

Golden Dawn later lost all of its remaining seats in the Greek Parliament in the 2019 Greek legislative election, and a 2020 survey showed the party's popularity plummeting to just 1.5%, down from 2.9% in previous year's elections. This means that the largest party in Greece that is considered right wing to far right is Greek Solution, which has been described as ideologically ultranationalist and right-wing populist. The party garnered 3.7% of the vote in the 2019 Greek legislative election, winning 10 out of the 300 seats in the Hellenic Parliament and 4.18% of the vote in the 2019 European Parliament election in Greece, winning one seat in the European Parliament.

==== Italy ====
The far right has maintained a continuous political presence in Italy since the fall of Mussolini. The neo-fascist party Italian Social Movement (1946–1995), influenced by the previous Italian Social Republic (1943–1945), became one of the chief reference points for the European far-right from the end of World War II until the late 1980s.

Silvio Berlusconi and his Forza Italia party dominated politics from 1994. According to some scholars, it gave neo-fascism a new respectability. Caio Giulio Cesare Mussolini, great-grandson of Benito Mussolini, stood for the 2019 European Parliament election as a member of the far right Brothers of Italy party. In 2011, it was estimated that the neo-fascist CasaPound party had 5,000 members. The name is derived from the fascist poet Ezra Pound. It has also been influenced by the Manifesto of Verona, the Labour Charter of 1927 and social legislation of fascism. There has been collaboration between CasaPound and the identitarian movement.

The European migrant crisis has become an increasingly divisive issue in Italy. Interior Minister Matteo Salvini has been courting far-right voters. His Northern League party has become an anti-immigrant, nationalist movement. Both parties are using Mussolini nostalgia to further their aims.

==== Netherlands ====
Despite being neutral, the Netherlands was invaded by Nazi Germany on 10 May 1940 as part of Fall Gelb. About 70% of the country's Jewish population were killed during the occupation, a much higher percentage than comparable countries such as Belgium and France. Most of the south of the country was liberated in the second half of 1944. The rest, especially the west and north of the country still under occupation, suffered from a famine at the end of 1944 known as the Hunger Winter. On 5 May 1945, the whole country was finally liberated by the total surrender of all German forces. Since the end of World War II, the Netherlands has had a number of small far-right groups and parties, the largest and most successful being the Party for Freedom led by Geert Wilders. Other far-right Dutch groups include the neo-Nazi Dutch People's Union (1973–present), the Centre Party (1982–1986), the Centre Party '86 (1986–1998), the Dutch Block (1992–2000), New National Party (1998–2005), the ultranationalist National Alliance (2003–2007). and various overlapping Defend groups (2021–present)

==== Poland ====
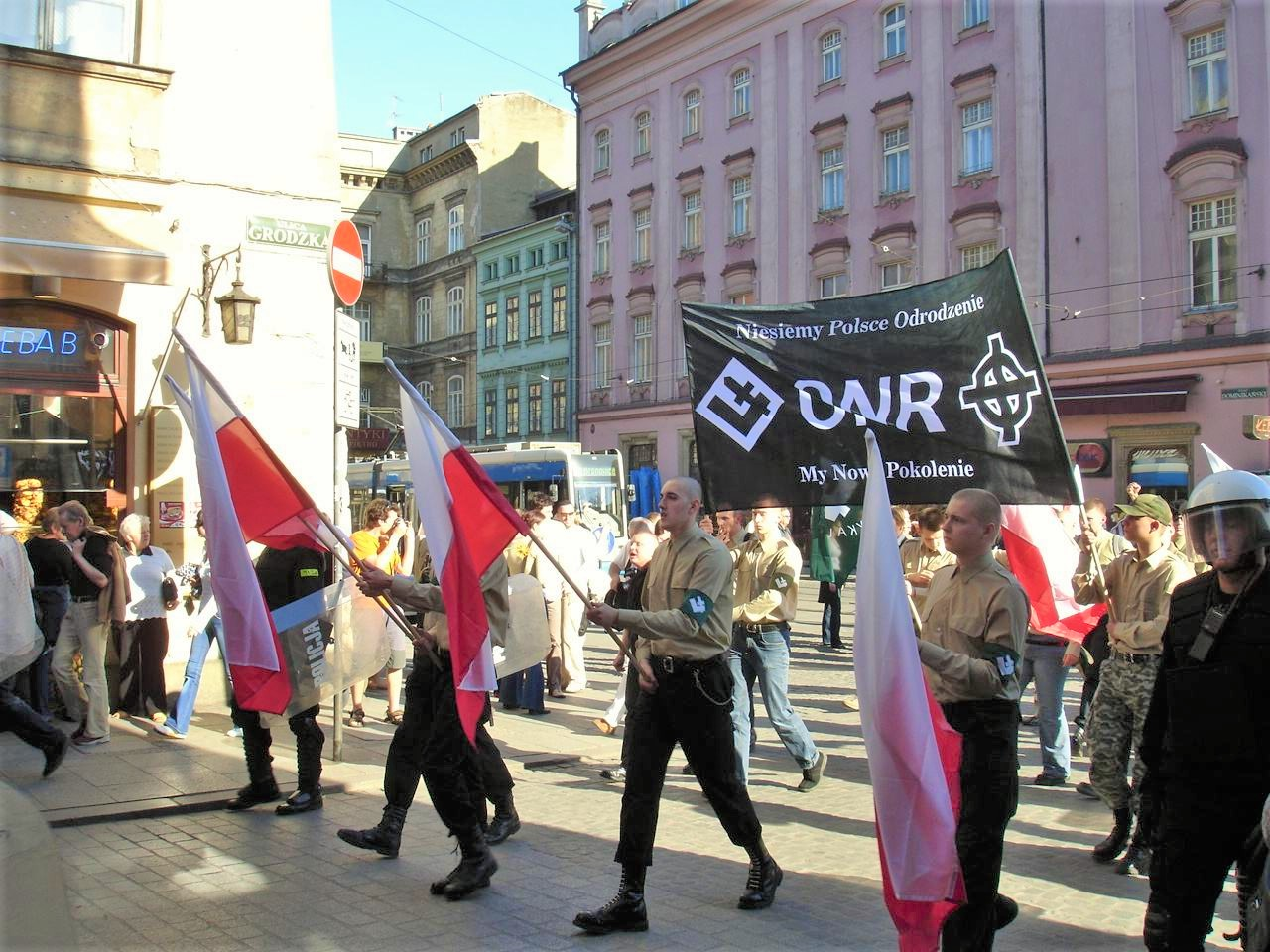
National Radical Camp march in Kraków, July 2007

Following the collapse of Communist Poland, a number of far-right groups came to prominence including The National Revival of Poland, the European National Front, the Association for Tradition and Culture "Niklot". The All-Polish Youth and National Radical Camp were recreated in 1989 and 1993, respectively becoming Poland's most prominent far-right organizations. In 1995, the Anti-Defamation League estimated the number of far-right and white power skinheads in Poland at 2,000. Since late 2000s smaller fascist groups have merged to form the neo-Nazi Autonome Nationalisten. A number of far-right parties have run candidates in elections including the League of Polish Families, the National Movement with limited success.

In 2019, the Confederation Liberty and Independence earned 1,256,953 votes which was 6.81% of the total vote in an election that saw a historically high turnout. Members of far-right groups make up a significant portion of those taking part in the annual Independence March in central Warsaw which started in 2009 to mark Independence Day. About 60,000 were in the 2017 march marking the 99th anniversary of independence, with placards such as "Clean Blood" seen on the march. Law and Justice, the previous governing party of Poland, has sometimes been described as far-right, although it is also considered centre-right instead, or it is argued that the party is not far-right, with political scientist Michael Minkerberg arguing that the party is "not a radical right party but right-wing populist".

==== Romania ====
The preeminent far-right party in Romania is the Greater Romania Party, founded in 1991 by Tudor, who was formerly known as a "court poet" of Communist dictator Nicolae Ceaușescu and his literary mentor, the writer Eugen Barbu, one year after Tudor launched the România Mare weekly magazine, which remains the most important propaganda tool of the PRM. Tudor subsequently launched a companion daily newspaper called Tricolorul. The historical expression Greater Romania refers to the idea of recreating the former Kingdom of Romania which existed during the interwar period. Having been the largest entity to bear the name of Romania, the frontiers were marked with the intent of uniting most territories inhabited by ethnic Romanians into a single country and it is now a rallying cry for Romanian nationalists. Due to internal conditions under Communist Romania after World War II, the expression's use was forbidden in publications until after the Romanian Revolution in 1989. The party's initial success was partly attributed to the deep rootedness of Ceaușescu's national communism in Romania.

Both the ideology and the main political focus of the Greater Romania Party are reflected in frequently strongly nationalistic articles written by Tudor. The party has called for the outlawing of the ethnic Hungarian party, the Democratic Union of Hungarians in Romania, for allegedly plotting the secession of Transylvania.

==== Russia ====
The period of development of Russian fascism in the 1930s–1940s was characterized by sympathy for Italian fascism and German Nazism and pronounced anti-communism and antisemitism.

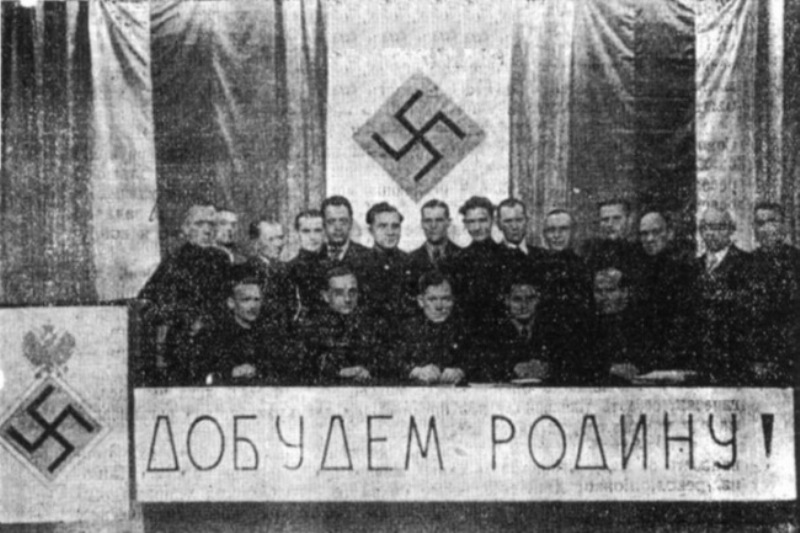
The Russian Fascist Party in the first half of the 20th century. The slogan "Let's get our homeland!" is also used by the modern far-right in Russia.

Russian fascism has its roots in the movements known in history as the Black Hundreds and the White movement. It was distributed among white émigré circles living in Germany, Manchukuo, and the United States. In Germany and the United States (unlike Manchukuo), they practically did not conduct political activity, limiting themselves to the publication of newspapers and brochures.

Some ideologues of the white movement, such as Ivan Ilyin and Vasily Shulgin, welcomed the coming to power of Mussolini in Italy and Hitler in Germany, offering their comrades-in-arms the fascist "method" as a way to fight socialism, communism, and godlessness. At the same time, they did not deny fascist political repression and antisemitism and even justified them.

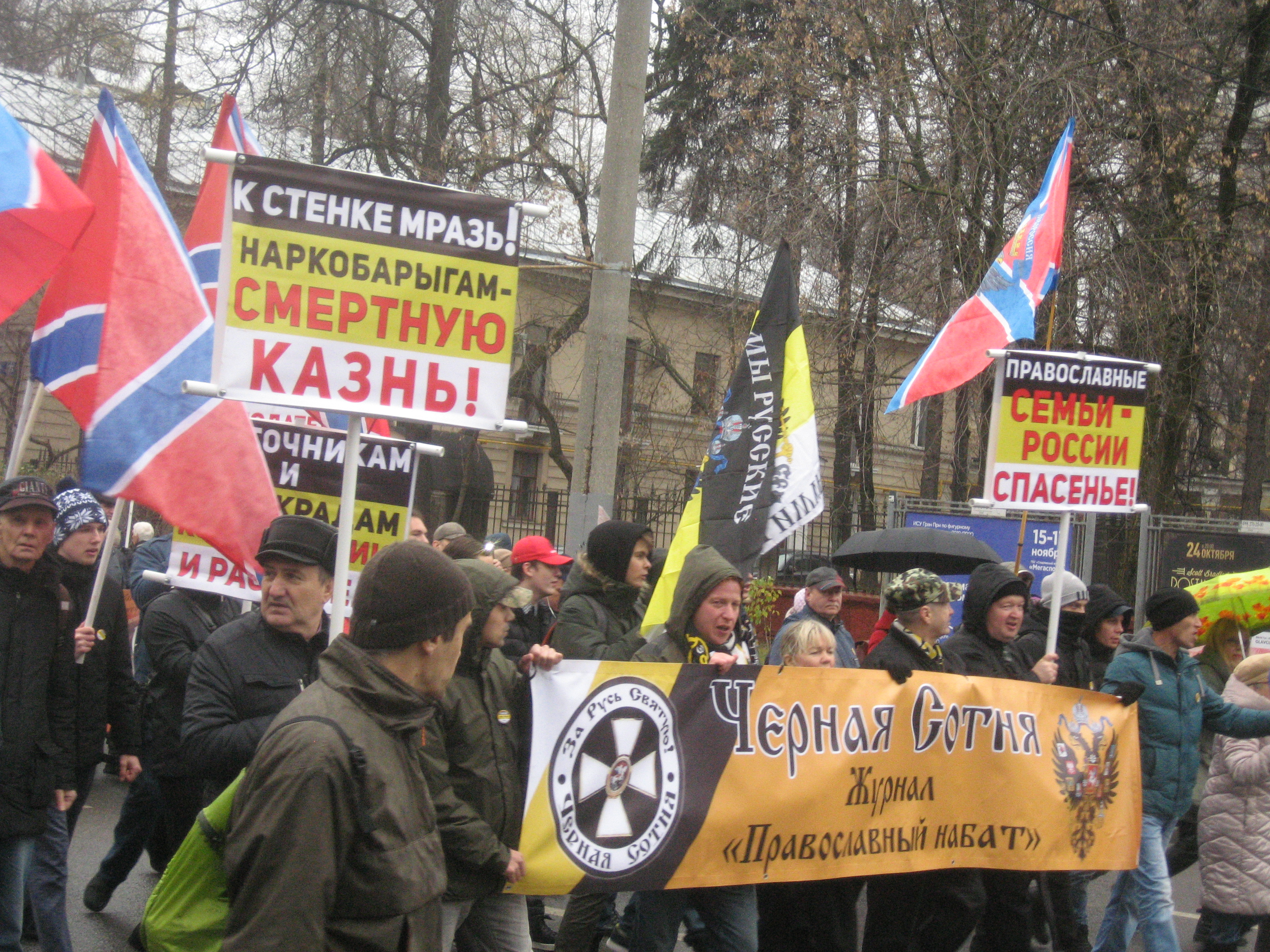
Far right Russian demonstration

With the outbreak of World War II, Russian fascists in Germany supported Nazi Germany and joined the ranks of Russian collaborators.

Some Russian neo-Nazi organizations are part of the international World Union of National Socialists (WUNS, founded in 1962). As of 2012, six Russian organizations are among the officially registered members of the union: National Resistance, National Socialist Movement – Russian Division, All-Russian Public Patriotic Movement "Russian National Unity", National Socialist Movement "Slavic Union" (prohibited by a court decision in June 2010), and others. The following organizations are not included in WUNS: the National Socialist Society (banned by a court decision in 2010), the Russian All-National Union (banned in September 2011), and others, such as skinheads: Legion Werewolf (liquidated in 1996), Schultz-88 (liquidated in 2006), White Wolves (liquidated in 2008–2010), New Order (ceased to exist), Russian goal (ceased to exist), and others. Some of the more radical neo-Nazi organizations, using terrorist methods, belonged to skinhead groups such as the Werewolf Legion (liquidated in 1996), Schultz-88 (liquidated in 2006), White Wolves (liquidated in 2008–2010), New Order (ceased to exist), "Russian Goal" (ceased to exist), and others.

Until the end of the 1990s, one of the largest parties of Russian national extremists was the neo-Nazi socio-political movement "Russian National Unity" (RNE), founded by Alexander Barkashov in 1990. At the end of 1999, the RNE made an unsuccessful attempt to take part in the elections to the State Duma. Barkashov considered "true Orthodoxy" as a fusion of Christianity with paganism and advocated the "Russian God" and the "Aryan swastika" allegedly associated with it. He wrote about the Atlanteans, the Etruscans, and the "Aryan" civilization as the direct predecessors of the Russian nation, in a centuries-old struggle with the "Semites", the "world Jewish conspiracy", and the "dominance of the Jews in Russia". The symbol of the movement was a modified swastika. Barkashov was a parishioner of the "True Orthodox ("Catacomb") Church", and the first cells of the RNE were formed as brotherhoods and communities of the RTOC.

The ideology of Russian neo-Nazism is closely connected with the ideology of Slavic neo-paganism (rodnovery). In a number of cases, there are also organizational ties between neo-Nazis and neo-pagans. One of the founders of Russian neo-paganism, the former dissident Alexey Dobrovolsky (pagan name – Dobroslav) shared the ideas of Nazism and transferred them to his neo-pagan teaching. Modern Russian neo-paganism took shape in the second half of the 1970s and is associated with the activities of Dobrovolsky and Moscow Arabist Valery Yemelyanov (neo-pagan name – Velemir), both supporters of antisemitism. Rodnoverie is a popular religion among Russian skinheads. These skinheads, however, do not usually practice their religion.

Historian Dmitry Shlapentokh wrote that, as in Europe, neo-paganism in Russia pushes some of its adherents to antisemitism. This antisemitism is closely related to negative attitudes towards Asians, and this emphasis on racial factors can lead neo-pagans to neo-Nazism. The tendency of neo-pagans to antisemitism is a logical development of the ideas of neo-paganism and imitation of the Nazis, and is also a consequence of a number of specific conditions of modern Russian politics. Unlike previous regimes, the modern Russian political regime, as well as the ideology of the middle class, combines support for Orthodoxy with philosemitism and a positive attitude towards Muslims. These features of the regime contributed to the formation of specific views of neo-Nazi neo-pagans, which are represented to a large extent among the socially unprotected and marginalized Russian youth. In their opinion, power in Russia was usurped by a cabal of conspirators, including hierarchs of the Orthodox Church, Jews, and Muslims. Contrary to external differences, it is believed that these forces have united in their desire to maintain power over the Russian "Aryans".

==== Serbia ====
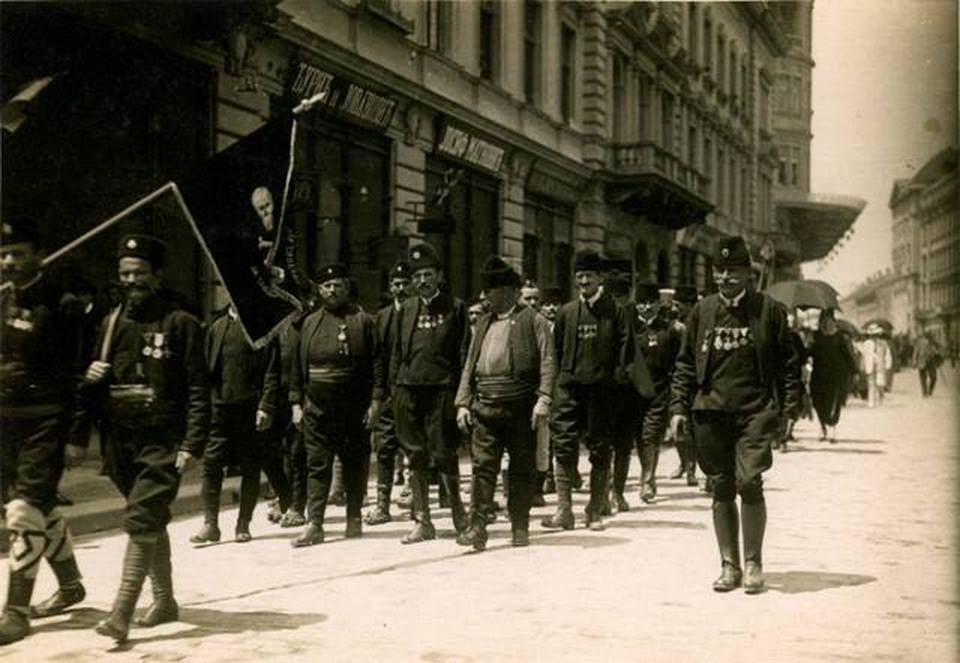
Chetniks in Belgrade, 1920

In the Kingdom of Yugoslavia, multiple far-right organizations and parties operated during the late Interwar period such as the Yugoslav National Movement (Zbor), Yugoslav Radical Union (JRZ) and Organization of Yugoslav Nationalists (ORJUNA). Zbor was headed by Dimitrije Ljotić, who during the World War II collaborated with the Axis powers. Ljotić was a supporter of Italian fascism, and he advocated for the establishment of a centralized Yugoslav state that would be dominated by Serbs, and a return to Christian traditions. Zbor was the only registered political party in Yugoslavia that openly promoted antisemitism and xenophobia. JRZ was registered as a political party in 1934 by Milan Stojadinović, a right-wing politician who expressed his support towards Italian fascism during his premiership. JRZ was initially a coalition made up of Stojadinović's, Anton Korošec's and Mehmed Spaho's supporters, and the party was the main stronghold for Yugoslav ethnic nationalists and supporters of Karađorđević dynasty. ORJUNA was a prominent organization in the 1920s that was influenced by fascism. During World War II, Chetniks, an ethnic ultranationalist movement rose to prominence. Chetniks were staunchly anti-communist and they supported monarchism and the creation of a Greater Serbian state. They, including their leader Draža Mihailović, extensively collaborated with the Axis powers in the second half of the World War II against their common enemy, the Yugoslav Partisans.

After the re-establishment of the multi-party system in Serbia in 1990, multiple right-wing movements and parties began getting popularity from which the Serbian Radical Party was the most successful. Vojislav Šešelj, who founded the party, promoted popular notions of "international conspiracy against the Serbs" during the 1990s which gained him popularity in the 1992 and 1997 election. During the 1990s, SRS has been also described as neofascist due to their vocal support of ethnic ultranationalism and irredentism. Its popularity went into decline after the 2008 election when its acting leader Tomislav Nikolić seceded from the party to form the Serbian Progressive Party. Besides SRS, during the 2000s multiple neofascist and Neo-Nazi movements began getting popular, such as Nacionalni stroj, Obraz and 1389 Movement. Dveri, an organization turned political party, was also a prominent promoter of far-right content, and they were mainly known for their clerical-fascist, socially conservative and anti-Western stances. Since 2019, the far-right Serbian Party Oathkeepers has gained popularity mainly due to their ultranationalist views, including the openly neofascist Leviathan Movement.

==== Slovenia ====
There are multiple groups and organisations within Slovenia which are or have been engaged in far-right political activity, and right-wing extremism. Their political activity has traditionally opposed and targeted socially progressive policies, and minorities (in particular; the LGBT community, and ethnic minorities like the Roma and immigrants (particularly those from the Southern Balkans), and espoused traditional ultraconservative and reactionary views and values. More recently, a rise in new, incipient alt-right groups has been noted, particularly as a reaction to the European migrant crisis.

==== Spain ====
The history of the far-right in Spain dates back to at least the 1800s and refers to any manifestation of far-right politics in Spain. Individuals and organizations associated with the far-right in Spain often employ reactionary traditionalism, religious fundamentalism, corporate Catholicism, and fascism in their ideological practice. In the case of Spain, according to historian Pedro Carlos González Cuevas, the predominance of Catholicism played an essential role in the suppression of external political innovations such as Social Darwinism, positivism, and vitalism in Spanish far-right politics.

==== Switzerland ====
The Swiss People's Party, one of the leading right-wing parties in Switzerland, is widely described as far-right.

==== United Kingdom ====
The British far-right rose out of the fascist movement. In 1932, Oswald Mosley founded the British Union of Fascists (BUF) which was banned during World War II. Founded in 1954 by A. K. Chesterton, the League of Empire Loyalists became the main British far-right group at the time. It was a pressure group rather than a political party, and did not contest elections. Most of its members were part of the Conservative Party and were known for politically embarrassing stunts at party conferences. Other fascist parties included the White Defence League and the National Labour Party who merged in 1960 to form the second British National Party (BNP).

With the decline of the British Empire becoming inevitable, British far-right parties turned their attention to internal matters. The 1950s had seen an increase in immigration to the UK from its former colonies, particularly India, Pakistan, the Caribbean and Uganda. Led by John Bean and Andrew Fountaine, the BNP opposed the admittance of these people to the UK. A number of its rallies such as one in 1962 in Trafalgar Square ended in race riots. After a few early successes, the party got into difficulties and was destroyed by internal arguments. In 1967 it joined forces with John Tyndall and the remnants of Chesterton's League of Empire Loyalists to form Britain's largest far-right organization, the National Front (NF). The BNP and the NF supported extreme loyalism in Northern Ireland, and attracted Conservative Party members who had become disillusioned after Harold Macmillan had recognized the right to independence of the African colonies and had criticized Apartheid in South Africa.

Some Northern Irish loyalist paramilitaries have links with far-right and neo-Nazi groups in Britain, including Combat 18, the British National Socialist Movement and the NF. In 2004, The Guardian reported that loyalist paramilitaries had been responsible for numerous racist attacks in loyalist areas. During the 1970s, the NF's rallies became a regular feature of British politics. Election results remained strong in a few working-class urban areas, with a number of local council seats won, but the party never came anywhere near winning representation in parliament.

British National Party (BNP) vote share in the 2010 UK general election

Since the 1970s, the NF's support has been in decline whilst Nick Griffin and the current British National Party (BNP) grew in popularity. Around the turn of the 21st century, the BNP won a number of council seats. At its peak in the late 2000s, the party had 54 local council seats, one seat in the London Assembly, two seats in the European Parliament, and were the official opposition in the Barking and Dagenham London Borough Council. The party received almost a million votes in the 2009 European Parliament elections, and contested the majority of UK parliamentary seats in the 2010 general election. The party's membership was 12,632 and its financial resources were an estimated £1,983,947. The BNP would record their highest ever vote in a general election with half a million or 1.9% of the popular vote. This is the highest ever vote for a British Far-right party.

By the early 2010s the BNP saw its support and membership quickly collapse due to internal divisions caused by a disappointing performance in the 2010 elections. Griffin was ousted as leader in 2014 after losing his European Parliament seat, and since then the party has been in terminal decline under the leadership of Adam Walker.

A number of breakaway groups have been established by former members of the BNP, such as Britain First by ex-councillor Paul Golding, the British Democrats by ex-MEP and leadership candidate Andrew Brons, as well as Patriotic Alternative by Mark Collett. UK Independence Party (UKIP) leader Nigel Farage claimed that his party absorbed much of the BNP's former voters during their electoral peak in the early 2010s. The party was accused of shifting towards far-right, anti-Islam politics under the leadership of Paul Nuttall and Gerard Batten during its decline in the late 2010s. Anti-Islam activist and former UKIP leadership candidate Anne Marie Waters established the far-right For Britain Movement, which gained a small number of ex-BNP councillors. It was deregistered in 2022, and subsequently a large portion of prominent far-right activists began coalescing around the British Democrats, which (following UKIP's loss of its few councillors on 4 May 2023, leaving it with only a few parish and town councillors) quickly established itself as the UK's only far-right party with any electoral representation.

=== Oceania ===
==== Australia ====
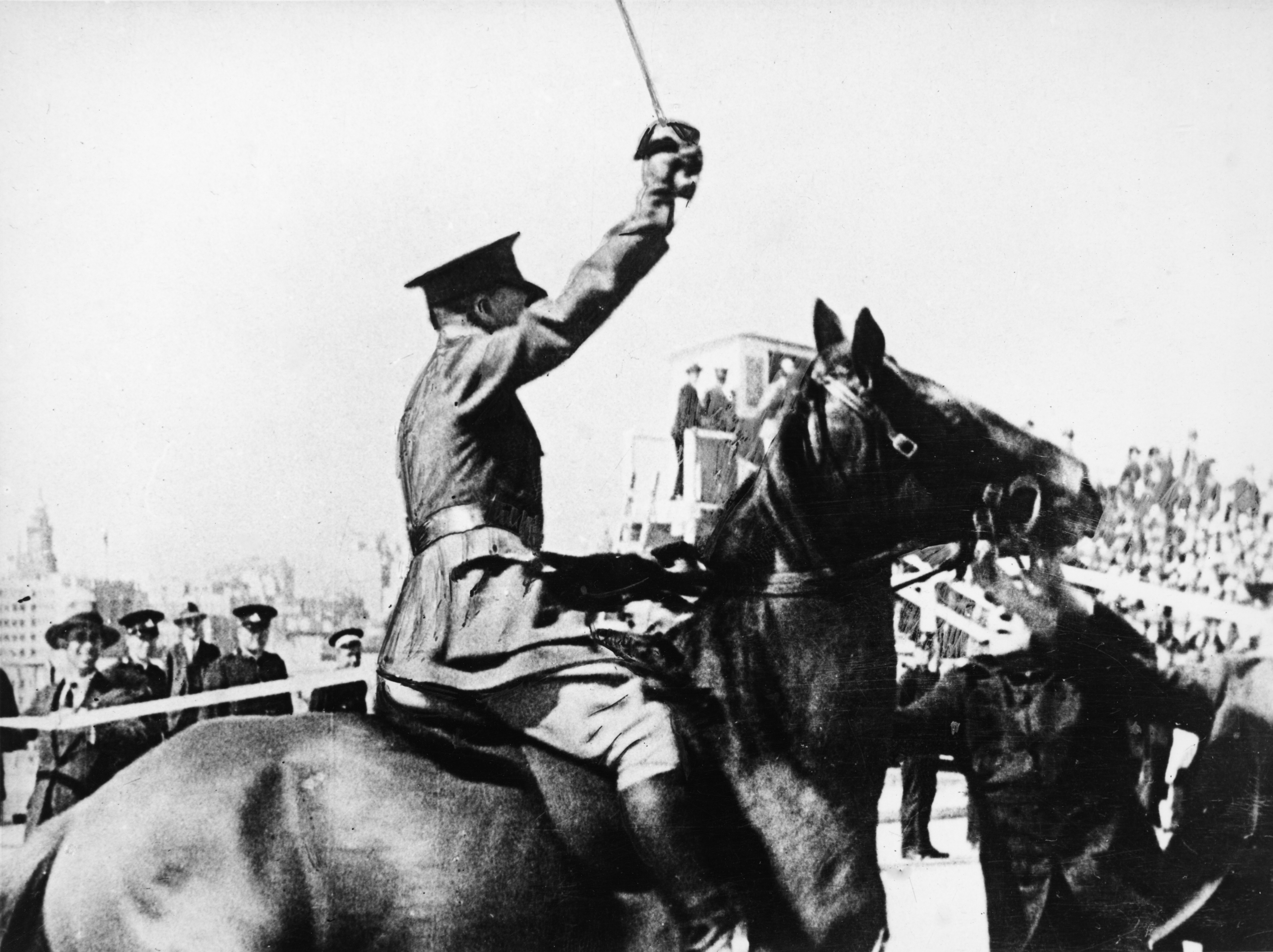
Captain Francis de Groot declares the Sydney Harbour Bridge open in March 1932.

Coming to prominence in Sydney with the formation of the New Guard (1931) and the Centre Party (1933), the far right has played a part in Australian political discourse since the second world war. These proto-fascist groups were monarchist, anti-communist and authoritarian in nature. Early far-right groups were followed by the explicitly fascist Australia First Movement (1941). The far right in Australia went on to acquire more explicitly racial connotations during the 1960s and 1970s, morphing into self-proclaimed Nazi, fascist and antisemitic movements, organizations that opposed non-white and non-Christian immigration such as the neo-Nazi National Socialist Party of Australia (1967) and the militant white supremacist group National Action (1982).

Since the 1980s, the term has mainly been used to describe those who express the wish to preserve what they perceive to be Judeo-Christian, White/European or Anglo-Australian culture and those who campaign against Aboriginal land rights, multiculturalism, immigration and asylum seekers. Since 2001, Australia has seen the development of modern neo-Nazi, neo-fascist or alt-right groups such as the True Blue Crew, the United Patriots Front, Fraser Anning's Conservative National Party and the Antipodean Resistance.

==== New Zealand ====
A small number of far-right organizations have existed in New Zealand since World War II, including the Conservative Front, the New Zealand National Front and the National Democrats Party. Far-right parties in New Zealand lack significant support, with their protests often dwarfed by counter protest. After the Christchurch mosque shootings in 2019, the National Front "publicly shut up shop" and largely went underground like other far-right groups.

==== Fiji ====
===== Nationalist Vanua Tako Lavo Party =====
The Nationalist Vanua Tako Lavo Party was a far-right political party which advocated Fijian ethnic nationalism. In 2009, party leader Iliesa Duvuloco was arrested for breaching the military regime's emergency laws by distributing pamphlets calling for an uprising against the military regime. In January 2013, the military regime introduced regulations that essentially de-registered the party.

=== Pan-national ===
==== European Union ====
The development of a Pan-European identity among far-right members of the European parliament has been claimed.

==== Islamic extremism ====
Some Islamic extremists view Islam superior to all other ideologies and non-Muslims as inferior. Some Islamic extremism can be seen as far-right, and can have some social acceptance in some countries. Dhimmi refers to the inferior status of non-Muslims in some historic Islamic states.

== Online ==
A number of far-right internet pages and forums are focused on and frequented by the far right. These include Stormfront and Iron March.

Far-right internet movements gained popularity and notoriety online in 2012, and this has not stopped. In the United States, they gained many followers during and after the 2016 presidential election.

=== Stormfront ===
Stormfront is the oldest and most prominent neo-Nazi website, described by the Southern Poverty Law Center and other media organizations as the "murder capital of the internet". In August 2017, Stormfront was taken offline for just over a month when its registrar seized its domain name due to complaints that it promoted hatred and that some of its members were linked to murder. The Lawyers' Committee for Civil Rights Under Law claimed credit for the action after advocating for Stormfront's web host, Network Solutions, to enforce its Terms of Service agreement which prohibits users from using its services to incite violence.

=== Iron March ===
Iron March was a fascist web forum founded in 2011 by Russian nationalist Alexander "Slavros" Mukhitdinov. An unknown individual uploaded a database of Iron March users to the Internet Archive in November 2019 and multiple neo-Nazi users were identified, including an ICE detention center captain and several active members of the United States Armed Forces. As of mid 2018, the Southern Poverty Law Center linked Iron March to nearly 100 murders. Mukhitdinov remained a murky figure at the time of the leaks.

=== Terrorgram ===
The Terrorgram community on Telegram is a network of Telegram channels and accounts that subscribe to and promote militant accelerationism. Terrorgram channels are neofascist in ideology, and regularly share instructions and manuals on how to carry out acts of racially motivated violence and anti-government, anti-authority terrorism. In 2021, the Institute for Strategic Dialogue (ISD), an international think-tank, exposed more than two hundred neo-Nazi pro-terrorism telegram channels that make up the Terrorgram network, many of which contained instructions to build weapons and bombs.

== Right-wing terrorism ==
From 2013 through 2022 75% of extremist killings in the U.S. were caused by right-wing perpetrators. From 2022 through 2024, all 61 political killings were committed by right-wing extremists.

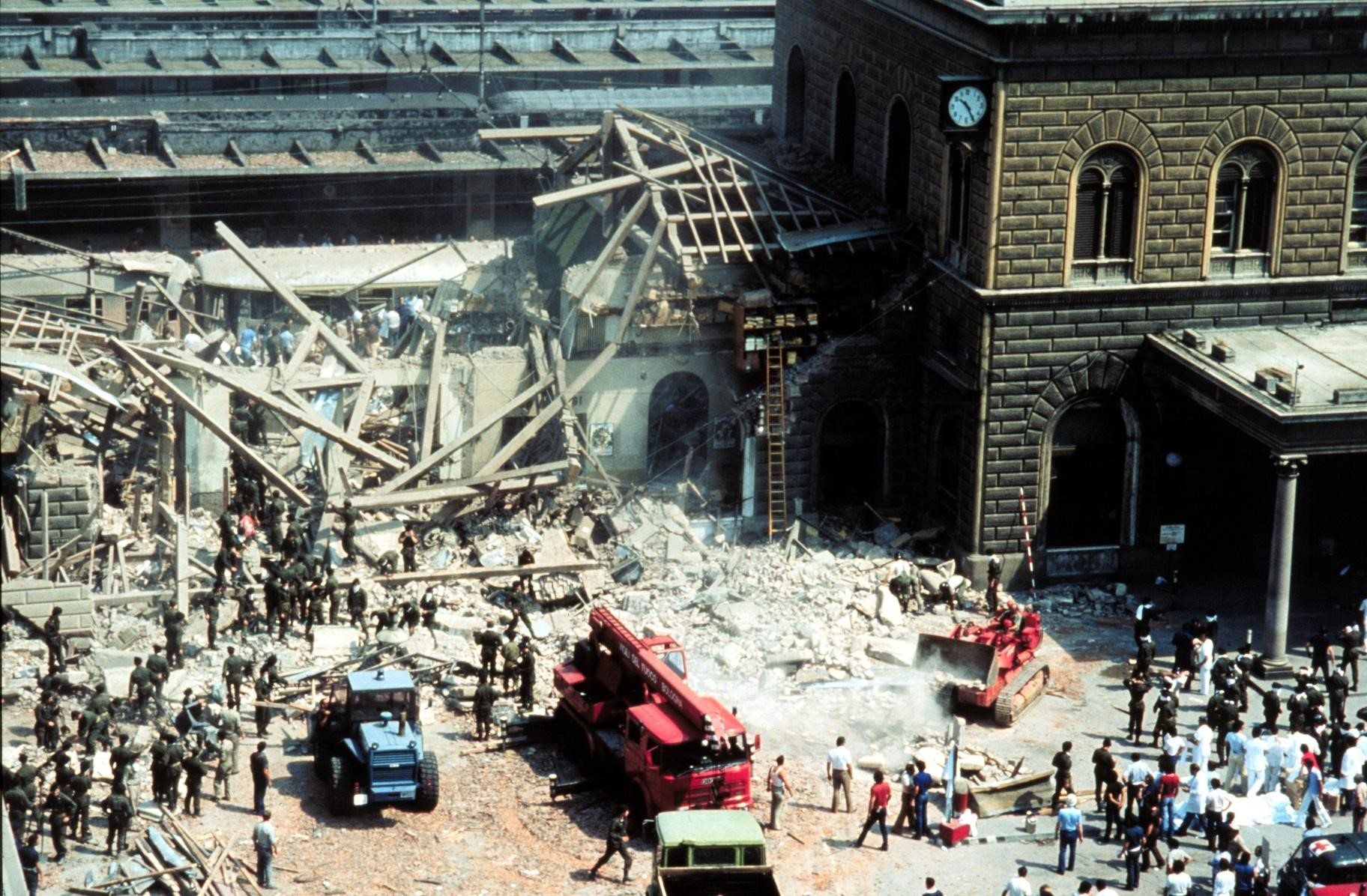
The 1980 Bologna massacre by Nuclei Armati Rivoluzionari

Right-wing terrorism is terrorism motivated by a variety of far right ideologies and beliefs, including anti-communism, neo-fascism, neo-Nazism, racism, xenophobia and opposition to immigration. This type of terrorism has been sporadic, with little or no international cooperation. Modern right-wing terrorism first appeared in western Europe in the 1980s and it first appeared in Eastern Europe following the dissolution of the Soviet Union.

Right-wing terrorists aim to overthrow governments and replace them with nationalist or fascist-oriented governments. The core of this movement includes neo-fascist skinheads, far-right hooligans, youth sympathizers and intellectual guides who believe that the state must rid itself of foreign elements in order to protect rightful citizens. However, they usually lack a rigid ideology.

According to Cas Mudde, far-right terrorism and violence in the West have been generally perpetrated in recent times by individuals or groups of individuals "who have at best a peripheral association" with politically relevant organizations of the far right. Nevertheless, Mudde follows, "in recent years far-right violence has become more planned, regular, and lethal, as terrorists attacks in Christchurch (2019), Pittsburgh (2018), and Norway (2011) show."

== See also ==
- Antifeminism
- European New Right
- Far-left politics
- History of the far-right in Spain
- Manosphere
- Religious exclusivism
- Right-wing authoritarianism
- White ethnostate
- White power
- French anti-Southern sentiment during the Third Republic
