= Public Eye Network =

Progressive investigative group founded in the 1970s in the United States

The Public Eye Network is a group of progressive investigative reporters, licensed investigators, paralegal investigators, attorneys, and activists who share information about political repression and right-wing movements that undermine civil liberties and civil rights. It was formed in the 1970s from three pre-existing groups, the editors of The Public Eye, the magazine sponsoring organization, the Repression Information Project (RIP), and the Guild Investigative Group. Several people who worked as editors or volunteer staff at CounterSpy Magazine joined the network.

The original editors of The Public Eye were Harvey Kahn and Mark Ryter. The magazine was a project of the Repression Information Project, staffed by Russ Bellant, Susan Gluss, Eda Gordon, Harvey Kahn, and Mark Ryter. The Guild Investigative Group (GIG) was formed as an investigative arm of the National Lawyers Guild to research penetration of the Guild by government agents and right-wing spies. The original investigators were Sheila O'Donnell and Eda Gordon.

The Public Eye Network maintains a website. The current coordinator is Sheila O'Donnell of Ace Investigations.
