= The Public Eye (magazine) =

Quarterly investigative magazine

- Categories: Political
- Frequency: Quarterly
- Publisher: Political Research Associates
- First issue: 1977
- Country: United States
- Based in: Somerville, Massachusetts, United States
- Language: English
- ISSN: 0275-9322 (print); 3143-7680 (web)
- OCLC: 27458041

The Public Eye is a magazine published by Political Research Associates in Somerville, Massachusetts. It is published quarterly. The magazine was founded in 1977 by the Public Eye Network. Before being associated with the PRA, it was associated with the National Lawyers Guild (NLG), a progressive lawyers' association with which PRA officer Chip Berlet was associated; it was for some years a semi-official periodical of the NLG. By the 2000s, its primary focus was on right-wing groups in the United States.

The original editors of the Public Eye Magazine were Harvey Kahn and Mark Ryter. The magazine was a publication of The Repression Information Project, a non-profit research center focusing on repression in the US, staffed by Russ Bellant, Susan Gluss, Eda Gordon, Harvey Kahn, and Mark Ryter.
