= History of the British National Party =

The British National Party (BNP) is a far-right political party in the United Kingdom formed as a splinter group from the National Front by John Tyndall in 1982 and was led by Nick Griffin from September 1999 to July 2014. Its current chairman is Adam Walker. The BNP platform is centred on the advocacy of "firm but voluntary incentives for immigrants and their descendants to return home", as well as the repeal of anti-discrimination legislation. It restricted membership to "indigenous British" people until a 2010 legal challenge to its constitution.

== Foundation (1982) ==
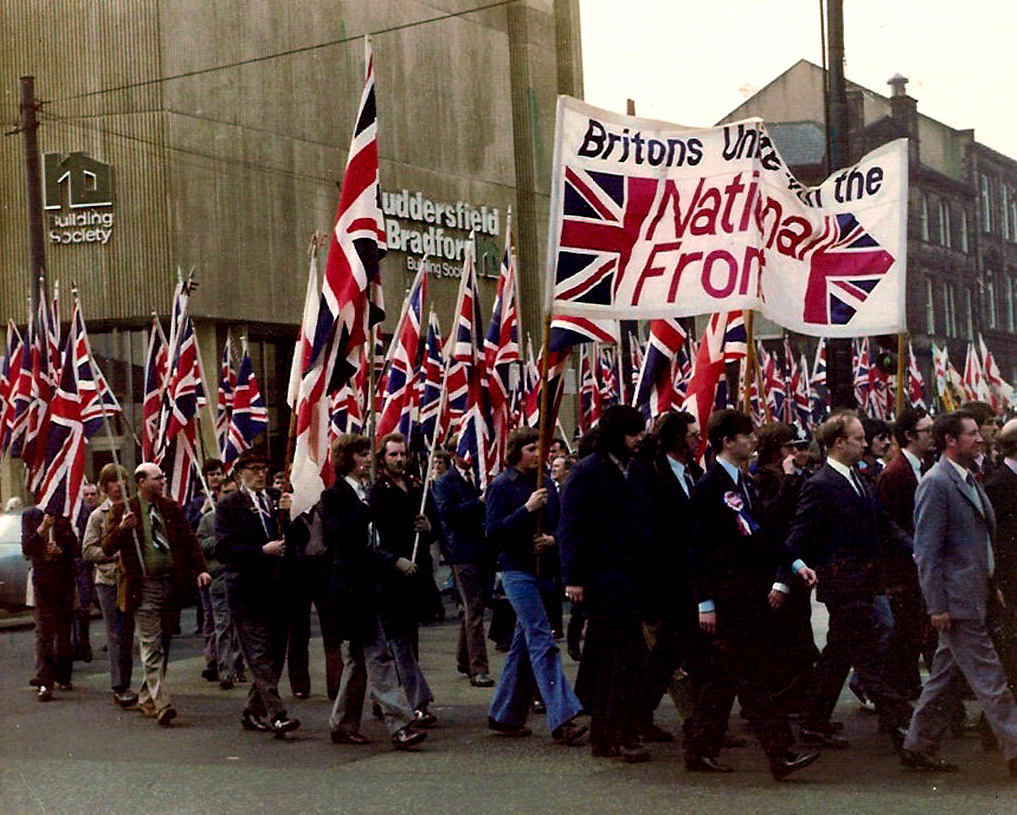
National Front march from the 1970s. The movement from which the BNP would emerge by 1982.

The British National Party (Note: The name British National Party had been used in politics by four organisations, most notably by the Mosleyite party which became the English National Association and by a 1960s party initiated by John Bean, which became part of the National Front. Tyndall was a leading member of the 1960s BNP and a founder of the present party.) was founded by the extreme-right political activist John Tyndall, who had been involved in neo-Nazi groups since the late 1950s. He had led the far-right National Front (NF) throughout most of the 1970s, although resigned in 1980, complaining that homosexuals like Martin Webster held senior positions within the party. He established his own rival group, the New National Front (NNF), in June 1980, hoping that his breakaway group could eventually be re-merged back into the NF. In January 1981, Tyndall was contacted by the far right activist Ray Hill, who was in reality a spy for the anti-fascist magazine Searchlight. Hill suggested that Tyndall establish a new political party through which he could unite many smaller extreme-right groups. While Hill's real intention had been to cause further schism among the British far right, Tyndall liked the idea. Tyndall made suggestions of unity to a number of other small extreme-right groups and together they established a Committee for Nationalist Unity (CNU) in January 1982. In March 1982, the CNU held a conference at the Charing Cross Hotel. The fifty extreme-rightists in attendance agreed that they would establish a new political party, to be known as the British National Party.

Tyndall was to be the leader of this new party, with the majority of its members coming from the NNF, although others were defectors from the NF, British Movement, British Democratic Party, and Nationalist Party. The party was formerly launched at a press conference held in a Victoria hotel on 7 April 1982. It was therefore dominated by ex-NF members and inherited that party's tradition of racial nationalism. Tyndall had led the NF on two occasions, and prior to that had been involved in several neo-Nazi groups, having been involved in the National Socialist Movement during the early 1960s and then founded his own Greater Britain Movement in 1964. Most of the BNP's leading activists, such as Charles Parker, David Bruce, Richard Edmonds, and John Peacock, had previously been senior figures in the NF. Tyndall later remarked that there was "scarcely any difference [between the BNP and NF] in ideology or policy save in the minutest detail". He described the party as being the third serious attempt to build such a movement in Britain, following those of the NF and Oswald Mosley's British Union of Fascists before that. Under Tyndall's leadership the party was neo-Nazi in orientation and engaged in nostalgia for Nazi Germany.

The British National Party (Note: The name British National Party had been used in politics previously by four organisations, most notably by the a Mosleyite party which became the English National Association and by a 1960s party initiated by John Bean, which became part of the National Front. Tyndall was a leading member of the 1960s BNP and a founder of the present party.) was founded in 1982 following a split within the far right National Front (NF) two years before. The NF had organised marches in an attempt to raise its profile, which sometimes led to violent clashes with political opponents such as the Anti-Nazi League. Following a poor showing at the 1979 general election, internal factional division heightened within the NF. This culminated in chairman John Tyndall leaving the party in 1980, and founding the New National Front (NNF), which became the BNP two years later. According to Spearhead, a magazine produced by Tyndall, the split within the NF was initially intended to be temporary. Members of Tyndall's NNF wished to modernise and break with fascism, blaming the old NF for its lack of popular appeal.

Tyndall's new BNP absorbed the membership of the British Democratic Party, a small British nationalist party led by Anthony Reed Herbert which was attempting to distance itself from neo-Nazism, and which had itself earlier split from the NF. Also joining were members of the Constitutional Movement, another NF splinter group who had distanced themselves from fascism and violent subcultures such as football hooliganism. These smaller nationalist parties attempting to modernise their image joined Tyndall's NNF through the Committee for Nationalist Unity (1981), which acted as a front to draw members from similar modernising nationalist organizations. However, despite Tyndall's attempt to distance the BNP from fascism, several individuals of the disintegrating British Movement were allowed to join. At its formation in 1982, the BNP had 2500 members, most of whom had joined from the Constitutional Movement through the Committee for Nationalist Unity. Eddy Morrison and his minor Leeds-based nationalist party merged with the BNP later that year.

== Early years (1983–1990) ==
Rather than seeking electoral victories, the BNP focused on long-term institutional growth. At the 1983 election, its membership was below 2000, and by 1988 this had dropped to 1000. It adopted a key tactic of the NF, that of street marches and rallies, believing that these attracted publicity and new recruits as well as boosting the morale of existing members. The BNP's first march took place in London to mark Saint George's Day 1982, with 400 to 500 activists in attendance. These marches often involved clashes with anti-fascist protesters and resulted in multiple arrests, thus cementing the connection between the BNP and both political violence and older fascist groups in the public eye. As a result, BNP organisers began to prefer holding indoor rallies, although street marches continued to be held throughout the mid-to-late 1980s. In 1986, Tyndall and John Morse were imprisoned for inciting racial hatred.

The BNP's early appearance in the electoral arena was "irregular and intermittent", and for the first twenty years of its existence, it faced consistent electoral failure. Such failure was shared by other neo-Nazi parties across Europe; while European populations were often highly critical of immigration, they were unlikely to endorse overt racial prejudice, and they rarely supported the idea of overthrowing the liberal democratic system of governance. When it did take part in elections, it was largely in the hope that the concomitant publicity would bring them new recruits. Throughout this period, the party suffered from low finances and personnel. In the 1983 general election it stood candidates in 54 seats although was only able to launch campaigns in five of them. Of these candidates, 40% had previously stood for the NF at the 1979 general election. The BNP gained 14,000 votes and averaged a vote share of 0.6% in the seats it had contested, however had been able to air a party political broadcast for the first time.

"Through the streets now we are marching
Like an army as to war
For the cause of race and nation,
With our banners to the fore.
Into battle, into battle, into battle BNP!
Into battle BNP!"

— BNP marching song, 1982

After the Representation of the People Act 1985 raised the cost of a candidate's electoral deposit to £500, the BNP adopted a policy of "very limited involvement" in elections. The party leadership also recognised that the rhetoric on restricting immigration then embraced by the Conservative Party government of Prime Minister Margaret Thatcher was likely to reduce their chances of success. Believing that a campaign would threaten the party's financial security, it officially abstained in the 1987 general election. In the 1992 general election the party stood 13 candidates. At the 1993 local elections, the BNP gained one council seat—won by Derek Beackon in the East London town of Millwall—after a campaign that targeted the anger of local whites over the perceived preferential treatment received by Bangladeshi migrants in social housing. However, following an anti-BNP campaign launched by local religious groups and the Anti-Nazi League it lost this seat during the 1994 local elections. In the 1997 general election, it contested 55 seats and gained an average 1.4% of the vote.

John Tyndall was both [the BNPs] greatest asset and its greatest drawback. His persistence, rock-like reliability and leadership had kept the movement going, but with almost imperceptible growth since its 1982 foundation.

— Senior BNP member John Bean

In the early 1990s, the paramilitary group Combat 18 (C18)—its name a reference to Adolf Hitler—was formed to protect BNP events from anti-fascists. In 1992, C18 carried out attacks on left-wing targets like an anarchist bookshop and the headquarters of the Morning Star. Tyndall was angered by C18's growing influence on the BNP's street activities, and by August 1993, C18 activists were physically clashing with other BNP members. In December 1993, Tyndall issued a bulletin to BNP branches declaring C18 to be a proscribed organisation, furthermore suggesting that it may have been established by agents of the state to discredit the party. To counter the group's influence among militant British nationalists, he secured the American white nationalist militant William Pierce as a guest speaker at the BNP's annual rally in November 1995.

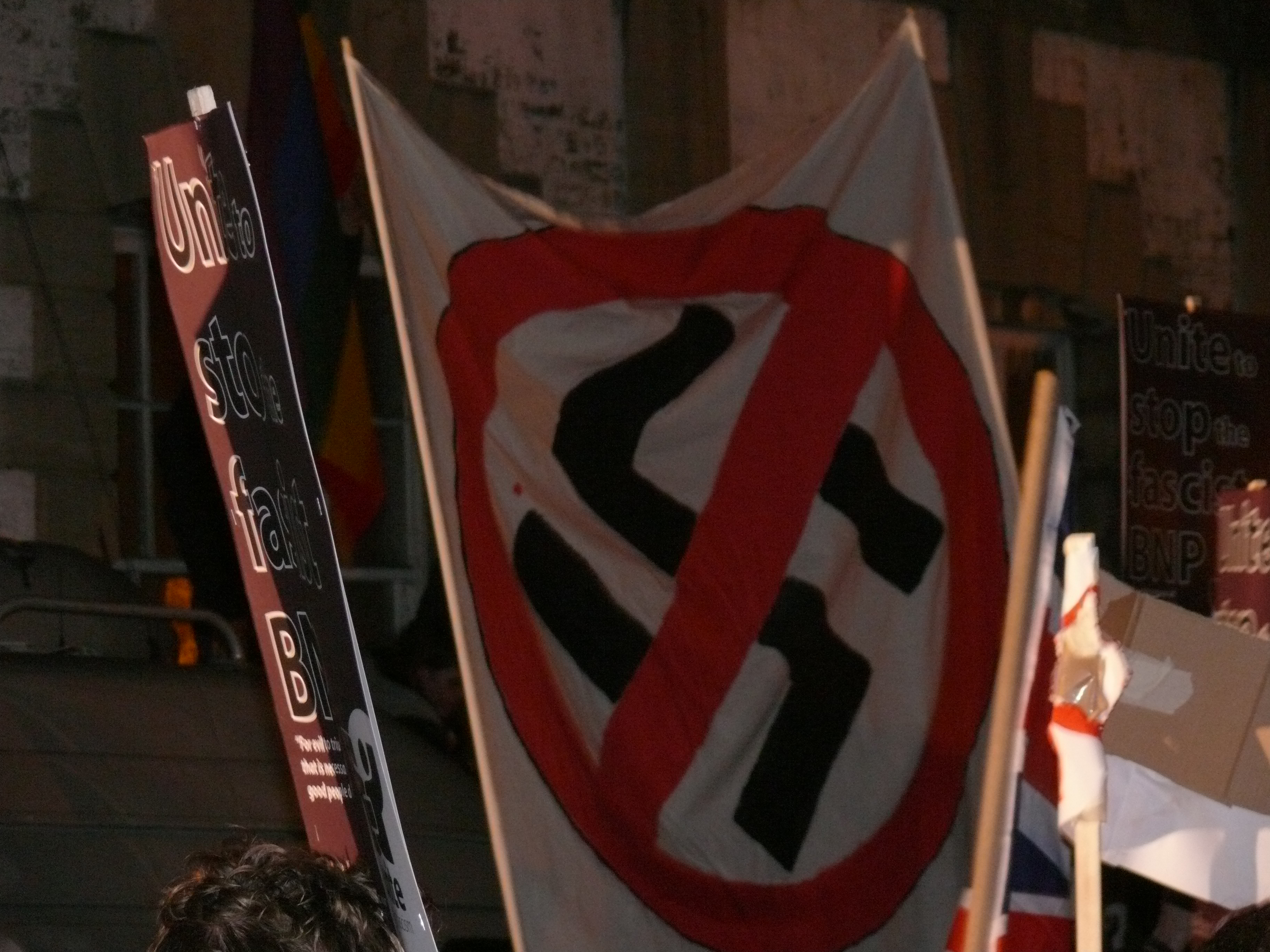
Anti-BNP placards and banners at a protest against the party in 2007

In the early 1990s, a group of "modernisers" emerged within the party who favoured a move towards a more electorally palatable strategy and an emphasis on building grassroots support to win local elections. They focused on community-based campaigning among the white working-class populations of London's East End, an area in which many of them lived. Utilising the slogan "Rights for Whites", this involved playing to anxieties regarding neighbouring immigrant and ethnic minority communities. They also called for similar tactics to be employed in those white working-class communities in Northern England which were adjacent to Pakistani and Bangladeshi communities, and for the party to promote rural issues to gain traction in the countryside.

The modernisers produced a magazine titled Patriot in which they stressed the importance of "suits, smiles and good presentation". They were impressed by the electoral gains made by a number of extreme-right parties in continental Europe—such as Jörg Haider's Freedom Party of Austria and Jean-Marie Le Pen's National Front—which had been achieved by both distancing themselves from anti-democratic ideas and towards populism and by switching focus from biological racism to the perceived cultural incompatibility of different racial groups. The modernisers succeeded in introducing some reforms: the BNP's newspaper for instance changed its slogan from "For Race and Nation" to "Voice of the British People". The party nevertheless did not lose its racial nationalist ideology and retained its links to violence-prone extra-parliamentary extreme-right groups such as Blood & Honour. Tyndall opposed many of the modernisers' ideas and sought to stem their growing influence in the party, declaring that "we should not be looking for ways of applying ideological cosmetic surgery to ourselves in order to make our features more appealing to the public".

In 1983, Tyndall sought to make an electoral impact by fielding 53 candidates in the 1983 general election, which guaranteed a free party broadcast. This broadcast featured Tyndall flanked by two British flags, and included footage of the Brixton riot, a violent clash between predominantly black local residents and the police. (Note: According to academic Martin Harrison in The British General Election of 1983, the BNP broadcast "was less heavily anti-black than the National Front's".) All of the BNP's candidates combined – including Tyndall and his wife Valerie – achieved only 14,621 votes and as a result they lost all of their deposits. It was revealed afterwards that the BNP Deputy Chairman Ray Hill had been working as a mole on behalf of the anti-fascist magazine Searchlight. During the mid-1980s, Tyndall's BNP absorbed numerous existing NF Flag Group (Note: There were overtures at a possible BNP and NF Flag Group reunification as the Nationalist Alliance. It was Andrew Brons of the NF Flag Group who attempted to engineer this. It came to nothing after Martin Wingfield, one of the NF Flag Group leaders, rejected the possibility in The Flag magazine. Wingfield had a long-standing grudge with BNP chairman Tyndall.) branches including Liverpool, Manchester, Leeds, and Glasgow. The party also began to develop friendly relations with the Federation of Conservative Students. The BNP also made contacts elsewhere on Europe, particularly with Flemish nationalists of the radical Odal Group, which succeeded the Order of Flemish Militants.

The BNP had been founded in opposition to the NF's perception as a group thoroughly infiltrated by homosexuals. Indeed, when Tyndall resigned from the NF in January 1980 he cited the Directorate's 'failure to remove the taint of homosexuality from the party's leadership [which] has caused widespread defections from the party' as a major motivating factor. Throughout the 1980s and 1990s, the BNP's publications frequently contained articles which suggested the presence of a national 'queer plot' to unsettle the heterosexual white nationalist cause, and the British nation more generally, not least via the HIV/AIDS virus. Indeed, the party produced stickers which read 'protect us from AIDS: outlaw homosexuality'.

Tyndall attempted to distance the party from neo-Nazism and the skinhead subculture, claiming that the party's more moderate image attracted 3,000 enquiries for membership after the 1983 general election. However, despite an increase in membership and media exposure, the BNP continued to poll very low in council elections, ranging from 1 - 3%, the sole exception being a council by-election in Sunderland in 1984, where the party polled 11.7%.

In 1986, Tyndall and John Morse were imprisoned for inciting racial hatred. While in prison, Tyndall wrote the part-autobiographical, part-political The Eleventh Hour, making Richard Edmonds the de facto leader of the BNP during this time. While Tyndall was imprisoned, the party ceased its electoral activity; only one candidate stood in the London Borough council elections. While Tyndall and Morse served short 4-month prison sentences, membership of the party had shrunk, and with little financial income, Tyndall decided not to stand candidates in the 1987 general election. However two party regional organisers, Alf Waite in Bromley and Michael Easter from the BNP's West Kent branch, defied his wishes and declared their intention to stand as BNP candidates. Both stood in the 1987 general election polling poorly. Both were subsequently expelled by Tyndall. The party was further damaged, by the fact a 1988 Sunday Times report revealed that BNP Deputy Chairman Richard Edmonds was once involved with a newspaper called the "Holocaust" News, published by the Centre for Historical Review. The publication claimed that the Holocaust, as presented in state-sponsored accounts, was an elaborate, politically motivated hoax. It promoted instead the Leuchter report, the Ball Report and the Rudolf Expertise. In 1989, the BNP had 800 members.

== Gains at local level (1990s) ==
The British National Party in the early 1990s picked up in its membership and support through the decline of the National Front, which had split into further factions. It had also mobilised 200 people for a "Rights for Whites" demonstration resulting in the 1989 Dewsbury riot. The BNP claimed the demonstration was in support of white parents who withdrew their children from predominantly Muslim schools. Writing about Dewsbury, Tyndall made the claim that "the name of our party, for long languishing in obscurity, is now on thousands of lips". Around this time, the party also saw a popularity growth in east London and relocated its bookshop to a heavily fortified headquarters at Welling. At the 1992 general election, Tyndall and Lady Birdwood were noted candidates who unsuccessfully stood for election. Following this, BNP candidate Derek Beackon—a last minute replacement for Eddy Butler—won the party its first local council seat in 1993 from Labour, during a local-by election for the Isle of Dogs, Tower Hamlets. The seat was fought on a "Rights for Whites" platform, in which it was alleged black families were being favoured in local housing initiatives. In May 1994, as local elections approached, the BNP hoped to hold its seat, but was defeated by Labour. However the BNP polled well elsewhere in London, particularly in the neighbouring borough of Newham where a BNP candidate came within 65 votes of being elected. Eddy Butler remarked on the results at the time: "Compared with results achieved by nationalist candidates in the recent past, our votes were nothing short of phenomenal.". John Tyndall also succeeded in retaining his deposit at a parliamentary by-election at Dagenham in June 1994, a first ever for the BNP.

In the aftermath of Beackon's electoral victory and losing his seat the following year, the British National Party clashed with paramilitary organisation, Combat 18, which had evolved in 1991 from a 'security force' made up of nationalists drawn from football casual firms was created to defend far-right activists, allegedly in response to a hammer attack at Kensington Central Library. The force firebombed the headquarters of the communist newspaper, the Morning Star, and by 1993 had transformed into the neo-Nazi paramilitary organisation Combat 18. That same year, the BNP proscribed membership of the group and claimed it had been infiltrated by MI5. In September 1995, Tyndall maintained that in response to the BNP's victory in Millwall, C18 had been 'created' by the State security services in order to wreck the BNP and its electoral support. Nick Griffin, who later became British National Party chairman, stated in Spearhead during 1999 that members of Combat 18 had been a faction of the British Movement some years earlier, from which they were expelled, but never part of the BNP. He claimed that it had "been known for some years that MI5 encouraged or even ordered the setting up of C18 in order to disrupt and discredit the BNP after historic electoral success in Millwall in 1993", and also that The Observer had confirmed that Combat 18 was a state-sponsored "honeytrap" right from the start. It was revealed around this time that another Searchlight mole, Tim Hepple, had infiltrated the BNP, proving controversial in far-left circles, since he was the primary organiser of the Dewsbury incident in 1989. However, Hepple also worked as a Searchlight mole amongst the radical left as an "agent provocateur". According to author Larry O'Hara, Hepple attempted to get Green Anarchist to publish works by radical nationalists, with the intention of publishing an exposé in Searchlight that they were "working with fascists"—thus leaving them open to attack from all sides. This happened to Class War. Political opponents claimed that "racist incidents" occurred around the BNP's headquarters and instigated a "close down the BNP" march in October 1993. (Note: The march was organised by the Anti-Nazi League. Thousands of people attended the demonstration, for which 2,600 police officers were deployed. A hardcore element associated with the SWP and Militant refused to accept police instruction to divert the march away from the BNP's headquarters itself, once it had gone past it. In a resulting riot, 21 police officers and 41 demonstrators were injured, leading to a frontpage headline "Masked mob stone police" in The Mail on Sunday.) In 1995, Bexley Council shut down the BNP headquarters. The same year, relations were built up with William Luther Pierce's US-based National Alliance.

In August 1995, Tyndall committed the party to contesting 50 seats at the next general election. However the party was in a poor state, as the membership had dropped to 700 and there was an ongoing conflict with Combat 18. The party attempted to further modernise its image for the upcoming 1997 general election as Michael Newland, the party's press officer looked towards the example of the Austrian Freedom Party as a model for a 'new', modern and respectable British nationalism. Newland however briefly resigned from the party in early 1996 convinced that it needed a new leader. Nick Griffin joined the party in 1995, having led a faction of the National Front and Tyndall employed him to edit Spearhead. Griffin believed the British National Party needed to be further modernised, with no fascist connections, but through a forthright commitment to what he regarded as historical revisionism. A booklet, Who are the Mind-benders? co-written by Griffin was unveiled by the BNP in early 1997, arguing that Britain and its media was mass-controlled by a "liberal-elite". Furthermore, Griffin flirted with Holocaust denial writing in The Rune that the Holocaust was a "mixture of Allied wartime propaganda, extremely profitable lie, and latter-day witch-hysteria". He was consequently prosecuted under the Public Order Act at the instigation of Alex Carlile MP. These claims some British National Party members believed were losing the appeal and ideology of the party, Newland considered them to be the views of "Nazi cranks". However, according to Tyndall in his "July Members' Bulletin", the BNP's support was increasing with between 2,500 and 3,000 membership enquiries just prior to the 1997 general election. The party managed to save two deposits in this election, Tyndall with 7.26 per cent and Dave King with 7.5 per cent, in the East End of London and Canning Town. However it has been alleged that Dave King benefited from voter confusion since he shared the same surname as Oona King, the winning Labour candidate.

A party banner associated with the BNP since the 1990s

Following the 1997 general election, the BNP once again suffered a setback. At local elections in May 1998, the BNP fielded five more candidates than in 1994 but its average vote fell from just over 13% to a derisory 3.28%. In Tower Hamlets, its average share of the poll slumped by almost half. At the end of 1998, membership stood at 1,100. Having gone from the verge of a major electoral breakthrough to the point of stagnation, the party held its first leadership election.

== Griffin leadership, identity nationalism, growth years (1999–2007) ==
In September 1999, Nick Griffin, supported by Tony Lecomber, stood against Tyndall for leadership of the BNP. John Tyndall only received 411 (30%) of the votes, giving Griffin the majority with 70%. After Griffin won he began modernising the party's image, though the crucial policy change from compulsory to voluntary repatriation which had already been suggested under Tyndall's leadership. Griffin moved the party from a focus on the status of Jews in Britain, to allowing Jews to stand for the party. A new monthly newspaper, The Voice of Freedom, was initiated, as well as a journal, Identity. During the 2001 general election, following the milltown riots, Oldham and Burnley polled highest for the BNP. Following 9/11 the BNP made further political capital.

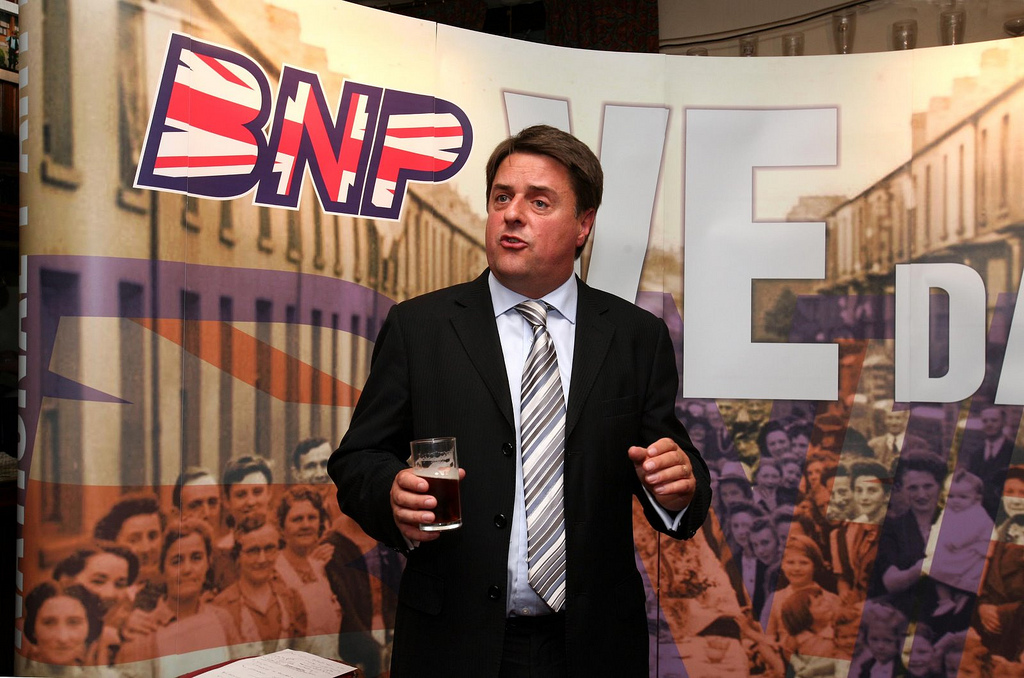
Nick Griffin MEP, chairman of the BNP

At local level, the BNP continued to improve on its electoral results in 2002–03, gaining council seats in Blackburn, Calderdale and Burnley, despite an extensive opposition campaign. This success led to a large number of the National Democrats party, including Simon Darby and Martin Wingfield defecting to the British National Party from 1999 to 2003. Following the 2004 elections, the BBC and Searchlight created a documentary called The Secret Agent, featuring Jason Gwynne infiltrating the BNP. In it, Griffin and Mark Collett made comments critical of Islam. Following the documentary, Barclays Bank froze the party's accounts. Collett and Griffin were acquitted on charges of incitement to racial hatred in 2006. The BNP branded the BBC "cockroaches". In Burnley, the BNP lost one of its councillors, Maureen Stowe, who left the party after claiming it was racist. She told The Guardian, "I became a BNP councillor, like most people who voted for me, by believing their lies". Following the 7/7 bombings in London, the BNP released fliers with the slogan; "maybe now it's time to start listening to the BNP". Griffin claimed that this was the "cost of voting Labour", attacking the government for bringing the United Kingdom into an "illegal" Iraq War and for its immigration policies. YouGov claimed in 2006, that support for the party stood at up to 7%. Large gains were made in the 2006 local elections, where the BNP more than doubled its number of councillors and became the second party on the Barking and Dagenham council.

In December 2006, it was revealed that a Guardian journalist, Ian Cobain, had worked undercover in the BNP for seven months, becoming the party's central London organiser. Among the accusations made by the paper was that the BNP used "techniques of secrecy and deception ... in its attempt to conceal its activities and intentions from the public". It asserted that the BNP operated with a "network of false identities" and organised rendezvous points to allow members to be directed to "clandestine meetings". Party members were directed to avoid "any racist or anti-semitic language in public". Cobain also claimed that the membership in central London had expanded beyond the party's traditional range, now including "dozens of company directors, computing entrepreneurs, bankers and estate agents, and a handful of teachers". Following the report, the campaign group Unite Against Fascism called for ballerina Simone Clarke to be dismissed from the English National Ballet, because her views on immigration were "incompatible with a leading arts institution such as the English National Ballet" and because she had "used her position to support a party which fosters division". Clarke said: "the BNP is the only party to take a stand against immigration". The BNP was investigated by the Electoral Commission in 2007, after The Guardian revealed that it had set up a front organisation to raise money from sympathisers in the United States. Later in 2007, three BNP councillors resigned. In Epping, Terry Farr resigned after suspension for writing abusive letters to Trevor Phillips. In Sandwell, James Lloyd was disqualified for not attending any meetings. In Blackburn, Robin Evans left the party and wrote a letter to his former colleagues denouncing it as a party of drug-dealers and football hooligans. Evans remains a councillor, describing himself as a "national socialist".

In late 2007, several BNP officials, including councillor Sadie Graham and head of administration Kenny Smith, had pressed for the expulsion of three senior officials—treasurer John Walker, his deputy Dave Hannam and director of publicity Mark Collett—who they accused of bringing the BNP into disrepute. The BNP later accused Graham and Smith of being "far left" infiltrators. In December Graham and Smith launched a blog detailing their complaints against the trio. They were dismissed from their positions by Nick Griffin. During the ensuing dispute, members of BNP security seized a computer from Graham's home. Griffin claimed that they were recovering party property, while Graham claimed that it was her own. A number of BNP councillors later resigned the whip after Councillor Nina Brown claimed that BNP Security had misled her into giving them the key to Sadie Graham's home.

A number of BNP officials resigned in support of Smith and Graham, or were expelled. These included the head of the Young BNP. The BNP leadership said that the significance of the dispute was exaggerated and that it would quickly blow over. In late December 2007, the dissidents began to refer to themselves as the "Real BNP". They said that they would stay within the BNP and campaign for a change of leaders. In January 2008, the group launched a new website called "Voice of Change", "an umbrella group to assist candidates who wish to stand as independent nationalists in the local elections in May 2008, and in any local by-elections throughout the year". They aimed to challenge Nick Griffin's leadership, calling him "tyrannical", "arrogant" and surrounded by "yes men".

The constitution of the BNP has been criticised by members for giving far too much power to the chairman and for not being easily accessible by the membership. In 2007, a leadership challenge by a Tyndallite faction led by Christian (Chris) Jackson succeeded in forcing an election, which was however lost. The following year saw the resignation or expulsion of scores of activists from a different wing of the party and an unsuccessful bid for the leadership by Councillor Colin Auty.

In the 2008 London mayoral election, after years of growing support (33,569 (2.0%) in 2000 and 58,407 (3.1%) in 2004), the BNP received 69,710 (3.2%) of the vote and was fifth in the London mayoral election. It also finished fifth with 130,714 votes (5.3%) in that year's London Assembly election ( compared with 47,670 (2.8%) in 2000 and 90,365 (4.71) in 2004); its candidate Richard Barnbrook won a seat in the London Assembly.

== Major electoral breakthrough, European Parliament (2007–2010) ==
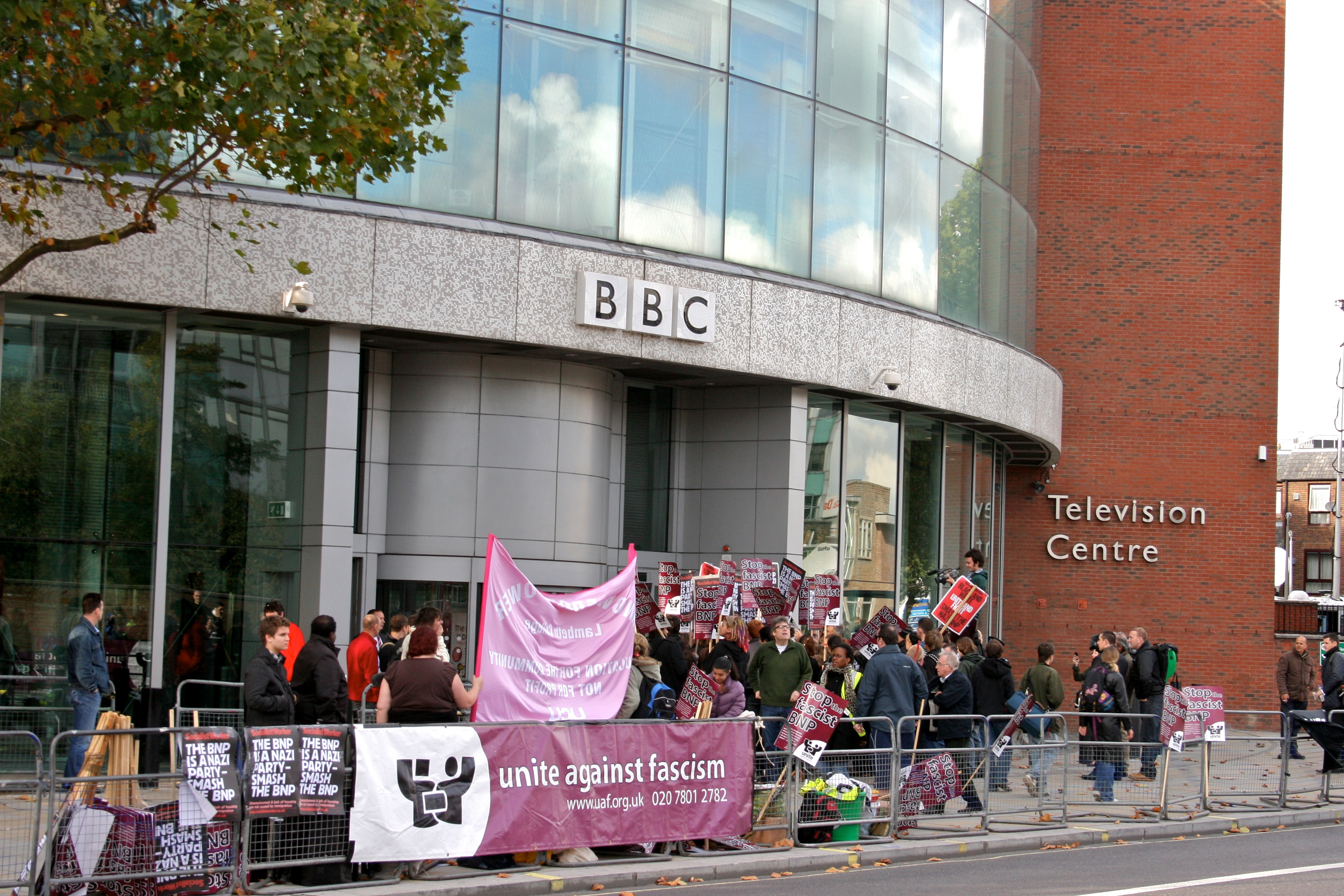
Protesters outside the BBC Television Centre in October 2009, before Nick Griffin's controversial appearance on Question Time

In the 2009 European elections the British National Party won two seats in the European Parliament. Andrew Brons was elected in the Yorkshire and the Humber regional constituency with 9.8% of the vote. Party chairman Nick Griffin was elected in the North West region, with 8% of the vote. Nationally, the BNP received 6.26%. Griffin stated that it was "a great victory ... we go on from here." Meanwhile, the Labour and Conservative parties both referred to it as a "sad moment". The Archbishops of Canterbury and York said it would be tragic if people abstained or voted BNP at the local and European elections. In local elections held the same day, the BNP also won its first three county council seats in Lancashire, Leicestershire and Hertfordshire. The breakthrough of the British National Party in the 2009 European elections was widely reported throughout Britain by the media. Matt Goodwin in his article "The BNP's breakthrough", notes that the British National Party was able to capitalise on widespread public anxiety over immigration. Also in light of the United Kingdom parliamentary expenses scandal, there was media speculation that the BNP could do well in the polls, as voters sought an alternative party to register their protest. Nick Griffin claimed that the success of the British National Party was down to its modernisation, having kept things "simple" and ditched the fringe in the movement who were concerned with "... genetics, Zionism and historical revisionism". He also claimed the party's success was down to the fact the mainstream parties in Britain never discussed immigration, while the British National Party openly did and were not scared to do so:

"The Labour Party, the Lib Dems and the Tories, by leaving the door to Britain open, has forced people to turn to a party which speaks openly about the problem of immigration."

At the end of 2009, the party's membership was 12,632, its highest. It also had set up BNPtv, its own online video outlet, a student wing (Student BNP) and the Young BNP (British Nationalist Youth Movement). The party's financial resources had also increased from £726,455 (in 2006) to £1,983,947.

In 2009, Nick Griffin appeared on the BBC's Question Time, amid significant public controversy.

== Electoral peak and subsequent decline (2010–) ==
British National Party (BNP) vote share in the 2010 UK general election.

The British National Party in the 2010 general election fielded a record 338 candidates, polling 563,743 votes, but won no seats. Nick Griffin came third in the Barking constituency, where the party the same year in the local elections lost all of the 12 councillors it held on the borough. In total, 26 BNP councillors lost their seats, leaving the party with 28 seats overall. In aftermath of the elections, the party further suffered from infighting over concerns over the finances and leadership of the party.

In aftermath of the elections, the party suffered from infighting over concerns regarding finances and Griffin's leadership. A day prior to the general election, the BNP official website was also closed and replaced with a posting from its Simon Bennett, the party's website manager, accusing Griffin and James Dowson, the BNP election fundraiser, of being "pathetic, desperate and incompetent". Membership of the party also declined after the general election, leading to breakaway groups Britain First (2011–present), Britannica Party (August 2011–present), the British Democrats (9 February 2013–present), Liberty GB (5 March 2013–present) and the British Freedom Party. However, the BFP later de-registered as a political party in December 2012.

Following disappointing election results in 2011, and a General Members Meeting which did away with the virtually insurmountable nominations' requirement for a leadership election, a leadership election took place in 2011. Griffin secured a narrow victory, beating fellow MEP Brons by nine votes of a total of 2,316 votes cast.

In October 2012, Brons left the party, leaving Griffin as its sole MEP. In the 2012 and 2013 local elections, the BNP won no council seats and witnessed a large drop in terms of their average vote.

In June 2013, Griffin visited Syria on a "peace mission" along with members of Jobbik to meet with the Speaker of the Syrian People's Assembly, Mohammad Jihad al-Laham, the Prime Minister Wael Nader al-Halqi, among other government officials. Griffin claims he was influential in the speaker of Syria's Parliament writing an open letter to British MPs urging them to "turn Great Britain from the warpath" by not intervening in the Syrian conflict.

Nick Griffin also announced that he would step down as leader in 2013. Three senior BNP members subsequently challenged Griffin for the leadership of the party. Having failed to secure enough support to trigger a leadership ballot, both Eddy Butler and Richard Barnbrook were expelled from the party some months later.

Nick Griffin lost his European Parliament seat in the May 2014 European election. Two months later, in July, Griffin lost a leadership contest and was succeeded by Adam Walker as acting chairman who had been banned from the profession for life after allegedly verbally abusing his students. In October, Griffin was expelled for the party owing to disparaging remarks he made to a fellow member, and for allegedly "trying to cause disunity".

In January 2015, a Hope not Hate report estimated that membership of the party numbered 500, from 4220 in December 2013. At the general election in 2015, the BNP fielded eight candidates, down from 338 in 2010. The party's vote share declined 99.7% from its 2010 result.

A Hope not Hate report in 2015 argued that the decline of the BNP, EDL, and others was caused due to schisms within the party, combined with a rise in the right-wing populist UKIP. This sentiment was echoed by UKIP National Executive Committee member and former Conservative MP Neil Hamilton, who also said in 2014 that UKIP attracted "decent" BNP voters, And in the same year UKIP leader Nigel Farage expressed his pride in allegedly gaining one third of BNP voter support.

In January 2016, the Electoral Commission deregistered the British National Party as a legal political party, after it had failed to complete its annual registration, meaning that its candidates could not have been identified on ballot papers as being endorsed by the BNP. A month later, the party was re-registered.

Adam Walker sought re-election in the 2019 British National Party leadership election in June 2019, since the party constitution required a leadership election to occur at least once every four years. His only opponent was the BNP press officer and national spokesman David Furness. The results were announced by the returning officer, David O'Loughlin, on 29 July 2019 at an unnamed venue in north west London. Walker won 308 votes (64.71%) to Furness' 161 (33.82%) and was re-elected BNP leader. There were 7 spoiled ballot papers (1.47%). Furness' name has since been removed across the BNP website, and he later joined the British Democratic Party.

During Walker's second term as chairman (2019–2023), the BNP has experienced a collapse in its membership, as a large number of nationalist activists once affiliated with the party have begun coalescing around the British Democrats. The BNP has also been essentially inactive since 2019, and have not put forward a single candidate in any elections since 2019, with the only evidence of any activity whatsoever being the occasional post on its website or Twitter account. The primary source of the party's income has come in the form of money from wills left by ex-supporters. Although the party constitution required for a leadership election to occur in July 2023, no candidates appeared to have stood forward, or at least none reached the eight endorsements required from voting members in order to launch a candidacy, so Walker was presumably re-elected by default.
