= Andrew Fountaine =

British political activist (1918–1997)

- Fountaine at a training camp in 1960
- Born: Andrew Douglas Algernon Maclean Fountaine; 7 December 1918; Norfolk, England
- Died: 14 September 1997 (aged 78); King's Lynn, Norfolk, England
- Education: Army College, Aldershot
- Years active: 1935–1981
- Known for: Far-right politician
- Notable work: Meaning of an Enemy (1960–65)
- Political party: Conservative Party; National Labour Party; British National Party; National Front; Constitutional Movement
- Parent(s): Charles Fountaine (father), Louisa Constance Catherine Fountaine (mother)
- Relatives: Tony Martin (nephew)
- Military career
- Allegiance: United Kingdom
- Branch: Royal Navy
- Rank: Sub-lieutenant
- Conflict: Spanish Civil War; Second World War

Andrew Douglas Algernon Maclean Fountaine (7 December 1918 – 14 September 1997) was a British far right activist. After military service in a number of conflicts, Fountaine joined the Conservative Party and was selected as a parliamentary candidate until his outspoken views resulted in his being disowned by the party.

Fountaine was subsequently involved with a number of fringe rightist movements before becoming a founding member of the National Front in 1967. He had several roles within the party and was involved in a number of internal feuds until he left in 1979. He briefly led his own splinter party before retiring from politics.

== Early years ==
Born into a land-owning Norfolk family who had resided in ancestral Narford Hall, The son of Vice Admiral Charles Fountaine, who had been Naval ADC to King George V, Fountaine was educated at the Army College in Aldershot. One of his ancestors was an art collector. Fountaine drove an ambulance for the Abyssinians during the Second Italo-Abyssinian War. He also attended Cambridge University studying natural sciences. He then fought for Francisco Franco's forces during the Spanish Civil War, before enlisting in the Royal Navy as an ordinary seaman during the Second World War. During the war he was appointed a temporary sub-lieutenant. He served in the Pacific as gunnery officer on the aircraft carrier HMS Indefatigable, attaining the rank of lieutenant-commander, before being invalided out after a kamikaze attack in April 1945.

== Conservative Party ==
During the 1940s, Fountaine became involved with the Conservative Party, with his speeches becoming one of the highlights of the annual party conference, such as during the 1948 conference when he denounced the Labour Party as consisting of "semi-alien mongrels and hermaphrodite communists". In 1949, he was chosen by the Tories as their candidate for Chorley in Lancashire at the next general election. A speech to the Tory Party conference that same year was considered to be antisemitic. As a result, the party chairman, Lord Woolton, disavowed his nomination. Nonetheless, no official Conservative candidate was nominated to take his place, and, as a result, Fountaine finished only 361 votes behind the winning candidate, the Labour incumbent Clifford Kenyon.

== John Bean ==
Having left the Conservative Party, Fountaine launched his own group, known as the National Front Movement. This came to nothing, and so he became a member of the League of Empire Loyalists. He followed John Bean out of this group and was a founder member of the National Labour Party. Officially the leader of the NLP, Fountaine fulfilled this role because, being a landowner in Norfolk, he presented a more respectable image than Bean, although actual control lay with Bean. Fountaine remained a strong supporter of Bean and supported him in his later struggles with Colin Jordan in the earlier British National Party (BNP) in the 1960s, with Fountaine acting as party president. It was during this time that Fountaine's land was used for 'Spearhead' drilling exercises under the supervision of Jordan and John Tyndall.

Fountaine later claimed that during this time he regularly telephoned the home number of Harold Macmillan in order to tell the prime minister to do more to stop immigration, although he also added that Macmillan would hang up as soon as he heard Fountaine's voice.

== National Front ==
Along with the rest of the BNP, Fountaine became a founder member of the National Front (NF), although problems developed from the outset owing to his fractious relationship with A. K. Chesterton. Nonetheless, he was the party's first parliamentary election candidate in Acton in a by-election in 1968, where he gained 1400 votes (over 5% of the total) and came fourth.

Alarmed by the protests of 1968, Fountaine believed that revolution was sure to follow in continental Europe and, fearing similar protests in the UK, told NF members to report to the police in order to offer their services in the event of revolution or civil war. Chesterton, who had no desire to hand details of the nascent movement to the police, promptly expelled Fountaine although the latter obtained a court order overturning the expulsion and at the 1968 party conference challenged Chesterton for the leadership. In the interim, Fountaine's credibility had been attacked by John Tyndall in the pages of Spearhead magazine and with his reputation damaged he was easily routed by Chesterton's 316 votes to 20. After a confrontation with Chesterton in which he told Fountaine to submit to his leadership or leave, Fountaine walked out with two of his closest supporters, Gerald Kemp and Rodney Legg, who joined him in resigning from the National Directorate of the NF.

Fountaine largely disappeared from view for some years after this, although during the internal struggles of 1974, which saw Tyndall as leader pitted against a newly emerged group of populists, pro-Tyndall elements claimed that Fountaine had secretly been conspiring with Roy Painter, at the time recognised as the leader of the populist faction. Despite this, Tyndall subsequently courted the support of Fountaine following the election of John Kingsley Read, who had emerged ahead of Painter as populist leader, as NF Chairman. Fountaine agreed to work with Tyndall, and at the 1975 conference proposed one of Tyndall's favoured ideas, changing leadership elections from the existing system of National Directorate members only to a party-wide vote, a motion that was narrowly defeated. In November 1975, Tyndall was expelled from the party while Fountaine and Martin Webster were suspended for their part in recent machinations, although all three were reinstated by court order the following month. Kingsley Read and his supporters broke away to form the National Party soon afterwards.

Fountaine returned to public notice under Tyndall and was adopted as the party's candidate for the 1976 Coventry North West by-election. His campaign secured only 3% of the vote in a city where the local branch had been divided by the National Party split, although Fountaine did at least beat Kingsley Read.

Fountaine's alliance with Tyndall did not last, however, and he became openly critical of what he saw as the neo-Nazism of Tyndall and Webster, as well as their attempts to recruit elements he saw as undesirable, such as racist skinheads and football hooligans. As a result, by 1978 Fountaine had become a focus for dissident activity within the NF. In the 1979 election, Fountaine stood as National Front candidate in the Norwich South constituency, polling 264 votes (0.7%).

== Later years ==
Following the NF's failure at the 1979 general election, Fountaine split with Tyndall in 1979, and challenged him for the leadership, but was defeated and split from the NF to form his own NF Constitutional Movement, later called the Nationalist Party. The new party claimed 2,000 members by January 1980 and published a newspaper, Excalibur. The new movement was short-lived as Fountaine became disillusioned with the far right's in-fighting. He retired from politics in 1981 to concentrate on growing trees on his estate Narford Hall, northwest of Swaffham, and remained there until his death in 1997.

Fountaine's book Meaning of an Enemy was serialised in John Bean's magazine Combat from 1960 to 1965. It was published by Ostara Publications in November 2012 ISBN 978-1-291-19752-5.

== Personal life and death ==
Fountaine had a son and a daughter from his first marriage, which lasted from 1949 to 1960, and another son from his second marriage, which lasted from September 1960 to his death.

Tony Martin (1944–2025), a Norfolk farmer who received extensive media coverage after shooting and killing a burglar at his Norfolk home, Bleak House near Wisbech in 1999, was a nephew by marriage of Fountaine.

Andrew Fountaine died in King's Lynn, Norfolk on 14 September 1997, at the age of 78.

== Elections contested ==
Date of election	Constituency	Party	Votes	%
1950	Chorley	Conservative	22872	46.9
25 March 1959	South West Norfolk	Independent	785	2.6
28 March 1968	Acton	NF	1400	5.6
4 March 1976	Coventry NW	NF	986	3.1
1979	Norwich South	NF	264	0.7

Note: Although Fountaine was the candidate of the local Conservative Party in 1950 his candidacy had been disavowed by the party at national level.
