= Andrew Brons =

British politician and former MEP (born 1947)

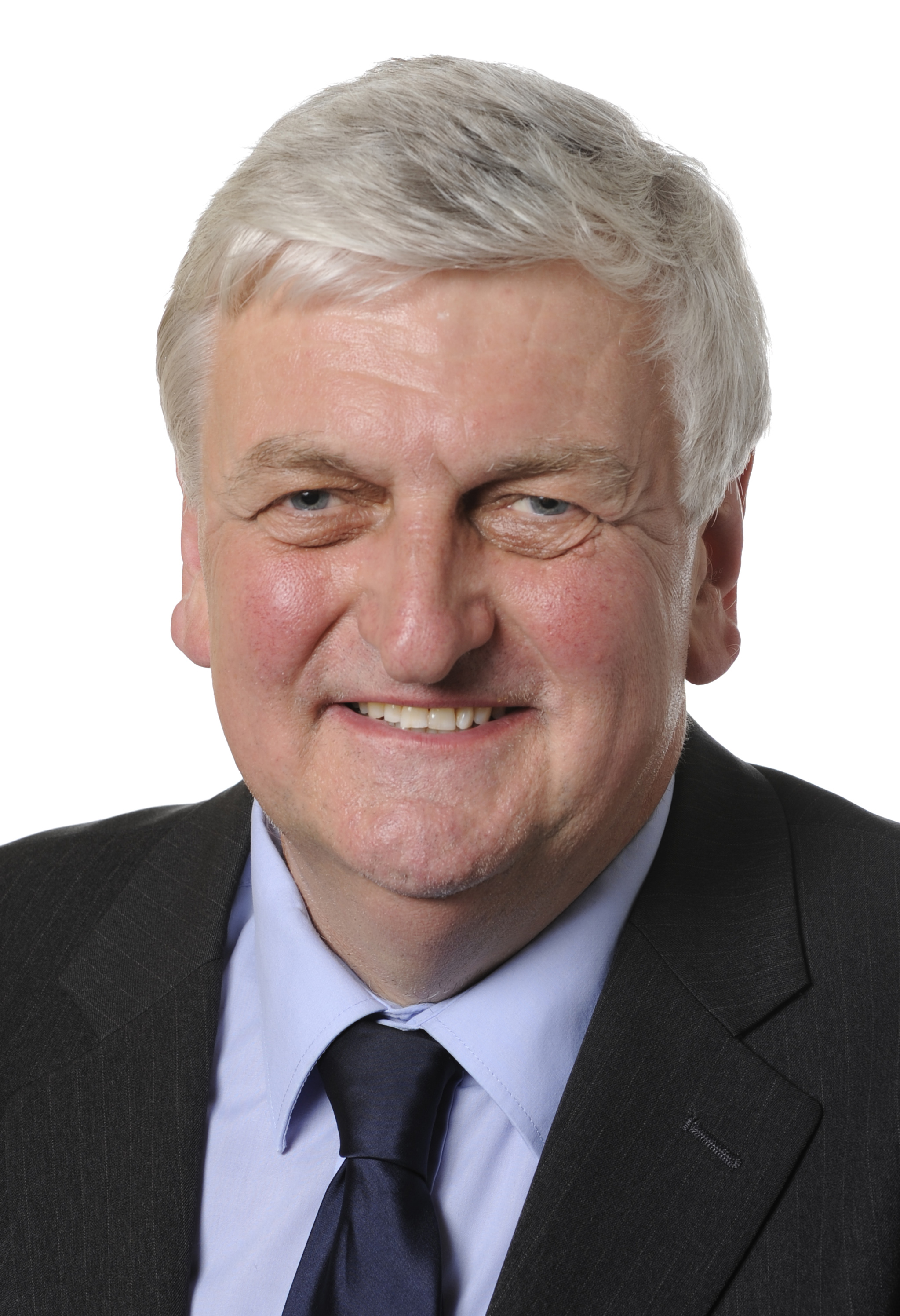

President of the British Democratic Party
- Incumbent
- Assumed office 9 February 2013
- Leader: James Lewthwaite
- Preceded by: Position Established

Member of the European Parliament for Yorkshire and the Humber
- In office 14 July 2009 – 26 May 2014
- Preceded by: Richard Corbett
- Succeeded by: Richard Corbett

Chairman of the National Front
- In office 1980–1984
- Deputy: Richard Verrall
- Preceded by: John Tyndall
- Succeeded by: Martin Wingfield

Personal details
- Born: Andrew Henry William Brons; 3 June 1947 (age 79) Hackney, London, England
- Party: British Democratic Party (since 2013)
- Other political affiliations: BNP (2005–2012), National Front (1967–1999), BNP (1960) (1965–67), NSM (1964–65),
- Children: 2 daughters
- Education: University of York
- Occupation: Retired college lecturer, Harrogate College of Further Education
- Website: www.andrewbronsmep.eu/

Andrew Henry William Brons (born 3 June 1947) is a British politician and former MEP. Long active in far-right politics in Britain, he was elected as a Member of the European Parliament (MEP) for Yorkshire and the Humber for the fascist British National Party (BNP) at the 2009 European Parliament election and held the seat until May 2014. He was the chairman of the National Front in the early 1980s. He resigned the BNP whip in October 2012 and became patron of the far-right British Democratic Party. He did not seek re-election in 2014.

== Family background and early life ==
Brons, who has English and German ancestry, was born in Hackney, East London, two years after the end of the Second World War. He spent most of his childhood in Sidcup, on the outskirts of London, before his family moved to Harrogate when he was eleven years old. He attended Harrogate Grammar School until the age of sixteen, when he left to join the civil service, where he remained for 16 months before sitting part-time A-levels in law and economics at Harrogate College. He studied politics at the University of York, and graduated in 1970.

After graduation, Brons started working as a lecturer at Harrogate College in 1970, and worked there until 2005; lecturing in A-level law and government, and politics. He has two daughters.

== Political career ==
=== Early activity ===
Brons began his involvement in politics in 1964 when, aged seventeen, he joined the National Socialist Movement (NSM), a Neo-Nazi organisation founded on Adolf Hitler's birthday by Colin Jordan. In 1980, Searchlight published two letters Brons had written in 1965 to Françoise Dior, Jordan's wife, in which he mentioned meeting an NSM member who "mentioned such activities as bombing synagogues", stating in response to this that: "On this subject I have a dual view, in that I realise that he is well intentioned, I feel that our public image may suffer considerable damage as a result of these activities. I am however open to correction on this point." The second letter requested materials such as a swastika, a copy of the Horst-Wessel-Lied, and posters and stickers in furtherance of Brons' goal of forming a local NSM group.

Questioned in 2009 about his membership of the National Socialist Movement, Brons said, "People do silly things when they are seventeen. Peter Mandelson was once a member of the Young Communist League but we don't continue to call him a Communist." Brons was forced to return to the issue in March 2011 when – on the BBC's Daily Politics programme – Dominic Carman, the Liberal Democrat candidate for the 2011 Barnsley Central by-election, called Brons, in his absence, a "Nazi and an admirer of Adolf Hitler". In response Brons released a statement on his website, stating:

"It is on record that I was a member of the National Socialist Movement between the ages of seventeen and eighteen. I am now sixty-three, nearly sixty four – forty six years ago, nearly half a century! From the age of eighteen, I have been a committed supporter of Parliamentary democracy and the rule of law. The parties of which I have been a member, since then, have all been committed to democracy. Many Labour politicians have been members of the Communist Party in their teens, twenties and even thirties. Denis Healey was a member of the Communist Party at the height of the Stalinist purges. Would anybody be allowed to call Mr. Healey an avowed Communist and admirer of Joseph Stalin?"

=== National Front ===
In 1965, Brons joined John Bean's British National Party (not the same as the current incarnation), which later merged with the League of Empire Loyalists to form the National Front (NF) in 1967. Brons was voted onto the National Front's national directorate in 1974, and as the NF's education officer, he hosted seminars on racial nationalism, attempting give the movement's racism a more "scientific" basis.

Brons contested Harrogate for the National Front in both February and October 1974 general elections, polling 1,186 votes (2.3%) in February and 1,030 (2.3%) in October. When Labour's Roy Jenkins resigned his parliamentary seat on appointment as European Commission President in early 1977, Brons contested the Birmingham Stechford by-election for the National Front. He polled 2,955 votes (8.2%), forcing the Liberal candidate into fourth place.

==== Leadership ====
Following the poor showing by the National Front at the 1979 general election, and John Tyndall's subsequent departure, Brons became Chairman of the NF in 1980 and in doing so broke with his former mentor. Brons, though, led the NF in name only. Initially, National Activities Organiser Martin Webster exerted the most influence, before the Political Soldier wing of the party became more important. Brons tended to support the Flag Group although he lost influence to Ian Anderson and faded from his leading position. Nevertheless, Brons had links to the Political Soldier wing and is credited with having introduced the concept of distributism into the party, which formed a central part of the new ideology of the NF. Brons co-edited the NF journal New Nation, with Richard Verrall, the author of a work of holocaust denial, Did Six Million Really Die?

Brons edited the National Front's 1983 general election manifesto, which "called for a global apartheid to prevent the 'extinction' of whites everywhere." The manifesto declared that "The National Front rejects the whole concept of multiracialism. We recognise inherent racial differences in Man. The races of Man are profoundly unequal in their characteristics, potential and abilities."

On at least two occasions in the early-1980s, Brons' far-right activities caused difficulties for his employer: on 24 June 1981, more than 500 student and Anti-Nazi League campaigners marched through Harrogate, taking over the college building where Brons was teaching; six protesters were arrested. In February 1982, more than 300 protesters clashed with 100 National Front supporters outside Brons' classroom in central Harrogate, and in the process two students were stabbed and six people arrested.

In October 1983, Brons called upon the principal of Harrogate College as a character witness, when Brons was convicted by magistrates of using insulting words and behaviour likely to cause a breach of the peace and fined £50. Brons had been leading a group leafleting in Leeds city centre. A shop assistant reported that the group had been shouting "National Front" and making clenched fist salutes, while an unnamed policeman is supposed to have heard "white power" and "death to Jews". When a police officer of Malaysian origin asked the group to disperse, the policeman said that Brons replied: "I am aware of my legal rights. Inferior beings like you probably do not appreciate the principle of free speech," - an allegation which Brons has always denied. His appeal to Leeds Crown Court was unsuccessful.

Although Brons continued as a leading member and even wrote a number of articles for the Political Soldier-supporting Nationalism Today, he was generally opposed to the positions of the 'Official' National Front and resigned from the chairmanship in November 1984. He left the official party altogether in 1986 but, unlike Webster who had been expelled in 1984, Brons became involved with the Flag Group, an NF Fronde. It was Brons who, in 1987, approached Tyndall with a view to an electoral alliance between the Flag Group and the modern British National Party but the proposed deal fell through and was repudiated by Martin Wingfield in The Flag newspaper.

=== British National Party ===
After leaving the 'official' National Front, in 1986, Brons chiefly dedicated himself to the duties of his lectureship at Harrogate College until his retirement in 2005. However, he maintained his membership of the National Front (as the Flag Group became known on the dissolution of the 'official' party in 1989) until 1999. Upon his retirement, Brons joined the BNP in 2005. He subsequently wrote at least two articles for the BNP's official magazine Identity.

Brons had a "tentative agreement" to return to work at Harrogate College in September 2009. He had however been selected as BNP lead candidate for the European Elections 2009 in the Yorkshire and the Humber constituency, and upon becoming the BNP's first Member of the European Parliament he declined the college's offer.

Brons stood as a parliamentary candidate for the Keighley constituency at the 2010 general election. He came fourth in the election with 1,962 votes.

In August 2010, Brons and fellow members of the BNP Policy Committee were asked by the chairman and advisory council to carry out a consultation of members about possible changes to the party's constitution, with particular reference to two areas, governance of the party nationally and the rules for internal elections. On 8 November, his findings were published online.

At the end of May 2011, Brons announced that he would seek nomination for the leadership of the British National Party in an internal election which would have been held in the autumn. Following constitutional changes rushed through by Nick Griffin, the leadership election was brought forward to the summer. Brons was narrowly defeated, receiving 1,148 votes to Griffin's 1,157.

On 16 October 2012, Brons resigned the BNP whip following disputes with the party leader Griffin, stating that Griffin had described him "in a text to his attack dogs as 'vermin'". He continued as an MEP until 2014 when he did not stand for re-election.

=== Member of the European Parliament ===
Upon election to the European Parliament, Brons and his fellow BNP MEP Nick Griffin were heavily critical of any legislation, current or pending, which they saw as designed to reduce the national sovereignty and independence of member states or to have a negative impact on Britain. He was a member of the Constitutional Affairs Committee and a substitute for the Civil Liberties, Justice and Home Affairs Committee.

==== Committee on Croatia ====
On entering the European Parliament Brons was designated to the Delegation to the EU-Croatia Joint Parliamentary Committee this being a joint delegation to create dialogue with the Croatian Parliament at the time Croatia was a candidate country. On 29-30 March 2010, the delegation including Brons met in Zagreb, and Brons spoke in the Croatian Parliament on the state of play of the accession negotiations and EU-Croatia relations in the presence of representatives of the Croatian Government. He went on to say:

"I am sometimes seen as somebody who exaggerates when I say that Croatia is about to surrender its independence so I shall let the Croatian people make that judgment. Unfortunately, they have not yet been consulted directly. I just hope that that consultation will be carried out freely and fairly. However, I note that the rules for referendums in the Constitution, the goal posts if you like, are being changed to facilitate a 'Yes vote'."

Although having made a speech as a direct warning to the Croatian Parliament, Brons ended with an abstention in voting to continue negotiations. He justified this by stating:

"I should like my abstention to be placed on record. I shall not vote against Croatia's accession because that might imply that I have some right to act on behalf of Croatian opponents of accession, when I clearly have no such right. The Croatian people must decide for themselves. Furthermore, It might imply that I am somehow hostile to Croatia, when I am emphatically not hostile."

The remaining members of the committee voted unanimously in favour.

On 30 November 2010, Brons again spoke of the negative impact that EU accession would have on the Croatian people, this time in the European Parliament. He used the opportunity to express his concerns over the double standards of the EU in relation to the Lisbon Treaty; he also questioned member states governments' and media impartiality regarding the EU Question, saying:

"The referendum on accession must be free, fair and final. The debate must be conducted with full participation and media coverage for both sides of the debate. I do not want to prejudge the Croatian media but our experience in the UK in 1975 was that there was complete media support for EEC membership and a deluge of propaganda in favour of (continued) membership."

=== British Democratic Party ===
In November 2012, Brons and several other ex-BNP activists formed the British Democratic Party with himself as president of the party.

== Elections contested ==
UK Parliament elections

Date of election	Constituency	Party	Votes	%	Ref
Feb 1974	Harrogate	National Front	1,186	2.3	
Oct 1974	Harrogate	National Front	1,030	2.3	
1977 by-election	Birmingham Stechford	National Front	2,995	8.2	
1979	Bradford North	National Front	614	1.3	
1983	Leeds East	National Front	475	1.1	
2010	Keighley	British National Party	1,962	4.1	

European Parliament elections

Date of election	Region	Party	Votes	%	Result	Ref
2009	Yorkshire and the Humber	British National Party	120,139	9.8	Elected	

== See also ==
- British Democratic Party (2013)
- British National Party
- British National Party (1960)
- National Front (UK)
- National Socialist Movement
