= National Socialist Movement (UK, 1962) =

British neo-Nazi organisation

- Abbreviation: NSM
- Leader: Colin Jordan
- Founder: Colin Jordan
- Founded: 1962
- Dissolved: 1968
- Split from: British National Party
- Succeeded by: British Movement
- Headquarters: Arnold Leese House, Notting Hill, London
- Student wing: National Student Front
- Ideology: British fascism Neo-Nazism
- Political position: Far-right
- International affiliation: World Union of National Socialists

The National Socialist Movement (NSM) was a British neo-Nazi group formed on 20 April, Adolf Hitler's birthday, in 1962, by Colin Jordan, with John Tyndall as his deputy as a splinter group from the original British National Party of the 1960s.

== Formation ==
The 1960s BNP, which had been formed by a merger of Colin Jordan's White Defence League and John Bean's National Labour Party, soon became defined by clashes between the two rival leaders. Impetus for the formation of the NSM came from a 1961 letter to Jordan from George Lincoln Rockwell, leader of the American Nazi Party. Rockwell stated that he agreed with the BNP, except over their lack of openness about Nazism.

Bean however felt that Jordan and his ally Tyndall were too open about Nazism and argued that this damaged the chances of the BNP making any political headway, an issue which came to a head in February 1962 when Bean presented a resolution condemning Jordan's open Nazism at a meeting of the party's national council. The resolution was passed 7 votes to 5 and, after a struggle, the party split with around 80% of the membership backing Bean and the rest leaving with Jordan. Jordan managed to secure the support of Tyndall and Denis Pirie, whilst also gaining control of the BNP's Notting Hill headquarters and the paramilitary Spearhead group, and on 20 April 1962 the new group was inaugurated at a party to celebrate Adolf Hitler's birthday. As well as Tyndall and Pirie, Roland Kerr-Ritchie and Peter Ling both resigned from the BNP National Council to support Jordan. The new group's membership was largely made up of young, working class activists.

== Activities ==
With displays proclaiming "Free Britain From Jewish Control", Jordan spoke at a meeting held in Trafalgar Square on 1 July 1962 which led to a riot. The riot had been sparked after Jordan had made pro-Hitler comments and Tyndall had compared the Jews to "a poisonous maggot" (both comments earning their speakers short prison sentences) leading to nearby crowds of Jewish demonstrators, Communist Party of Great Britain members and Campaign for Nuclear Disarmament supporters attacking the NSM supporters. Jordan however believed that a majority of the British people would agree with his opinions, and that, from a British point of view, the Second World War had been a mistake.

The NSM also endeavoured to keep Spearhead running and to increase its efficacy but Special Branch had already been aware of the group since it was part of the BNP and monitored its activities closely. Indeed, as early as July 1961 two police officers, David Pemble and David Corder, had taken pictures of Tyndall and Kerr-Ritchie directing Spearhead operations in Kent whilst the following year Jordan regularly watched performing military drills at weekends near Dorking. The group also faced opposition from the 62 Group, a movement formed by veterans of the 43 Group specifically to combat the NSM but which later expanded operations to oppose all far-right groups. Led by Harry Bidney, a nightclub owner with links to organised crime in London, the 62 Group had paid informers within the NSM ranks from Jordan's foundation of the group.

== Crackdown ==
In the aftermath of the Trafalgar riot the Sunday People ran a story exposing Spearhead and this, along with pressure from Jewish leaders, led to the government denying travel permits to a number of neo-Nazi leaders due to attend a NSM-sponsored conference in August 1962. Despite this George Lincoln Rockwell was smuggled into Britain via the Republic of Ireland and was hidden in Cheltenham to await the start of the conference. However, before long his whereabouts became known and his hideout was besieged by both journalists and angry locals leading to Rockwell going to London in order to give himself up, although not before he sold his story to the Daily Mail. Although the camp did not take place as planned its aim, the establishment of the World Union of National Socialists, was completed anyway with Jordan named as "World Führer" and Rockwell as his successor. Savitri Devi also attended this event and was a close ally of the NSM from her base in France.

Soon afterwards both Jordan's home in Coventry and the party's London headquarters were raided by police with a wealth of evidence seized, ranging from guns and knives to Nazi insignia and memorabilia and even cans of weedkiller on which the labels had been changed to "Jewkiller". Jordan, Tyndall, Kerr-Ritchie and Pirie were all arrested on 16 August. All four were found guilty of being involved in the formation of Spearhead, an offence under the Public Order Act of 1936, and sentenced to nine months (Jordan), six months (Tyndall) and three months (Pirie and Kerr-Ritchie) in prison with Pirie giving the Nazi salute to the court as they were led out. During their time in prison the NSM was left in the hands of Martin Webster, a youthful member who had come to the NSM from the Young Conservatives where he had also been linked with the League of Empire Loyalists.

== Split ==
French heiress Françoise Dior had been linked to the NSM from 1962 and had become romantically involved with Jordan, before also taking up with Tyndall following the latter's release from prison. However following Jordan's own release the two were back on and they were married on 5 October 1963 in a ceremony that involved each allowing a drop of blood to fall onto a copy of Mein Kampf. Although the couple separated only three months later and were divorced, following a failed attempt at reconciliation, in 1967 the marriage drove a rift between Tyndall and Jordan which was complicated further by increasing ideological differences between the two men and a growing power base for the London-based Tyndall against the Coventry-based Jordan. Tyndall had increasingly echoed Bean's earlier criticisms of Jordan's open Nazism and at the April 1964 NSM conference Tyndall demanded that control of the movement be handed over to him. Tyndall was expelled on 11 May 1964 and the following day Tyndall claimed that he had expelled Jordan and assumed control of the movement. However ultimately Tyndall broke from the NSM, taking most of the HQ staff with him, and his followers would later emerge as the Greater Britain Movement. Before long the National Student Front, small group led by James McIntyre that worked for the NSM in universities, had also departed to offer support to Tyndall instead.

== Final years ==
During the 1964 general election the NSM was active in Smethwick where they campaigned for Conservative candidate Peter Griffiths against Shadow Foreign Secretary Patrick Gordon Walker, a hate figure for the far right for his perceived role in allowing high levels of immigration. During the campaign a number of publicity grabbing stunts were attempted, including an NSM member dressing up as a monkey and another attempting to register for election as Gordon-Walker the "race-mixing" candidate whilst dressed as a character from The Black and White Minstrel Show.

The campaign against Walker intensified in 1965 when Colin Jordan took to the stage of a public meeting addressed by Denis Healey, who punched Jordan. Membership of the group fell to almost nothing overnight, after the arrest of several members accused of burning synagogues and convictions for such incidents in Clapton, Ilford, Bayswater and Kilburn. Even Dior was imprisoned for such an attack in 1968 and in all during the 1960s, NSM supporters organised 34 arson attacks against Jewish owned buildings. By this time Dior's marriage to Jordan had ended and as a result her funding of the NSM had ended.

The movement was affected by new race relations legislation. Jordan was arrested under the new laws and gaoled for eighteen months in January 1967 for distributing a leaflet entitled The Coloured Invasion which was described as "a vituperative attack on black and Asian immigrants" in Jordan's 2009 obituary in The Times. Regardless of Jordan's status as imprisoned or otherwise there had been no intention of including the NSM in negotiations going on at the time between the BNP, LEL, GBM and Racial Preservation Society as one of LEL leader A. K. Chesterton's stipulations for the formation of any new party was that neo-Nazis should have to be excluded, a condition that ensured that the GBM as a group were excluded and even initially kept Bean out of the leading positions in the new National Front. Following Jordan's release from prison in 1968 he held a secret meeting with Tyndall and Webster at Denis Pirie's house and informed those present that the NSM was no longer in existence.

== Legacy ==
Following the collapse of the NSM Jordan used elements of it to establish a new group, the British Movement, in May 1968. This group has continued to exist in various forms to date. Not all members joined the British Movement with other turning up in more "respectable" groups on the far right that avowedly eschewed Nazism such as the NF. Not least among these was Andrew Brons, who served as MEP for Yorkshire and the Humber from 2009 to 2014, who was an early member of the NSM in the 1960s.

Another group bearing the NSM name was set up in the late 1990s by David Myatt and other Combat 18 dissidents but it is not directly related to either the original NSM or the British Movement.

== See also ==
- National Socialist Movement (United Kingdom)
- National Socialist Movement (United States)
- National Socialist Movement of Denmark
- National Socialist Movement of Norway
