= Empire Loyalists =

Empire Loyalists may refer to

- United Empire Loyalists, American Loyalists who settled in British North America during or after the American War of Independence
- League of Empire Loyalists, a pressure group which opposed the end of the British Empire
