= British Movement =

British Neo-Nazi organisation

- Abbreviation: BM
- Leader: Colin Jordan (1968–1975); Michael McLaughlin (1975–1983)
- Founder: Colin Jordan
- Founded: 1968
- Preceded by: National Socialist Movement
- Succeeded by: British National Socialist Movement
- Headquarters: Coventry
- Newspaper: The Phoenix, British Patriot
- Youth wing: National Youth Movement
- Membership (June 2026): 300
- Ideology: Neo-Nazism
- Political position: Far-right
- International affiliation: World Union of National Socialists
- Colours: Red White Blue

Party flag

Website
- britishmovement.info

The British Movement (BM), later called the British National Socialist Movement (BNSM), is a British neo-Nazi organisation founded by Colin Jordan in 1968. It grew out of the National Socialist Movement (NSM), which was founded in 1962. Frequently on the margins of the British far-right, the BM has had a long and chequered history for its association with violence and extremism. It was founded as a political party but manifested itself more as a pressure and activist group. It has had spells of dormancy.

== Formation ==
The NSM had come to an end sometime after Colin Jordan was imprisoned in early 1967 for distributing a racist leaflet The Coloured Invasion and following his release Jordan had met John Tyndall in Denis Pirie's house about the possibility of joining the National Front. These talks came to nothing however and with the Race Relations Act 1968 passed the notion of openly parading Nazi credentials in a party name had to be abandoned, leading to Jordan forming a new group to known as the British Movement. Whilst the new party intended to continue the old group's role of being Nazi apologists and endorsing anti-Semitism it aimed to do so within the restrictions brought in by the newly enacted law.

== Violence ==
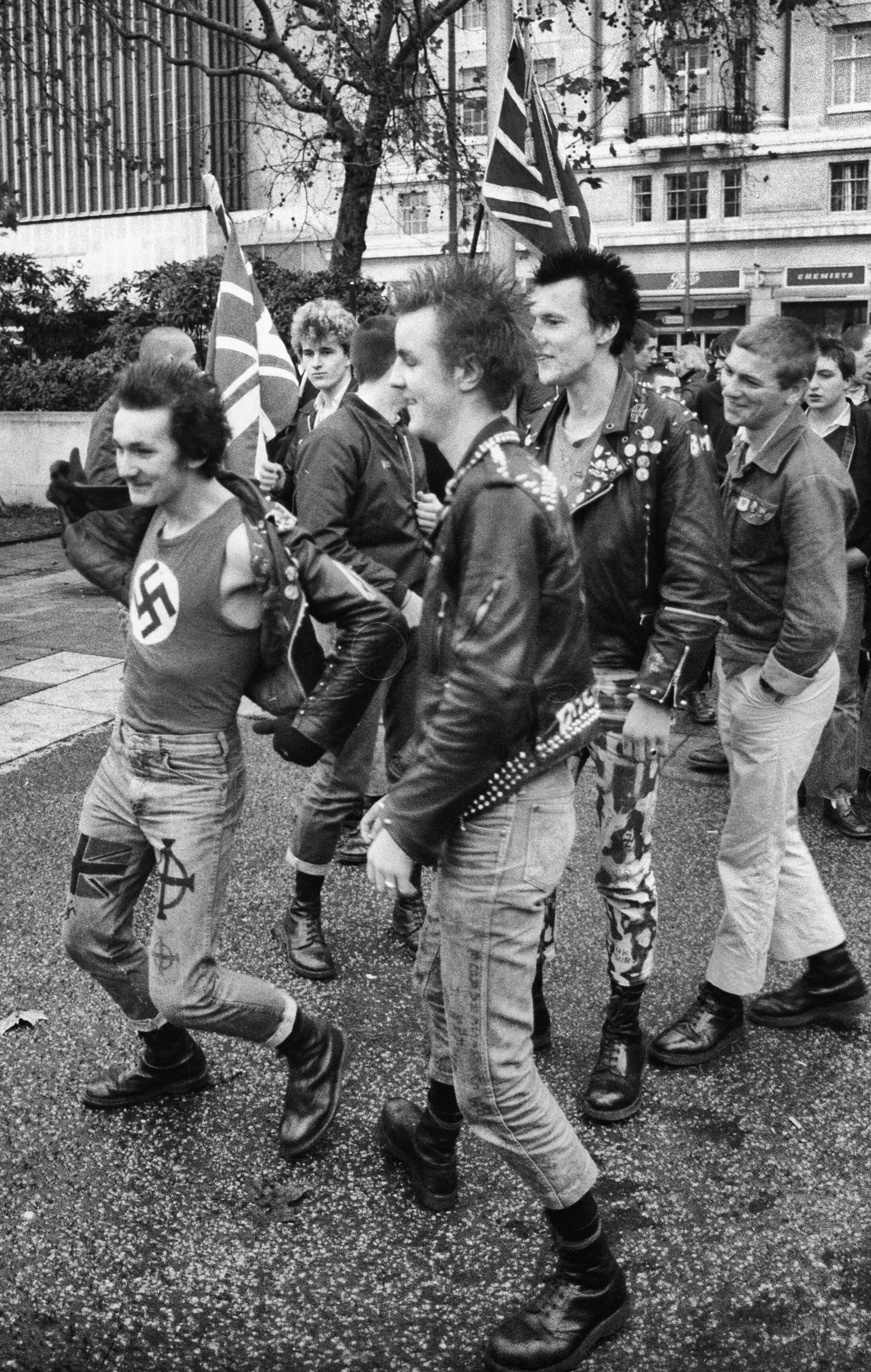
Skinhead and punk supporters of BM, London, circa 1979

Not long after its formation the BM gained news coverage in Leicester, where a growing Midlands branch was being organised by Ray Hill, when local members attacked students who were supporting an Anti-Apartheid Movement protest against a South African trade delegation visiting the city. Direct action activities such as this, which usually ended in violence, became the stock in trade of the BM during its early days. An underground cell, the National Socialist Group, was also established in Blackheath by David Courtney and this undertook paramilitary training exercises in Scotland whilst also seeking to build links between the BM and like-minded groups in Europe. The group vanished suddenly in 1969 when Special Branch began to investigate them, with Courtney in particular dropping out of the far-right scene for some time afterwards.

Despite this setback, violence remained on the agenda as the party maintained a "Leader Guard" of violent members whom it encouraged to join the Territorial Army, as well as a Women's Division and a National Youth Movement. Members of the BM also took part in paramilitary training exercises in Germany. One of the BM's fiercest street fighters, Nicky Crane, led and organised several violent attacks by the BM on non-whites. Following a BM meeting in May 1978, Nicky Crane and other BM members took part in an assault on a black family at a bus stop in Bishopsgate, east London using broken bottles. In 1979, Crane and BM members were part of 200-strong skinhead mob that attacked Asians on Brick Lane, east London. Crane also led and instigated the Woolwich Odeon attack of 1980. After their intended victims ran inside the Odeon cinema to escape attack, Crane and BM members started smashing windows and doors. One Pakistani man was knocked unconscious.

Convictions were not uncommon. Crane was jailed in 1981 for his part in an ambush on black youths at Woolwich Arsenal station. An Old Bailey judge described Crane as "worse than an animal" after his part in the May 1978 bus stop attack in Bishopsgate. Other BM members felt the force of the law as was the case in January 1981 when three members, Rod Roberts, Harvey Stock and Robert Giles, were arrested for possession of illegal weapons and attempted arson with Roberts imprisoned for seven years as a result.

== Political activity ==
The BM entered electoral politics in 1969 when Jordan put himself forward as a candidate for the Birmingham Ladywood by-election. The campaign made no attempts to hide the party's support for Nazism and violence became the hallmark, not least on the election night itself when scuffles at the count were televised nationally. The 3.5% vote share that the BM secured was treated as a success by activists who felt that it proved that even with a Nazi message nearly 300 people were still prepared to vote for an anti-immigration candidate. Indeed, the BM members had openly worn the German Nazi Swastika symbol, and party literature featured pictures of Nazi leader Adolf Hitler.

The BM contested the UK general elections in 1970 and in February 1974. The party failed to attract much support in those elections due to its openness about its support for Nazism, and because most of the far right vote went to the National Front (NF). The group's highest result was the 2.5% share which Jordan captured in Birmingham Aston in 1970. Nonetheless, contact between the BM and NF was not infrequent and in early 1972 John Tyndall had met with Jordan and discussed the possibility that the BM might form the basis of a new NF group in the Midlands, an area of BM strength and NF weakness. The proposal was soon dropped however and was largely made only because Tyndall was seeking to build a power-base in his attempts to replace John O'Brien as NF chairman. For his part, Jordan had a long-held ambition to unite the divided far-right and he personally oversaw the production of a BM leaflet, Nationalist Solidarity in '70, in which he called for personal disagreements to be set aside in favour of presenting a united front. There were occasional examples of individuals holding simultaneous membership of the BM and NF, although they were not linked at any official level.

Jordan's run as leader came to an end in 1975 when he was arrested in the Coventry branch of Tesco on a charge of shoplifting. Jordan declared that the event, and the reports that the item he had stolen were a pair of women's knickers, was a frame-up, but soon after he resigned as leader of the BM to take on an advisory role.

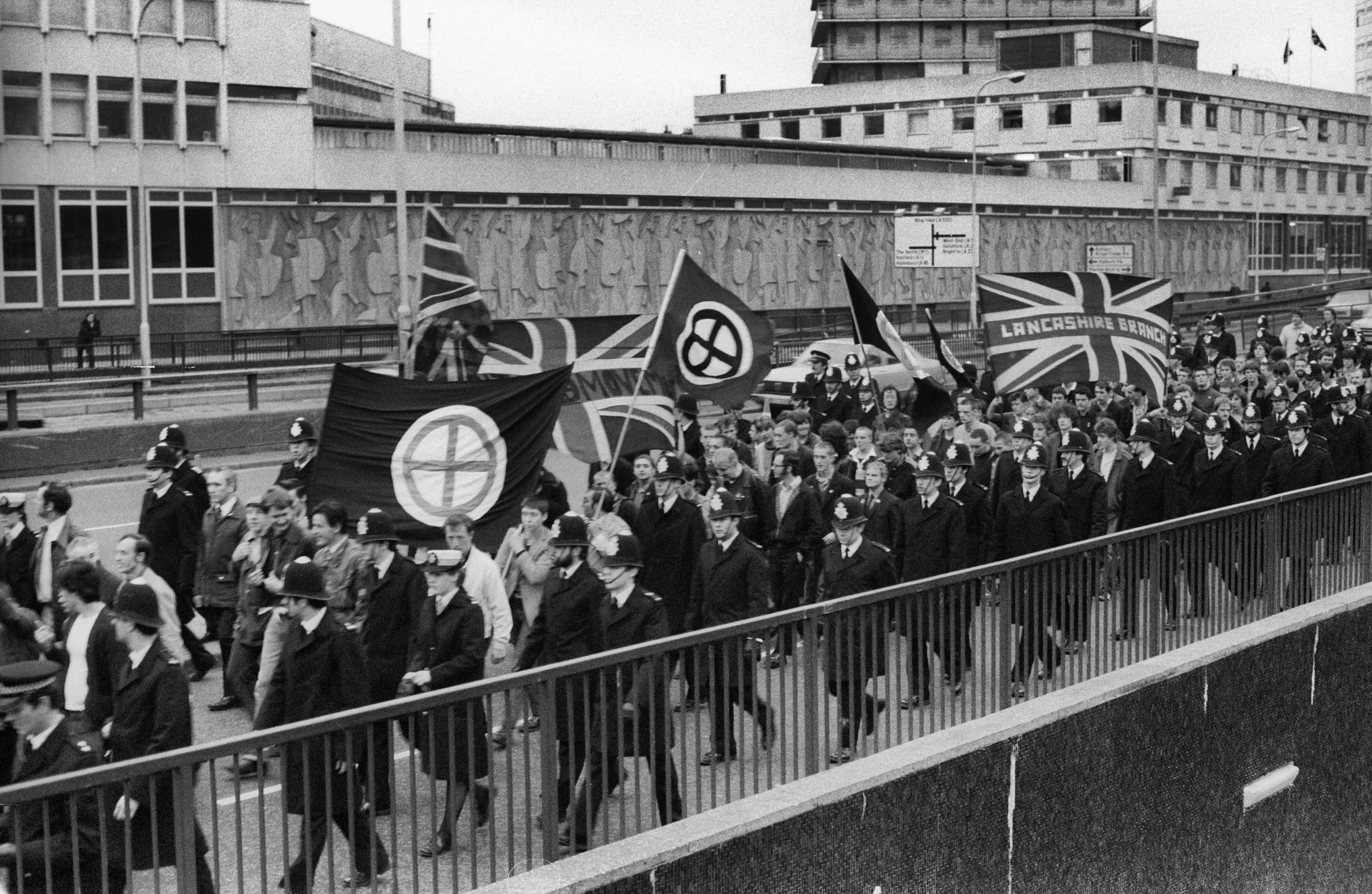
A British Movement march in London, circa 1979.

== Post-Jordan ==
After Jordan stood down as leader of the BM, Michael McLaughlin, a former milkman from Liverpool, became the leader. McLaughlin, who was seen as a talented organiser but weak leader, was largely believed to have been chosen as little more than a "front" leader who could be controlled by Jordan from behind the scenes. McLaughlin quickly rejected this notion and made it clear that Jordan's time was over, resulting in the former leader retiring to Yorkshire from where he still published his own journal Gothic Ripples from time to time, the pages of which were regularly filled with criticism of McLaughlin.

McLaughlin, in contrast to Jordan, was under no delusions that the BM might gain a broad following and instead he felt that its best area of possible support was amongst young, working-class males. The BM journals, The Phoenix and British Patriot, thus changed to become much more simplistic and aggressive publications largely shorn of Jordan's pseudoscientific racialism in favour of more basic notions. The BM had also gained some publicity in 1976 when "race martyr" and sometime party activist Robert Relf went on hunger strike in protest at the Race Relations Bill but this proved short-lived as Tyndall quickly signed Relf up to the NF. Relf had gained national attention after he advertised his house as being "For Sale - to a white family only". Meanwhile, McLaughlin's baser ideas struck a chord with the growing White power skinhead movement and large numbers of these youths, many of whom were involved in regular acts of violence against non-Whites, flocked to the BM. By 1980 it claimed to have 4,000 members and 25 branches.

The notion of recruiting violent youths to form a street army appealed to Martin Webster who attempted to coax members away from the BM to the NF but the BM only lost a handful of members in this manner before NF leader John Tyndall, mindful of the desire to present a respectable NF image, called a halt to the scheme. A key strategy for gaining publicity and members was by encouraging violence at football matches and concerts. Nicky Crane, one of the leading figures of the neo-Nazi skinhead movement, joined the BM and became an organiser in Kent. By this time the BM had effectively given up mainstream politics in favour of provocative marches and violence, changes that appealed to the younger element who were disillusioned with the disintegrating NF.

== Ray Hill's return ==
In 1980, Ray Hill, who had been a leading member of the BM under Jordan before emigrating to South Africa, rejoined the group and soon became one of its leading figures, a decision prompted by the anti-fascist magazine Searchlight, for whom Hill had become a mole. Hill was appointed Area Leader in the East Midlands where he was given responsibility for enticing disaffected NF members to join the BM. Before long Hill had added about thirty members in Leicester and had also built a close working relationship with the British Democratic Party in the city. Hill also managed to ensure publicity for the BM from the Leicester Mercury after a riot in the city, a fact that won him the admiration of McLaughlin.

Following an incident at a Birmingham hotel in which NF supporters had entered a room booked by the BM and daubed the walls with graffiti Hill suggested to McLaughlin that the breach in security had been the fault of Steve Brady, a leading figure in the League of St. George and the only non-BM member invited to the event. McLaughlin appointed Hill to head up an "anti-subversion unit" as a result, although a lack of funding ensured that the unit never actually convened. Nonetheless Hill continued to criticise Brady to McLaughlin and before long Hill had been promoted to the head of the entire Midlands region following the retirement of Birmingham chief Peter Marriner.

Under Searchlight direction Hill sought to take charge of the BM and he launched his campaign at a demonstration in Welling in October 1980 organised by Crane. Attending in McLaughlin's stead after the BM leader had asked him to Hill made frequent references to other organisers present about allegations that McLaughlin was letting them do the work whilst he stayed behind at BM headquarters in Lampeter collecting membership fees. A speech criticising the police at a BM rally in Paddington helped to cement Hill's popularity amongst the rank and file membership, most of whom held police in contempt.

After he opened contact with Jordan, Hill was expelled from the BM by McLaughlin in 1981. Hill was backed by his Leicester branch, London organiser Tony Malski and Robert Relf and his lieutenant Mike Cole, all of whom backed Hill to replace McLaughlin as leader. Hill released a statement to BM members rejecting the expulsion and threatening a court injunction to overturn the expulsion. With legal advice provided by British Democratic Party leader Anthony Reed Herbert, Hill soon issued the writ against McLaughlin, who attempted to get around the problems by renaming the BM the British Nationalist and Socialist Movement and claiming that the BM in fact no longer existed.

== Collapse ==
About half of the members of the BM went with Hill out and joined the newly launched British National Party in 1982, a huge blow to McLaughlin's group. The party failed to contest the 1983 general election, although a single candidate had attempted to stand in Peterborough as a Labour Party candidate; he was barred by the returning officer after several signatures on the nominating papers were found to be invalid. McLaughlin finally announced the closure of the BM in September 1983 and in the statement blamed the court case brought by Ray Hill which had severely depleted BM funds.

== New group ==
A group calling itself the British Movement continued to operate after September 1983 under the leadership of Stephen Frost, a Yorkshire member of the original BM. At its 1985 yearly meeting the BM established a new group to be known as the British National Socialist Movement (BNSM). Whilst the BM continued to exist alongside the BNSM the latter gave more freedom to activists by operating as a cell-based structure within the BM. The new group attempted to act as a rallying-point for white power skinheads, although this role was later filled more successfully by Blood and Honour. It also continued to have involvement in football hooliganism and BM members were amongst the rioters responsible for the Heysel Stadium disaster at the 1985 European Cup final.

The BNSM was soon attempting to re-activate the old BM membership and followed the old template of encouraging members to undergo military training through the Territorial Army or other means. The BNSM built up links with the Ulster Defence Association and Ulster Volunteer Force and BNSM members served with the English companies of these Ulster loyalist paramilitaries. The group, which had about 300 members by 1990, also sought links with European groups and was close to the Dutch former SS man Et Wolsink who was variously connected to Dutch People's Union and the Dutch sections of the Wiking-Jugend and the Action Front of National Socialists/National Activists. Links were also built with the white power music scene of Blood and Honour and in particular with Ian Stuart Donaldson who, despite his previous membership of the NF, was close to Cat Mee, a BM organiser in Derbyshire. Donaldson's attempts to leave the skinhead scene and scale back his involvement in music soured the relationship, however, and links were severed in 1990 after a group of activists turned up at Donaldson's local pub and told him to play for them or face assault.

The progress of the BNSM was halted in the early 1990s by the emergence of Combat 18 with much of the membership switching allegiance to this new group. The new BM re-emerged during the mid-1990s by becoming heavily involved in the distribution of white power music. By this time Michael 'Micky' Lane had taken over as leader (BM National Chairman) of the group from Daniel Tolan (with Stephen Frost becoming BM National Secretary), a position that meant Lane's name appeared on an alleged Combat 18 hitlist due to the rivalries between the groups. Although a British Movement still exists, it has a tiny, largely inactive, membership. It does, however, maintain a presence on the internet, publishes a monthly newspaper called The Emblem, a monthly BM members' newsletter called The Sunwheel and a quarterly magazine called Broadsword, and is occasionally the subject of newspaper reports and media attention.

The Annual State of Hate Report for 2021 published by Hope Not Hate says that while the British Movement is a "mere shadow of its heyday self from the early 1980s" it has been "surprisingly resilient" and remains active during a period when many far-right groups have folded. "It has active units in south London and Kent, South Wales, the East Midlands, Yorkshire and Humber, Scotland and Northern Ireland," the report says. "Its activists hold meetings, host white power concerts, coordinate leafleting and postering sessions for activists and attend demonstrations and protests. It also produces a quarterly magazine and regular newsletters." A spokesperson for Campaign Against Antisemitism said, "The persistence of far-right activity is totally unacceptable. It is particularly worrying that many of these groups deliberately target and recruit impressionable youngsters. The apparent endurance of the neo-Nazi British National Socialist Movement is especially disconcerting, as is the formation of newer groups peddling similar antisemitic and racist ideologies."

=== Michael Gove assessment ===
On 14 March 2024, Michael Gove, the secretary of state for levelling up, housing and communities, speaking in Parliament, named the organisation as one of several regarded as "a cause for concern" and which will be assessed against a newly introduced official UK government definition of extremism.

== Present day activities ==
=== Online presence ===
The British Movement has continued operations into the 2000s, most notably by the uses of social media to attempt to make a new political presence and to influence the British public in their ways. BM social media accounts are present on X (formerly Twitter), Telegram, and Blogger, and even have their own active website. They normally post BM-related propaganda on their X page, consisting of propaganda designs and generative AI material, while on their blog page they often post updates on physical BM activity. Their Telegram channel is for the recruiting of new members.

=== Physical presence ===
It is uncommon to see the British Movement at a modern day British patriotic or nationalistic rally. Frequently, campaigners from BM can often show up alongside campaigners from similar far-right organisation Patriotic Alternative. They often have a fairly small attendance of activists, ranging from around 1-15 at a time.

Other BM activists place propaganda stickers on public property, mostly on lampposts and benches and handrails. Some BM activists take to the streets of certain cities and perform their activism and hand out leaflets.
