= White Defence League =

British far-right political organisation

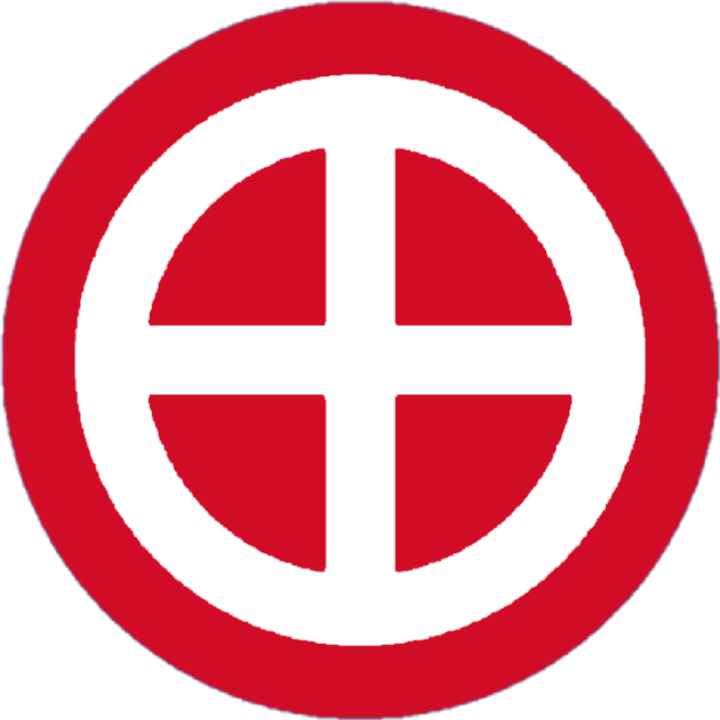
- Abbreviation: WDL
- Leader: Colin Jordan
- Founder: Colin Jordan
- Founded: 1957
- Dissolved: 1960
- Preceded by: League of Empire Loyalists
- Succeeded by: British National Party
- Headquarters: Arnold Leese House, Notting Hill, London
- Newspaper: Black and White News; The Nationalist
- Ideology: Neo-Nazism; British nationalism White nationalism Anti-capitalism; Anti-communism; Antisemitism
- Political position: Far-right
- Colours: Red White Blue

Party flag
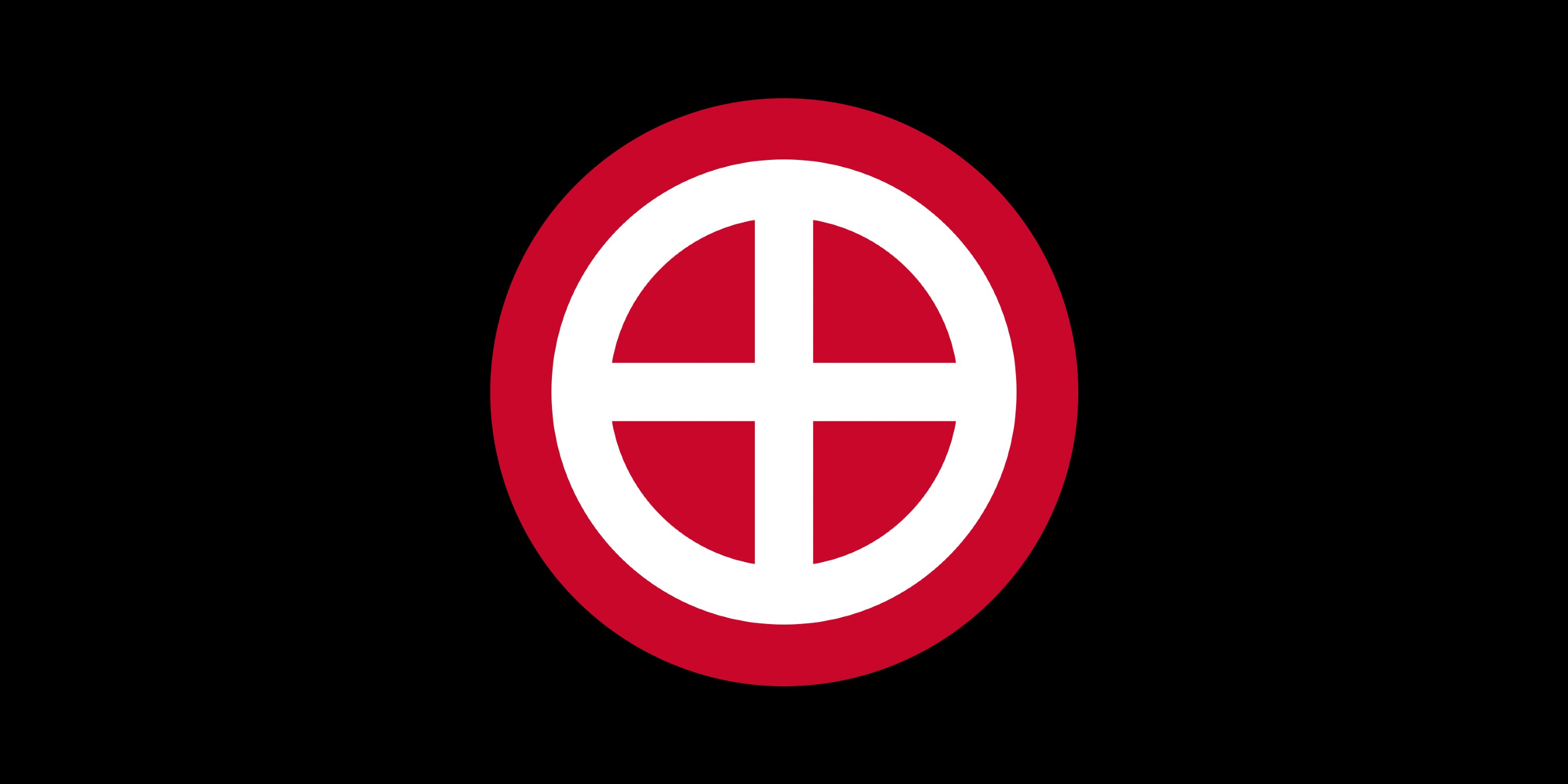

The White Defence League (WDL) was a British neo-Nazi political party. Using the provocative marching techniques popularised by Oswald Mosley, its members included John Tyndall.

== Formation ==
The WDL had its roots in Colin Jordan's decision to split from the League of Empire Loyalists in 1957. Jordan had wanted a ban on Jews and non-white members enshrined in the League but this had been rejected by League chief A. K. Chesterton, due to the group's links to the Conservative Party. Jordan further called for the building of a mass party but this too was rejected due to the Tory links. At the time Jordan was also close to the Britons Publishing Society and both groups ran out of Arnold Leese House, the name given to 74 Princedale Road, the Notting Hill home of the late Imperial Fascist League leader which Leese's widow Mary allowed Jordan to use as his base of operations. Mary Leese also provided most of the group's funding. Because of this shared space with the Britons the WDL was able to publish its own magazine, Black and White News, as soon the group was founded, and it reached a circulation of around 800 with a focus on anti-immigration rhetoric. A further WDL paper, The Nationalist, appeared in 1959, focusing more on antisemitism and the desire for racial purity.

== Ideology ==
Unlike the LEL, which stressed British identity and patriotism, the WDL was fairly open in its admiration for Adolf Hitler and Nazism. Seeking to distance itself from LEL conservatism and to build links with like-minded groups in continental Europe, the party's journals became notorious for their rabid racial hatred. By personal conviction Jordan's main belief was in antisemitism but, whilst the WDL did stress the Jews as an enemy "out-group", the League also emphasised anti-immigration rhetoric. However the WDL has been contrasted with the Union Movement, a contemporary group led by Oswald Mosley as, whilst the Union Movement had a coherent ideology that sought to remodel pre-Second World War fascism, the WDL was more crudely racist and had a much less developed political programme. Hans-Georg Betz has characterised the WDL as part of a tendency within British fascist extremism to place a "recidivist or radical neo-Nazism" as the ideological core rather than the populism of Scandinavian protest parties or the "hybrid appeal" that fuses elements of fascism to populism typified by the likes the Front National (italics are after Betz).

== Activities ==
The WDL gained notoriety after members of the group were widely reported in the press as having taken part in the 1958 Notting Hill race riots. Indeed, during that summer the WDL held rallies through immigrant neighbourhoods on a nightly basis. Towards the end of the riots Antiguan immigrant Kelso Cochrane was murdered and local black opinion often suggested that the WDL was responsible although ultimately no one was arrested for the killing. Like the Union Movement, which was also active in the local area, the WDL co-operated with gangs of racist Teddy boys who harassed and launched attacks on blacks in the area. Indeed, in the run-up to the riots followers of the Union Movement and the WDL had come into immigrant neighbourhoods in the area to indulge in what they called "nigger hunts".

In 1959 the WDL began to co-operate with the National Labour Party, a group led by another former LEL dissident John Bean which was also active in Notting Hill. The WDL helped Bean's group with their election campaigns and the two groups held a joint rally called Stop the Coloured Invasion in Trafalgar Square in May 1959 with banners that read Keep Britain White. Some marchers wore armbands containing the WDL logo; a white sun wheel within a red circle on a dark blue background. Jordan, who had developed a network of international contacts through The Nationalist, impressed both Bean and Andrew Fountaine and in February 1960 the two groups fused to form the British National Party, which was also to be based at Arnold Leese House.

== See also ==
- British National Party
- British National Front
- White supremacy
