= Patriotic Party (UK) =

British far-right political party

The Patriotic Party was a far right political party in the United Kingdom.

The group began life as the True Tories in 1962 when Major-General Richard Hilton, formerly a leading member of the League of Empire Loyalists, set up his own nationalistic group with a membership largely made up of former military figures. The group adopted the "Patriotic Party" name for the 1964 general election and sponsored two candidates. During the campaign the party split, with the deputy chairman and former Liberal Party election candidate Major Arthur Rossi Braybrooke (1902–1989) continuing the Patriotic Party and General Hilton re-establishing the True Tories. The two candidates polled only 1,108 votes between them.

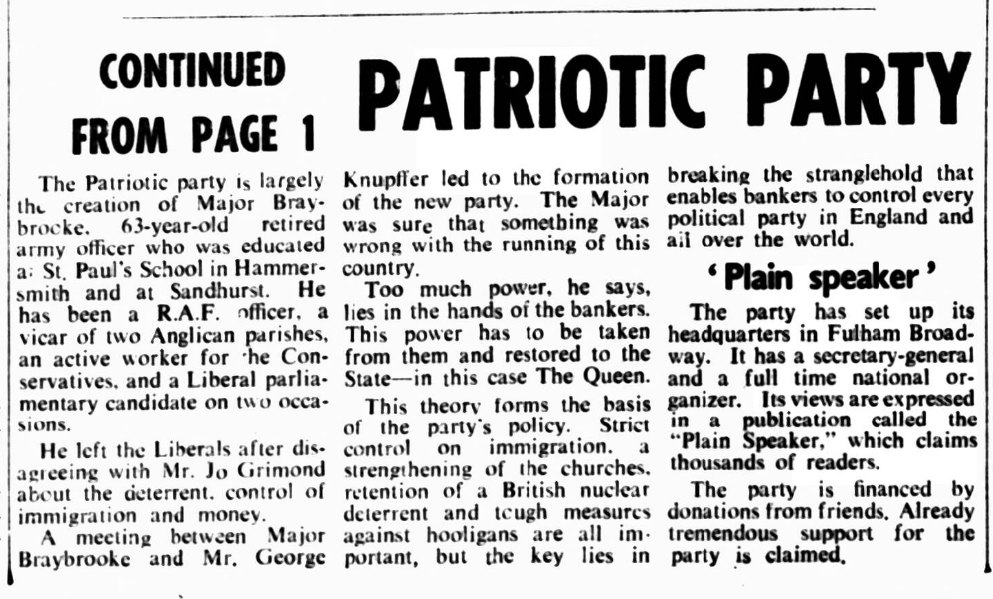
Hammersmith & Shepherds Bush Gazette, Thursday 27 January 1966

In 1965, Braybrooke said that, at the next election, his party would "have the support of the New Liberals, with whose policies the Patriotic Party is in sympathy". In 1966, Braybrooke said that his party "now has the support of the New Liberals under Mr Alan Lomas, and the League of Empire Loyalists".

However, Braybrooke's candidacy in the 1966 general election attracted even less support than in 1964.

Hilton's True Tories failed to take off and he became associated with the 1960s British National Party, before the remnants of both the Patriotic Party and the True Tories were absorbed by the National Front on its foundation in 1967.

== Election results ==
=== 1964 UK general election ===
| Constituency | Candidate | Votes | Percentage | Position |
|---|---|---|---|---|
| Dorking | Barbara Davies | 476 | 1.1 | 4 |
| Fulham | Arthur Braybrooke | 632 | 1.8 | 3 |

=== 1966 UK general election ===
| Constituency | Candidate | Votes | Percentage | Position |
|---|---|---|---|---|
| Fulham | Arthur Braybrooke | 126 | 0.4 | 6 |
