= Martin Webster =

British neo-Nazi (born 1943)

National Activities Organiser of the National Front
- In office 1969–1983

Personal details
- Born: 14 May 1943 (age 83)
- Party: League of Empire Loyalists, National Socialist Movement; 1962–1964; Greater Britain Movement; 1964–1967; National Front; 1967–1983; Our Nation; 1983

Martin Guy Alan Webster (born 14 May 1943) is a British neo-Nazi and a former leading figure on the far-right in the United Kingdom. An early member of the National Labour Party (NLP), he was John Tyndall's closest ally, and followed him in joining the original British National Party (BNP), the National Socialist Movement (NSM) and the Greater Britain Movement. Webster also spent time in prison for helping to organise a paramilitary organisation, Spearhead, and was convicted under the Public Order Act 1936. Rumours of his homosexuality led to him becoming vilified in far-right circles, and he quietly disappeared from the political scene.

== Early political activism ==
An early member of the Young Conservatives, from which he claimed to have been expelled, Webster was associated loosely with the League of Empire Loyalists until he joined the National Socialist Movement (NSM) in 1962. He became Tyndall's closest ally within the NSM, and followed him in joining the Greater Britain Movement. Webster also spent time in prison for knocking Jomo Kenyatta to the ground outside the London Hilton hotel, and for helping to organise the paramilitary organisation Spearhead. He was convicted under the Public Order Act 1936. He attracted further notice in 1972 when he was recorded as saying, "We are busy setting up a well-oiled Nazi machine in this country."

== National Front ==
=== With Tyndall ===
He continued to be a lieutenant to Tyndall, and followed him into the National Front (NF). Webster proved an early success in the NF, being appointed National Activities Organiser in 1969, and from that position effectively shared the leadership of the party with Tyndall until 1974. Webster clashed with Tyndall's replacement John Kingsley Read, and the clash set in motion Kingsley Read's downfall, allowing Tyndall to return to the leadership. Webster later broke with Tyndall, while remaining one of the most prominent figures in the NF during the subsequent chairmanship of Andrew Brons.

Shortly after the police decided, under the Public Order Act 1936, to ban an NF march through Hyde town centre on the grounds that it was likely to be a focus of "serious disturbances", Webster announced in October 1977 that there would be two NF marches, the second being conducted by him alone. Watched by a crowd of members of the public and surrounded by an estimated 2,500 police, he marched down the main street of Hyde carrying a Union Flag and a sign reading "Defend British Free Speech from Red Terrorism". Webster was allowed to march, as 'one man' did not constitute a breaking of the ban. The tactic split the Anti-Nazi League (ANL) in two and made a farce of the ban, while attracting more media publicity for the NF.

In 1982, Webster – after making claims about the activities of the ANL – was sued for libel by Peter Hain, then one of its leading members. In court, he admitted that ANL activity had severely damaged the NF.

=== Later NF activity and expulsion ===
Rumours of Webster's homosexuality led to his becoming vilified within right-wing nationalist circles, and he also fell foul of the Political Soldier wing of the NF. In 1983, they ensured that he lost his position as National Activities Organiser, then deprived him of his place on the National Directorate, before expelling him from the party altogether along with his ally Michael Salt.

== Our Nation ==
Webster briefly attempted to lead his own group, Our Nation, although this was to prove unsuccessful. He viewed his new movement as being along the lines of the NF before the resignation of Tyndall; however, they had clashed before the expulsion, and so Webster was not invited to join Tyndall's British National Party (BNP). Webster sought out Françoise Dior, who had by then split from Colin Jordan and returned to France, as a source of funding. Despite managing to secure a small sum from Dior, he soon found that his low reputation across the far right made it very difficult for him to attract members to his movement. Although long-standing activist Denis Pirie played a role in organising the group, his input was cut short by newspaper articles revealing that he had been involved whilst employed at a high level in the civil service. As a result, Our Nation never really got off the ground; before long Webster was forced to abandon his plans. He was not admitted to the Flag Group after Ian Anderson had supported his initial expulsion from the NF (despite being otherwise an opponent of Nick Griffin and Patrick Harrington).

== Current activity ==
Webster has been semi-retired from political activity for some time (although he was associated with Lady Birdwood before her death). He re-emerged in 1999, to claim that he had a four-year homosexual affair with Nick Griffin (in 1999, the newly elected BNP leader) that had begun in the mid-1970s, when Griffin was a teenager. Griffin has denied any such relationship.

Webster composes occasional e-bulletins, under the title "Electronic Loose Cannon", and "Electronic Watch on Zion". He has also written for the Occidental Observer website.

In 2010, Webster spoke at the 29th meeting of the New Right, giving a lecture on the Middle East conflict in favour of the Palestinian cause. In August 2011, he spoke at the 29th New Right meeting on Justice for the Palestinians.

== Elections contested ==
Date of election	Constituency	Party	Votes	%
24 May 1973 (by-election)	West Bromwich	NF	4,789	16.0
February 1974	West Bromwich East	NF	2,907	7.0
1979	Bethnal Green and Bow	NF	1,740	6.1
28 October 1982 (by-election)	Peckham	NF	874	3.9

== See also ==
- National Front (UK)
- White supremacy
