= John Bean (politician) =

British far-right activist (1927–2021)

- Born: John Edward Bean; 27 June 1927; Carshalton, Surrey, England
- Died: 9 November 2021 (aged 94)
- Occupations: Activist; writer
- Political party: Union Movement; Conservative Party; League of Empire Loyalists; National Labour Party; British National Party; National Front; British National Party; British Democratic Party

John Edward Bean (27 June 1927 – 9 November 2021) was a British political activist and writer, who was a long-standing participant in far-right politics in the United Kingdom, and a number of its movements.

== Early life ==
Born in Carshalton, Surrey, at the age of 13 he suffered the trauma of being bombed out with his family living in Blackfen, Sidcup, February 1941. Bean said that he briefly flirted with communism whilst at school, calling for support for the Soviet Union. His initial fervour soon faded and by the time he began his National service in 1945, Bean was largely apolitical. Initially he was a trainee navigator in the RAF Volunteer Reserve and later as a sailor in the Royal Navy. Bean became a radar mechanic and was placed on HMS Bulawayo, a fleet supply ship which made several visits to Trinidad until the end of his naval service in June 1948. He briefly lived in India during 1950, working as a chemist in a paint factory, although he failed to settle and returned to Britain six months later.

== Politics ==
=== Union Movement ===
Upon his return, Bean began to attend meetings of the Union Movement, being attracted by the Europe a Nation policy and by the time Oswald Mosley had spent in prison for his beliefs. Bean initially served as a member of the Special Propaganda Service, the main duty of which was to sell copies of the party's newspaper Union. Soon however he became a leading figure active on behalf of the UM in the East End of London, before being appointed to head a branch in Putney in 1952. Despite these advancements, Bean grew disillusioned of the UM's chances of making any real headway and he left them altogether in February 1953. A brief stopover in the local Conservative Party in Barnes followed but lasted only two months.

=== National Labour Party and BNP ===
Following a spell on the sidelines he then linked up with Andrew Fountaine, who had been attempting to form his own party, the National Front, and began to produce a journal, National Unity. His work attracted the attention of A. K. Chesterton and, with the National Front idea failing to get off the ground, he decided to join the League of Empire Loyalists, serving as its Northern Organiser and then in the HQ in London. Continuing to produce his paper, now called The Loyalist, Bean soon became frustrated at both the lack of political activity and the links to the Conservative Party that were the hallmarks of the LEL, and so left in 1957 to set up the National Labour Party with Fountaine. Fountaine, a Norfolk landowner from a rural landowning family, was officially President of the new group, but was largely a figurehead: control actually lay with Bean.

The NLP gained a few minor results in elections, but was always destined to be a small fringe movement, and as a result Bean decided to merge his party with another LEL splinter group, the White Defence League, in 1960 to form the British National Party. Bean was made leader of the party upon its foundation. Early in the group's life, both Bean and former White Defence League leader Colin Jordan were approached by Oswald Mosley, who offered them roles in his Union Movement if they agreed to its subsuming the BNP, but both men rejected the offer.

Initially gaining some support in London, the party soon ran into trouble when it became clear that Colin Jordan was emerging as its spokesman. A journalist commented in 1962 that Jordan was becoming the British Adolf Hitler. Bean jokingly responded to the Daily Mail reporter that that made him "the British Joseph Goebbels". Despite this, Bean soon clashed with Jordan over his extremism and before long Jordan had left to form the National Socialist Movement, taking emerging figures John Tyndall and Denis Pirie with him. Matters had come to a head at the party's national council meeting in 1962 when Bean proposed a motion to condemn Jordan's open support for Nazism. It was passed 7 to 5, but the party immediately split as a result, albeit with around 80% of the membership remaining within the BNP. Bean had blamed the associations with Nazism that Jordan and Tyndall brought for the party's marginal position in British politics.

At the 1964 general election Bean stood as BNP candidate in Southall and obtained 3,410 votes (9.3%), the highest post-war vote for a minority party at that time. Another BNP candidate picked up nearly 2,000 votes in Deptford. In 1966 he again stood in Southall but his vote fell to 2,600. With BNP membership only marginally increasing, Bean felt the need to try to create a nationalist front with like groups and arranged, with the help of Ted Budden, a private meeting with his old mentor A.K. Chesterton and a spokesman of the Racial Preservation Society. The result of the meeting was the founding of the National Front in 1967.

=== NF and political retirement ===
Bean became something of a peripheral figure in the NF, as the BNP element was somewhat sidelined. He held the post of Deputy Chairman of the Executive Directorate, a body which was largely subordinate to the Policy Directorate, and stood as second candidate for the Ealing constituency in the 1967 Greater London Council elections until resigning in 1968. Still an NF member, he was recalled to positions of minor influence from time to time until 1972 when he largely ceased active involvement. Retreating into political retirement, his membership lapsed in 1977 and he emerged only briefly to lend some support to his old friend Andrew Fountaine's Constitutional Movement and to take part in the Countryside Alliance march of 1 March 1998.

During this period he wrote two books. Ten Miles From Anywhere (Hedgerow Publishing 1995), looked at the changes in a Suffolk village from the beginning of the 20th century. Many Shades of Black, (New Millennium 1999), was Bean's political memoires up to that date. He subsequently wrote a novel Blood in the Square which fictionalized some of his political experiences in the 1960s. In August 2016 his historical novel Trail of the Viking Finger was published by Troubador Publications.

=== Bean in the BNP and BDP ===
Bean eventually ended his retirement after the political fall of John Tyndall and joined the British National Party under the leadership of Nick Griffin. He became an active official of the BNP (mostly in administration) and was a candidate for the party in the 2004 European elections, where he was seventh on a list of seven candidates for the Scotland constituency. He formerly ran his own website, but then wrote a regular column for the main BNP website, and served as editor of BNP magazine Identity until March 2010.

Due to dissatisfaction with his leadership, Bean demanded that Griffin resign as National Chairman and focus more on the North West region.

In May 2011, Bean endorsed Andrew Brons (the BNP MEP for Yorkshire and the Humber). He made significant contributions to the Brons team web site, including articles on Genetics and Inheritance and Nationalism and a European Confederation. He subsequently became involved in Brons's party the British Democratic Party, established in February 2013.

== Personal life ==
Bean lived in North Yorkshire in later years. He died on 9 November 2021, at the age of 94. An obituary on the white nationalist website Counter-Currents stated that he was survived by his wife of 72 years, Marion, as well as his son and daughter.

== Elections contested ==
UK Parliament elections

Date of election	Constituency	Party	Votes	%
1964	Southall	BNP	3,410	9.1
1966	Southall	BNP	2,768	7.4

Greater London Council elections

Date of election	Constituency	Party	Votes	%
1967	Ealing	NF	2,164	1.9

European Parliament elections

Date of election	Region	Party	Votes	%	Results	Notes
2004	Scotland	BNP	19,427	1.7	Not elected	Multi-member constituencies; party list
