= 2011 British National Party leadership election =

- 25 July 2011
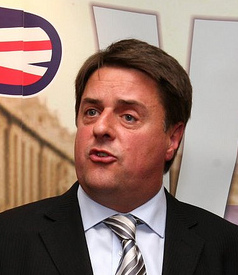

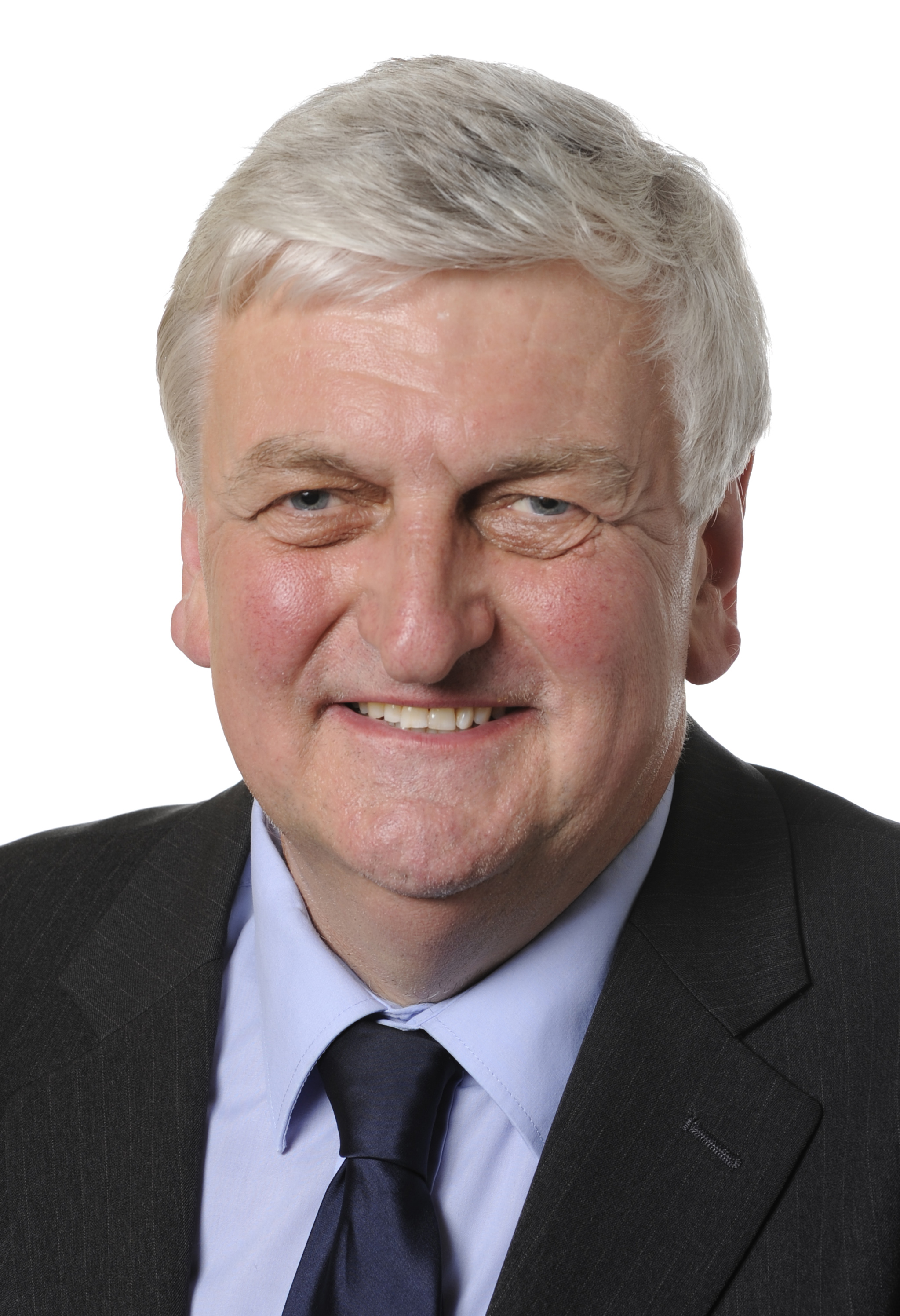
Candidate	Nick Griffin	Andrew Brons	Spoiled ballot
Popular vote	1,157	1,148	11
Percentage	49.9%	49.6%	0.5%
Leader before election
Nick Griffin
Elected Leader
Nick Griffin

The British National Party (BNP) leadership election of 2011 was triggered on 28 June 2011 when the party adopted a new constitution that required a leadership election to take place every four years. Two candidates stood in the leadership election: Nick Griffin (BNP leader since 1999, and MEP for North West England) and Andrew Brons (MEP for Yorkshire and the Humber). On 25 July 2011, the results of the leadership election were announced, with Griffin being named the winner by just 9 votes. Griffin had secured 1,157 votes compared to the 1,148 votes for Brons.

== Candidates ==
All candidates required support from 11 'voting members' in order to appear on the ballot. Two candidates were confirmed:

- Nick Griffin, MEP for North West England and current Chairman of the BNP.
- Andrew Brons, MEP for Yorkshire and the Humber, and former Chairman of the National Front.

Richard Edmonds had announced his hope to stand for the leadership, but stood down in favour of Brons.

== Results ==
The vote was split 49.8% to Brons and 50.2% to Griffin. There were 11 spoilt papers and 37 ballots were declared invalid as they contained no signature.

British National Party leadership election, 2011
Candidate	Votes	%
Nick Griffin	1,157	50.2
Andrew Brons	1,148	49.8
