= National Labour Party (UK, 1957) =

British far right political party

- Abbreviation: NLP
- Leader: John Bean
- President: Andrew Fountaine
- Founder: John Bean
- Founded: 1957
- Dissolved: 1960
- Preceded by: League of Empire Loyalists
- Succeeded by: British National Party
- Newspaper: Combat
- Ideology: Neo-Nazism; British nationalism
- Political position: Far-right

The National Labour Party (NLP) was a British neo-Nazi political party founded in 1957 by John Bean. The party campaigned on a platform of white nationalism, antisemitism, and opposition to non-white immigration.

== Formation ==
Bean had been a leading figure within the League of Empire Loyalists (LEL), although he had become disillusioned with its emphasis on publicity stunts and lack of political action. The problem came to a head in 1957 after A. K. Chesterton sent Bean and Phil Burbidge to the home of Malcolm Muggeridge in order to throw soot on the commentator after he criticised Queen Elizabeth II on a TV show. Although the action was not carried out, for Bean it was a prime example of the pointless and childish activism with which the LEL had become synonymous and he soon wrote to Chesterton, bemoaning the weak campaigning of the LEL, its refusal to contest elections, its attachment to a narrow British nationalism and its strong links to the Conservative Party.

Soon after, Bean left the LEL along with John Tyndall to set up the new party, deliberately picking the name to appeal to Labour supporters who were put off by immigration. The nominal party President was to be Andrew Fountaine, although Bean's role as policy director gave him effective control. Producing a journal named Combat, the NLP used its pages to campaign for a reduction in the sentences of those convicted over the 1958 Notting Hill race riots.

== Electoral activity ==
A very small party, the NLP secured some decent results in the London council election, although the Labour Party objected to the NLP's use of its name. At the time, however, ballot papers listed only the names of the candidates, not the names of the parties, so it was probably less likely than it would be today that Labour voters might vote for the NLP by mistake. Buoyed by its minor success, the party organised a Stop the Coloured Invasion rally in Trafalgar Square with banners displayed proclaiming Keep Britain White in May 1959 which drew a crowd of 3,000 to hear speeches by Bean, Fountaine and White Defence League leader Colin Jordan. The monitors at the rally wore white armbands emblazoned with a black sun.

The party was even briefly linked to the London gangster Albert Dimes, who hoped to use NLP members against his rival, Jack Como (alias Jack Spot), a Jewish gangster who was involved in funding the 43 Group, an anti-fascist group set up by Jewish ex-servicemen. Other 43 Group funders included the boxing promoter Jack Solomons, the businessman Sir Charles Clore and Bud Flanagan, the music hall entertainer, who sent a £30 cheque every month.

The party stood a single candidate in the 1959 general election with former boxer Bill Webster running in St Pancras North. The decision to run a candidate was largely driven by the realities of racial tension in the area, as exposed by the previous year's riots. During the campaign, a number of NLP supporters attacked a meeting at the local Town Hall where Kenneth Robinson was a featured speaker. A number of arrests were made over the incident, which made national news and thus served to publicise the name of the NLP. In the election, the party received 4.1% of the vote in St Pancras North, and lost its deposit.

== Election results ==
=== House of Commons ===
Election year	# of total votes	% of overall vote	# of seats won	Rank
1959	▲1,685	▲0.00%	0	14

== Decline ==
The aftermath of the event, however, was the decline of the NLP. Bean served 30 days in jail for his part in the riot and whilst he was incarcerated Webster left to join the Union Movement and Tyndall also resigned from the party. With the NLP demoralised and closer links to Colin Jordan having been developed, the party merged with the White Defence League on 24 February 1960. Although the name Racial Nationalist Party was initially considered it was ultimately decided to name the new entity the British National Party.

== Return of the name ==
In 1981, National Front activist John King, the candidate for Rochester and Chatham in the 1979 election, broke from that group and formed his own minor party also using the name National Labour Party. This version, which was not connected to Bean's, took a Powellite line on immigration although it was significantly less economically neo-liberal than Powell. This group contested two elections, the 1983 Bermondsey by-election and the Ashford constituency in the 1983 general election, without making any impact.

== Bibliography ==
- J. Bean, Many Shades of Black – Inside Britain’s Far Right, London: New Millennium, 1999
- S. Taylor, The National Front in English Politics, London: Macmillan, 1982
- M. Walker, The National Front, Glasgow: Fontana Collins, 1977
