= Colin Jordan =

British neo-Nazi activist (1923–2009)

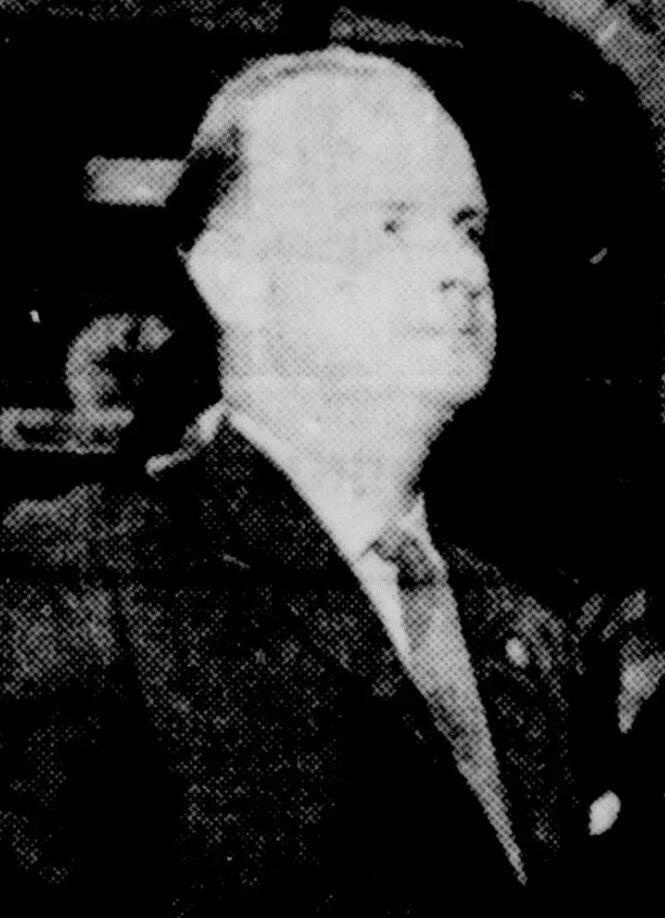
- Jordan in August 1962

Leader of the British Movement
- In office 1962–1975
- Preceded by: Position established
- Succeeded by: Michael McLaughlin

Personal details
- Born: John Colin Campbell Jordan; 19 June 1923 Birmingham, England
- Died: 9 April 2009 (aged 85) Pateley Bridge, North Yorkshire, England
- Party: British Peoples Party; White Defence League; British Movement; British National Party; National Socialist Movement
- Spouse: Françoise Dior (m. 1963; div. 1967)
- Domestic partner(s): Julianna Safrany (?? – his death)
- Education: Sidney Sussex College, Cambridge
- Occupation: Teacher, politician, activist, writer

John Colin Campbell Jordan (19 June 1923 – 9 April 2009) was a British politician and a leading figure in post-war neo-Nazism in the UK. In the far-right circles of the 1960s, Jordan represented the most explicitly Nazi inclination in his open use of the styles and symbols of Nazi Germany. Through his leadership of organisations such as the National Socialist Movement and the World Union of National Socialists, Jordan advocated a pan-Aryan "Universal Nazism". Although later unaffiliated with any political party, Jordan remained an influential voice on the British far right.

== Early life ==
John Colin Campbell Jordan was born in Birmingham on 19 June 1923. The son of a lecturer, Percy Jordan, and a teacher, Bertha Jordan, Jordan was educated at Warwick School from 1934 to 1942. During the Second World War he attempted to enlist in the Fleet Air Arm and the RAF, but, after failing the tests for both, he enlisted in the Royal Army Educational Corps. After being demobilised in 1946 he studied at Sidney Sussex College, Cambridge, graduating in 1949 with second class honours in history. That same year he became a teacher at Stoke Secondary Modern Boys School, Coventry, where he taught mathematics. In 1953, he received his M.A. He joined the League of Empire Loyalists and became its Midlands organiser.

At Cambridge Jordan formed a Nationalist Club. Jordan soon became associated with Arnold Leese and was left the use of a house in Leese's will. This became the Notting Hill base of operations when Jordan launched the White Defence League in 1956. Jordan later merged this party with the National Labour Party to form the British National Party in 1960, although he split from it after a quarrel with John Bean, who was opposed to Jordan's advocacy of Nazism.

== Leading activist ==
In 1962, Jordan founded the National Socialist Movement (renamed the British Movement in 1968) with John Tyndall as its leader. A meeting in Trafalgar Square on 2 July 1962 of supporters was disrupted by opponents, whom Jordan described as being "Jews and Communists", leading to a riot. He was dismissed by the board of governors of the Coventry school where he taught in August 1962 after a period of suspension that had begun after the events in Trafalgar Square.

In August 1962 Jordan hosted an international conference of Nazis at Guiting Power in Gloucestershire, which resulted in the formation of the World Union of National Socialists. Jordan was the commander of its European section throughout the 1960s and was also elected "World Führer" with George Lincoln Rockwell, founder of the American Nazi Party, as his deputy. On 16 August Jordan and Tyndall, together with Martin Webster, Denis Pirie and Roland Kerr-Ritchie, were charged under the Public Order Act 1936 with attempting to set up a paramilitary force called the Spearhead, which was modelled on the SA of Nazi Germany. Undercover police observed Jordan leading the group in military manoeuvres. He was sentenced to nine months' imprisonment in October 1962.

On 5 October 1963, while John Tyndall was still in prison, Jordan, who had just been released, married Tyndall's fiancée, Françoise Dior, the former wife of a French nobleman and the niece of the French fashion designer Christian Dior. This hasty marriage was ostensibly to prevent her deportation as an undesirable alien. When Tyndall was eventually released, the marriage caused friction, and he split with Jordan in 1964 to form the Greater Britain Movement. Jordan's marriage to Dior proved short-lived, though, and she announced the couple's separation in January 1964. She claimed that Jordan had become "bourgeois". The couple nevertheless remained married until their divorce in 1967.

During the Leyton by-election of 1965 Jordan led a group of about 100 fascist demonstrators at a public Labour Party meeting, and after taking to the stage to berate the audience he was punched by Denis Healey, the then Secretary of State for Defence. The fracas came about because the far right was using the by-election to stir up interracial hatred in order to defeat the Labour candidate (and Foreign Secretary) Patrick Gordon Walker. He had previously been defeated in the 1964 general election in the Smethwick constituency after racist campaigning tactics were employed by Colin Jordan and his followers. Specifically, Jordan claimed that his group produced the much publicised "If you want a nigger for a neighbour, vote Liberal or Labour" slogan and launched the campaign to circulate the posters and stickers which the slogan was written on; in the past Jordan's group had also written and circulated other campaign slogans, such as: "Don't vote – a vote for Tory, Labour or Liberal is a vote for more Blacks!". The successful Conservative candidate was Peter Griffiths, who did little to condemn the campaign. On 25 January 1967, Jordan was sentenced to eighteen months in prison at Devon Assizes in Exeter for breaking the Race Relations Act 1965 by circulating material that was likely to cause racial hatred. At the same time, Jordan was prosecuted and convicted under the Public Order Act 1936 for distributing a leaflet titled "The Coloured Invasion", "a vituperative attack on black and Asian people".

In September 1972, Jordan was fined for disorderly behaviour at Heathrow Airport when, after protesting against the arrival of Ugandan Asians into Britain, he addressed airport staff through a loudspeaker, urging them to strike in protest against mass immigration from Uganda.

Jordan reorganised the National Socialist Movement as the British Movement in 1968, but in 1974 he was obliged to step down from its leadership in favour of Michael McLaughlin. His demise was further accelerated by his arrest and subsequent conviction for shoplifting three pairs of women's red knickers from Tesco's Leamington Spa branch in June 1975. Magistrates fined him £50 for the offence.

While leader of the British Movement, Jordan stood for parliament on three occasions: in the 1969 Birmingham Ladywood by-election (282 votes, 3.0%); Birmingham Aston in the 1970 general election (704 votes, 2.5%) and Wolverhampton North East in the February 1974 general election (711 votes, 1.5%).

== Later life ==
Jordan maintained ties to groups led by Eddy Morrison and Kevin Watmough, such as the White Nationalist Party and the British People's Party as well as the American National Socialist Workers Party. In 2000, he expressed scepticism over the efforts of the British National Party to soften its hard right stance.

In the 1980s, Jordan revived Gothic Ripples, originally Leese's publication, as his personal political project. He once declared that there was "no reliable evidence whatsoever" that six million Jews had been murdered in the Holocaust. In 1989, he stated his belief that Jesus was "counterfeit" and Adolf Hitler was the real "messiah" and "saviour", whose eventual "resurrection" would make him "the spiritual conqueror of the future".

Jordan was back in court in 2001, after being charged with publishing racist literature, but the judge ruled that his serious heart condition made him unfit to stand trial. He dedicated his 2004 book The Uprising to the jailed white supremacists Richard Scutari and David Lane. Jordan and Julianne Safrany became life partners at some point after his divorce from Dior. The two were still together when Jordan died at his Pateley Bridge home on 9 April 2009.

== Works ==
- Gothic Ripples Newsletter
- Fraudulent Conversion: The Myth of Moscow’s Change (1955)
- The Coloured Invasion (1967)
- Merrie England— 2,000 (1993)
- National Socialism: Vanguard of the Future: Selected Writings of Colin Jordan (1993, ISBN 87-87063-40-9)
- The Uprising (2004)
