= British National Party (1960) =

British far-right political party

- Abbreviation: BNP
- Leader: John Bean
- President: Andrew Fountaine
- Founders: John Bean; Colin Jordan
- Founded: 1960
- Dissolved: 1967
- Preceded by: National Labour Party; White Defence League
- Succeeded by: National Front
- Headquarters: Arnold Leese House, Notting Hill, London
- Newspaper: Combat
- Youth wing: National Youth Movement
- Ideology: British nationalism; White nationalism; Until 1962: Neo-Nazism; Antisemitism; From 1962: Anti-immigration
- Political position: Far-right
- Slogan: "For Race and Nation"

The British National Party (BNP) was a neo-Nazi political party in the United Kingdom. It was led by John Bean. The group, which was subject to internal divisions during its brief history, established some areas of local support before helping to form the National Front in 1967. Scholar Nigel Fielding described the BNP as having a "firmly Nazi" ideology.

== Formation ==
The party was formed in 1960 by the merger of the National Labour Party and the White Defence League (WDL), two political splinter groups from the League of Empire Loyalists pressure group. Both groups had been active in Notting Hill and had been co-operating closely there since the previous year when a merger was agreed. The new group, which was based at Arnold Leese House in Notting Hill (the former home of the Imperial Fascist League leader, used by WDL leader Colin Jordan as his base of operations), adopted the motto "For Race and Nation" and pledged to oppose the "international Jewish-controlled money-lending system" in its founding policy statement. Indeed, so strong was BNP antisemitism that the party advocated the immediate deportation of all Britain's Jews to either Israel or Madagascar, recalling the Madagascar Plan that was briefly considered by Nazi Germany. It also demanded an end to immigration, repatriation of immigrants, and the impeachment of the Conservative government for what the BNP felt to be their complicity in allowing uncontrolled immigration.

The party was led by John Bean, with Andrew Fountaine holding the position of Party President, and other leading members including John Tyndall, Colin Jordan (who served as Activities Organiser), Denis Pirie and Ted Budden. Leese's widow, who had given Jordan access to her home during his time as WDL leader, served as vice-president of the party.

== Activities ==
The party's early activities were hamstrung by a lack of money, and so it was restricted to the sort of headline-grabbing that had been the stock-in-trade of the WDL. These included demonstrating at railway stations where immigrant-carrying trains were arriving, holding a counter-demonstration to one organised by the Anti-Apartheid Movement, and holding a rally to oppose the Lord Mayor's Show because the presiding Lord Mayor of London, Bernard Waley-Cohen, was Jewish. Even so, the BNP managed to secure an 8.1% share of the vote in Deptford in the 1960 London County Council (LCC) election, a large result for a new party without name recognition. A National Youth Movement was also organised; this was sponsored by General Sir Richard Hilton, who was leader of his own Patriotic Party. Although rumours circulated at the time that German neo-Nazi groups were funding the BNP, there is no evidence to support this; it seems likely that the party was supported by a mixture of collections held in Trafalgar Square and funds from Fountaine who was personally well-off.

Elements within the party also expressed support for Nazism, and a paramilitary arm, Spearhead, was set up by Tyndall. Spearhead had initially been set up as group aimed at establishing the BNP outside London although its very youthful membership soon lent it a more violent character. Colin Jordan, who would later become a fierce critic of Tyndall would later suggest that Spearhead was set up as much to get Tyndall out of the way as anything else. The party also hosted a summer camp on Fountaine's land and this grew into an international event, beginning in 1961 when delegates attended from the National States' Rights Party and the Nordic Reich Party among others. In early 1962 Oswald Mosley had approached both Jordan and Bean and had offered them positions as national organisers within his group, which would subsume the BNP. However the plan was rejected as neither man had faith in Mosley while the two were increasingly on a collision course within the BNP itself.

== Election results ==
=== House of Commons ===
Election year	# of total votes	% of overall vote	# of seats won	Rank
1964	▲3,410	▲0.00%	0	12
1966	▲5,182	▲0.00%	0	12

== Split ==
The BNP quickly began to break down into arguments and in-fighting began as Bean believed that the open Nazism of Jordan and Tyndall (who had stated that "Hitler was right") was proving damaging to the Party's image and chances of success. Bean had first raised the issue in 1961 when he almost unseated Jordan from his role as national organiser and in February 1962 he presented a resolution condemning Jordan's open Nazism at a meeting of the national council. The resolution was passed 7 votes to 5 and, after a struggle, the party split with around 80% of the membership backing Bean and the rest, including Tyndall and Pirie, leaving with Jordan to join a new National Socialist Movement. The remaining BNP came under effective control of John Bean, who had previously been limited in his control by the presence of Jordan, as a result of the split.

== Opposition ==
The departure of Jordan and the subsequent arrest of the leaders of the NSM brought a lot of public attention to the far-right in general and the BNP's 1962 summer camp, where a Falangist and an Organisation armée secrète leader were among the guests, was surrounded by press photographers despite Fountaine telling them that it was merely a "holiday camp". Meanwhile, the BNP, along with the Union Movement and other extremist groups, faced increasing opposition from the Jewish "Yellow Star Movement", which had itself become increasingly radicalised with a group of 40 BNP members attacked and beaten up on 2 September 1962 in London.

== Bean's BNP ==
Under the sole control of Bean the party, like most of its contemporaries on the far right, had a severe shortage of money and as early as 1963 an issue of the party journal Combat spoke of possible doom for the BNP if new sources of money were not found. However against this backdrop a new area of local support opened up for the BNP.

Following changes in the local demographics a group of whites set up a Southall Residents Association which, while not specifically anti-immigration, wanted the immigrants already in the area to integrate while stopping further migrants from settling locally. Although this was the official policy some members, notably chairman Arthur Cooney and treasurer Doris Hart, wanted stronger opposition and in the 1963 local elections they nominated two BNP candidates to stand in the Glebe and Hambrough wards. Although neither was elected their votes were respectable, 13.5% in Glebe and 27.5% in Hambrough where the Labour Party lost a normally safe seat to the Conservative Party after a swing from Labour to BNP. Bean saw the potential in this sort of local issue as a springboard to finally building the sort of mass party that he desired and as such he stood as a candidate in Southall in the 1964 general election. Adopting a platform based on ending all "coloured" immigration and offering National Assistance only to immigrants who agreed to accept repatriation Bean secured 9% of the vote, which was at that point the highest ever won by a candidate running on an avowedly racialist ticket. With a "Stop Immigration Now" campaign the party finally enjoyed some comparative success.

However within the political mainstream the major parties began to turn away from the immigration issue and this mood was reflected by the electorate in the 1966 general election with vocal anti-immigration politicians either suffering reduced majorities, as happened to Enoch Powell, or the loss of seats, like Peter Griffiths. This shift in attitudes impacted upon the BNP with Bean's personal vote in Southall falling to 7.4%, a candidate in Deptford winning 7% and a candidate in Smethwick, where much local work had been undertaken by the party, managing only 1.5%.

Under Bean the BNP grew to become the largest political party on the far right and the only one with a comparatively good track record in electoral politics yet its ambitions were consistently hamstrung by a terminal lack of money and increasingly it looked like the future for the BNP lay in working much more closely with other groups.

== The National Front ==
With a new spirit of unity prevalent on the far right, John Tyndall approached the BNP in early 1966 with a request that it should merge with his Greater Britain Movement and the Racial Preservation Society. However Ron Cuddon, a member of the BNP Council and staunch opponent of Tyndall, vetoed the request while it was also rejected by the RPS. In September that same year however the BNP agreed with leading RPS member Dr David Brown that they would seek to unify as the National Democratic Party. Within a week however this plan had been abandoned both due to Bean still wanting to find an accommodation with the GBM and his reluctance to serve under Brown, who insisted on full leadership of the new party for himself.

Sensing that his own presence was putting Chesterton off, due to his own neo-Nazi background, Bean resigned from the BNP Council in September 1966 with his place being taken by Philip Maxwell, who was close to Chesterton. As a result, merger negotiations that began with the LEL soon afterwards were not attended by Bean but rather saw Maxwell and Fountaine present the BNP's case. Maxwell addressed the LEL conference in October 1966 by which time merger discussions were so far advanced that the names National Independence Party and British Front were already being considered for the new group. At the conference a working party was established to finalise details of the new group, consisting of Philip Maxwell, Bernard Simmons and Gerald Kemp from the BNP and Austen Brooks, Rosine de Bounevialle, Avril Walters and Nettie Bonner representing the LEL. On 7 February 1967 the BNP officially went out of existence as the new movement, by now officially known as the National Front, was declared in existence.
