= League of Empire Loyalists =

Defunct British far-right pressure group

- Abbreviation: LEL
- Leader: A. K. Chesterton
- Founded: 1954; 72 years ago
- Dissolved: 7 February 1967; 59 years ago
- Split from: Conservative Party
- Merged into: National Front
- Membership: 2,000–3,000 (1960s est.)
- Ideology: British imperialism; National conservatism; Social conservatism; Anti-communism; Antisemitism; White nationalism
- Political position: Far-right
- Colours: Red White Blue

The League of Empire Loyalists (LEL) was a British pressure group (also called a "ginger group" in Britain and the Commonwealth of Nations), established in 1954. Its ostensible purpose was for the continuation and preservation of the British Empire. The League was a small group of former members of the Conservative Party led by A. K. Chesterton, a former leading figure in the British Union of Fascists, who had served under Sir Oswald Mosley. The League found support from some Conservative Party members, although most of the Conservative leadership disliked it.

== Formation ==
Chesterton established the group in 1954 on the far right of the Conservative Party, effectively as a reaction to the more liberal forms of Toryism in evidence at the time, as typified by the policies of R. A. Butler. Chesterton feared the growth of the Soviet Union and of the United States. He concluded that Bolshevism and American-style capitalism were actually in an alliance as part of a Jewish-led conspiracy against the British Empire, a mindset that informed the LEL from the beginning.

The wide-reaching critiques that this conspiracy theory utilised meant that the LEL won membership from various sectors of right-wing opinion, including former BUF activists like Chesterton himself and Barry Domvile, traditionalist patriots like General Richard Hilton and young radicals like John Tyndall, John Bean, Colin Jordan and Martin Webster. Indeed, in its early years, the LEL succeeded in attracting some leading members of the establishment to its ranks, including Field-Marshal Edmund Ironside, 1st Baron Ironside, Lieutenant-General Sir Balfour Oliphant Hutchison and the former British People's Party election candidate Air Commodore G. S. Oddie.

Although the LEL actively supported an independent candidate who was a member at the 1957 Lewisham North by-election, it was not a political party. According to Nigel Fielding, the LEL "was composed of right-wing Conservatives, particularly retired military men, and a few pre-war Fascists".

== Stunts ==
The LEL was well known for various stunts at Conservative Party meetings and conferences (acting as a constant irritant to the party). These stunts included hiding underneath the speaker platform overnight to emerge during the conference in order to put across their points. At the 1958 party Conference in Blackpool, George Irvine Finlay (who became Director of Organisation for the Scottish Conservatives) was involved in forcibly removing members of the League of Empire Loyalists. The widespread media coverage resulted in his being sued for assault; not only was he acquitted, but costs were awarded against the prosecution. That same year the League secured further publicity when members launched an "invasion" of the Lambeth Conference of the Anglican Communion.

In another incident, LEL member Austen Brooks gained access to a lunch for U Thant by impersonating Cypriot Archbishop Makarios III, both men being heavily bearded, before revealing his charade and shouting LEL slogans. Sir Anthony Eden was also a target and when he shook hands with Nikita Khrushchev and Nikolai Bulganin as they arrived at Victoria Station in 1956, LEL members were on hand to yell at Eden that he had just shaken hands with murderers. In November 1961, Leonard Young, a Royal Air Force Wing Commander and author of the 1956 book Deadlier Than the H-Bomb, gained further notoriety for the LEL when he threw a bag of sheep guts at the President of Kenya, Jomo Kenyatta. The Campaign for Nuclear Disarmament was also a target when speakers at its inaugural rally in Central Hall, Westminster, on 17 February 1958 were heckled, in particular Michael Foot. After these antics, the Tory leadership made it clear to their members that the LEL was to be discouraged, leading to a severe downturn in membership.

== Policies ==
As its name suggests, the initial aim of the LEL was to support the British Empire and to campaign for its continuing existence. It was to be its calls for the restoration of the empire and reassertion of the notion of Britons as the world's natural leaders that ultimately saw the group become estranged from the Conservatives, as the League was increasingly divorced from the one nation conservatism that came to dominate the party. This was particularly true following the independence of Sudan and the Suez Crisis in 1956 when the Conservatives formally broke from any notion of being the party of empire.

As time progressed, the group became primarily concerned with opposing non-white immigration into Britain and were instrumental in the founding (with other right-wing and neo-Nazi groups) of the National Front in February 1967. Chesterton's personal anti-Semitism and devotion to conspiracy theories about the Jews and international capitalism also became more prominent in LEL ideology towards the end of the group's life. The League was also strongly anti-communist and had close links with emigre groups such as the Ukrainian National Committee.

== Decline and splits ==
By 1961, the LEL found itself in financial trouble, and Chesterton was funding the group himself. The group had also lost many of its members, falling from a 1958 high of 3000 to only 300 members. Some had left with Hilton to join his Patriotic Party whilst another group of leavers had been the supporters of Colin Jordan. Jordan had left in 1957 after his call to bar Jews, and non-whites from the LEL had been rejected, whilst John Bean had left under acrimonious circumstances the following year. Both men advocated the formation of mass parties, an idea that Chesterton rejected, and over time they won support to their respective groups, the White Defence League and the National Labour Party by advocating these and other more radical ideas.

By the mid-1960s, the LEL was a shadow of its former self as, according to leading member Rodney Legg, it had come to be seen as archaic and anachronistic whilst it was struggling even more with a lack of funds. By 1964, Chesterton was already being heard to say in private that the future of the LEL might be better served by joining up with the younger, more radical members who had departed earlier in the decade. In an attempt to reinvigorate the flagging group Chesterton was persuaded to put up three "Independent Loyalist" candidates in the 1964 General Election, but between them, they managed to secure only 1064 votes According to Michael Billig, the League only contested these seats as a publicity stunt rather than due to having any pretensions to becoming a political party. The League's journal Candour went on to support the National Front while A. K. Chesterton was its leader. Following that, it became independent and is still published to this day.

== Creation of the National Front ==
Despite the poor performances of the three candidates, donations had poured in from all over the country to help them fight the campaign. This made a deep impression on Chesterton, who had largely been obliged to fund the LEL out of his own pocket. Chesterton had been preoccupied with a legal case over the estate of his financial benefactor, the Chile-based millionaire Robert K. Jeffrey, who had seemingly left two contradictory wills, but Chesterton's fervour for politics had been rekindled by his discovery of the relative ease of funding a political party and by the emergence of Edward Martell, a right-wing libertarian who had garnered a reputation as an excellent fund-raiser and whose methods, if not politics, had impressed Chesterton greatly. By the spring of 1966, Chesterton had begun sounding out the likes of Bean, Tyndall and even Jordan about the possibility of building a united front on the far right.

Chesterton's mood was dampened somewhat by the 1966 general election in which the Labour Party won a convincing victory and anti-immigration candidates lost support, as well as by Rhodesia's exit from the Commonwealth following its Unilateral Declaration of Independence. However, it also convinced him that space had opened to the right of the Conservative Party and that the chances were better for a united far-right group. The LEL, however, was under threat from the growth of the Racial Preservation Society and of the Monday Club, making the need for a new party that much more urgent. Around this time, he flirted with Dr David Brown of the Racial Preservation Society and his plans to establish a National Democratic Party, but he backed away when Brown insisted that the LEL would effectively be turned over to RPS control in this arrangement.

Discussions with the British National Party (BNP) began in earnest in September 1966, and by the time of the LEL conference the following month, plans were already at such an advanced stage that the major topic was whether the new party would be called the British Front or the National Independence Party. The conference also saw the establishment of a working party to thrash out details of the new group, consisting of Austen Brooks, Rosine de Bounevialle, Avril Walters and Nettie Bonner from the LEL and Philip Maxwell, Bernard Simmons and Gerald Kemp from the BNP. On 7 February 1967 the LEL was wound up and replaced by the newly merged group, by now known as the National Front.
