= Denis Pirie =

British far-right politician (1939–2025)

Denis Alex Pirie (1939 – 18 January 2025) was a veteran of the British far right scene who took a leading role in a number of movements.

== Life and career ==
Pirie was born in Lambeth, London, England in 1939. He began his career as a member of the 1960s British National Party and was appointed a member of the party's national council not long after its foundation. He soon became associated with the more openly Nazi wing under Colin Jordan and took an active role in his and John Tyndall's attempts to set up a paramilitary wing, Spearhead. Pirie was arrested at one of their drills in 1961 and was sentenced to three months imprisonment for his role. After the court passed sentence Pirie gave a Roman salute to the court.

After his release from prison Pirie followed Jordan and Tyndall into the National Socialist Movement in 1962. Whilst here, he joined Tyndall in attempting to procure funds from Egypt for the NSM, although nothing came of this. During the quarrel between Jordan and Tyndall, Pirie largely sided with Tyndall and so followed him into the Greater Britain Movement in 1964. Pirie joined the National Front at the same time as the rest of the GBM and continued to feature prominently, gaining a seat on the NF Directorate. Pirie was dismissed from the Directorate in 1973 after it came to light that he attended celebrations for Hitler's birthday, although he had regained his place by the following year.

Around this time, Pirie enrolled as a mature student at the University of Sussex and soon became friendly with Richard Lawson, a young activist in the NF. Pirie's political outlook changed and he abandoned the neo-Nazism which had previously defined his politics, adopting a Strasserite outlook and becoming associated with this faction. Grouped around The Beacon, a party newspaper, the Strasserites initially represented an independent faction within the NF but soon became associated with the populists of John Kingsley Read in his struggle against Tyndall. As a result, Pirie became a founder member of the National Party and took a leading role in this group during its fairly brief existence. Following its collapse he became involved with the League of Saint George for a time.

When the National Party foundered, Pirie left active politics until the mid-1980s when he collaborated with Martin Webster in organising Our Nation. Initially taking a leading role in the group, Pirie's involvement was curtailed when the press leaked the story of his membership of the group while working in a potentially sensitive role as a civil servant in Whitehall. With Our Nation holding only a few meetings and Pirie's involvement compromised by the press leak, he retired from active politics after this incident.

Pirie died at his home in Brighton, on 18 January 2025, at the age of 85.

== Bibliography ==
- Death by Dior: Françoise Dior, by Terry Cooper (Dynasty Press, 2013, ISBN 978-0-9568038-6-3)
