= National Democratic Party (UK, 1966) =

British right wing political party

The National Democratic Party (NDP) was a right wing political party that operated in the United Kingdom during the 1960s and 1970s. The NDP sought to position itself as an early rival to the National Front although ultimately it failed to challenge the position of this group.

== Background ==
The NDP had existed on paper since the early 1960s as the title was used by Dr David Brown in both the 1964 and 1966 general elections to contest the Ipswich constituency, securing 0.6% and 1.3% of the vote in the respective elections. However this NDP had no existence beyond Brown and it was not until 1966 that a process of formalisation as a proper political party took place.

== Formation ==
In 1966, Brown, who was also the chairman of the Racial Preservation Society, proposed to form the NDP by merging the RPS with John Bean's British National Party. However this did not occur as Bean was put off by Brown insisting that the Greater Britain Movement should be excluded from any alliance and that Brown should be sole leader of the new party. Following this Brown entered negotiations with A.K. Chesterton about using the League of Empire Loyalists as the basis for the NDP but this plan was rejected by Chesterton as once again Brown insisted that leadership should lie with him alone. The National Front, effectively a merger between the BNP, LEL and elements of the RPS under Robin Beauclaire followed soon afterwards, with Brown excluded.

Despite this set back the NDP was established officially in 1966 before the NF although critics, particularly from within the NF, argued that Brown only did so as he could not stand the prospect of serving under A. K. Chesterton. Amongst the leading members of the party upon formation was Leslie Eric 'Lutz' Vaughan who had been associated with the National Socialist Movement's Spearhead paramilitary wing and Column 88.

== 1970 election ==
In its early years, the Party expanded through mergers with a number of smaller movements, including the British Defence League, a small group based around ex-Conservative John O'Brien. Another group to join was the Association of British People, a 200 strong group from Birmingham that opted for the NDP after turning down the overtures of the National Front's Martin Webster. This group took the lead in the campaign in the Birmingham Stechford seat where the party won 3.% of the vote in the 1970 general election. In the same election the NDP had managed the largest vote share of any far-right group competing in Southampton Itchen, where it won 21.8% of the votes. Southampton was the seat of the Speaker of the House of Commons however, and traditionally, re-election of the Speaker is unopposed by other major parties. Dr. Brown, meanwhile, won an improved 3.7% vote share in Ipswich, a seat he continued to contest until his final election in February 1974. With only 2.5% of the vote secured for its candidate in Leicester North West, and although the party had attracted some disaffected Conservatives who supported Enoch Powell, there was a general feeling within the NDP that the election had been disappointing for them.

== Relationship with NF ==
O'Brien had already left the NDP to join the NF before the election, although he maintained close links with (Anthony) AFX Baron, whose East Anglia Forum was affiliated to the NDP. Chesterton had long hoped to merge the NF with the NDP, a party that he believed contained less of a loutish element than his own NF, and he felt that O'Brien's appointment as NF chairman would hasten this aim due to O'Brien's good standing with NDP activists.

The party had held informal discussions with the NF about a merger in early 1970, although these came to nothing as the NF fell into upheaval resulting in the removal of Chesterton from the leadership. The issue came back on the agenda with O'Brien as NF leader and certainly the two groups grew closer and the NDP was persuaded to withdraw its proposed candidate from the St Marylebone by-election in 1970 and instead campaign on behalf of the NF's Malcolm Skeggs. A merger was discussed and O'Brien presented such a proposal to the NF Directorate but they refused to endorse the idea. Nonetheless the two groups were able to continue with a closer working relationship and in 1971 leading NDP member Eddie Bray even brought a coachload of party members to Bristol where they joined an NF march in the city. The relationship was not always beneficial, however, such as when the important Manchester branch left en bloc, under the direction of organiser Walter Barton, to join the NF after a particularly rousing speech by O'Brien.

In May 1971 Eddie Bray stood as a candidate in the Southampton Itchen by-election. In the seat where the party had performed well in the previous general election the NDP once again made a good showing with Bray winning over 7.5% of the vote and finishing ahead of the Liberal Party candidate.

== Final years ==
The NDP was weakened when O'Brien left the NF and joined the National Independence Party rather than bringing his followers back to the NDP. O'Brien left the NF because of John Tyndall and Martin Webster's neo-Nazi links The party tried to carry on but it became less and less significant. The emergence of other outlets for the populist tendency of the far right, such as the National Party, meant that support for the NDP disappeared. Towards the end of its life the NDP attempted to forge links with rightist groups associated with the Conservative Party such as the Conservative Monday Club and the Anglo-Rhodesia Society, although the party was gone by the late 1970s. Around this time future Tory MP Piers Merchant was a member of the party.

The NDP was not connected to the National Democrats, which was an attempt by the NF to change its name. This resulted in a split in the NF.

== Election results ==
=== House of Commons ===
Election year	# of total votes	% of overall vote	# of seats won	Rank
1964	▲349	▲0.00%	0	23
1966	▲769	▲0.00%	0	17
1970	▲14,276	▲0.01%	0	14
1974	▼1,161	▼0.00%	0	30
