= List of people from Berkhamsted =

During its long history many notable people are, or have been associated with Berkhamsted, a town in Dacorum, Hertfordshire, England.

== Academic and Medical ==
- Henry Atkins (1554/5–1635), President of the College of Physicians, 1606–1635
- George Field (1777?–1854), chemist
- George William Lefevre M.D. (1798–1846), English physician and travel writer.
- Christopher Edmund Broome (24 July 1812 – 15 November 1886), mycologist
- John Evans (17 November 1823 – 31 May 1908), archaeologist and geologist
- Alfred Merle Norman (1831–1918), clergyman and naturalist
- Raymond Greene (1901–1982), endocrinologist and mountaineer (brother of Graham Greene).
- Ian Bradley (28 May 1950–), academic, author, theologian, Church of Scotland minister, journalist and broadcaster.

Moved to Berkhamsted

- G. M. Trevelyan (1876–1962), noted British historian, as a resident he took part in historical pageants in the town.

== Artists and Writers ==
- Poet and hymn writer William Cowper (1731–1800), one of the most popular poets of his time, Cowper changed the direction of eighteenth century nature poetry by writing of everyday life and scenes of the English countryside.
- Novelist Graham Greene (1904–1991), whose father was headmaster of Berkhamsted School, which Greene attended. One of Greene's novels, The Human Factor, set there and mentions several places in the town, including Kings Road and Berkhamsted Common. In his autobiography, Greene wrote that he has been 'moulded in a special way through Berkhamsted'. Greene's life and works are celebrated annually during the last weekend in September with a festival organised by the Graham Greene Birthplace Trust.
- Richard Mabey (20 February 1941–), writer and broadcaster, chiefly on the relations between nature and culture
- Jonathan Carr (1942–2008), journalist and author
- Antony Hopkins (21 March 1921 – 6 May 2014), English composer, pianist and conductor, as well as a writer and radio broadcaster.
- Stanley Wilson (1899-1953), composer and music teacher, born in Berkhamsted and educated at Berkhamsted School.

Moved to Berkhamsted

- Kingsley Amis (1922-1995), English novelist, whose parents moved to Berkhamsted in 1940.
- Maria Edgeworth (1 January 1768 – 22 May 1849), prolific Anglo-Irish writer, adult and realistic children's literature and was a significant figure in the evolution of the novel in Europe, lived at Edgeworth House in Berkhamsted as a child.
- H. E. Todd (1908–1988) British writer of children's fiction, married and died in Berkhamsted.
- Hilda van Stockum (9 February 1908 – 1 November 2006), Dutch born children's author and artist, also died in Berkhamsted.
- Reg Butler (1913–1981), sculptor.
- Matt Whyman (1969–), novelist and advice columnist

== Local Historians ==
- Percy Birtchnell (1910–1986), local historian. His publications include "A History of Berkhamsted" and "Bygone Berkhamsted" both published by Clunberry.

Moved to Berkhamsted

- Scott Hastie, poet and local historian

== Media, Actors and Singers ==
- Sir Hugh Greene (1910–1987), Director-General of the BBC from 1960 to 1969 (brother of Graham Greene)
- Michael Hordern (1911–1995), actor, born in The Poplars, an eighteenth-century townhouse on the high street
- Esther Rantzen (1940–2026), television presenter
- Valerie Van Ost (25 July 1944–), actress
- Television presenter Nick Owen (1947–)
- Singer Sarah Brightman (1960–)
- Simon Minter (7 September 1992–), YouTube personality known as Miniminter
- Roman Kemp (28 January 1993–), radio host, TV personality
- Olajide Olatunji (19 June 1993–), YouTube personality, boxer, rapper, singer and songwriter known as KSI

Moved to Berkhamsted

- Harry Worth (1917 in Yorkshire −1989), comedian, lived and died in Berkhamsted
- John Cleese, comic actor has lived in Berkhamsted.
- Timothy Bentinck, actor and 12th Earl of Portland, grew up in Berkhamsted
- Geoffrey Palmer, actor
- Adrian Scarborough, actor
- Peter Drury, sports commentator
- Pete Donaldson, podcaster / voice artist

== Military ==
- Colonel Daniel Axtell (1622 – 19 October 1660) grocery apprentice, baptist and soldier who rose through the ranks to play a prominent part in the English Civil War; who after the English Restoration in 1660, was one of nine found guilty of regicide for taking part in the trial of Charles I who were hanged, drawn and quartered.
- World War I General Sir Horace Smith-Dorrien (1858–1930) and his heroic naval officer brother Henry Theophilus Smith-Dorrien (1850–1935) who was “more or less responsible for the commencement of the Egyptian War” (1881).

== Political ==
- Henry Cary, 1st Viscount Falkland English landowner and politician who sat in the House of Commons from 1601 to 1622.
- Augustus Smith (15 September 1804 – 31 July 1872) born in Berkhamsted, MP for Truro and governor of the Isles of Scilly, Augustus Smith stopped the enclosure of the Berkhamsted Common. "Possibly no-one ever connected with the town more merits such a recognition than the illustrious educationalist and public-spirited man ... Augustus Smith who restarted Berkhamsted School and was the leading founder of the first elementary school in the locality." West Herts and Watford Observer, 1908. Augustus Smith today is commemorated by the award of the Augustus Smith scholarship for state school students in Berkhamsted.
- Albert Andrews (13 September 1881 – 25 October 1960) was a provincial politician, Alberta, Canada.
- Lawrence Ward, former Serjeant at Arms of the British House of Commons, attended St Thomas More junior school (1977 to 1978) and later lived at Billet Lane from 1999 until 2001.

Moved to Berkhamsted

- During World War II Charles de Gaulle, lived in exiled from Vichy France (October 1941 to September 1942) with his family, at a house called Rodinghead in Frithsden, Berkhamsted

== Sports/physical ==
- Thomas Stevens (24 December 1854–?) was the first person to circle the globe by bicycle. He rode a large-wheeled Ordinary, also known as a penny-farthing, from April 1884 to December 1886.
- Frank Broome (1915–1994), professional footballer and manager
- Jonathan Bond (19 May 1993), professional football goalkeeper

== Others ==
Moved to Berkhamsted

- Richard Scott, early settler of Providence in the Colony of Rhode Island and Providence Plantations
- Edmund Rice, early settler of Massachusetts Bay Colony
- Peter the Wild Boy (c. 1713 – 22 February 1785), feral boy with learning difficulties and possible Pitt–Hopkins syndrome from Germany, who was original brought to England as a curiosity but later was cared for in Northchurch and Berkhamsted.
- Derek Simpson, Joint-General Secretary of the UK's biggest private-sector trade union, Unite, from 2007–2010, previously the General Secretary of Amicus from 2002–2007
- Carolyn McCall, Chief Executive of easyJet

== Association through education in Berkhamsted ==
- Richard Field (1561–1616), clergyman and theologian
- Sir Algernon Methuen (1856–1924), founder and owner, Methuen & Co, publishers, 1889–1924
- Clementine Churchill, Baroness Spencer-Churchill (1885–1977), wife of Winston Churchill
- Charles Seltman (1886–1957), author and archeologist
- Clifford Allen, 1st Baron Allen of Hurtwood (1889–1939), politician and peace campaigner
- Sir Donald Fergusson (1891–1963), Permanent Secretary, Ministry of Agriculture and Fisheries, 1936–1945, and Ministry of Fuel and Power, 1945–1952
- H. W. Tilman (1898–1977), mountaineer and sailor
- A. K. Chesterton (1899–1973), fascist, and first Chairman, National Front, 1967–1971
- F. S. Smythe (1900–1949), mountaineer and author
- Rex Tremlett (1903–1986), author and prospector
- Claud Cockburn (1904–1981), writer and journalist
- Bill Fiske, Baron Fiske (1905–1975), first leader of the Greater London Council, 1964–1967, and Chairman of the Decimal Currency Board
- Sir Peter Quennell (1905–1993), writer and editor
- Sir Colin Buchanan (1907–2001), town planner
- Michael Sherard (1910–1998), born Malcolm Sherrard, fashion designer and academic
- Sir Kenneth Cork (1913–1991), accountant, and Lord Mayor of the City of London, 1978–1979
- Margot Jefferys (1916–1999), Professor of Medical Sociology, Bedford College, London, 1968–1982
- Robert Simons (1922–2011), cricketer
- Stephen Dodgson (1924–2013), composer and broadcaster
- Mary Wimbush (19 March 1924 – 31 October 2005), actress
- Mark Boxer (Marc) (1931–1988), cartoonist and magazine editor
- Michael Podro (1931–2008), art historian
- Alexander Goehr (1932–2024), composer and 1987 Reith Lecture
- Derek Fowlds (1937–2020), actor
- Sir Anthony Cleaver (1938–), Chairman of the Medical Research Council, 1998–2006
- Sir Robin Knox-Johnston (1939–), yachtsman
- John Bly (1939–), antiques expert
- Michael Meacher (1939–), politician
- Kit Wright (1944–), children's poet
- Keith Mans (1946–), politician
- Alan Goldberg (1954–), warden of western marble arch synagogue
- Lieutenant General Sir Mark Mans (1955–), Adjutant-General to the Forces
- Emma Fielding (1966–), actress
- Roger Moorhouse (1968–), historian and author
- Stephen Campbell Moore (1977–), born Stephen Thorpe, actor
- Carla Chases (1984–), actress
- Talulah Riley (1985–), actress
- Simon Minter (7 September 1992–), YouTube personality known as Miniminter
- Roman Kemp (28 January 1993–), radio host, TV personality
- Jonathan Bond (19 May 1993), professional football goalkeeper
- Olajide Olatunji (19 June 1993–), YouTube personality, boxer, rapper, singer and songwriter known as KSI

== Associated with the Manor and/or Berkhamsted castle ==
- Ælfgifu (d. AD 970) queen consort of King Eadwig of England (r. 955–959)
- Robert of Mortain half brother of William the Conqueror
- William, Count of Mortain son of Robert of Mortain
- Ranulf Chancellor of Henry I
- Thomas Becket Archbishop and Chancellor of Henry II of England
- Henry II of England
- Berengaria of Navarre wife of King Richard I of England
- Isabella of Angouleme wife of King John of England
- Geoffrey Fitz Peter, 1st Earl of Essex chief minister of Richard I of England and John of England
- Louis VIII of France captured the castle during the First Barons' War against John of England
- Richard, 1st Earl of Cornwall brother of Henry III
- Sanchia of Provence wife of Richard, 1st Earl of Cornwall
- Edmund, 2nd Earl of Cornwall son of Richard, 1st Earl of Cornwall
- Edward I of England
- Margaret of France wife of Edward I of England
- Piers Gaveston favourite of Edward II
- Isabella of France wife of Edward II
- Edward III
- Edward, the Black Prince eldest son of Edward III
- John II of France prisoner of Edward, the Black Prince
- Joan, the Maid of Kent wife of Edward, the Black Prince
- Richard II of England
- Robert de Vere, Duke of Ireland favourite of Richard II of England
- John Holland, 1st Duke of Exeter favourite of Richard II of England
- Geoffrey Chaucer Clerk of Works
- Henry IV of England
- Henry V of England
- Henry VI of England
- Cecily Neville, Duchess of York, mother of Edward IV and Richard III of England

== Fictional characters ==
- BBC Radio 4 character Ed Reardon, Berkhamsted resident.
