= National Independence Party (UK) =

British far-right political party

The National Independence Party was a minor far-right party that appeared in British politics during the 1970s. The party was led by John Davis and campaigned on a platform similar to that of the much bigger National Front (NF) on anti-immigration, anti-European Economic Community, anti-communism themes.

== Development ==
The party was found by John Davis who had been an ally of Andrew Fountaine before establishing his own group in the late 1960s. Davis was a well-established friend of John O'Brien. When the latter became NF chairman in 1970, co-operation between the two parties increased, as was evidenced by the role Davis played in convincing the National Democratic Party to drop its candidate for the St Marylebone by-election and instead to campaign on behalf of the NF's Malcolm Skeggs.

The close work between the NIP and NF came to an end when John Tyndall took charge of the latter. However, the struggle to gain the leadership had proven divisive and the NIP's ranks were swollen by the defection of O'Brien and his supporters away from the NF. The overall impact was not great, however, as Tyndall and Martin Webster were able to use Spearhead to portray O'Brien as merely a tool of an establishment determined to smash the NF whilst the NIP was little known in comparison to the NF, meaning that some NF members who sympathised with O'Brien were nevertheless not prepared to switch sides. Nonetheless, Air Vice Marshal Don Bennett, a leading opponent of the Common Market, was among the figures to at least temporarily make the NIP the focus of his patronage following O'Brien's defection.

== Elections ==
The party tested its electoral fortunes in the 1972 Uxbridge by-election but performed poorly. Although it finished ahead of one other fringe right-wing candidate, the "Democratic Conservative against the Common Market" candidate Reginald Simmerson, its 1.64% vote share put it behind the Union Movement's Dennis "Big Dan" Harmston (2.6%) and way behind the NF's John Clifton, whose 8.71% vote share was a very good result for the NF at the time. Its best performance came in the February 1974 general election when Michael Coney, standing as "National Independence - Anti-Common Market" captured 4.4% of the vote in Tottenham, finishing ahead of the NF's Roy Painter. This came despite Painter, a former member of the Conservative Party, being a well-known local figure and receiving widespread coverage in the area's press. By this time the relationship between the two parties had deteriorated so much that the NIP was "despised" by the NF.

== Haringey ==
Despite being a minor party, the NIP registered one of the few occurrences of a far-right party securing electoral office in Britain before the 1990s. In 1974, Michael Coney, a local sub-post office manager, stood as NIP candidate for the South Tottenham ward of Haringey London Borough Council and as part of his campaign he appealed to the area's Jewish population not to vote on religious lines due to the Labour Party candidate, Aaron Weichselbaum, being Jewish. Leaders in the local Jewish community interpreted this as an attempt by Coney to whip up antisemitic feelings against Weichselbaum and, whilst another Labour candidate was elected in what was a safe seat, Weichselbaum was defeated by Coney. Coney was independent by the 1978 elections (the NIP having been wound up in the interim) and later served the Conservative Party, but his example of building a strong local base in a single area, which included a 20.3% vote share in the 1973 Greater London Council election, was later lauded by elements within the British National Party who supported Nick Griffin against John Tyndall, due to their support for a similar localist strategy.

== Disappearance ==
The support enjoyed by Coney in Haringey was not replicated elsewhere, however, and the NIP never became more than a minor force. The party, which was closely associated with a group calling itself the Political Independence Movement, failed to challenge the hegemony of the National Front on the far right and had disappeared before the decade was out. Many of its members returned to the NF.
