= National Party (UK, 1976) =

British far-right political party

- Abbreviation: NP
- Leader: John Kingsley Read
- Founder: John Kingsley Read
- Founded: 6 January 1976; 50 years ago
- Dissolved: 1984
- Split from: National Front
- Ideology: British fascism; British nationalism; White nationalism; Factions: Strasserism; Powellism
- Political position: Far-right

The National Party (NP) was a splinter from the British National Front (NF). It was formed in 1976, and dissolved in 1984.

== Background and formation ==
The origins of the party were the result of internal dissention within the Monday Club over "entry to the EEC and immigration" which led to "several leading Powellites" leaving the Conservative Party for the NF, and of later ideological disagreements within the National Front.

John Kingsley Read became leader of the NF in 1974, but faced resistance from John Tyndall and his supporters for his 'populist' approach. The electoral results from the General Election in 1974 showed the three most successful NF candidates "were all from the 'Populist' wing". With Tyndall proposing constitutional reform of the NF the Populist counter-moves to expel him ended in failure. Tyndall went to court which resulted in the reinstatement of "Tyndall and his supporters. Subsequently, the courts also restored the NF headquarters and the membership lists to the Tyndall faction".

Kingsley Read broke from the NF altogether and formed the NP with several other leading NF members. In all over 2000 members, or one quarter of the NF's total membership, joined the new party, which thus represented a considerable loss of support to the NF. At its inaugural meeting the party narrowly voted not to purge the party of "all those with Nazi, Fascist or Communist backgrounds".

== Development of the party ==
Richard Lawson helped shape the ideology of the party the source of which was "the 'soft' National Socialism of Rohm and the SD". Lawson edited the party journal, Britain First, which was published between 1974 and 1977. As well as Powellite Conservatives and NF Populists a number of members were "socially radical Strasserites". The National Party "claimed to be more opposed to immigration than the NF" and sought the "repatriation or resettlement abroad of all coloured and other racial incompatible immigrants, their dependents and descendents". The National Party also circulated Holocaust denial material such as Arthur Butz's The Hoax of the Twentieth Century.

In the local elections of 1976 it had two councillors elected in Blackburn, Lancashire, These were the last electoral successes for any British far-right party until the election of Derek Beackon of the British National Party in 1993. However, the party went into decline during 1977.

Some members, such as Steve Brady, later rejoined the NF, and other members appear to have joined the Nationalist Party.

A Granada TV World in Action investigative documentary in 1976 exposed the pro-Nazi views of Kingsley Read and others despite the fact that one of the reasons Kingsley Read had left the National Front was because of the neo-Nazi backgrounds of some of its members. Kingsley Read later recanted his far right views and re-joined the Conservative Party. Searchlight magazine claimed that he had given them the entire membership list of the party.

In 1979, Andrew Fountaine lead a similar breakaway movement in contempt of the Nazi connections of the National Front, called the Constitutional Movement. However, after little electoral success, it disbanded in 1984.

== Leading members ==
The NP attracted a number of leading figures from the NF/far right to its ranks. These included:

- Gordon Brown of the Greater Britain Movement
- Richard Lawson, editor of Britain First and later associated with the Official National Front and a leading exponent of British folk music.
- David McCalden, a former NF writer who later emigrated to the United States where he became a co-founder of a Holocaust denial organization the Institute for Historical Review.
- Roy Painter, a Conservative Party member from Enfield.
- Denis Pirie, a veteran of the National Socialist Movement, though he later distanced himself from his extremist past.

Other members of note included

- Steve Brady, an influential figure in Loyalist circles in Northern Ireland, a member of the Orange Order, and mainstay of the far right.
- Richard "Jock" Spooner, who emigrated to Australia where he became a leading activist in the One Nation Party.
- Robert Hallman, leader of the Blackburn branch of the NP. Hallman stood unsuccessfully for a By-election on Blackburn council in 1976. He was later arrested for possession of a firearm.
- John Frankman, was elected to Blackburn council alongside Kingsley Read at the 1976 United Kingdom local elections. He was forced to resign as a councillor after it emerged he had had a suspended prison sentence for driving without insurance.

== National Party elections ==
Given that its brief history mainly fell between two general elections the NP only contested three by-elections for Westminster seats. In each of the three elections the NPUK finished behind the NF candidates, namely Andrew Fountaine, Joseph Parker and Paul Kavanagh respectively.

Date of election	Constituency	Candidate	Votes	%
4 March 1976	Coventry North West	John Kingsley Read	208	0.6
4 November 1976	Walsall North	Marian Powell	258	0.7
24 February 1977	City of London and Westminster South	Michael Lobb	364	1.7

=== 1977 Greater London Council election ===
Constituency	Candidate	Votes	Percentage
Bermondsey	L E Clifford	239	1.4
Bexleyheath	J D Turner	287	1.2
Brentford and Isleworth	R W Coker	507	1.4
Croydon Central	W H Porter	299	1.0
Croydon North East	Steve Brady	479	1.9
Croydon North West	P J Weedon	206	0.9
Croydon South	R Dummer	235	0.8
Deptford	M L Dixon	1,496	7.3
Dulwich	E H Arthurton	300	1.1
Ealing North	T Connolly	657	1.7
Feltham and Heston	J F Wood	458	1.4
Greenwich	David McCalden	252	1.2
Harrow East	Alan J Harding	445	1.7
Hayes and Harlington	F Muter	122	0.5
Lewisham East	A H Whitmore	181	0.6
Lewisham West	S G Avis	211	0.7
Peckham	J R Perryman	708	3.9
Tottenham	P I Goldfield	333	2.1
Uxbridge	J F De Ville	325	1.0
Wood Green	J Lennox	172	0.8
Woolwich East	T A Heath	236	1.2
Woolwich West	D Simpson	152	0.5
	Total	8,300	0.4
