= John Kingsley Read =

British politician (1936–1985)

John Kingsley Read (18 April 1936 – 18 September 1985) was a British far-right politician and Holocaust denier. He was chairman of the National Front (NF) from 1974 until 1976, when he founded the National Party.

A former member of the Conservative Party and chairman of the Blackburn Young Conservatives, Read left to join the NF in 1973 having addressed a rally against the arrival of Ugandan Asians in Britain earlier that same year in Blackburn.

A strong orator, Read rose quickly through the NF ranks, his style drawing comparisons to American politician George Wallace, to whom he also bore a passing physical resemblance. Read was later denounced as a drunkard by Andrew Fountaine.

After securing the support of potential rival Roy Painter, Read was elected chairman of the National Front in 1974, with the neo-imperialist John Tyndall his deputy chairman, in what was regarded as a vote by the "populist" or Strasserite wing of the party against the authoritarian Tyndall.

Later, Read himself "drifted" into the populist camp but was only narrowly re-elected as chairman in 1975. He tried to expel Tyndall from the party but Read's decision was overturned at the High Court.

In 1976, Read left the NF along with many of his followers to establish the National Party (NP), which won two seats on Blackburn Council, one of them held by Read, but their other councillor was disqualified for election irregularities.

Read designed the front cover motif for the British edition of Arthur Butz's Holocaust denial book, The Hoax of the Twentieth Century, which was circulated by the NP. After the murder of a young Sikh man, Gurdip Singh Chaggar, in a suspected racist attack, Read allegedly remarked during a speech at an NP meeting, "One down, a million to go," which effectively ended his presentation of a more "moderate" stance. Read was later acquitted of making the statement in a decision which aroused "furious controversy".

Following Read's death in 1985, Nick Griffin said that Kingsley Read had been working with the knowledge of other leading members of the NF to feed false information to Searchlight magazine, although John Tyndall was convinced that Read had been a double agent. Searchlight stated that Read had supplied them with the entire membership list of the National Party.

In 1984, Read appeared in The Other Face of Terror, a British documentary about far-right groups. Read openly admitted designing and helping to distribute Holocaust denial material.

== Elections contested ==
Date of election	Constituency	Party	Votes	%
February 1974	Blackburn	NF	1,778	4.2
October 1974	Blackburn	NF	1,758	4.4
4 March 1976	Coventry NW	NP	208	0.6
