= Roy Painter =

English far-right politician (1933–2026)

Roy William Painter (14 May 1933 – 23 April 2026) was a leading figure on the British far right.

== Life and career ==
Roy William Painter was born in London on 14 May 1933. Enlisting in the British Army in 1951, he fought in the Korean War the following year, working as a radio operator.

Painter later worked as a London cab driver, during which time he was a leading member of the Conservatives in Tottenham and stood as a candidate for them in the Greater London Council. A supporter of Enoch Powell, he was involved with the Conservative Monday Club, although he resigned from the group and the Conservative Party in 1972 when the Club began a process of removing its most extreme members. Following his resignation, Painter joined the National Front, rapidly rising to a post on the NF Directorate by 1974.

He made a weak start as a party candidate for the NF in Tottenham at the February 1974 general election; he finished with 1,270 votes (4.1%), behind the National Independence Party candidate. An improvement was shown in the October 1974 election when he captured 2,211 votes (8.3%) in the same seat. It has been argued that the vote was as much a personal one for Painter, a popular businessman in Haringey, as it was an endorsement of the NF.

Painter became a prominent figure in the 'populist' wing of the NF, opposing John Tyndall and Martin Webster. He wrote an article in a 1974 issue of Spearhead entitled "Let's Make Nationalism Popular" which extolled the virtues of this path. It was followed by a rebuttal from Tyndall who described Painter's arguments as "sheer unadulterated claptrap". Whilst espousing populism, Painter is said to have told Martin Webster, "I am a national socialist at heart. Only I am careful." The 'populists', however, began to outvote Tyndall on the Directorate and Painter dismissed Tyndall as a "tin pot Führer".

He was believed by The Guardian to be a potential rival leader. However, he instead supported John Kingsley Read. Kingsley Read came under bitter attack from the hardliners who regained control of the party in 1976. "Kingsley Read, Roy Painter and other ex-Conservative populists" left to form the short-lived National Party and Painter was appointed its Directorate.

Painter rejoined the Conservatives in 1978, although his role with them was confined to local politics.

He continued to be involved on the fringe of the far right. In 2003, with Ian Anderson, he addressed a conference organised by the Conservative Democratic Alliance. In 2006 he was photographed alongside Derek Turner, editor of Right Now! magazine at the annual dinner of the Traditional Britain Group.

In 2012, he gave a speech entitled "Was Enoch [Powell] right about immigration?" to a seminar organised by Alan Harvey head of the Springbok Club and briefly chairman of the Swinton Circle, with whom he had been in the National Party.

Painter died on 23 April 2026, aged 92.

== Elections contested ==
Date of election	Constituency	Party	Votes	%	Source
February 1974	Tottenham	NF	1270	4.1	The Guardian, 2 Mar 1974
October 1974	Tottenham	NF	2211	8.3	The Guardian, 12 Oct 1974
