= Truth (British periodical) =

British periodical publication

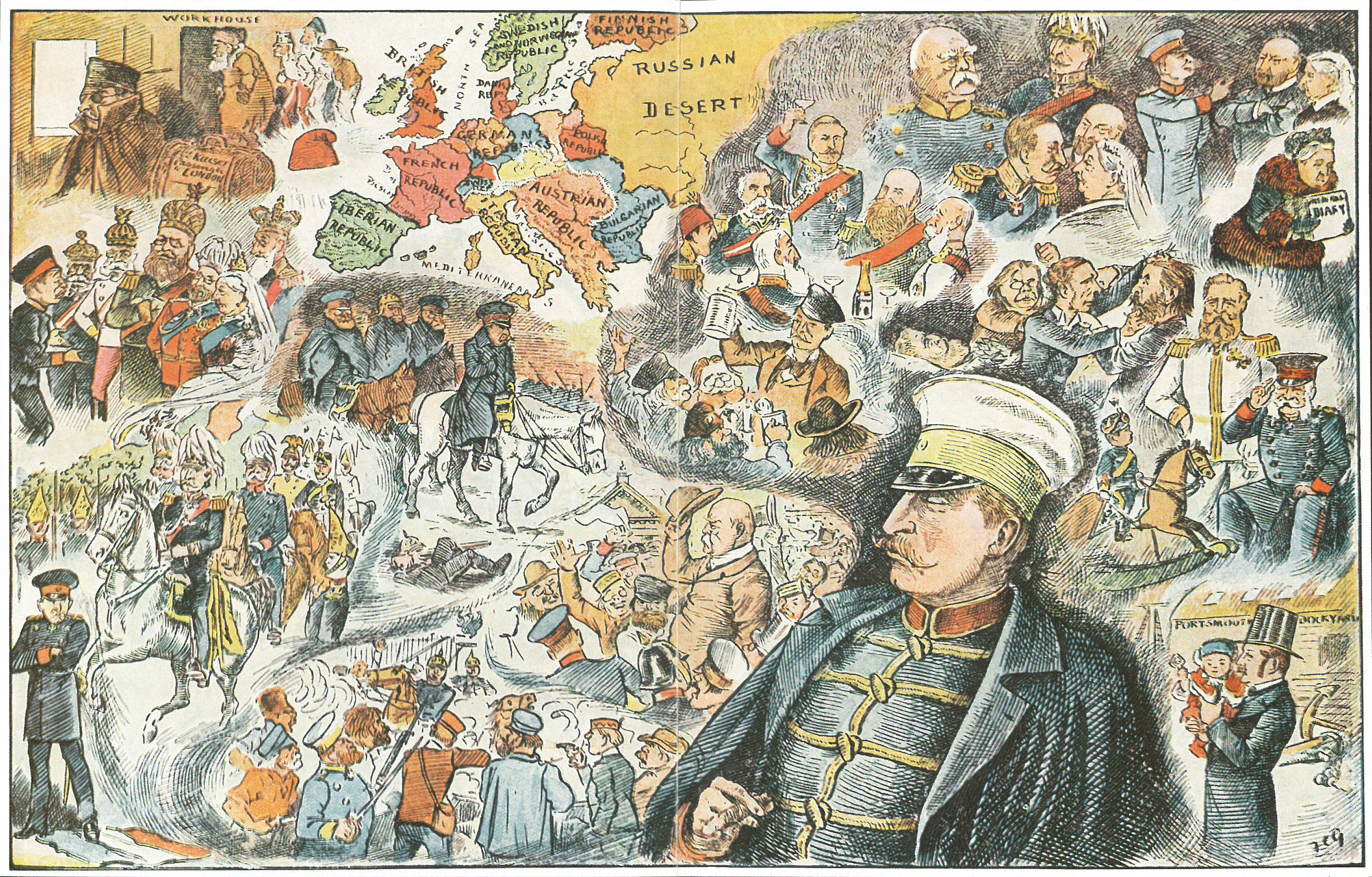
Illustration of "The Kaiser's Dream", 1890, Christmas Edition

Truth was a British periodical publication founded by the diplomat and Liberal politician Henry Labouchère. The first issue was published on 4 January 1877. Labouchère founded the periodical after he left a virtual rival publication, The World. Truth was known for its exposures of many kinds of frauds, and was at the centre of several civil lawsuits. Although Labouchère himself contributed to Truth, it was for the most part controlled by Horace Voules in its early days.

Later in its existence, Truth was close to the Conservative Party. In 1941, it was briefly the subject of political controversy following allegations made in Parliament, but publication continued when the allegations were refuted. Later, Truth came under the direction of Collin Brooks. In its final years, it moved away from its right-wing editorial line back to the more liberal agenda of its early days. Truth ceased publication in 1957.

== Exposés ==
The Christmas Edition 1890 received international attention, as it published a conversation with a professor of hypnosis who described a dream of the German Emperor, under the title "The Kaiser's Dream". In this dream, the Kaiser engages in a war with Russia which results in the fall of all the monarchies of Europe, and Truth presented a colored map to show the results after this war. The story about "The Kaiser's Dream" was sometimes interpreted to be a prophecy for the First World War. At that time the magazine had a circulation of one million.

In 1892, Labouchère exposed the Society of Science, Letters and Art as a fraudulent learned society which invited eminent but gullible persons, as well as ordinary people interested in the sciences and arts, to pay for fellowship and for permission to append the letters F.S.Sc. after their name.

== Ramps and libels ==
Under Labouchère, whom media of the time called an "unruly" man, Truth became known for both its investigative journalism into frauds and its legal troubles. The newspaper was sued many times, mostly unsuccessfully. In 1934, Conservative Party politician Derek Walker-Smith, Baron Broxbourne sympathetically wrote:

Truth, under the able administration of Labouchère and his editor, Mr Voules, had established a formidable reputation as the fearless exposer of "bogus" companies and commercial "ramps". Libel actions were brought against them by promoters and financiers, stung into action by the provocative directness of Truth, but they always failed, and Messrs. Labouchère and Voules went on their way rejoicing.

During Collin Brooks' time as editor of Truth, he kept one in-tray for letters and another for libels.

== Political controversy ==
A major controversy on Truth and its political agenda came during World War II. Josiah Wedgwood, a Labour MP, spoke in Parliament in October 1941 accusing Truth of being fascist and "a Quisling paper" and called for publication to be halted.

This situation was particularly embarrassing, as the publication had been virtually under the ownership of the Conservative Party for five years by that date, having been bought by the National Publicity Bureau and with Lord Luke as Chairman of Directors. The allegations were rebutted, Truth continued to be published, and the Home Office successfully reduced the debate. Collin Brooks had taken over the Editorship of Truth a year earlier, Friday 15 November 1940, and was editor from 1940 to 1953. His deputy was A. K. Chesterton, who had earlier been associated with Oswald Mosley's fascist movement and later became chairman of the far right-wing National Front.

== Post-war ==
Truth passed through various owners after the death of Labouchère before becoming a Limited Company under the majority control of director Collin Brooks, with S.J. Elliott and John Gray as the other two directors by 1947. Viscount Camrose considered only six periodicals of the day to be worthy of mention as "political periodicals" in his book anticipating the requirements of the Royal Commission's report on the control of the press, of which Truth was one. In 1953, Truth was put up for sale, and was bought by Ronald Staples, a publisher who was interested in publishing a weekly magazine. He removed all the right-wing staff, radically changed what he called the "extremely whiffy political and racial line", and appointed a new editorial staff, headed by Vincent Evans.

The last issue of Truth was published on 27 December 1957. Its last editor, George Edwin Scott, learned of its closure the following day in a letter from the principal shareholder, the Staples printing and publishing group, which no longer wished to maintain the publication following the death of Ronald Staples. Scott's deputy in the last years of publication was the young Bernard Levin. Other members of the editorial staff in the last years of publication included Anthony Howard and Alan Brien.

== See also ==
- Candour (magazine), successor magazine founded by A. K. Chesterton

== Sources ==
- Camrose, William Ewart Berry (1947), British Newspapers and Their Controllers, Cassell & Co. Ltd, OCLC 1658231
- Crowson, N.J. (1998), Fleet Street, Press Barons and Politics: The Journals of Collin Brooks, 1932–1940, Cambridge University Press, ISBN 978-0-521-66239-0
- Walker-Smith, Derek (1934), Lord Reading and his cases: the study of a great career, Chapman and Hall, OCLC 1904985
