= Richard Lawson (activist) =

British far-right politician

Richard Lawson has been a member of various far right groups in the United Kingdom.

Lawson was the Student Organiser for the British National Front. In 1976, he was part of the Strasserite split away from the National Front which formed the National Party.

He founded IONA (Islands of North Atlantic) group in the mid-1980s for the purpose of "the study, revival, promotion and development of the islands of the North Atlantic". Presenting itself as an intellectual elite concerned with British culture and environment, it was closely linked to the far right magazine Scorpion. IONA has subsequently been characterised as a Nazi group.

Lawson contributed articles to Michael Walker's Scorpion magazine, as well as co-organising at least one conference with the publication.

In 1989, Lawson was involved with setting up the Transeuropa Collective to discuss "European identities, autonomies and initiatives". Transeuropa published ten issues of a journal titled Perspectives. The magazine was criticised by Searchlight magazine for anti-semitism and for infiltrating the green movement. Here & Now magazine's review stated that Perspectives "says 'Green' but means 'White'".

In 1995, Lawson launched the Fluxeuropa website as "A postmodernist cultural review of art, books, films and music focusing on the creative tension between tradition and modernity." Around this time, he also became involved with Alternative Green magazine along with Troy Southgate.

In 1997, Transeuropa launched a new magazine called Radical Shift. Searchlight magazine described the magazine's intention as "to delegitimise anti-racism, anti-fascism and liberal democracy in favour of... ethnic separation, bigoted regionalism and chauvinistic nationalism".
