= The Pope's Dilemma =

2015 book by Jacques Kornberg

First edition (publ. University of Toronto Press)

The Pope's Dilemma: Pius XII Faces Atrocities and Genocide in the Second World War (2015) is a book by Canadian historian Jacques Kornberg which examines Pope Pius XII and the Holocaust, a controversial topic. Kornberg is moderately critical of the pope, especially for the lack of public statements of Pope Pius XII on the Holocaust. According to Kornberg, the pope's priority was keeping Nazi-sympathizing Catholics in the fold and maintaining his influence in Catholic countries. The book received mostly positive reviews in academic publications.
