= Candour (magazine) =

British far-right-wing magazine

- September 2013 issue of Candour.
- Founder: Arthur K. Chesterton
- Publisher: A.K. Chesterton Trust
- Editor-in-chief: Colin Todd
- Founded: 30 October 1953
- Political alignment: Far-right
- Language: English
- Country: Britain
- Website: candour.org.uk

Candour is a British far-right political magazine founded by journalist and political activist A. K. Chesterton, appearing weekly from 1953 to 1960, and in to eight to ten issues per year by 1999, and irregularly published as of 2022.

The magazine displayed a "stolidly conservative" stance under the leadership of Chesterton, who feared that open racial hatred would tarnish the magazine's reputation and tried to cultivate a more respectable, conservative image. After Chesterton's death in 1973, Candour was edited by Rosine de Bounevialle until her own death in 1999. Since that year, the magazine has appeared intermittently under editor-in-chief Colin Todd, with an associated website.

== History ==
=== Background ===
Candour was founded by journalist Arthur K. Chesterton as the successor to Truth. Following the 1953 takeover of Truth by the Staples Press, which insisted on adopting a new mainstream Conservative editorial policy and dropping the openly anti-Jewish content, Chesterton promptly resigned as deputy editor, along with the editor Collin Brooks. Chesterton then had The Britons published a pamphlet denouncing the new leadership, Truth has been murdered, and asked his readers for backing for a new journal in the style of the old Truth.

=== 1953–1973 ===
Chesterton initially struggled to win enthusiastic support when demanding for funds, but he eventually obtained the financial backing of R. K. Jeffery, a Chilean-based English millionaire who had made a fortune in copper-mining before the First World War. Other backing soon followed, and the first edition of Candour – "the British Views Letter" – was published on 30 October 1953. The four-page weekly was printed by Clair Press, a firm operated by Tony Gittens, who ran The Britons. The first issue detailed the magazine's mission of denouncing the forces opposing the British Empire – primarily the United States, nicknamed the "Dollar Empire".

The British Empire is disintegrating. Whoever denies that fact is a fool or a knave... In place of the British Empire, there arises the Empire of the United States. We have no quarrel on that account with the American people, who are entitled to what their dollars can buy. Our quarrel is with our own abject leadership, of whatever party, which has supinely allowed the Dollar Empire to grow fat at our expense, crowding us off the stage of history.

— ‘Sound the Alarm!’, Candour, 30 October 1953

The League of Empire Loyalists (LEL), founded in October 1954 by Chesterton – along with Candour as the group's periodical – was dedicated to preserving British imperialism. Its readership expanded beyond England to various parts of the former British Empire, including Australia, New Zealand and Rhodesia. According to scholar Luke LeCras, "although Candour and the LEL placed increasing focus on the 'coloured invasion' in their campaigns, Chesterton was wary of tarnishing his movement’s reputation with accusations of violence or racial hatred following the riots at Notting Hill in April 1958. [...] Candour and the LEL were both beset by accusations of harbouring fascist tendencies despite Chesterton and his supporters' efforts to cultivate a more respectable, conservative image."

Chesterton died in August 1973.

=== 1973–1999 ===
Following Chesterton's death, Candour was edited by Rosine de Bounevialle (1916–1999) until her own death. Since 1996 its owning trust's objects are "to promote and expound the principles of A.K. Chesterton which are defined as being to demonstrate the power of, and to combat the power [elsewhere called by its publisher 'menace'] of International Finance, and to promote the National Sovereignty of the British World." Another self-declared aim of the magazine is to serve as a link between Britons all over the world in protest against the surrender of their world heritage.

=== After 1999 ===
Candour still continues to be published by the A.K. Chesterton Trust, although increasingly irregularly. The latest issue as of April 23, 2025 is no. 888 published in February/March 2025 (exact date not given). It operates mainly by subscription, and some issues are out of stock according to its website.

== Sources ==
- J Bean, "Many Shades of Black", New Millennium, 1999.
- "A.K. Chesterton M.C. - A Memorial Booklet", Candour, 1973.
- "Candour, vol. 34, number 1", January 1983.
- "Candour, vol.73, number 1", July 2000.
