= Rex Tremlett =

South African mining engineer and journalist

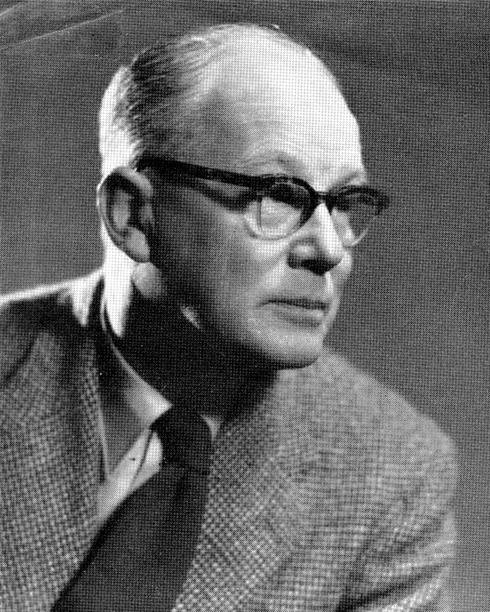
Portrait of Rex Tremlett; from the reverse of Road to Ophir (1961).

Horace Rex Tremlett (8 June 1903 – 1986) was a British-South African mining engineer, journalist and fascist activist.

== Biography ==
=== Early life and education ===
Horace Rex Tremlett was born on 8 June 1903, the son of Horace Samuel Tremlett (1858–1941), an English mining engineer who helped develop the city of Johannesburg, and Jane Robinson Brunton (1875–1948), a fiction writer known under the pen name Mrs. Horace Tremlett. Her best-known book, With the Tin Gods (1914), is an account of her experience in Africa as she accompanied her husband on a journey from Lagos to Niger, and into Nigeria until 1912.

Tremlett studied at Berkhamsted School, Hertfordshire, where he was a schoolmate of journalist A. K. Chesterton and politician Ben Greene, then attended Camborne School of Mines in Cornwall. At the age of 16 he began to search for gold in Nyasaland, journeying across Central Africa until 1928. Tremlett worked as a mining engineer and a journalist in Johannesburg, then moved back to England.

=== Fascist activist ===
In the early 1930s, Tremlett was a member of the British Union of Fascists (BUF), serving as Oswald Mosley's deputy director of publications and as the editor of BUF's newspapers Fascist Week and The Blackshirt. After several meetings together, Tremlett convinced A. K. Chesterton to join the party in November 1933. In 1934 he resigned from the BUF with 'The National' and the 'New January Club' splinter group.

In 1945 Tremlett attended the founding meeting of the National Front along with Chesterton. According to his personal MI5 file, however, he appeared to "have moderated his views" by the 1950s, and Tremlett's file, which had been opened in February 1934, was not updated after April 1957.

=== Later life ===
In 1949 Tremlett was the subject of the black-and-white 3m27s-long BBC television documentary Cornish Farmer Turns Tin Miner, which tells his story as he was reworking an old mine on his farm near St Austell, Cornwall, during the post-WWII recovery period. In the 1950s he renewed with journalism and became involved with BBC television, mainly on farming programs.

Tremlett published his autobiography in three parts: Easy Going (1940), the story of his experiences with various cultures on three continents, Road to Ophir (1956), the story of his past life as a mining engineer in Africa, and Gold in the Morning Sun (1983), which he subtitled "travels and adventures of a new West Australian".

Tremlett was a regular contributor to MANAS Journal and a friend of E. F. Schumacher.
