= Scott Hastie =

British poet

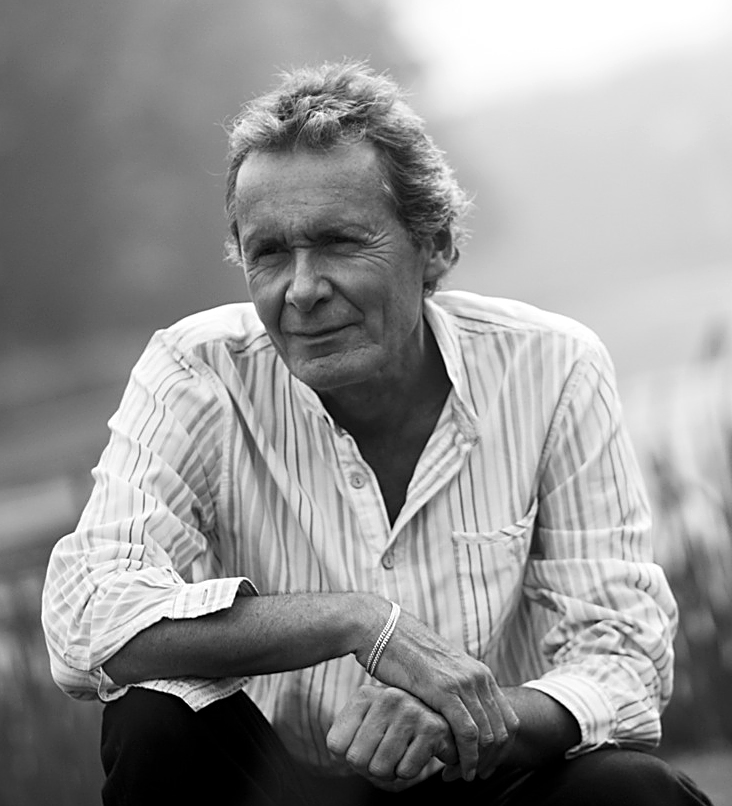
- Photo of the Author and Poet Scott Hastie taken at Wrest Park, Bedfordshire
- Born: Peter Scott Hastie; 13 April 1954; Edinburgh, Scotland
- Died: 26 June 2025 (aged 71); Bournemouth
- Occupations: Poet, writer

Scott Hastie (13 April 1954 – 26 June 2025), was an author and poet. He wrote extensively about southwest Hertfordshire and his poems covered topics such as the beauty of the natural world.

== Early life ==
Born in Edinburgh, Hastie was brought up and educated in Berkhamsted, prior to college studies at Brighton Polytechnic and Sussex University.

== Life and work ==
Several small press editions of Hastie’s poetry first appeared in the early 1970s, at a time when he was also editor of the college magazine for Sussex University and Brighton Polytechnic (1974–75) These early anthologies prefaced the first substantial hardback collection of his work Selected Poetry (1991) which soon found a core audience with its broadly romantic themes, celebrating love and the beauty of the natural world. "To write and sell poetry at a profit these days is a minor victory and a major achievement. Scott’s words gently unlock and force you to face and look at the world with a little more optimism. There are moments of deep joy and others, which take your breath away with simple incredible honesty"

An increasingly spiritual emphasis was apparent in his next collection New Poetry, which followed in 1995. "Scott Hastie’s verse is sympathetic, humanistic and positively affirmative. Accessibility is the touchstone of all Hastie's output… The spiritual element in his writing is clear."

Hastie also wrote and was published in the field of local history. His studies of life in one historically significant part of South West Hertfordshire have provided a panorama of English life through the ages. "Scott Hastie’s passion for local history has to date spawned no fewer than five carefully researched and lavishly illustrated hardback volumes. A Hertfordshire Valley, first published in 1996, continues to be a best selling seminal work today"

Hastie's first novel, Reunion, was published in 2003 and his collection of poems, Meditations, was published in 2013. His poetry is now regularly featured and showcased in online blogs and web journals, especially in the US and Asia. He commented, "The over-arching theme of my work is a personal investigation into the positive potential of the human spirit." "Scott Hastie writes meditative, reflective poetry that is steeped in the traditions of English verse. Concise and richly evocative, he should be widely read."

Given the growing cross-cultural interest in his work, a new more substantial and comprehensive edition of his work, Angel Voices, was brought forward for publication in 2014. "Angel Voices is Scott Hastie's fourth and most significant collection of poetry to date, providing definitive evidence of his evolved voice and enlightened philosophy."

His poetic output was re-edited and consolidated into the spiritually themed landmark collection threads, which was translated and released to international acclaim in 2016. "Via an invisible gilded chain of perception, Scott Hastie generously leads us through an enthusiastic re-invention of the possibilities of new experience. His inspired words bestride the world with such ease, touching the deepest sensibilities of human beings everywhere."

In March 2020, Scott published his collection titled Pranic Poetry at the onset of the Coronavirus pandemic. Shortly thereafter, in October 2020, Scott released of his first fully retrospective collection Timeless: the best of Scott Hastie's poetry 1990–2020 and its companion volume Splinters of Light: quotations from the poetry of Scott Hastie.

"It is at times like these that we need the fairest glimpses of hope, rejuvenation and a deeper understanding of the potential to realize our very best, especially in the face of such on-going adversity. Perhaps this is why Scott Hastie's poetry achieves such an impact and is so well received around the world. Scott Hastie’s writing inspires such clarity of thought, perception and heartfelt compassion for the emotional rainbow that is the human spectrum of existence; shedding multitudes of color and light where otherwise there might have only been storms, darkness, sorrow and pain, all without any real hope of joy and redemption."

"Timeless is surely an appropriate trademark for some highlights of Scott Hastie’s body of work to date. After all, he has produced some of the most gallant and elegant poetry of the 20th & 21st Centuries."

Scott Hastie died at Studland on 26 June 2025, aged 71.

== Books ==
- Kings Langley: A Hertfordshire Village KLLHMS 1991 ISBN 095076471X
- Selected Poetry Centuria 1991 ISBN 0950977020
- Abbots Langley: A Hertfordshire Village ALPC 1993 ISBN 0952092905
- New Poetry Centuria 1995 ISBN 0950977039
- Hertfordshire Valley Alpine Press 1996 ISBN 0952863103
- Hemel Hempstead: story of new town development 1947-1997 DBC 1997 ISBN 0951153927
- Berkhamsted: an illustrated history Alpine Press 1999 ISBN 0952863111
- Reunion – the novel Centuria 2003 ISBN 0950977047
- Meditations – new poetry by Scott Hastie Centuria 2013 ISBN 0950977055
- Angel Voices – the poetry of Scott Hastie Centuria 2014 ISBN 978-0-9509770-7-2
- "threads – the poetry of Scott Hastie" Centuria 2016 ISBN 978 0992 7093 03
- Pranic Poetry Centuria 2020 ISBN 9780992709334
- Timeless Centuria 2020 ISBN 9780992709358
- Splinters of Light Centuria 2020 ISBN 9780992709372
