= Arthur Butz =

American Holocaust denier (born 1933)

- Born: 1933 (age 92–93)
- Education: Massachusetts Institute of Technology; University of Minnesota
- Known for: Holocaust denial
- Scientific career
- Fields: Electrical engineering
- Workplaces: Northwestern University
- Thesis: Perceptron type learning algorithms in nonseparable situations (1967)

Arthur R. Butz (born 1933) is an associate professor of electrical engineering at Northwestern University and a Holocaust denier, best known as the author of the pseudohistorical book The Hoax of the Twentieth Century. He achieved tenure in 1974 and currently teaches classes in control system theory and digital signal processing.

== Education and career ==
Born in 1933, Butz attended the Massachusetts Institute of Technology, from which he received both his Bachelor of Science and, in 1956, his Master of Science degrees. In 1965, he received his PhD from the University of Minnesota. His 111-page doctoral dissertation, "Perceptron type learning algorithms in non-separable situations," considered a problem in control engineering - an abridged version was published as an article two years later in Journal of Mathematical Analysis and Applications.

== Publications ==
Butz invented the algorithm which bears his name and was published in 1969. It provided a means for computing Hilbert's space-filling curve. This algorithm greatly advanced certain computer search techniques and has several other applications. It is used to this day. Butz is the author of numerous technical papers.

== Holocaust denial ==
In 1976, after he received tenure, Butz published The Hoax of the Twentieth Century: The Case Against the Presumed Extermination of European Jewry, an antisemitic, pseudohistorical book which argues that the Holocaust was a propaganda hoax. From 1980 to 2001, Butz was on the editorial board of the Journal of Historical Review, a publication of the Institute for Historical Review, a Holocaust-denying organization.

=== Faculty reaction ===
Butz's Holocaust denial sparked an outrage among the Northwestern University's faculty and community, after the existence of the book was disclosed by The Daily Northwestern in 1977. His views were also criticized by Robert H. Strotz, Northwestern University's president at the time of the book's publication. In 1997, Butz drew further criticism after using the university's Internet domain to publish his views.

In 2006, sixty of Butz's colleagues from the Department of Electrical Engineering and Computer Science faculty signed a censure describing Butz's Holocaust denial as "an affront to our humanity and our standards as scholars". The letter also called for Butz to "leave our Department and our University and stop trading on our reputation for academic excellence."

University President Henry Bienen issued a statement condemning Butz' Holocaust denial, but noted that tenure and academic freedom protected Butz from dismissal as he had kept his denialism separate from his work as an instructor. Instead, after the book's existence had been disclosed in 1977, the university began hosting symposia and developing courses on the Holocaust, created an endowed professorship on the subject, and funded a political science fellowship dedicated to study of the Holocaust. Northwestern has a policy applying only to Butz: if he teaches a course which is required for graduation or any degree program, another section of that course must be offered at the same time so no student ever has to enroll in one of his classes.

=== Debunking ===
According to the Anti-Defamation League, "some Holocaust deniers argue that Butz's book has never been refuted by mainstream scholars, but in fact many of his arguments were thoroughly debunked" in books by Deborah Lipstadt (Denying the Holocaust, 1993) and John C. Zimmerman (Holocaust Denial: Demographics, Testimonies and Ideologies, 2000), and web sites such as Nizkor Project and www.anti-rev.org. Historian Jacques Kornberg, in a 1995 analysis, found that Butz had provided no evidence to support his claims that the Nuremberg trial defendants were tortured, and that his accusations were instead based on unproven allegations of torture associated with other trials unconnected to Nuremberg, such as the Dachau Military Tribunal.

=== Removal from Amazon ===
In 2017, Amazon.com removed the book along with other Holocaust-denying books from its US and UK sites. The removal of the books from the platform was requested by the director of the Yad Vashem library, Robert Rozett, who sent an email directly to Amazon CEO Jeff Bezos.

== See also ==
- Evidence and documentation for the Holocaust
- Historical negationism
