= The Hoax of the Twentieth Century =

1975 Holocaust denial book

- First edition
- Author: Arthur Butz
- Language: English
- Genre: Non-fiction
- Publisher: Historical Review Press
- Publication date: 1975
- Publication place: United Kingdom

The Hoax of the Twentieth Century: The Case Against the Presumed Extermination of European Jewry is a book by Northwestern University electrical engineering professor and Holocaust denier Arthur Butz. The book was originally published in 1975 in the United Kingdom by Anthony Hancock’s Historical Review Press, known as a Holocaust denial publisher. An antisemitic work, it has been influential in the Holocaust denial movement.

== Synopsis ==
Butz argues that Nazi Germany did not exterminate millions of Jews using homicidal gas chambers during World War II and that the Holocaust was a propaganda hoax.

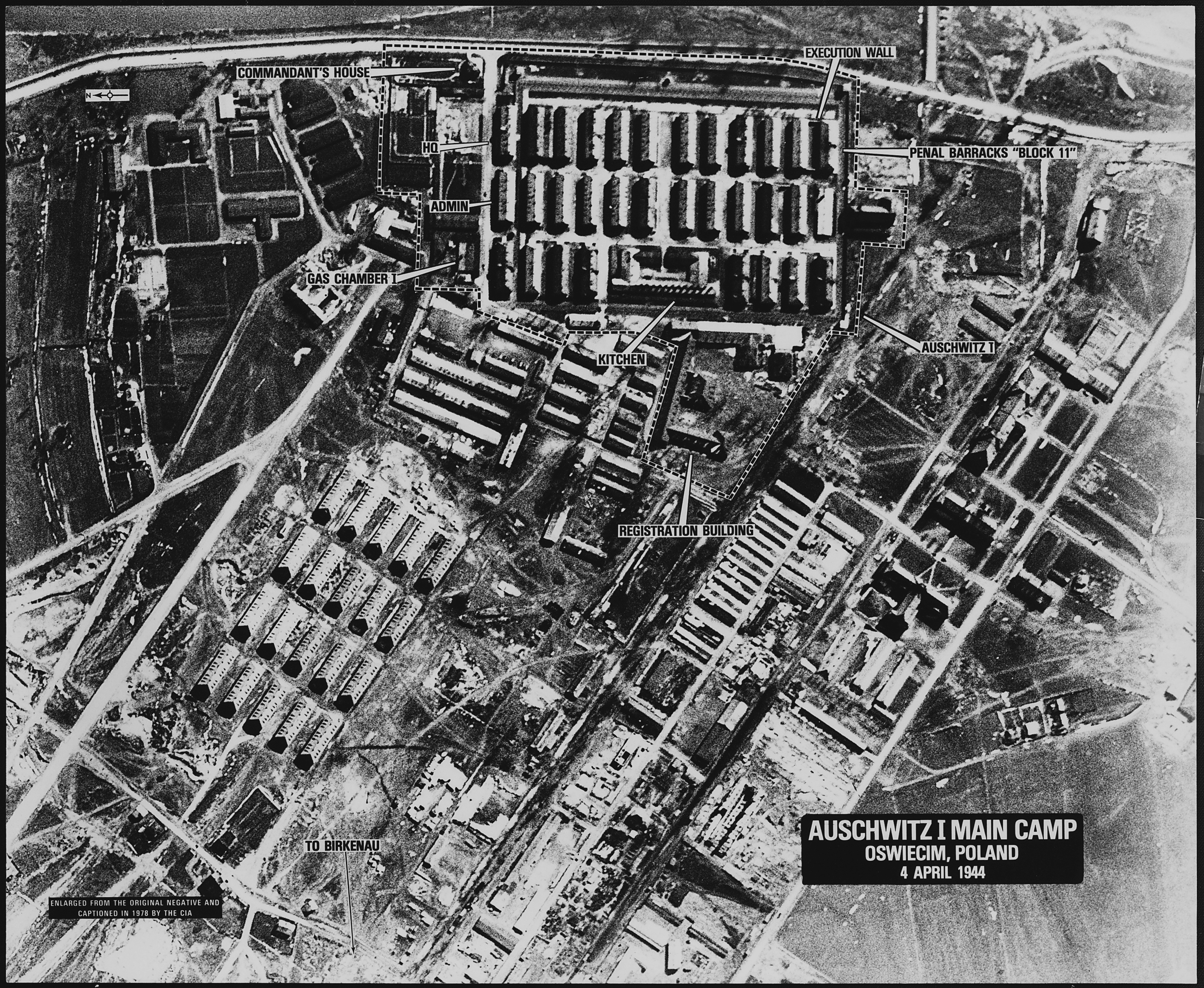
An aerial reconnaissance photograph of the Auschwitz concentration camp (4th April 1944)

The main arguments Butz presents in the book to back up his claims are:

- the overwhelming majority of deaths in Nazi-administered concentration camps were caused by a typhus outbreak rather than any deliberate extermination policy
- the Final Solution was actually a program to round up and then expel Jewish people from Europe into the remnants of the Soviet Union after the Wehrmacht had secured "lebensraum"
- the missing millions of Jews in Eastern Europe after World War II can be explained by their pre-war mass emigration to countries such as America and British Palestine, combined with the dramatic redrawing of sovereign borders skewing the population statistics of any post-war census
- defendants at the Nuremberg trials, such as Rudolf Höss, were beaten into making incriminating confessions that a program of killing Jews was enacted by the Nazis
- extermination camps didn't exist, as concentration camp inmates, who were primarily incarcerated for punitive or security reasons, were actually a valuable source of penal labour to the German government for military production
- the Red Cross inspected several concentration camps scattered around German-occupied Europe during the war, including Auschwitz and Theresienstadt, and could find no evidence of deliberate mistreatment of Jewish inmates at any of them
- aerial reconnaissance photographs of Auschwitz taken by the Allies in early 1944 show no evidence of the claimed mass outdoor burning of bodies, and the crematory chimneys appear inactive
- captured German documents reference a program of expulsion and resettlement of Jews, and do not contain any references to gas chambers or extermination camps

== Reception ==
Canadian academic Alan T. Davies has described it as an "antisemitic classic". A 1978 German Studies Review article criticized Butz's writings and conclusions, describing the book as a "dull" work which systematically ignored or attempted to discredit any evidence of the Holocaust's existence, even evidence produced by Nazi officials.

The book has been banned in Canada and is X-rated in Germany, where it cannot be displayed or advertised. In 2017, the online book seller Amazon.com removed the book, along with other Holocaust-denying titles, from its US and UK sites.
