= Spearhead (magazine) =

British far-right magazine

- The cover page of Spearhead, №409, March 2003
- Founding editor: John Tyndall
- Editor: Richard Verrall
- Categories: Politics
- Frequency: Monthly
- First issue: 1964; 62 years ago
- Final issue: 2005; 21 years ago
- Country: United Kingdom
- Based in: London
- Language: English
- Website: www.spearhead.co.uk
- ISSN: 1364-7105
- OCLC: 5425302

Spearhead was a British far-right magazine edited by John Tyndall until his death in July 2005. Founded in 1964 by Tyndall, it was used to voice his grievances against the state of the United Kingdom. The magazine has not continued under new editorship, although a new article appeared on the magazine's website in October 2010.

== History ==
The magazine was established in August 1964 in London as the magazine of the Greater Britain Movement, edited by John Tyndall. The magazine was originally published irregularly, later becoming a quarterly and finally transitioning to a monthly. When, in 1967, the GBM became part of the National Front (NF), Spearhead was independent, but served as the official mouthpiece of the NF from then until 1980, mirroring its editor's involvement in this organisation. Opponents of its editor's political views regard it as an outlet for racist and neo-Nazi material, although Tyndall himself denied this. It was published by Albion Press in Croyden and Teddington. From issue 20 in 1968, the NF's magazine Combat was incorporated into Spearhead. Richard Verrall co-edited the magazine for a time.

While Tyndall was leader of the British National Party, he used the magazine as a platform for promoting the policies of the BNP. When he lost the leadership election to Nick Griffin he started to use it to attack the current BNP leadership. In the light of this, along with the very much more 'hardline' opinions carried by the publication, which were not considered to be in line with current BNP thinking, the BNP consequently decided to prohibit the sale of Spearhead at BNP meetings. Tyndall was also expelled for related reasons, although he was later readmitted following an out-of-court settlement with the party. He was subsequently expelled again before his death.

The magazine had a limited circulation and was not easily obtainable in most British newsagents, and most public libraries refused to accept copies because of the subject matter of the publication. It was largely distributed by mail order subscription, and it had and still has a considerable Internet presence, with many of its articles being published on the magazine's website. This is still online, with a new article appearing on the site in October 2010. The site also contains a catalogue of books considered to be relevant to the magazine's themes and ideas; although many of these books contain far-right content, often taking the form of antisemitic conspiracy theories, there are some more surprising entries, such as George Orwell's Nineteen Eighty-Four and Greg Palast's The Best Democracy Money Can Buy. There are also many books promoting Social Credit, two books by David Icke and three by Richard Body.

In July 2010, Spearhead made a return as a bi-monthly magazine of the National Front although Valerie Tyndall, Tyndall's wife, made a complaint on the Spearhead archive website that the return of Spearhead has been made in the interests of a former foe of Tyndall, Erik Ericksson, and that it was not in the interest of Tyndall to have Spearhead in continuation after his death. Valerie also claimed that "Erik Ericksson" was the nom de plume of Eddy Morrison.
