= Greater Britain Movement =

British far right political organisation

- Leader: John Tyndall
- Founder: John Tyndall
- Founded: 1964
- Dissolved: 1967
- Preceded by: National Socialist Movement
- Merged into: National Front
- Headquarters: Nationalist Centre, Tulse Hill, London
- Newspaper: Spearhead
- Student wing: National Student Front
- Ideology: Neo-Nazism; British nationalism

The Greater Britain Movement was a British far right political group formed by John Tyndall in 1964 after he split from Colin Jordan's National Socialist Movement. The name of the group was derived from The Greater Britain, a 1932 book by Oswald Mosley.

== Formation ==
While the roots of the split between Tyndall and Jordan was considered to be the marriage of Jordan to Françoise Dior – who had previously been romantically involved with Tyndall – Tyndall himself stated that the rift between the two men was a consequence of an ideological clash resulting from his rejection of Jordan's endorsement of straight Nazism and his own preference for a more 'British' solution. Before the split, and during their spell as members of the British National Party, Jordan had faced the same criticism from John Bean with Tyndall increasingly echoing Bean's view. This division led to a showdown at the April 1964 NSM conference when Tyndall demanded that Jordan give control of the movement to him.

On 11 May 1964, Jordan moved to expel Tyndall from the NSM, although the following day Tyndall claimed that, having taken control of the group, he had expelled Jordan. However, soon afterwards Tyndall gave up his NSM membership and, along with most of the staff from the party's London headquarters, left the group. In August 1964, he announced the formation of the Greater Britain Movement and began publishing its magazine, Spearhead, a name taken from the NSM's largely failed attempt to set up a paramilitary wing. The GBM also gained the support of James McIntyre's National Student Front which until that time had been loyal to the NSM. Tyndall would later claim that he had formed the GBM merely as a stopgap to keep his supporters united, stating that he felt, even in 1964, that their future lay in working more closely with other similar groups.

== Policies ==
The first issue of Spearhead stated that the new movement would adhere "without fear and without compromise to every tenet of the national socialist creed" albeit "in a manner more in touch with British affairs and much more in touch with British interests and aims". However whilst leader of the GBM, Tyndall wrote his Six Principles of British Nationalism in which he broke from the Nazism of Jordan, and called for a parliamentary strategy towards a government that would be corporatist, racialist, and based on the principle of leadership. This state would be ratified by regular referendums, although liberal democracy would be brought to an end.

The new movement also advocated laws banning marriage between people of different races and the use of medical procedures to prevent those with "hereditary defects" from having children:

For the protection of British blood, racial laws will be enacted forbidding marriage between Britons and non-Aryans. Medical measures will be taken to prevent procreation on the part of all those who have hereditary defects, either racial, mental, or physical. A pure, strong, healthy British race will be regarded as the principal guarantee of Britain's future.

Tyndall's ideas have been characterised as an attempt to construct a specifically British national socialism, rather than following Jordan's route of simply transplanting the German version. Such was Tyndall's desire to forge a specifically British form of Nazism that he was characterised by Jordan and other critics as a "John Bull in jackboots".

== Development ==
The GBM did not contest any elections and rather became known for publicity stunts and criminal acts. An example of the sort of action they were fond of was provided soon after the group was formed when Tyndall's deputy Martin Webster attempted to assault President of Kenya Jomo Kenyatta, a headline-grabbing stunt that also saw Webster serve a short spell in prison. Tyndall had also been present at the incident, which took place as Kenyatta exited a hotel in London at which he was staying, and Tyndall was given a £25 fine for the abuse he shouted into a megaphone during the attack.

The GBM's policy of provocative street activity meant that it faced frequent opposition. A meeting in the East End of London on 4 October 1964 was attacked by opponents, as was another in Dalston the following October whilst earlier, in August 1965, Tyndall had been shot at five times whilst in the group's headquarters in Norwood. The group's main benefactor was an antiques dealer named Gordon Brown and in late 1966 he gave Tyndall the funds to purchase a small shop in Tulse Hill which Tyndall converted into the Nationalist Centre. The centre welcomed regular visitors from the BNP and League of Empire Loyalists although, according to the BNP's Rodney Legg, some of the older LEL members were appalled by the Nazi ephemera and loaded guns on display.

In January 1965, Tyndall had attempted to make the GBM the leading lights in the World Union of National Socialists but after getting in touch with the American Nazi leader George Lincoln Rockwell Tyndall was dismayed to find that Jordan was still recognised as leader of the body and that the NSM was still the British chapter. The incident helped to push the GBM further away from the neo-Nazi fringe and towards the other groups on the far-right. Removed from the Nazi option and with the GBM individually failing to make much headway or attract much support, Tyndall authorised GBM members to support the campaigns of both the BNP and the LEL as well as the Patriotic Party in March 1965. According to John Bean Tyndall wrote personally to Oswald Mosley, A. K. Chesterton and Bean around the same time suggesting that as their four movements had been co-operating unofficially on activities in support of Rhodesia a more formal alliance between the GBM, Union Movement, LEL and BNP should be agreed upon. Nothing came of these overtures however. Meanwhile, Tyndall had not abandoned his attempts to build links internationally and instead forged an alliance between the GBM and the National States' Rights Party, a far-right group in the United States that had grown critical of Rockwell and the American Nazi Party.

The GBM, however, remained one of the more extreme groups on the far right as was evidenced in 1966 when a number of members were imprisoned for an arson attack on a synagogue, with Tyndall later also jailed for possession of a firearm. The incidents derailed the GBM's drive for unity somewhat as LEL leader A.K. Chesterton was averse to such actions, preferring to maintain a legalist approach. As a result, the GBM undertook negotiations with the BNP and the Racial Preservation Society in early 1966 aimed at effecting a closer union but these came to nothing, with the RPS in particular turning the request down flat.

== Towards merger ==
During the summer of 1966 Tyndall and his movement grew close to A.K. Chesterton and the two soon agreed that the hefty defeat inflicted on the Conservative Party in the 1966 general election had opened up space for a new far right party with Tyndall arguing in Spearhead that there was "no longer any great political force representative of patriotic right-wing principles". Chesterton was impressed by the organisational skills demonstrated by Tyndall in the GBM, although he was also suspicious of his Nazi past whilst Andrew Fountaine was opposed to any GBM membership, and so they did not invite GBM to join the National Front in 1967.

The first issue of Combat, the organ of the British National Party, to be published following the formation of the National Front (which had absorbed the British National Party) specifically stated that the GBM "would not be coming into the new movement and ... their past utterances on anti-Semitism and pro-Nazism would certainly not be a part of National Front policy". However, before the year was out Chesterton relented and allowed the GBM to join the NF 'on probation', leading to the GBM ceasing to exist. In June of that year Tyndall told the GBM membership, which at that point stood at 138, that the movement was disbanded and that they should join the National Front as individuals.
