= John Tyndall (far-right activist) =

British far-right political activist (1934–2005)

- Tyndall addressing a Nationalist Alliance meeting in 2005

Chairman of the British National Party
- In office 7 April 1982 – 27 September 1999
- Deputy: Richard Edmonds
- Preceded by: Party established
- Succeeded by: Nick Griffin

Leader of the Greater Britain Movement
- In office 1964–1967
- Preceded by: Position established
- Succeeded by: Position abolished (absorbed into National Front)

Chairman of the National Front
- In office 1972–1974
- Preceded by: John O'Brien
- Succeeded by: John Kingsley Read
- In office 1976–1980
- Preceded by: John Kingsley Read
- Succeeded by: Andrew Brons

Personal details
- Born: John Hutchyns Tyndall; 14 July 1934 Exeter, Devon, England
- Died: 19 July 2005 (aged 71) Hove, East Sussex, England
- Party: League of Empire Loyalists (1954–1957); National Labour Party (1957–1960); British National Party (1960–1962); National Socialist Movement (1962–1964); Greater Britain Movement (1964–1967); National Front (1967–1980); New National Front (1980–1982); British National Party (1982–2005)
- Spouse: Valerie Dawn Olliff (m. 1977)
- Children: 1

John Hutchyns Tyndall (14 July 1934 – 19 July 2005) was a British neo-fascist political activist. A leading member of various small neo-Nazi groups during the late 1950s and 1960s, he was chairman of the National Front (NF) from 1972 to 1974 and again from 1975 to 1980, and then chairman of the British National Party (BNP) from 1982 to 1999. He unsuccessfully stood for election to the House of Commons and European Parliament on several occasions.

Born in Devon and educated in Kent, Tyndall undertook national service prior to embracing the extreme right. In the mid-1950s, he joined the League of Empire Loyalists (LEL) and came under the influence of its leader, Arthur Chesterton. Finding the LEL too moderate, in 1957 he and John Bean founded the National Labour Party (NLP), an explicitly Nazi group. In 1960, the NLP merged with Colin Jordan's White Defence League to found the first British National Party (BNP). Within the BNP, Tyndall and Jordan established a paramilitary wing called Spearhead, which angered Bean and other party members. They expelled Tyndall and Jordan, who went on to establish the National Socialist Movement and then the international World Union of National Socialists. In 1962, they were convicted and briefly imprisoned for their paramilitary activities. After a split with Jordan, Tyndall formed his Greater Britain Movement (GBM) in 1964. Although never changing his basic beliefs, by the mid-1960s, Tyndall was replacing his overt references to Nazism with appeals to British nationalism.

In 1967, Tyndall joined Chesterton's newly founded National Front (NF) and became its leader in 1972, overseeing growing membership and electoral growth. His leadership was threatened by various factions within the party which eventually led to his losing his position as leader in 1974. He resumed this position in 1975, although the latter part of the 1970s saw the party's prospects decline. Following an argument with long-term comrade Martin Webster, Tyndall resigned from the party in 1980 and formed his short-lived New National Front (NNF). In 1982, he merged the NNF into his own newly formed British National Party (BNP). Under Tyndall, the BNP established itself as the UK's most prominent extreme-right group during the 1980s, although electoral success eluded it. Tyndall's refusal to moderate the BNP's policies or image caused anger among a growing array of "modernisers" in the party, who ousted him in favour of Nick Griffin in 1999. In 2005, Tyndall was charged with incitement to racial hatred for comments made at a BNP meeting. He died two days before his trial was due to take place.

Tyndall promoted a racial nationalist belief in a distinct white "British race", arguing that this race was threatened by a Jewish conspiracy to encourage non-white migration into Britain. He called for the establishment of an authoritarian state which would deport all non-whites from the country, engage in a eugenics project, and re-establish the British Empire through the military conquest of parts of Africa. He never gained any mainstream political respectability in the United Kingdom although he proved popular among sectors of the British far-right.

== Early life ==
=== 1934–1958: Youth ===
John Tyndall was born in Stork Nest, Topsham Road in Exeter, Devon, on 14 July 1934, the son of Nellie Tyndall, née Parker and George Francis Tyndall. Through the Tyndall family line, he was related to the early English translator of the Bible, William Tyndale and the physicist John Tyndall. His paternal family were Irish Unionists from County Waterford, who had a long history of service in the Royal Irish Constabulary. His grandfather had been a district inspector in the Constabulary and he had also fought against the Irish Republican Army during the Irish War of Independence. His father had moved to England, working as a Metropolitan Police officer, and then he worked as a warden at YMCA hostels, including at St George's House on Stockwell Road in Southwark. Tyndall later stated that despite the fact that his father had been raised in a Unionist family, he eventually adopted internationalist views. He claimed that his mother exhibited "a kind of basic British patriotism" and he also claimed that it was she who shaped his early political views. His upbringing was emotionally stable and materially secure. Tyndall studied at the Beckenham and Penge Grammar School in west Kent, where he attained three O-levels, a "moderate" result. At the school, his achievements had been sporting rather than academic, because he enjoyed playing cricket and association football and he also developed a passion for fitness.

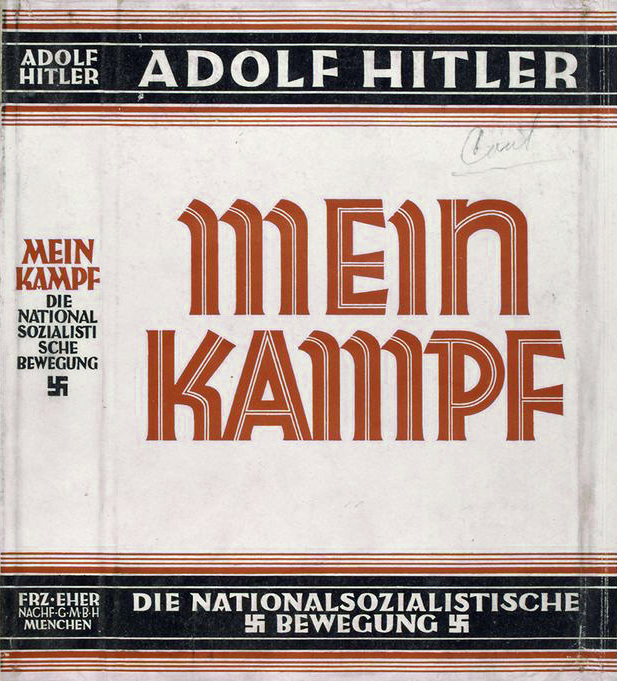
In his youth, Tyndall read and was influenced by Adolf Hitler's Mein Kampf.

Tyndall completed his national service in West Germany from 1952 to 1954. A member of the Royal Horse Artillery, he achieved the rank of lance-bombardier. On completion, he returned to Britain and turned his attention to political issues. Initially interested in socialism, he attended the 6th World Festival of Youth and Students which was held in Moscow, the capital city of the Soviet Union, in 1957. Nevertheless, he began to believe that left-wing politics was being infused with "anti-British attitudes", moving swiftly to the political right. He was devoted to the preservation of the British Empire and he was hostile to what he believed was the growing permissiveness of British society, stating that "the smell everywhere was one of decadence". During that decade he read Mein Kampf, the autobiography and political manifesto of the Nazi Party leader Adolf Hitler, growing sympathetic to Hitler's political beliefs and Nazism. In particular, Tyndall approved of "the descriptions of the workings of certain Jewish forces in Germany, which seemed uncannily similar to what I had observed of the same kinds of forces in Britain." He concluded that Britain's decision to go to war against Nazi Germany was ultimately the result of a conspiracy which was primarily headed by Jews, a conspiracy which he thought had also masterminded non-white immigration to Britain after the war.

Around 1957–58, Tyndall decided to commit himself to his political cause full-time, which he was able to do because his job as a salesman allowed him to keep flexible working hours. He decided against joining the Union Movement which was led by the prominent British fascist Oswald Mosley, disagreeing with its promotion of the political union of Britain with continental Europe. Instead, he was attracted to the League of Empire Loyalists (LEL) – a right-wing group founded by Arthur Chesterton – after seeing coverage of one of their demonstrations on television. He visited their basement office in Westminster, where he was given some of their literature. He enjoyed Chesterton's writings and concurred with his conspiracy theory that Jewish people had been plotting to bring down the British Empire. Tyndall began associating with other young men who had joined the LEL. At a February 1957 by-election in Lewisham North, Tyndall aided the LEL campaign, during which he met another party member, John Bean, an industrial chemist. Both Tyndall and Bean were frustrated by the LEL's attempts to exert pressure on the mainstream Conservative Party. They wanted to be involved in a more radical party, one that would combine "nationalism" with "popular socialism" and which would reach out to the white working class through appeals against immigration from the Caribbean.

=== 1958–1962: National Labour Party and the first British National Party ===
By his systematic attack on all European culture the Jew is polluting and destroying the European soul ... If the European soul is to be recovered in our country and throughout Europe, it can only be by the elimination of this cankerous microbe in our midst.

— Tyndall's views on Jews, published in the NLP journal

In April 1958, Tyndall and Bean founded their own extreme-right group, the National Labour Party (NLP). The group was based at Thornton Heath, Croydon and attracted its early membership from former LEL members living in south and east London. According to the historian Richard Thurlow, the NLP promoted an "English" variant of Nazism and was more pronounced in its "explicit racism" than the LEL had been, focusing less on bemoaning the decline of the British Empire and more on criticising the arrival of non-white immigrants from former British colonies.

The NLP began co-operating with another extreme-right group, the White Defence League, which had been established by Colin Jordan, a secondary school teacher. Together the two groups embarked on a project of stirring up racial tensions among white Britons and black Caribbean immigrants in Notting Hill. Tyndall briefly left the NLP and in his absence Bean and Jordan merged their respective groups into the British National Party (BNP) in 1960. The BNP were racial nationalists, calling for the preservation of a "Nordic race"—of which the "British race" was considered a branch—by removing both immigrants and Jewish influences from Britain. Tyndall soon joined this new BNP, and became a close confidante of Jordan, who helped Tyndall to further embrace neo-Nazism. Tyndall also developed a friendship with Martin Webster, who became a long-term comrade after watching Tyndall speak at a Trafalgar Square rally in 1962.

In April 1961, Tyndall self-published his pamphlet, The Authoritarian State: Its Meaning and Function, which helped to cement his reputation within the British far-right. In the pamphlet, he attacked democratic systems of government as part of a conspiracy orchestrated by Jews, quoting from the anti-Semitic hoax and forgery The Protocols of the Elders of Zion. It called for the replacement of the United Kingdom's liberal democratic system with an authoritarian one in which a "Leader" is given absolute power.

Within the BNP, Tyndall established an elite group known as Spearhead, members of which wore military-style uniforms inspired by those of the Nazis and underwent paramilitary and ideological training. Tyndall had a great liking for wearing jackboots – Jordan related that on the way to a far-right meeting in Germany, Tyndall made his entourage look for a shoe shop so that he could purchase a pair of genuine German jackboots. It is likely that there were no more than 60 members of Spearhead. The group campaigned on behalf of imprisoned Nazi war criminals Rudolf Hess and Adolf Eichmann. According to the anti-fascist activist Gerry Gable, Spearhead represented the first "terrorist group" founded by neo-Nazis in Britain. Both Bean and another senior BNP member, Andrew Fountaine, were concerned about the overt neo-Nazism embraced by Tyndall and Jordan, instead thinking that the BNP should articulate a more British-oriented form of racial nationalism. In 1962, Bean held a meeting at which Tyndall and Jordan were expelled from the party.

=== 1962–1967: National Socialist Movement and Greater Britain Movement ===
Tyndall and Jordan then regrouped around twenty members of Spearhead and formed the National Socialist Movement (NSM) on 20 April 1962, a date symbolically chosen as Hitler's birthday. They celebrated the event with a cake decorated with a Nazi swastika. According to the historian Richard Thurlow, the NSM was "the most blatant Nazi" group active in Britain during the mid-20th century. The NSM gained few members; an estimate in August 1962 suggested that it had only thirty to fifty. The NSM gained the attention of the media as well as Special Branch. In July 1962, Tyndall was arrested for breaching the peace at a Trafalgar Square rally in which he had been attacked by Jewish military veterans and other anti-fascists after calling the Jewish community a "poisonous maggot feeding on a body in an advanced state of decay". His comments resulted in him being convicted of inciting racial hatred and he was sentenced to six weeks imprisonment, reduced to a fine on appeal. The police then raided the group's London headquarters, after which its leading members were brought to trial at the Old Bailey, where they were found guilty of establishing a paramilitary group in contravention of Section Two of the Public Order Act 1936. Tyndall received a six-month prison sentence, while Jordan received nine months.

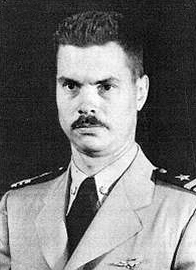
Tyndall was one of the British neo-Nazis who established links with their American counterpart George Lincoln Rockwell (pictured).

Although the British authorities had prohibited the American neo-Nazi George Lincoln Rockwell from entering the UK, the NSM managed to smuggle him in via Ireland to attend a summer camp in August 1962. There, the NSM took part in the formation of the World Union of National Socialists (WUNS), at which Jordan was elected 'world führer' and Rockwell as his heir. Among those in attendance were the neo-Nazi Savitri Devi and the former SS officer Fred Borth.

Jordan had been courting the French socialite Françoise Dior, but while he had been imprisoned, she entered a relationship with Tyndall and they were engaged to be married. On Jordan's release, Dior left Tyndall and instead married Jordan in October 1963. This contributed to a growing personal feud between the two men, with Jordan accusing Tyndall and Webster of making obscene phone calls to Dior. Tyndall was also angry at what he perceived as Jordan's deviation from orthodox Nazi thought and by the fact that Jordan's relationship with Dior had been attracting negative sensationalist press attention for the NSM. In the spring of 1964 Tyndall and Webster tried to oust Jordan as the head of the NSM but failed. In later years Tyndall expressed the view that his involvement in the NSM had been a "profound mistake", arguing that then he "still had a lot to learn" and that "when one sees one's nation and people in danger there is less dishonour in acting and acting wrongly than in not acting at all."

Now based in Battersea, Tyndall left Jordan and the NSM and formed his own rival, the Greater Britain Movement (GBM). According to Tyndall, "the Greater Britain Movement will uphold and preach pure National Socialism". According to the political scientist Stan Taylor, the GBM reflected Tyndall's desire for "a specifically British variant of National Socialism". It called for the criminalisation of sexual relations and marriages between white Britons and non-whites and called for the sterilisation of those it deemed unfit to reproduce. The group established its base in a run-down building in Notting Hill, with swastikas being sprayed onto the exterior and an image of Hitler decorating the interior. Tyndall tried to convince the WUNS to accept his GBM as its British representative, but Rockwell—concerned not to encourage schismatic dissenters in his own American Nazi Party—sided with Jordan and the NSM. Tyndall then established contact with Rockwell's main rival in the American neo-Nazi scene, the National States' Rights Party.

Tyndall formed a publishing company, Albion Press, and launched a new magazine which he titled Spearhead after his former paramilitary group. Spearhead initially labelled itself "an organ of National Socialist opinion in Britain" and described Nazi Germany as "one of the greatest social experiments of our century". According to the historian Alan Sykes, this magazine became "increasingly influential" in the British far-right. The magazine advertised portraits of Hitler and swastika badges for sale. Much of the material that Tyndall wrote for the journal was less openly neo-Nazi and extreme than his previous writings, something which may have resulted from caution surrounding the Race Relations Act 1965. The GBM engaged in several stunts to raise publicity; in 1964 for instance Webster assaulted the Kenyan leader Jomo Kenyatta outside his London hotel while Tyndall hurled insults at him through a loudspeaker. In 1965, the group staged a shooting incident at its Norwood headquarters, claiming that it had been an attack by anti-fascists. In another instance they distributed stickers emblazoned with a portrait of Hitler and the slogan "he was right". In 1966, several GBM members were arrested for carrying out arson attacks against synagogues.

== Later career ==
=== 1967–1980: National Front ===
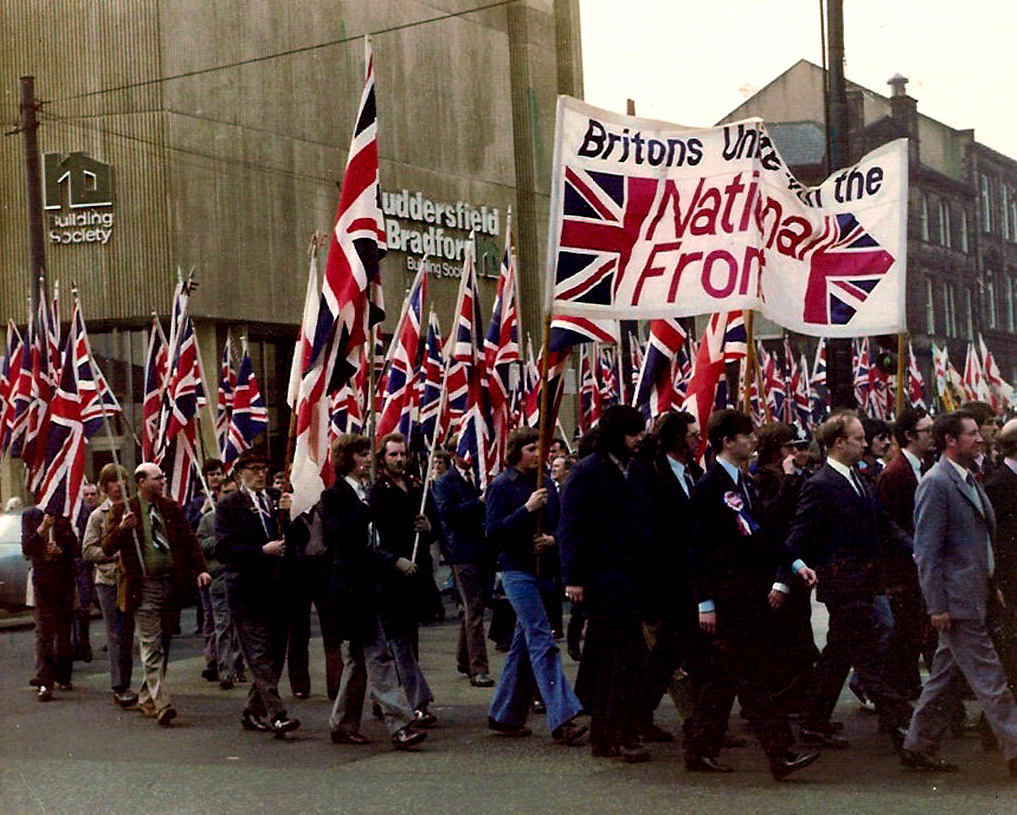
A National Front (NF) march during the 1970s, the precursor movement from which the British National Party (BNP) emerged by 1982

In the mid-1960s, there were five extreme-right groups operating in Britain and Tyndall believed that they could achieve more if they united. To that end, Spearhead abandoned its open affiliation with neo-Nazism in 1966. That year, Tyndall issued a pamphlet titled Six Principles of British Nationalism which made no mention of neo-Nazism or Jewish conspiracies. It also dropped the insistence on armed takeovers present in his earlier thought, acknowledging the possibility that extreme-right nationalists could gain power through the British electoral process. Chesterton read the pamphlet and was impressed, entering into talks with Tyndall's GBM about a potential merger of their respective organisations. Independently, Chesterton had also been discussing the issue of a unification with Bean's BNP. This proved successful, as the LEL and BNP merged to form the National Front (NF) in 1967. According to Thurlow, the formation of the NF was "the most significant event on the radical right and fascist fringe of British politics" since the internment of the country's fascists during the Second World War.

The new NF initially excluded Tyndall and his GBM from joining, concerned that he might seek to mould it in a specifically neo-Nazi direction, although they soon agreed to allow both him and other GBM members to join on probation. On entering, the former GBM soon became the most influential faction within the NF, with many of its members rapidly rising to positions of influence. Tyndall became the party's vice chairman and remained loyal to Chesterton, who was the party's first chairman, for instance by supporting him when several members of the party directorate rebelled against his leadership in 1970. Although remaining Tyndall's private property, Spearhead became the de facto monthly magazine of the NF. Chesterton resigned as chairman in 1970 and was replaced by the Powellite John O'Brien. In 1972, O'Brien and eight other members of the party's directorate resigned in protest at Tyndall's links to neo-Nazi groups in Germany. This allowed Tyndall to take control as party chairman in 1972.

According to Thurlow, under Tyndall the NF represented "an attempt to portray the essentials of Nazi ideology in more rational language and seemingly reasonable arguments", functioning as an attempt to "convert racial populists" angry about immigration "into fascists". Capitalising on anger surrounding the arrival of Ugandan Asian migrants in the country in 1972, Tyndall oversaw the NF during the period of its largest growth. Membership of the party doubled between October 1972 and June 1973, possibly reaching as high as 17,500. Relations had apparently warmed between Tyndall and Jordan, for they met up after the latter was released from prison in 1968, and Tyndall again met with Jordan in Coventry in 1972 and invited him to join the NF. A poor showing in the February 1974 general election resulted in Tyndall being challenged by two groups within the party, the 'Strasserites' and the 'Populists', the latter of whom were largely Powellite ex-members of the Conservative Party. The Populist challenge was successful and in October 1974 Tyndall was replaced as chairman by John Kingsley Read. Tyndall then used Spearhead as a vehicle to criticise rival factions with the NF. As a result, he was expelled from the party during a disciplinary tribunal in November 1975. Tyndall took the issue to the high court, who overturned the expulsion. The 'Populists' then left the party, splitting to form the National Party in January 1976, which for a short time proved more electorally successful than the NF. Back in the party and with his main rivals gone, Tyndall regained the position of chairman.

I do not believe that the survival of the white man will be found through the crest of political respectability because I believe that respectability today means one thing, it means your preparedness to be a lackey of the establishment ... I don't want respectability if that is what respectability means, preparedness to surrender my own race, to hell with respectability if that is what it is.

— Tyndall's views on electoral 'respectability'

Encouraged by Webster and new confidante Richard Verrall, in the mid-1970s Tyndall returned to his openly hardline approach of promoting biological racist and antisemitic ideas. This did not help the NF's electoral prospects. In the 1979 general election, the NF mounted the largest challenge of any insurgent party since the Labour Party in 1918, with 303 candidates. Among them were Tyndall's wife, mother-in-law and father-in-law. Tyndall stood in Hackney South and Shoreditch, securing 7.6%; this was the Front's best result that election, but was down from the 9.4% they had gained in that constituency in October 1974. In the election, the NF "flopped dismally", securing only 1.3% of the total vote, down from 3.1% in October 1974. This decline may have been due to the increased anti-fascist campaigning of the previous few years, or because the Conservative Party under Margaret Thatcher had adopted an increasingly tough stance on immigration which attracted many of the votes that had previously gone to the NF. NF membership had also declined and by 1979 had fallen to approximately 5,000. Tyndall nevertheless refused to dilute or moderate his party's policies, stating that to do so would be the "naïve chasing of moonbeams". In November 1979, Fountaine unsuccessfully tried to oust Tyndall as leader, subsequently establishing the National Front Constitutional Movement.

Tyndall had grown distant from Webster over their differences and in the late 1970s began blaming him for the party's problems. Webster had for instance disagreed with Tyndall's support for Chesterton's leadership, while Tyndall was upset with Webster's attempts to encourage more skinheads and football hooligans to join the party. Tyndall in particular began criticizing the fact that Webster was a homosexual, emphasising allegations that Webster had been making sexual advances toward young men in the party. More widely, he complained about a "homosexual network" among leading NF members. In October 1979, he called a meeting of the NF directorate at which he urged them to call for Webster's resignation. At the meeting, Webster apologised for his conduct and the directorate stood by him against Tyndall. Angered, Tyndall then tried convincing the directorate to grant him greater powers in his position as chairman, but they refused. Tyndall resigned in January 1980, subsequently referring to the party as the "gay National Front".

In June 1980, Tyndall founded the New National Front (NNF). The NNF claimed that a third of the NF's membership defected to join them. Tyndall stated that "I have one wish in this operation and one wish alone, to cleanse the National Front of the foul stench of perversion which has politically crippled it". As his choice of party name suggested, he remained hopeful that his breakaway group could eventually be re-merged back into the NF. There developed a great rivalry between the two groups, and as the NF's new leadership moved it away from the Tyndallite approach, Tyndall realised that he may never have the opportunity to regain his position within it.

=== 1981–1989: Establishing the British National Party ===
John Tyndall was both [the BNPs] greatest asset and its greatest drawback. His persistence, rock-like reliability and leadership had kept the movement going, but with almost imperceptible growth since its 1982 foundation.

— John Bean

In January 1981, Tyndall was contacted by far-right activist Ray Hill, who had become an informant for the anti-fascist magazine Searchlight. Hill suggested that Tyndall establish a new political party through which he could unite many smaller extreme-right groups. While Hill's real intention had been to cause a further schism among the British far-right and thus weaken it, Tyndall deemed his suggestion to be a good idea. Tyndall made suggestions of unity to a number of other small extreme-right groups and together they established a Committee for Nationalist Unity (CNU) in January 1982.

In March 1982 the CNU held a conference at Charing Cross Hotel in central London and while the NF officially refused to send a delegation, several NF members did attend. The fifty extreme-rightists in attendance agreed that they would establish a new political party, to be known as the British National Party (BNP). According to Tyndall, "The BNP is a racial nationalist party which believes in Britain for the British, that is to say racial separatism." Under Tyndall's leadership, in 1982 the BNP issued its first policy on immigration as "immigration into Britain by non-Europeans ... should be terminated forthwith and we should organise a massive programme of repatriation and resettlement overseas of those peoples of non-European origin already resident in this country."

Tyndall was to be the leader of this new party, with the majority of its members coming from the NNF, although others were defectors from the NF, British Movement, British Democratic Party and Nationalist Party. The party was formally launched at a press conference held in a Victoria hotel on 7 April 1982. At the conference, Tyndall described the BNP as the "SDP of the far right", thereby referencing the recent growth of the centrist Social Democratic Party. The historian Nigel Copsey has noted that while the BNP under Tyndall could be described as "Neo-Nazi", it was not "crudely mimetic" of the original German Nazism. Its stated policy objectives were identical to those that the NF had had under Tyndall's leadership in the 1970s. But its constitution was very different. Whereas the NF had a directorate which helped to guide the direction of the party and could replace the leader, Tyndall's new BNP gave full executive powers to the chairman. Tyndall ran the BNP from his home, "Seacroft", in Hove, East Sussex, and he rarely left the county. In 1986 Tyndall was convicted of inciting racial hatred and sentenced to a year's imprisonment; he served only four months before his release. In 1987, the BNP opened discussions with an NF faction, the National Front Support Group (NFSG), to discuss the possibility of a merger, but the NFSG decided against it, remaining cautious about Tyndall's total domination of the BNP.

By 1988, Searchlight reported that the party's membership had declined to around 1,000. Tyndall responded by trying to raise finances, calling for greater sales of their newspaper and increasing the price of membership by 50%. He also promised that he would make the BNP the largest extreme-right group in the UK and that he would establish a professional headquarters for the party. This was achieved in 1989, as a party headquarters was opened in Welling, Southeast London, an area chosen because it was a recipient of significant 'white flight' from inner London. That year also witnessed the BNP become the most prominent force on the British far-right as the NF collapsed amid internal arguments and schisms.

=== 1990–1999: Growth of the British National Party ===
In the early 1990s, a paramilitary group known as Combat 18 (C18) was formed to protect BNP events from anti-fascist protesters. Tyndall was displeased that by 1992, C18 was having an increased influence over the BNP's street activities. Relations between the groups deteriorated such that by August 1993, activists from the BNP and C18 were physically fighting each other. In December 1993, Tyndall issued a bulletin to BNP branches declaring C18 to be a proscribed organisation, furthermore suggesting that it may have been established by agents of the state to discredit the party. To counter C18's influence, he secured the American white nationalist militant William Pierce as a guest speaker at the BNP's annual rally in November 1995.

Immigration into Britain by non-Europeans ... should be terminated forthwith and we should organise a massive programme of repatriation and resettlement overseas of those peoples of non-European origin already resident in this country.

— The BNP's first policy on repatriation, 1982

Tyndall had observed the electoral success achieved by Jean-Marie Le Pen and the French National Front during the 1980s and hoped that by learning from their activities he could improve the BNP's electoral prospects. He saw the issue as being one of credibility among the electorate, declaring that "we should be looking for ways to overcome our present image of weakness and smallness". He ignored the significant impact that had been achieved by the French NF through moderating its policies and thereby gaining greater respectability among the electorate. While Tyndall had sought to keep skinheads and football hooligans out of the BNP, he still kept a range of Holocaust deniers and convicted criminals close to him. He expressed the view that "we should not be looking for ways of applying ideological cosmetic surgery to ourselves in order to make our features more appealing to our public". Conversely, in the early 1990s a 'moderniser' faction emerged in the party that favoured a more electorally palatable strategy and an emphasis on building grassroots support to win local elections. They were impressed by Le Pen's move to disassociate his party from biological racism and focus on the perceived cultural incompatibility of different racial groups. Tyndall opposed many of the modernisers' ideas and sought to stem their growing influence in the party,

In the 1992 general election, the party stood 13 candidates. Tyndall stood in Bow and Poplar, gaining 3% of the vote. In a council by-election in September 1993, the BNP gained one council seat—won by Derek Beackon in the East London neighbourhood of Millwall—after a campaign that targeted the anger of local whites over the perceived preferential treatment received by Bangladeshi migrants in social housing. At the time Tyndall described this as the BNP's "moment in history", deeming it a sign that the party was entering the political mainstream. Following an anti-BNP campaign launched by anti-fascist and local religious groups it lost its Millwall seat during the 1994 local elections.

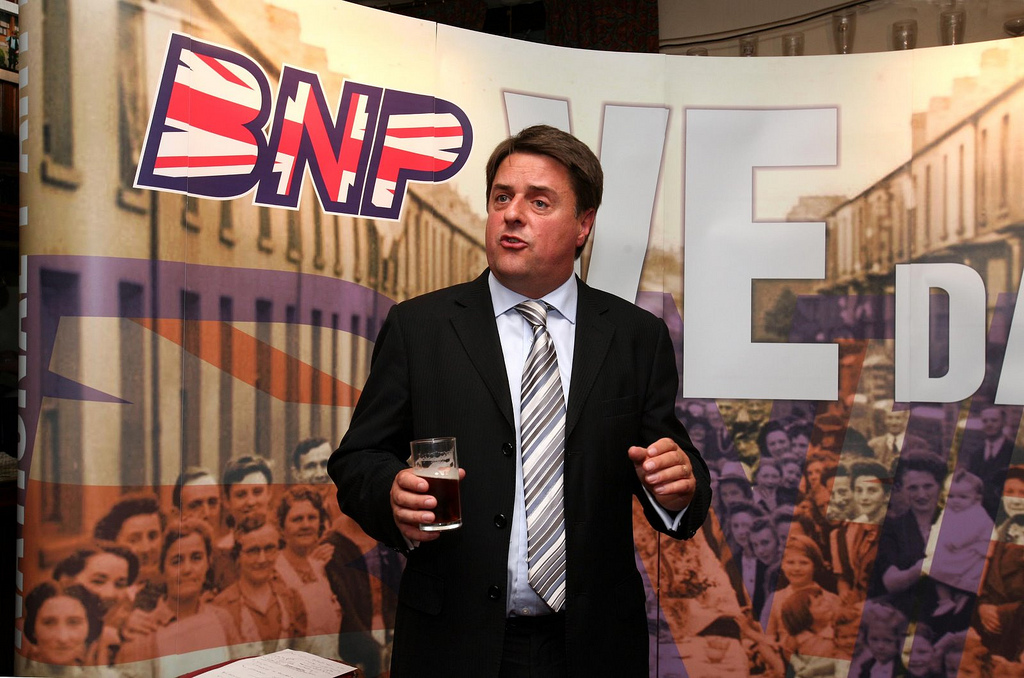
In 1999, Tyndall was replaced as BNP chairman by Nick Griffin (pictured at a BNP press conference in 2009).

Tyndall stood as the BNP candidate in the 1994 Dagenham by-election, in which he gained 9% of the vote and had his electoral deposit returned. This was the first time that an extreme right candidate had retained their deposit since Webster's 1973 showing for the NF in West Bromwich. In the 1997 general election, the party stood over fifty candidates. Tyndall stood in the East London constituency of Poplar and Canning Town, where he received 7.26% of the vote. Tyndall was attacked and badly beaten by anti-fascists at an election meeting in Stratford, East London. He was also photographed with the London nail bomber, David Copeland. Tyndall claimed that following the election, the party received between 2,500 and 3,000 enquiries—roughly the same as they had received after the 1983 general election—although far fewer of these enquirers became members. The party was stagnating, and Tyndall's "political career was now on borrowed time".

After the BNP's poor performance at the 1997 general election, opposition to Tyndall's leadership grew. His position was damaged by a lack of financial transparency in the party, with concerns being raised that large donations to the party had been used instead by Tyndall for personal expenses. The modernisers challenged his control of the party, resulting in its first ever leadership election, held in October 1999. Tyndall was challenged by Nick Griffin, who offered an improved administration, financial transparency and greater support for local branches. 80% of party members voted, with two-thirds backing Griffin; Tyndall had secured only 411 votes, representing 30% of the total membership. Tyndall accepted his defeat with equanimity and stood down as chairman. He stated that he would become "an ordinary member", telling his supporters that "we have all got to pull together in the greater cause of race and nation".

=== 1999–2005: Final years ===
Tyndall remained a member of the BNP and continued to support it in the pages of Spearhead. But Griffin sought to restrain Tyndall's ongoing influence in the party, curtailing the distribution of Spearhead among BNP members and instead emphasising his own magazine, Identity, which was established in January 2000. To combat the influence of declining sales, Tyndall established the group 'Friends of Spearhead', whose members were asked to contribute £10 a month.

By 2000, Tyndall was beginning to agitate against Griffin's leadership, criticising the establishment of the party's Ethnic Liaison Committee – which had one half-Turkish member (Lawrence Rustem) – as a move towards admitting non-whites into the party. He was also critical of Griffin's abandonment of the party's idea of compulsory removal of migrants and non-whites from the country, believing that if they stayed in a segregated system then Britain would resemble apartheid-era South Africa, which he did not think was preferable. His main criticisms were focused not on the party's changing direction, but on Griffin's character itself, portraying him as unscrupulous and self-centred. Tyndall was determined to retake control of the party, and in this was supported by a group of party hardliners. During a proposed leadership challenge, Tyndall put forward his name, although withdrew it following the 2001 general election when Griffin led the BNP to a clear growth in electoral support. Tyndall nevertheless believed that the BNP's electoral success had less to do with Griffin's reforms and more to do with external factors such as the 2001 Oldham riots. In turn, Griffin criticised Tyndall in the pages of Identity, claiming that the latter was committed to "the sub-Mosleyite wackiness of Arnold Leese's Imperial Fascist League and the Big Government mania of the 1930s". Griffin expelled Tyndall from the party in August 2003, but had to allow his return following an out-of-court settlement shortly after.

Tyndall gave a speech at a BNP event in which he claimed that Asians and Africans had only produced "black magic, witchcraft, voodoo, cannibalism and Aids", also attacking the Jewish leader of the Conservative Party, Michael Howard, as an "interloper, this immigrant or son of immigrants, who has no roots at all in Britain". The speech was filmed by undercover investigator Jason Gwynne and included in a 2004 BBC documentary, The Secret Agent. On 12 December 2004, these comments resulted in Tyndall being arrested on suspicion of incitement to racial hatred. That month, Tyndall was again expelled from the BNP, this time permanently. The police then charged him, although he was granted unconditional bail in April 2005. Tyndall died of heart failure at his flat—52 Westbourne Villas in Hove—on 19 July 2005. He had been due to stand trial at Leeds Magistrates' Court two days later. He was survived by his wife and his daughter, Marina.

== Policies and views ==
Deep fascist roots, including indigenous [i.e. British] ones, had nourished Tyndall's political psyche. His political career, spanning over 40 years, saw him pass through a labyrinthine array of right-extreme organisations. Moreover, regardless of some cosmetic changes, his ideology had remained the same from start to finish.

— Historian Nigel Copsey, 2008

Tyndall has been described as a racial nationalist, and a British nationalist, as well as a fascist, neo-fascist, and a neo-Nazi. Tyndall adhered to neo-Nazism during the 1960s, although from the 1970s onward he increasingly concealed this behind the rhetoric of "British patriotism". According to Thurlow, this was because by this time Tyndall had realised that "open Nazism was counter-productive" to his cause. This was in accordance with a wider trend among Britain's far-right to avoid the term "British fascism", with its electorally unpalatable connotations and instead refer to "British nationalism" in its public appeals. Sykes stated that Tyndall split with Jordan because—in contrast to the latter's neo-Nazi focus on pan-'Aryan' unity—he "thought more traditionally in terms of British nationalism, the British race and the British Empire". Jordan himself accused Tyndall of being "an extreme Tory imperialist, a John Bull, unable to recognise the call of race beyond Britain's frontiers".

Tyndall later described his membership of these openly neo-Nazi groups as a "youthful indiscretion". He expressed the view that while he regretted his involvement in them, he was not ashamed of having done so: "though some of my former beliefs were mistaken, I will never acknowledge that there was anything dishonourable about holding them." As leader of the NF he continued to openly approve of Hitler's social and economic programmes, as well as his policies of German territorial expansion. In his 1988 autobiography The Eleventh Hour, he stated that while he thought that "many of [Hitler's] intentions were good ones and many of his achievements admirable", he did not think "that it is right for a British movement belonging to an entirely different phase of history to model itself on the movement of Hitler".

From open Hitler worship and barely disguised expression of such ideas in the National Socialist Movement, through the 'English' form of national socialism [i.e. Nazism] in the Greater British Movement, to the expression of such sentiments clothed in apparently respectable form in the National Front, Tyndall was to retain the basic extremist views which had always characterised his thought.

— Historian Richard Thurlow, 1987

Following this shift away from overt allegiance to Nazism, Tyndall's supporters and detractors continued to dispute whether he remained a convinced Nazi. Academic commentators consider that his basic ideological world-view did not change. In 1981, Nigel Fielding stated that while Tyndall's views had "moderated remarkably", in the NF he had still "preserve[d] and defend[ed]" "those traits which were the hallmark" of earlier neo-Nazi groups. Walker noted that in October 1975 Tyndall wrote articles for Spearhead which had clearly "returned to the language and ideology of the Nazi days", and that another article printed the previous month was "pure Nazism in that it reflects exactly the mood and spirit of Mein Kampf". The historian Nicholas Goodrick-Clarke stated that Tyndall simply "cloaked his former extremism in British nationalism", while the journalist Daniel Trilling commented that "Tyndall's claim to have moderated his views was merely expedient". On his death, The Guardian stated that Tyndall had remained "a racist, violent neo-Nazi to the end", while Trilling described Tyndall as having had "a long pedigree in the most extreme and violent quarters of Britain's far right".

The political scientist Nigel Copsey believed that Chesterton had been the "seminal influence" on Tyndall's thought. Thurlow disagreed, arguing that Tyndall had been influenced less by Chesterton and Mosley and more by a third figure in Britain's "fascist tradition", Arnold Leese. Thurlow noted that Tyndall adopted Leese's "political intransigence… his refusal to compromise with political reality and his willingness to martyr himself for his beliefs". According to Trilling, the "two guiding stars in ... Tyndall's political universe" were Hitler and the British Empire. In contrast to many of his contemporaries in the British far-right, Tyndall was "thoroughly indifferent" to the ideas of the Nouvelle Droite, a French extreme-right movement which had emerged in the 1960s. Whereas the Nouvelle Droite sought to move away from the approach adopted by the fascist movements of the 1930s and 1940s, Tyndall remained wedded to white racial nationalism, anti-Semitic conspiracy theories and nostalgia for the British Empire, all approaches generally repudiated by the Nouvelle Droite.

=== Race and nationalism ===
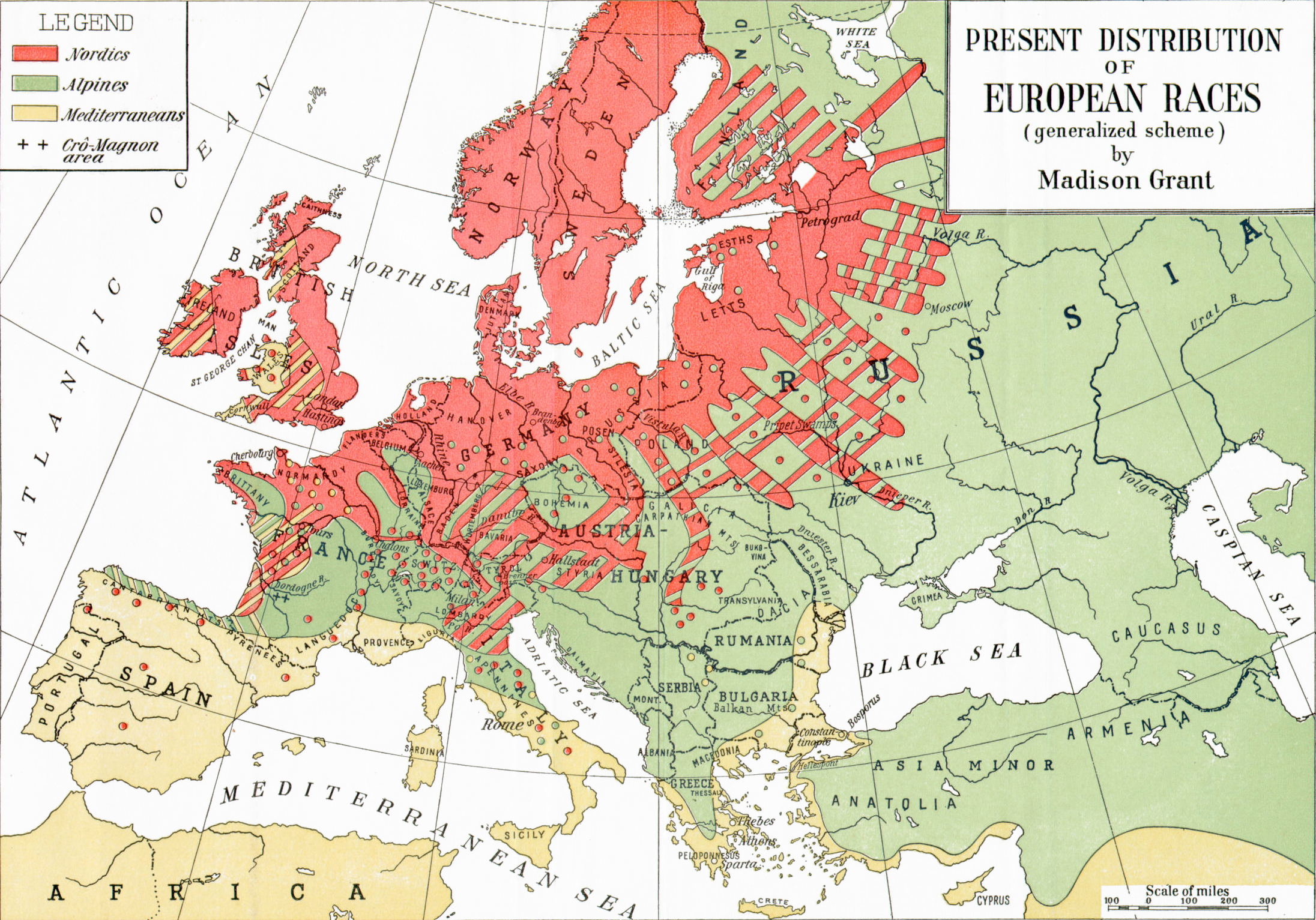
Tyndall believed that there was a 'British race' that was part of a wider 'Nordic race' (distribution depicted in red in this 1916 map by Madison Grant).

Tyndall had "deeply entrenched" biologically racist views, akin to those of earlier fascists like Hitler and Leese. He believed that there was a biologically distinct white-skinned "British race" which was one branch of a wider Nordic race. Tyndall was of the view that race defined a nation and that "if that is lost we will have no nation in the future." He believed the Nordic race to be superior to others, and under his leadership, the BNP promoted a variety of pseudoscientific claims in support of white supremacy. Those parties he controlled restricted membership to people of Northern European ethnic heritage.

Over the course of his career in far-right politics, Tyndall became less outspoken on race after his prosecution under the Race Relations Act. In the mid-1970s, Tyndall used Spearhead to claim that "the negro has a smaller brain and a much less complex cerebral structure" than white Europeans. In 1988, Tyndall described his crime as having "dared to publish an honest and frank opinion on the relative merits of Whites and Negroes". Tyndall argued that non-whites were unassimilable to Britain and that those living in Britain should be repatriated. Tyndall strongly objected to interracial relationships and miscegenation and remarked in his book The Eleventh Hour: "I feel deeply sorry for the child of a mixed marriage, but I can have no sympathy whatever for the parents ... They produced an offspring that will never wholly fit and will undoubtedly face a life much harder than the normal person born of pure race." In contrast to his views on non-white migration, he spoke positively of white immigrants from Ireland, Poland, Hungary and the Baltic states, regarding them as being racially similar and sharing the "same basic culture" as the British and were thus easily able to assimilate "within a generation or two".

My experience as a campaigner against the multi-racial idea in Britain and in favour of our country's centuries-old tradition of racial homogeneity has brought home to me beyond any doubt the fact that Jews are to be found at the forefront of opposition to British racial self-preservation.

— Tyndall's belief that Jews were behind multiracial Britain

Tyndall was antisemitic. From earlier fascists like Chesterton, he had inherited a belief that there was a global conspiracy of Jews bent on world domination, opining that The Protocols of the Elders of Zion (known since the 1920s to be a forgery) was genuine evidence for this. He believed that Jews were responsible for both communism and international finance capitalism, using both to their own ends and that they were responsible for undermining the British Empire and the British race. Tyndall also believed that both democratic government and immigration into Europe were parts of a Jewish conspiracy to weaken other races. In an early edition of Spearhead, he had expressed the view that "if Britain were to become Jew-clean she would have no nigger neighbours to worry about ... It is the Jews who are our misfortune: T-h-e J-e-w-s. Do you hear me? THE JEWS?" Another of his comments, made in 1963, was that "Jewry is a world pest wherever it is found in the world today. The Jews are more clever and more financially powerful than other people and have to be eradicated before they destroy the Aryan peoples".

Tyndall also engaged in Holocaust denial, declaring that the Holocaust was a hoax created by Jews to gain sympathy for themselves and thus aid their plot for world domination. In The Eleventh Hour, Tyndall spoke approvingly of Holocaust denier David Irving. In promoting Holocaust denial, Tyndall and those close to him sought to rehabilitate Hitler and the Nazi government in the British public's view.

=== Governance ===
In the early 1960s, Tyndall espoused the idea of replacing Britain's liberal democratic government—which he regarded as a front for the Jewish world conspiracy—with an authoritarian system that he believed would be free of Jewish influence. Between 1961 and 1966 there was a shift in Tyndall's publicly espoused views. This focused largely on his beliefs about the structure of an ideal government for—while not rejecting the idea of an authoritarian dictatorship altogether—he placed greater emphasis on the need for the government to be more acceptable to the population. Rather than self-describing himself as an authoritarian, by the mid-1960s he was accusing the country's mainstream parties (and the "liberal minority" whom he alleged ran them) of being the real authoritarians, thus portraying himself as a champion of democracy. In this he presented his arguments in a populist manner.

Tyndall believed that liberal democracy was damaging to British society, claiming that liberalism was a "doctrine of decay and degeneration". Under Tyndall, the NF and BNP sought to dismantle the UK's liberal democratic system of parliamentary governance, although both groups were vague about what they sought to replace this system with. In his 1988 work The Eleventh Hour, Tyndall wrote of the need for "an utter rejection of liberalism and a dedication to the resurgence of authority". Tyndall's BNP perceived itself as a revolutionary force that would bring about a national rebirth in Britain, entailing a radical transformation of society. It proposed a state in which the prime minister would have full executive powers and would be elected directly by the population for an indefinite period of time. This prime minister could be dismissed from office in a further election that could be called if Parliament passed a vote of no confidence. It stated that rather than having any political parties, candidates standing for election to the parliament would be independent.

Tyndall described his approach to the economy as "National Economics", expressing the view that "politics must lead and not be led by, economic forces". His approach rejected economic liberalism because it did not serve "the national interest", although still saw advantages in a capitalist system, looking favourably on individual enterprise. He called on capitalist elements to be combined with socialist ones, with the government playing a role in planning the economy. He promoted the idea of the UK becoming an autarky which was economically self-sufficient, with domestic production protected from foreign competition. This attitude was heavily informed by the corporatist system that had been introduced in Benito Mussolini's Fascist Italy.

Under Tyndall, the NF alleged that internationalist institutions and organisations were part of the global Jewish conspiracy. Under Tyndall's leadership, the BNP had overt anti-Europeanist tendencies, and throughout the 1980s and 1990s he maintained the party's opposition to the European Economic Community. Arguing that Britain should establish a White Commonwealth bloc, Tyndall called for a better relationship with South Africa and Rhodesia (each then ruled by a white minority), and urged those nations to permanently retain their systems of racial segregation. He claimed that "power and responsibility" should not be given to the indigenous Africans living in these countries because they were "ill-fitted to use [it] wisely". He expressed support for Hitler's Lebensraum policy of territorial expansion and claimed that the British race required something similar. In The Eleventh Hour, he called for the British to re-colonise parts of Africa.

=== Social policy ===
During Tyndall's period of leadership the BNP promoted eugenics, calling for the forced sterilisation of those with genetically transmittable disabilities. In party literature, it talked of improving the British "racial stock" by removing "inferior strains within the indigenous races of the British Isles". In his magazine Spearhead, Tyndall had stated that "subhuman elements", "perverts" and "asocials" should be eliminated from Britain through "the gas chamber system". When questioned as to whether Tyndall would seek to exterminate other races if he was in power, he denied it; although not objecting to said exterminations on moral grounds, he stated that such a programme would incur international unpopularity. It is unclear if these statements reflected his genuine views or were tactical justifications designed to not upset potential NF voters.

Tyndall presented himself as an agnostic although expressed admiration for what he claimed were the moral values of Christianity. Tyndall called for a "complete moral regeneration of the national life". He objected to homosexuality and advocated for it to be outlawed, writing that "the literary and artistic products of the homosexual mind can only flourish in a society where heterosexual values have been gravely weakened." He expressed the view that the NF "was itself by no means immune to this sickening cult" and he disapproved of the presence of homosexuals in the party. Under Tyndall, the BNP called for the re-criminalisation of homosexual activity.

== Personal life ==
American journalist George Thayer, who met with Tyndall in the 1960s, described him as being "blonde and balding" with "cold, evasive eyes". Thayer stated that Tyndall "had not the slightest spark of humour. He was suspicious, nervous and excitable and moved with all the stiffness of a Prussian in Court." In his study of the National Front, the journalist Martin Walker described Tyndall as giving off "an impression of absolute, if brittle, self control". Nigel Fielding, another to have studied the NF, described Tyndall as "a rather small man with a hard, unlined face and pale blue eyes. His movements are abrupt and energetic and he speaks in a loud voice with a clipped inflection." Walker described him as having a "keen political mind", with a "concern for organisation [and] meticulous planning". Tyndall lived a life of temperance and regular exercise, and—according to Walker—his early morning runs had "long been a joke in Nationalist circles".

Thurlow thought that Tyndall's oratorical style was learned from Mosley's example, while Trilling instead believed that it was based on that of Hitler. According to Trilling, Tyndall's "speeches were pompous but studied ... [he] copied the hand gestures, the rising delivery that ended in a crescendo of angry epithets [from Hitler] ... But it was flat and tedious, like a provincial PE teacher trying to show his bored pupils how the rugby or football greats might have done it." After Tyndall's death, the BNP spokesman Phil Edwards said that "he was a marvellous speaker. He could hold a room and mesmerise them, but he did not have the answer to the problems." Copsey stated that "Tyndall may have been a rousing speaker, but his tactical intelligence and vision left much to be desired". The East London BNP activist Eddy Butler noted that at a 1986 party rally in Dewsbury, Tyndall "lost them completely. He knew how to talk to a small room of nationalists, but he didn't know how to talk to a thousand Yorkshire young geezers. He hadn't got a clue about normal people or normal politics. He'd go on about the Britain of Sir Francis Drake; you'd think 'what's he on about?'"

Walker described Tyndall as being "very close to his mother", with whom he lived until 1977. On 19 November 1977, he married Valerie Dawn Olliff, a divorcée and fellow right-wing activist. The couple had a daughter named Marina. Valerie died on 24 June 2011 in Hove.

== Reception ==
Walker noted that during the 1960s, Tyndall was "well known" yet "unpopular within Nationalist circles because of his arrogance, his overbearing personal manner and the way he brought the authoritarianism of his politics into his personal life". In contrast, Fielding claimed that within the NF of the late 1970s and early 1980s, Tyndall's standing among "ordinary members" was "very high", with some of them even chanting his name during his speeches.

At Tyndall's death, the anti-fascist activist Nick Lowles stated that Tyndall had been "someone that the more hardline nationalists" in the BNP "have always looked up to and rallied around" and that he "still had a lot of support" in the party, particularly in the North West and parts of south London. Despite his standing within the British far-right, The Telegraph noted that Tyndall's devotion to neo-Nazism "prevented his cause from acquiring the slightest veneer of political respectability."

== Elections contested by John Tyndall ==
UK Parliament elections
Date of election	Constituency	Party	Votes	%	Citation
1979 general election	Hackney, S & Shoreditch	NF	1,958	7.6	
1992 general election	Bow and Poplar	BNP	1,107	3.0	
1994 by-election	Dagenham	BNP	1,511	7.0	
1997 general election	Poplar and Canning Town	BNP	2,849	7.2	
2001 general election	Mitcham and Morden	BNP	642	1.7	

European Parliament elections
Year	Region	Party	Votes	%	Results	Notes	Citation
1999	London	BNP	17,960	1.6	Not elected	Multi member constituencies; party list	

== Bibliography ==
Year	Title	Publisher	ISBN
1961	Authoritarian State: Its Meaning and Function	National Socialist Movement	–
1966	Six Principles of British Nationalism	Albion Press	–
1975	The Case for Economic Nationalism	National Front Policy Committee	ISBN 0-905109-00-7
1988	The Eleventh Hour: A Call for British Rebirth	Albion Press	ISBN 0-9513686-1-3

Party political offices
New creation	Chairman of the British National Party; 1982–1999	Succeeded by Nick Griffin
