= British National Party =

British fascist political party founded in 1982

- Abbreviation: BNP
- Chairman: Adam Walker
- Founder: John Tyndall
- Founded: 7 April 1982; 44 years ago
- Split from: National Front; British Movement
- Headquarters: Wigton, Cumbria, England
- Newspaper: Identity
- Youth wing: BNP Youth
- Membership (2015): 500
- Ideology: British fascism; Ethnic nationalism; Hard Euroscepticism; Right-wing populism; Ultranationalism; White nationalism
- Political position: Far-right
- European affiliation: Alliance of European National Movements
- Colours: Red White Blue

Website
- bnp.org.uk

The British National Party (BNP) is a far-right, fascist political party in the United Kingdom. It is headquartered in Wigton, Cumbria, and is led by Adam Walker. A fringe party, it has no elected representatives at any level of UK government. The party was founded in 1982, and reached its greatest level of success in the 2000s, when it had over fifty seats in local government, one seat on the London Assembly, and two Members of the European Parliament. It has been largely inactive since 2019.

Taking its name from that of a defunct 1960s far-right party, the BNP was created by John Tyndall and other former members of the fascist National Front (NF). During the 1980s and 1990s, the BNP placed little emphasis on contesting elections, in which it did poorly. Instead, it focused on street marches and rallies, creating the Combat 18 paramilitary—its name a coded reference to Nazi German leader Adolf Hitler—to protect its events from anti-fascist protesters. A growing 'moderniser' faction was frustrated by Tyndall's leadership, and ousted him in 1999. The new leader Nick Griffin sought to broaden the BNP's electoral base by presenting a more moderate image, targeting concerns about rising immigration rates, and emphasising localised community campaigns. This resulted in increased electoral growth throughout the 2000s, to the extent that it became the most electorally successful far-right party in British history. Concerns regarding financial mismanagement resulted in Griffin being removed as leader in 2014. By this point, the BNP's membership and vote share had declined dramatically, groups like Britain First and National Action had splintered off, and the English Defence League had supplanted it as the UK's foremost far-right group.

Ideologically positioned on the extreme-right or far-right of British politics, the BNP has been characterised as fascist or neo-fascist by political scientists. Under Tyndall's leadership, it was more specifically regarded as neo-Nazi. The party is ethnic nationalist, and it once espoused the view that only white people should be citizens of the United Kingdom. It calls for an end to non-white migration into the UK. It called initially for the compulsory expulsion of non-whites but, since 1999, it has advocated voluntary removals with financial incentives. It promotes biological racism and the white genocide conspiracy theory, calling for global racial separatism and condemning interracial relationships. Under Tyndall, the BNP emphasised antisemitism and Holocaust denial, promoting the conspiracy theory that Jews seek to dominate the world through both communism and international capitalism. Under Griffin, the party's focus switched from antisemitism towards Islamophobia. It promotes economic protectionism, Euroscepticism, and a transformation away from liberal democracy, while its social policies oppose feminism, LGBT rights, and societal permissiveness.

Operating around a highly centralised structure that gave its chair near total control, the BNP built links with far-right parties across Europe and created various sub-groups, including a record label and trade union. The BNP attracted most support from within White British working-class communities in northern and eastern England, particularly among middle-aged and elderly men. A poll in the 2000s suggested that most Britons favoured a ban on the party. It faced much opposition from anti-fascists, religious organisations, the mainstream media, and most politicians, and BNP members were banned from various professions.

== History ==
=== John Tyndall's leadership (1982–1999) ===
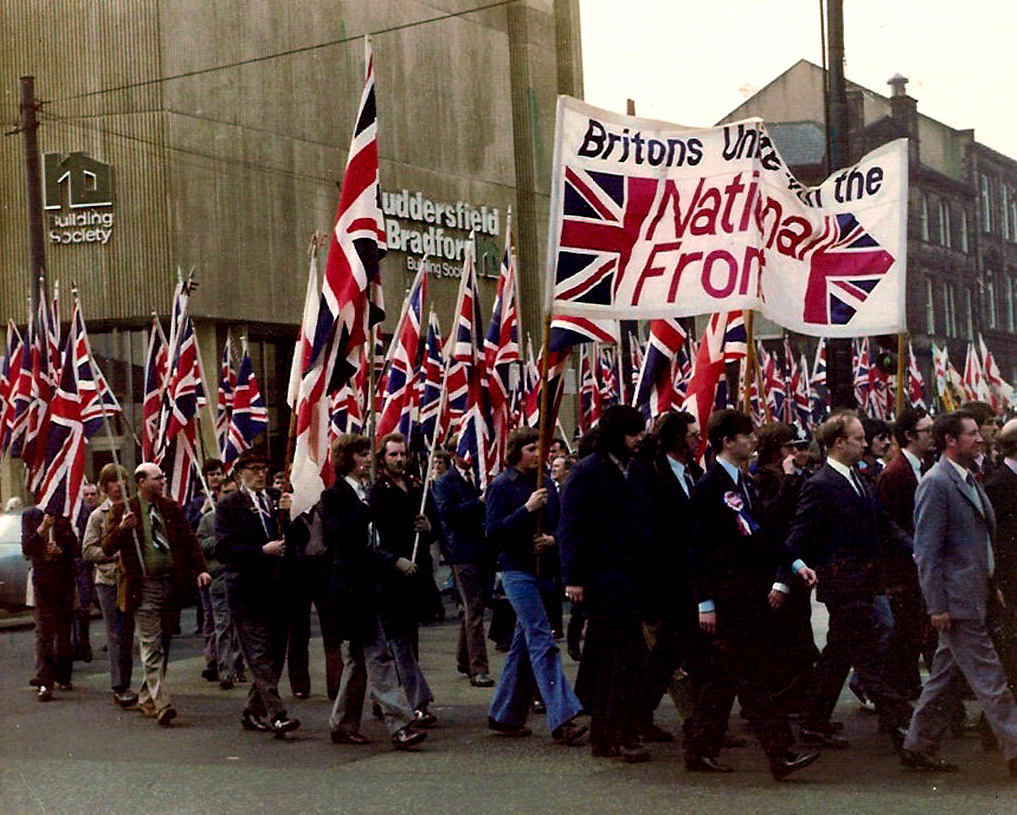
A National Front march from the 1970s, the movement from which the BNP emerged by 1982

The British National Party (BNP) (Note: The name British National Party had been used in politics by four organisations, most notably by the Mosleyite party which became the English National Association and by a 1960s party initiated by John Bean, which became part of the National Front. Tyndall was a leading member of the 1960s BNP and a founder of the present party.) was founded by the extreme-right political activist John Tyndall. Tyndall had been involved in neo-Nazi groups since the late 1950s before leading the far-right National Front (NF) throughout most of the 1970s. Following an argument with senior party member Martin Webster, he resigned from the NF in 1980. In June 1980 Tyndall established a rival, the New National Front (NNF). At the recommendation of Ray Hill—who was secretly an anti-fascist spy seeking to sow disharmony among Britain's far-right—Tyndall decided to unite an array of extreme-right groups as a single party. To this end, Tyndall established a Committee for Nationalist Unity (CNU) in January 1982. In March 1982, the CNU held a conference at the Charing Cross Hotel in London, at which 50 far-right activists agreed to the formation of the BNP.

The BNP was formally launched on 7 April 1982 at a press conference in Victoria. Led by Tyndall, most of its early members came from the NNF, although others were defectors from the NF, British Movement, British Democratic Party, and Nationalist Party. Tyndall remarked that there was "scarcely any difference [between the BNP and NF] in ideology or policy save in the minutest detail", and most of the BNP's leading activists had formerly been senior NF figures. Under Tyndall's leadership the party was neo-Nazi in orientation and engaged in nostalgia for Nazi Germany. It adopted the NF's tactic of holding street marches and rallies, believing that these boosted morale and attracted new recruits. Their first march took place in London on St. George's Day 1982. These marches often involved clashes with anti-fascist protesters and resulted in multiple arrests, helping to cement the BNP's association with political violence and older fascist groups in the public eye. As a result, BNP organisers began to favour indoor rallies, although street marches continued to be held throughout the mid-to-late 1980s.

Through the streets now we are marching.
Like an army as to war.
For the cause of race and nation.
With our banners to the fore.
Into battle, into battle, into battle BNP!
Into battle BNP!

— BNP marching song, 1982

In its early years, the BNP's involvement in elections was "irregular and intermittent", and for its first two decades it faced consistent electoral failure. It suffered from low finances and few personnel, and its leadership was aware that its electoral viability was weakened by the anti-immigration rhetoric of Conservative Party Prime Minister Margaret Thatcher. In the 1983 general election the BNP stood 54 candidates, although it only campaigned in five seats. Although it was able to air its first party political broadcast, it averaged a vote share of 0.06% in the seats it contested. After the Representation of the People Act 1985 raised the electoral deposit to £500, the BNP adopted a policy of "very limited involvement" in elections. It abstained in the 1987 general election, and stood only 13 candidates in the 1992 general election. In a 1993 local by-election the BNP gained one council seat—won by Derek Beackon in the East London district of Millwall—after a campaign that played to local whites who were angry at the perceived preferential treatment received by Bangladeshi migrants in social housing. Following an anti-BNP campaign launched by local religious groups and the Anti-Nazi League, it lost this seat during the 1994 local elections. In the 1997 general election, it contested 55 seats and gained an average 1.4% of the vote.

In the early 1990s, the paramilitary group Combat 18 (C18) (Note: The "18" in its name is derived from the initials of Adolf Hitler. A and H are the first and eighth letters of the Latin alphabet.) was formed to protect BNP events from anti-fascists. In 1992, C18 carried out attacks on left-wing targets like an anarchist bookshop and the headquarters of the Morning Star. Tyndall was angered by C18's growing influence on the BNP's street activities, and by August 1993, C18 activists were physically clashing with other BNP members. In December 1993, Tyndall issued a bulletin to BNP branches declaring C18 to be a proscribed organisation, furthermore suggesting that it may have been established by agents of the state to discredit the party. To counter the group's influence among militant British nationalists, he secured the American white nationalist militant William Pierce as a guest speaker at the BNP's annual rally in November 1995.

John Tyndall was both [the BNPs] greatest asset and its greatest drawback. His persistence, rock-like reliability and leadership had kept the movement going, but with almost imperceptible growth since its 1982 foundation.

— Senior BNP member John Bean

In the early 1990s, a "moderniser" faction emerged within the party, favouring a more electorally palatable strategy and an emphasis on building grassroots support to win local elections. It was impressed by the electoral gains made by a number of extreme-right parties in continental Europe – such as Jörg Haider's Austrian Freedom Party and Jean-Marie Le Pen's National Front – which had been achieved by both switching focus from biological racism to the perceived cultural incompatibility of different racial groups and by replacing anti-democratic platforms with populist ones. The modernisers called for community campaigns among the white working-class populations of London's East End, and Northern England. While the modernisers gained some concessions from the party's hard-liners, Tyndall opposed many of their ideas and sought to stem their growing influence. In his view, "we should not be looking for ways of applying ideological cosmetic surgery to ourselves in order to make our features more appealing to the public".

=== Nick Griffin's leadership (1999–2014) ===
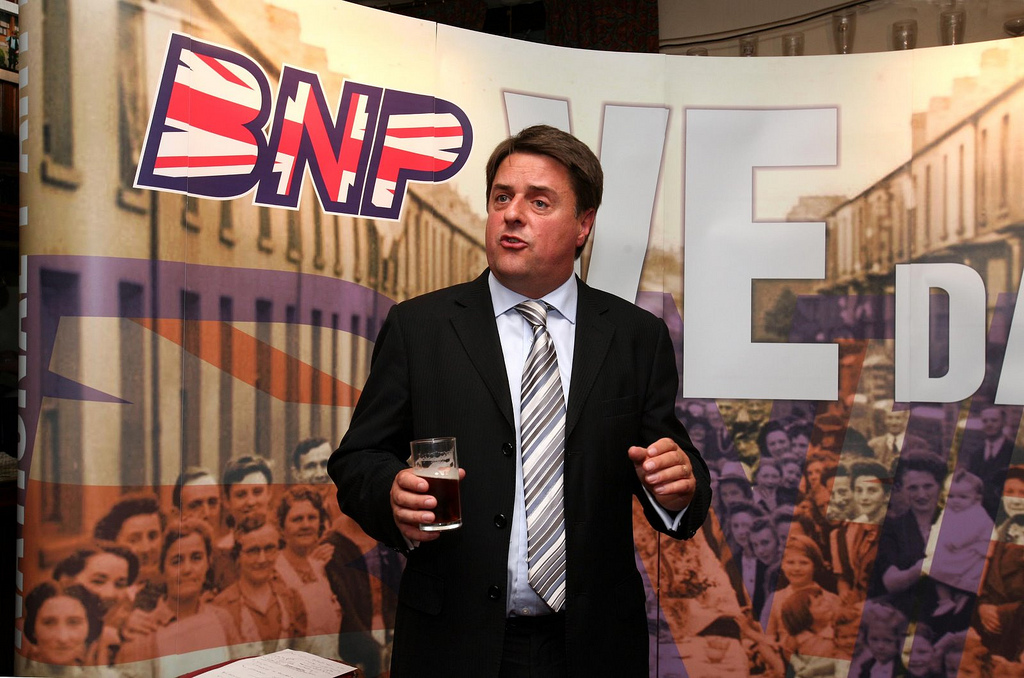
Nick Griffin at a BNP press conference in Manchester in 2009

After the BNP's poor performance at the 1997 general election, opposition to Tyndall's leadership grew. The modernisers called the party's first leadership election, and in October 1999 Tyndall was ousted when two-thirds of those voting backed Nick Griffin, who offered an improved administration, financial transparency, and greater support for local branches. Often characterised as a political chameleon, Griffin had once been considered a party hardliner before switching allegiance to the modernisers in the late 1990s. In his youth, he had been involved in the NF as well as Third Positionist groups like Political Soldier and the International Third Position. Criticising his predecessors for fuelling the image of the BNP as "thugs, losers and troublemakers", Griffin inaugurated a period of change in the party.

Influenced by Le Pen's National Front in France, Griffin sought to widen the BNP's appeal to individuals who were concerned about immigration but had not previously voted for the extreme-right. The BNP replaced Tyndall's policy of compulsory deportation of non-whites to a voluntary system whereby non-whites would be given financial incentives to emigrate. It downplayed biological racism and stressed the cultural incompatibility of different racial groups. This emphasis on culture allowed it to foreground Islamophobia; following the September 11 attacks in 2001, it launched a "Campaign Against Islam". It stressed the claim that the BNP was "not a racist party" but an "organised response to anti-white racism". At the same time Griffin sought to reassure the party's base that these reforms were based on pragmatism and not a change in principle.

Griffin also sought to shed the BNP's image as a single-issue party, by embracing a diverse array of social and economic issues. Griffin renamed the party's monthly newspaper from British Nationalist to The Voice of Freedom, and established a new journal, Identity. The party developed community-based campaigns, through which it targeted local issues, particularly in those areas with large numbers of skilled white working-class people who were disaffected with the Labour Party government. For instance, in Burnley it campaigned for lower speed limits on housing estates and against the closure of a local swimming pool, while in South Birmingham it targeted pensioners' concerns about youth gangs. In 2006, the party urged its activists to carry out local activities like cleaning up children's play areas and removing graffiti while wearing high-vis jackets emblazoned with the party logo.

Griffin believed that Peak Oil and a growth in Third World migrants arriving in Britain would result in a BNP government coming to power by 2040. The close of the twentieth century produced more favourable conditions for the extreme-right in Britain as a result of increased public concerns about immigration and established Muslim communities coupled with growing dissatisfaction with the established mainstream parties. In turn, the BNP gained rapidly growing levels of support over the coming years. In July 2000, it came second in the council elections for the North End of the London Borough of Bexley, its best result since 1993. At the 2001 general election it gained 16% of the vote in one constituency and over 10% in two others. In the 2002 local elections the BNP gained four councillors, three of whom were in Burnley, where it had capitalised on white anger surrounding the disproportionately high levels of funding being directed to the Asian-dominated Daneshouse ward. This breakthrough generated public anxieties about the party, with a poll finding that six in ten supported a ban on it. In the 2003 local elections, the BNP gained 13 additional councillors, including seven more in Burnley; the party received over 100,000 votes in this election. Concerned that much of its potential vote was going to the UK Independence Party (UKIP), in 2003 the BNP offered UKIP an electoral pact but was rebuffed. Griffin then accused UKIP of being a Labour Party scheme to steal the BNP's votes. It invested much in the campaign for the 2004 European Parliament election, at which it received 800,000 votes but failed to secure a parliamentary seat. In the 2004 local elections, it secured four more seats, including three in Epping.

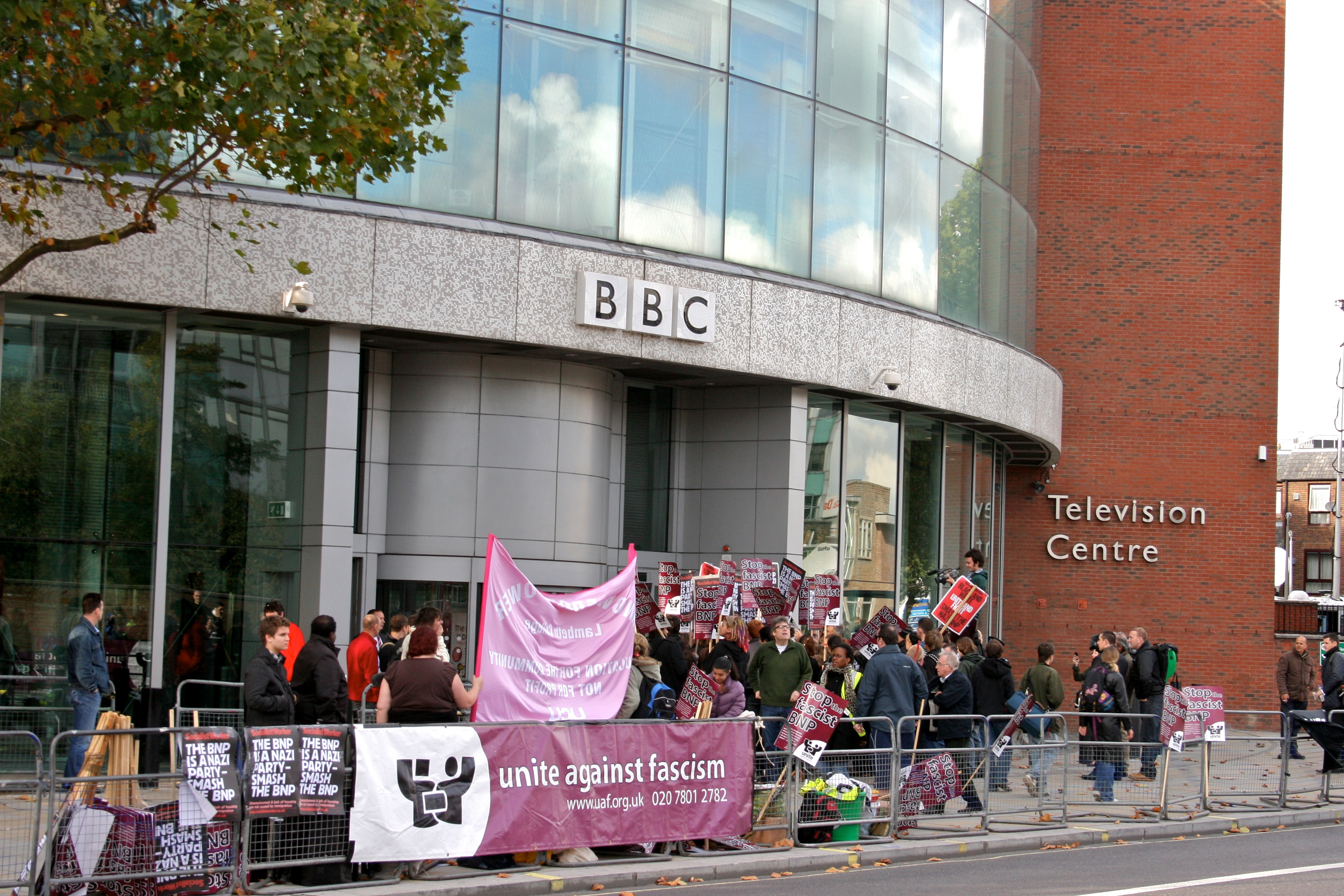
Anti-fascist protestors demonstrating against Griffin's appearance on Question Time in 2009

For the 2005 general election, the BNP expanded its number of candidates to 119 and targeted specific regions. Its average vote in the areas it contested rose to 4.3%. It gained significantly more support in three seats, achieving 10% in Burnley, 13% in Dewsbury, and 17% in Barking. In the 2006 local elections the party gained 220,000 votes, with 33 additional councillors, having averaged a vote share of 18% in the areas it contested. In Barking and Dagenham, it saw 12 of its 13 candidates elected to the council. At the 2008 London Assembly election, the BNP gained 130,000 votes, reaching the 5% mark and thus gaining an Assembly seat. At the 2009 European Parliament election, the party gained almost 1 million votes, with two of its candidates, Nick Griffin and Andrew Brons, being elected as Members of the European Parliament for North West England and Yorkshire and the Humber respectively. That election also saw extreme-right parties winning seats for various other EU member-states. This victory marked a major watershed for the party. Amid significant public controversy, Griffin was invited to appear on the BBC show Question Time in October 2009, the first time that the BNP had been invited to share a national television platform with mainstream panellists. Griffin's performance was however widely regarded as poor.

Despite the party's success, there was dissent. In 2007 a group of senior members known as the "December rebels" challenged Griffin, calling for internal party democracy and financial transparency, but were expelled. In 2008 a group of BNP activists in Bradford split to form the Democratic Nationalists. In November 2008 the BNP membership list was posted to WikiLeaks, after appearing briefly on a weblog. A year later, in October 2009, another list of BNP members was leaked.

British National Party (BNP) vote share in the 2010 UK general election

Eddy Butler then led a challenge to Griffin's leadership, alleging financial corruption, but he had insufficient support. The rebels who supported him split into two groups: one section remained as the internal Reform Group, the other left the BNP to form the British Freedom Party. By 2010, there was discontent among the party's grassroots, a result of the change to its white-only membership policy and rumours of financial corruption among its leadership. Some defected to the National Front or left to form parties like the Britannica Party. Anti-fascist groups like Hope not Hate had campaigned extensively in Barking to stop the area's locals voting for the BNP. At the 2010 general election, the BNP had hoped to make a breakthrough by gaining a seat in the House of Commons, although it failed to achieve this. It nevertheless gained the fifth largest national vote share, with 1.9% of the vote, representing the most successful electoral performance for an extreme-right party in UK history. In the 2010 local elections, it lost all of its councillors in Barking and Dagenham. Nationally, the party's number of councillors dropped from over fifty to 28. Griffin described the results as "disastrous".

=== Decline (2014–present) ===
In a 2011 leadership election, Griffin secured a narrow victory, beating Brons by nine votes of a total of 2,316 votes cast. In October 2012, Brons left the party, leaving Griffin as its sole MEP. In the 2012 local elections, the party lost all of its seats and saw its vote share fall dramatically; whereas it gained over 240,000 votes in 2008, this had fallen to under 26,000 by 2012. Commenting on the result, the politician and political commentator Matt Goodwin noted: "Put simply, the BNP's electoral challenge is over." In the 2012 London mayoral election, the BNP candidate came seventh, with 1.3% of first-preference votes, its poorest showing in the London mayoral contest. The 2012 election results established that the BNP's steady growth had ended. In the 2013 local elections, the BNP fielded 99 candidates but failed to win any council seats, leaving it with only two.

In June 2013, Griffin visited Syria along with members of Hungarian far-right party Jobbik to meet with government officials, including the Speaker of the Syrian People's Assembly, Mohammad Jihad al-Laham, and the Prime Minister Wael Nader al-Halqi. Griffin claims he was influential in the speaker of Syria's Parliament writing an open letter to British MPs urging them to "turn Great Britain from the warpath" by not intervening in the Syrian conflict. Griffin lost his European Parliament seat in the May 2014 European election. The party blamed the UK Independence Party for its decline, accusing the latter of stealing BNP policies and slogans. In July 2014, Griffin resigned and was succeeded by Adam Walker as acting chairman. In October, Griffin was expelled from the party for "trying to cause disunity [in the party] by deliberately fabricating a state of crisis".

In January 2015, membership of the party numbered 500, down from 4,220 in December 2013. At the general election in 2015, the BNP fielded eight candidates, down from 338 in 2010. The party's vote share declined 99.7% from its 2010 result. In January 2016, the Electoral Commission de-registered the BNP for failing to pay its annual registration fee of £25. At this time, it was estimated that BNP assets totalled less than £50,000. According to the commission, "BNP candidates cannot, at present, use the party's name, descriptions or emblems on the ballot paper at elections." A month later, the party was re-registered. There were ten BNP candidates at the general election in 2017. At the 2018 local elections, the party's last remaining councillor—Brian Parker of Pendle—decided not to stand for re-election, leaving the party without representation at any level of UK government. The BNP fielded only one candidate, David Furness, at the 2019 general election in Hornchurch and Upminster, where he came last.

The BNP has been essentially inactive since 2019, and has not put forward a single candidate in any elections since the 2021 local elections. The Financial Times noted in 2026 that the BNP had de facto disappeared.

== Ideology ==
=== Far-right politics, fascism and neo-Nazism ===
Many academic historians and political scientists have described the BNP as a far-right party, or as an extreme-right party. As the political scientist Matthew Goodwin used it, the term referred to "a particular form of political ideology that is defined by two anti-constitutional and anti-democratic elements: first, right-wing extremists are extremist because they reject or undermine the values, procedures and institutions of the democratic constitutional state; and second they are right-wing because they reject the principle of fundamental human equality".

Various political scientists and historians have described the BNP as being fascist in ideology. Others have instead described it as neo-fascist, a term which the historian Nigel Copsey argued was more exact. Academic observers—including the historians Copsey, Graham Macklin, and Roger Griffin, and the political theologian Andrew P. Davey—have argued that Nick Griffin's reforms were little more than a cosmetic process to obfuscate the party's fascist roots. According to Copsey, under Griffin the BNP was "fascism recalibrated—a form of neo-fascism—to suit contemporary sensibilities". Macklin noted that despite Griffin's 'modernisation' project, the BNP retained its ideological continuity with earlier fascist groups and thus had not transformed itself into a genuinely "post-fascist" party. In this it was distinct from parties like the Italian National Alliance of Gianfranco Fini, which has been credited with successfully shedding its fascist past and becoming post-fascist.

In 1995, the anti-fascist activist Gerry Gable referred to the BNP as a "Nazi organisation", while the Anti-Nazi League published leaflets describing the BNP as the "British Nazi Party". Copsey suggested that while the BNP under Tyndall could be described as neo-Nazi, it was not "crudely mimetic" of the original German Nazism. Davey characterised the BNP as a "populist ethno-nationalist" party.

The [BNP's] smart modernized veneer ... is superficial; the core of the Party remains ideologically fascist, and this was nowhere more apparent than in the BNP manifesto for the 2010 General Election, which returned to a clutch of traditional fascist themes including the bond of blood, homeland, the decadence of contemporary culture, a nostalgia for folk traditions and heritage, and an emphasis on stricter discipline in education and society. During the election campaign anti-Semitism, racism and neo-Nazi sympathies were identified on candidates' social network sites.

— Political theologian Andrew P. Davey, 2011

In his writings, Griffin acknowledged that much of his 'modernisation' was an attempt to hide the BNP's core ideology behind more electorally palatable policies. Like the National Front, the BNP's private discourse differed from its public one, with Griffin stating that "Of course we must teach the truth to the hardcore ... [but] when it comes to influencing the public, forget about racial differences, genetics, Zionism, historical revisionism and so on ... we must at all times present them with an image of moderate reasonableness". The BNP has eschewed the labels "fascist" and "Nazi", stating that it is neither. In its 1992 electoral manifesto, it said that "Fascism was Italian. Nazism was German. We are British. We will do things our own way; we will not copy foreigners". In 2009, Griffin said that the term "fascism" was simply "a smear that comes from the far left"; he added that the term should be reserved for groups that engaged in "political violence" and desired a state that "should impose its will on people", claiming that it was the anti-fascist group Unite Against Fascism—and not the BNP—who were the real fascists. More broadly, many on Britain's extreme right sought to avoid the term "British fascism" because of its electorally unpalatable connotations, utilising "British nationalism" in its place.

The BNP uses the iconography of the Union Flag prominently on its published material.

After Griffin took control of the party, it made increasing use of nativist themes in order to emphasise its "British" credentials. In its published material, the party made appeals to the idea of Britain and Britishness in a manner not dissimilar to mainstream political parties. In this material it has also made prominent use of the Union Flag and the colours red, white, and blue. Roger Griffin noted that the terms "Britain" and "England" appear "confusingly interchangeable" in BNP literature, while Copsey has pointed out that the BNP's form of British nationalism is "Anglo-centric". The party employed militaristic rhetoric under both Tyndall and Griffin's leadership; under the latter for example its published material spoke of a "war without uniforms" and a "war for our survival as a people". Tyndall described the BNP as a revolutionary party, calling it a "guerrilla army operating in occupied territory".

=== Ethnic nationalism and biological racism ===
The British National Party exists to secure a future for the indigenous peoples of these islands in the North Atlantic which have been our homeland for a millennia.

— The BNP, 2005

The BNP adheres to biological racist ideas, displaying an obsession with the perceived differences of racial groups. Both Tyndall and Griffin believed that there was a biologically distinct white-skinned "British race" which was one branch of a wider Nordic race, a view akin to those of earlier fascists such as Hitler and Arnold Leese.

The BNP adheres to an ideology of ethnic nationalism. It promotes the idea that not all citizens of the United Kingdom belong to the British nation. Instead, it states that the nation only belongs to "the English, Scots, Irish and Welsh along with the limited numbers of peoples of European descent, who have arrived centuries or decades ago and who have fully integrated into our society". This is a group that Griffin referred to as the "home people" or "the folk". According to Tyndall, "The BNP is a racial nationalist party which believes in Britain for the British, that is to say racial separatism." Richard Edmonds in 1993 told The Guardian's Duncan Campbell that "we [the BNP] are 100% racist". The BNP does not regard UK citizens who are not ethnic white Europeans as "British", and party literature calls on supporters to avoid referring to such individuals as "Black Britons" or "Asian Britons", instead describing them as "racial foreigners".

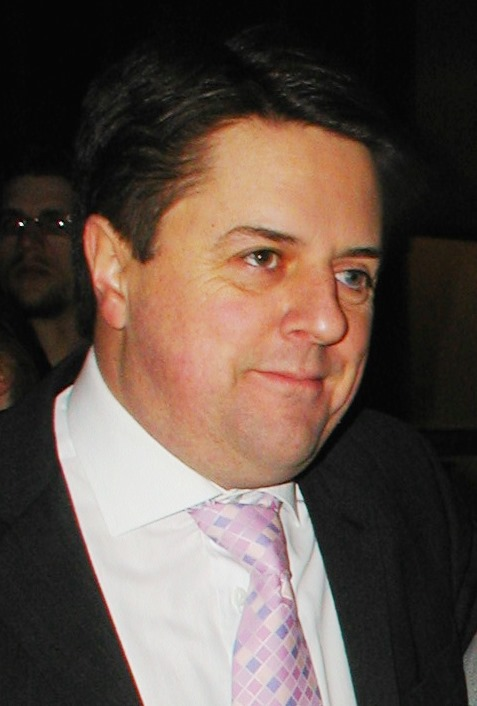
On taking over the party, Nick Griffin dropped its official espousal of the biological superiority of a Nordic race, instead emphasising the need for racial separatism to preserve global "ethno-pluralism".

Tyndall believed the white British and the broader Nordic race to be superior to other races; under his leadership, the BNP promoted pseudoscientific claims in support of white supremacy. Following Griffin's ascendency to power in the party, it officially repudiated racial supremacism and insisted that no racial group was superior or inferior to another. Instead it foregrounded an "ethno-pluralist" racial separatism, claiming that different racial groups had to be kept separate and distinct for their own preservation, maintaining that global ethno-cultural diversity was something to be protected. This switch in focus owed much to the discourse of the French Nouvelle Droite movement which had emerged within France's extreme right during the 1960s. At the same time the BNP switched focus from openly promoting biological racism to stressing what it perceived as the cultural incompatibility of racial groups. It placed great focus on opposing what it referred to as "multiculturalism", characterising this as a form of "cultural genocide", and stating that it promoted the interests of non-whites at the expense of the white British population. However, internal documents produced and circulated under Griffin's leadership demonstrated that—despite the shift in its public statements—it remained privately committed to biological racist ideas.

The party emphasises what it sees as the need to protect the racial purity of the white British. It condemns miscegenation and "race mixing", stating that this is a threat to the British race. Tyndall said that he "felt deeply sorry for the child of a mixed marriage" but had "no sympathy whatsoever for the parents". Griffin similarly stated that mixed-race children were "the most tragic victims of enforced multi-racism", and that the party would not "accept miscegenation as moral or normal ... we never will". In its 1983 election manifesto, the BNP stated that "family size is a private matter" but still called for white Britons who are "of intelligent, healthy and industrious stock" to have large families and thus raise the white British birth rate. The encouragement of high birth rates among white British families continued under Griffin's leadership.

Under Tyndall's leadership, the BNP promoted eugenics, calling for the forced sterilisation of those with genetically transmittable disabilities. In party literature, it talked of improving the British 'racial stock' by removing "inferior strains within the indigenous races of the British Isles". Tyndall argued that medical professionals should be responsible for determining whom to sterilise, while a lowering of welfare benefits would discourage breeding among those he deemed to be genetic inferiors. In his magazine Spearhead, Tyndall also stated that "the gas chamber system" should be used to eliminate "sub-human elements", "perverts", and "asocials" from British society.

=== Anti-immigration and repatriation ===
Immigration into Britain by non-Europeans ... should be terminated forthwith, and we should organise a massive programme of repatriation and resettlement overseas of those peoples of non-European origin already resident in this country.

— The BNP's first policy on repatriation, 1982

Opposition to immigration has been central to the BNP's political platform. It has engaged in xenophobic campaigns which emphasise the idea that immigrants and ethnic minorities are both different from, and a threat to, the white British and white Irish populations. In its campaign material it presented non-whites both as a source of crime in the UK, and as a socio-economic threat to the white British population by taking jobs, housing, and welfare away from them. It engaged in welfare chauvinism, calling for white Britons to be prioritised by the UK's welfare state. Party literature included such as claims as that the BNP was the only party which could "do anything effective about the swamping of Britain by the Third World" or "lead the native peoples of Britain in our version of the New Crusade that must be organised if Europe is not to sink under the Islamic yoke".

Much of its published material made claims about a forthcoming race war and promoted the conspiracy theory about white genocide. In a 2009 radio interview, Griffin referred to this as a "bloodless genocide". It presents the idea that white Britons are engaged in a battle against their own extinction as a racial group. It reiterated a sense of urgency about the situation, claiming that both high immigration rates and high birth rates among ethnic minorities were a threat to the white British. In 2010, it for instance was promoting the idea that at current levels, "indigenous Britons" would be a minority within the UK by 2060.

The immigrant communities in Britain are ... colonies filled with colonists. They are alien islands inside our towns and cities with their own laws and cultures. They will never integrate as they did not come here to integrate, but to re-create their own cultures in our country. The fact is that the only solution to Multi-Culturalism is not some asinine and bogus attempt to impose British cultural values on immigrants, but simply to commence repatriating them.

— Lee Barnes, senior BNP leader, 2005

The BNP calls for the non-white population of Britain to either be reduced in size or removed from the country altogether. Under Tyndall's leadership, it promoted the compulsory removal of non-whites from the UK, stating that under a BNP government they would be "repatriated" to their countries of origin. In the early 1990s it produced stickers with the slogan "Our Final Solution: Repatriation". Tyndall understood this to be a two-stage process that would take ten to twenty years, with some non-whites initially leaving willingly and the others then being forcibly deported. During the 1990s, party modernisers suggested that the BNP move away from a policy of compulsory repatriation and toward a voluntary system, whereby non-white persons would be offered financial incentives to leave the UK. This idea, adopted from Powellism, was deemed more electorally palatable.

When Griffin took control of the party, the policy of voluntary repatriation was officially adopted, with the party suggesting that this could be financed through the use of the UK's pre-existing foreign aid budget. It stated that any non-whites who refused to leave would be stripped of their British citizenship and categorised as "permanent guests", while continuing to be offered incentives to emigrate. Griffin's BNP also stressed its support for an immediate halt to non-white immigration into Britain and for the deportation of any migrants illegally in the country. Speaking on the BBC's Andrew Marr Show in 2009, Griffin declared that, unlike Tyndall, he "does not want all-white UK" because "nobody out there wants it or would pay for it".

=== Antisemitism and Islamophobia ===
My experience as a campaigner against the multi-racial idea in Britain and in favour of our country's centuries-old tradition of racial homogeneity has brought home to me beyond any doubt the fact that Jews are to be found at the forefront of opposition to British racial self-preservation.

— Tyndall's belief that a Jewish conspiracy was behind multiracial Britain

Under Tyndall's leadership, the BNP was openly antisemitic. From A. K. Chesterton, Tyndall had inherited a belief that there was a global conspiracy of Jews bent on world domination, viewing The Protocols of the Elders of Zion, which is known to be a forgery, as genuine evidence for this. He believed that Jews were responsible for both communism and international finance capitalism and that they were responsible for undermining the British Empire and the British race. He believed that both democratic government and immigration into Europe were parts of the Jewish conspiracy to weaken other races. In an early edition of Spearhead published in the 1960s, Tyndall wrote that "if Britain were to become Jew-clean she would have no nigger neighbours to worry about ... It is the Jews who are our misfortune: T-h-e J-e-w-s. Do you hear me? THE JEWS?" Tyndall added Holocaust denial to the antisemitic beliefs inherited from Chesterton, believing that the Holocaust was a hoax created by the Jews to gain sympathy for themselves and thus aid their plot for world domination. Among those to endorse such antisemitic conspiracy theories was Griffin, who promoted them in his 1997 pamphlet, Who are the Mind Benders? Griffin also engaged in Holocaust denial, publishing articles promoting such ideas in The Rune, a magazine produced by the Croydon BNP. In 1998, these articles resulted in Griffin being convicted of inciting racial hatred.

When Griffin took power, he sought to banish overt antisemitic discourse from the party. He informed party members that "we can get away with criticising Zionists, but any criticism of Jews is likely to be legal and political suicide". In 2006, he complained that the "obsession" that many BNP members had with "the Jews" was "insane and politically disastrous". In 2004, the party selected a Jewish candidate, Pat Richardson, to stand for it during local council elections, something Tyndall lambasted as a "gimmick". References to Jews in BNP literature were often coded to hide the party's electorally unpalatable antisemitic ideas. For instance, the term "Zionists" was often used in party literature as a euphemism for "Jews". As noted by Macklin, Griffin still framed many of his arguments "within the parameters of recognizably anti-Semitic discourse". The BNP's literature is replete with references to a conspiratorial group who have sought to suppress nationalist sentiment among the British population, who have encouraged immigration and mixed-race relationships, and who are promoting the Islamification of the country. This group is likely a reference to the Jews, being an old fascist canard.

Sectors of the extreme-right were highly critical of Griffin's softening on the subject of the Jews, claiming that he had "sold out" to the 'Zionist Occupied Government'. In 2006, John Bean, editor of Identity, included an article in which he reassured BNP members that the party had not "sold out to the Jews" or "embraced Zionism" but that it remained "committed to fighting ... subversive Jews". Under Griffin, the BNP's website linked to other web pages that explicitly portrayed immigration as part of a Jewish conspiracy, while it also sold books that promoted Holocaust denial. In 2004, secretly filmed footage was captured in which Griffin was seen claiming that "the Jews simply bought the West, in terms of press and so on, for their own political ends".

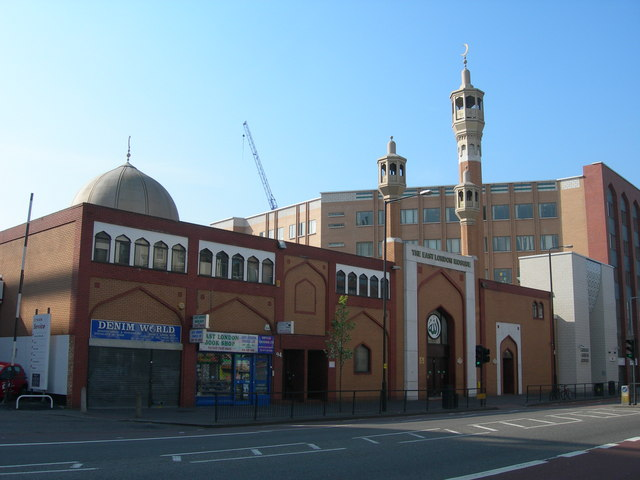
The BNP have called for the banning of any further mosques being constructed in the UK.

Copsey noted that a "culture of anti-Semitism" still pervaded the BNP. In 2004, a London activist told reporters that "most of us hate Jews", while a Scottish BNP group was observed making Nazi salutes while shouting "Auschwitz". The party's Newcastle upon Tyne Central candidate compared the Auschwitz concentration camp to Disneyland, while their Luton North candidate stated her refusal to buy from "the kikes that run Tesco". In 2009, a BNP councillor from Stoke-on-Trent resigned from the party, complaining that it still contained Holocaust deniers and Nazi sympathisers.

Griffin informed BNP members that rather than "bang on" about the Jews—which would be deemed extremist and prove electorally unpopular—their party should focus on criticising Islam, an issue that would be more resonant among the British public. After Griffin took over, the party increasingly embraced an Islamophobic stance, launching a "Campaign Against Islam" in September 2001. In Islam: A Threat to Us All, a leaflet distributed to London households in 2007, the BNP claimed that it would stand up to both Islamic extremism and "the threat that 'mainstream' Islam poses to our British culture". In contrast to the mainstream British view that the actions of militant Islamists—such as those who perpetrated the 7 July 2005 London bombings—are not representative of mainstream Islam, the BNP insists that they are. In some of its literature it presents the view that every Muslim in Britain is a threat to the country. Griffin referred to Islam as an "evil, wicked faith", and elsewhere publicly described it as a "cancer" that needed to be removed from Europe through "chemotherapy".

The BNP has called for the prohibition of immigration from Muslim countries and for the banning of the burka, halal meat, and the building of new mosques in the UK. It also called for the immediate deportation of radical Islamist preachers from the country. In 2005, the party stated that its primary issue of concern was the "growth of fundamentalist-militant Islam in the UK and its ever-increasing threat to Western civilization and our implicit values". To broaden its anti-Islamic agenda, Griffin's BNP made overtures to the UK's Hindu, Sikh, and Jewish communities; Griffin's claim that Jews can make "good allies" in the fight against Islam caused controversy within the international far-right.

=== Government ===
Tyndall believed that liberal democracy was damaging to British society, stating that liberalism was a "doctrine of decay and degeneration". Under Tyndall, the party sought to dismantle the UK's liberal democratic system of parliamentary governance, although was vague about what it sought to replace this system with. In his 1988 work The Eleventh Hour, Tyndall wrote of the need for "an utter rejection of liberalism and a dedication to the resurgence of authority". Tyndall's BNP perceived itself as a revolutionary force that would bring about a national rebirth in Britain, entailing a radical transformation of society. It proposed a state in which the Prime Minister would have full executive powers, and would be elected directly by the population for an indefinite period of time. This Prime Minister could be dismissed from office in a further election that could be called if Parliament produced a vote of no confidence in them. It stated that rather than having political parties, candidates standing for election to the parliament would be independent. During the period of Griffin's leadership, the party downplayed its anti-democratic themes and instead foregrounded populist ones. Its campaign material called for the devolution of greater powers to local communities, the reestablishment of county councils, and the introduction of citizens' initiative referendums based on those used in Switzerland.

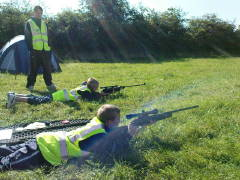
Air rifle training at the BNP's 2008 youth camp

The BNP has adopted a hard Eurosceptic platform from its foundation. Under Tyndall's leadership, the BNP had overt anti-Europeanist tendencies. Throughout the 1980s and 1990s, he maintained the party's opposition to the European Economic Community. Antagonism toward what became the European Union was retained under Griffin's leadership, which called for the UK to leave the Union. One of Vote Leave's biggest donors during the Brexit referendum was former BNP member Gladys Bramall, and the party has claimed that its anti-Establishment rhetoric "created the road" to Britain's vote to leave the European Union.

Tyndall suggested replacing the EEC with a trading association among the "White Commonwealth", namely countries like Canada, Australia, and New Zealand. Tyndall held imperialist views and was sympathetic to the re-establishment of the British Empire through the recolonization of parts of Africa. However, officially the BNP had no plans to re-establish the British Empire or secure dominion over non-white nations. In the 2000s, it called for an immediate military withdrawal from both the Iraq War and the War in Afghanistan. During his appearance on Question Time, regarding the Iraq War, Griffin described the war as "illegal", saying, "We shouldn't have gone into Iraq, we must never go into Iran, we should leave them alone." It has advocated ending overseas aid to provide economic support within the UK and to finance the voluntary repatriation of legal immigrants.

Under Tyndall, the BNP rejected both Welsh nationalism and Scottish nationalism, stating that they were bogus because they caused division among the wider "British race". Tyndall also led the BNP in support of Ulster loyalism, for instance by holding public demonstrations against the Irish republican party Sinn Féin, and endorsing Ulster loyalist paramilitaries. Under Griffin, the BNP continued to support Northern Ireland's membership of the United Kingdom, calling for the crushing of the Irish Republican Army and the scrapping of the Anglo-Irish Agreement. Griffin later expressed the view that "the only solution that could possibly be acceptable to loyalists and republicans alike" would be the reintegration of the Irish Republic into the United Kingdom, which would be reorganised along federal lines. However, while retaining the party's commitment to Ulster loyalism, under Griffin the importance of the issue was downplayed, something that was criticised by Tyndall loyalists.

=== Economic policy ===
Tyndall described his approach to the economy as "National Economics", expressing the view that "politics must lead, and not be led by, economic forces". His approach rejected economic liberalism because it did not serve "the national interest", although still saw advantages in a capitalist system, looking favourably on individual enterprise. He called on capitalist elements to be combined with socialist ones, with the government playing a role in planning the economy. He promoted the idea of the UK becoming an autarky which was economically self-sufficient, with domestic production protected from foreign competition. This attitude was heavily informed by the corporatist system that had been introduced in Benito Mussolini's Fascist Italy.

A number of senior members, including Griffin and John Bean, had anti-capitalist leanings, having been influenced by Strasserism and National Bolshevism. Under Griffin's leadership, the BNP promoted economic protectionism and opposed globalisation. Its economic policies reflect a vague commitment to distributist economics, ethno-socialism, and national autarky. The BNP maintains a policy of protectionism and economic nationalism, although in comparison with other far-right nationalist parties, the BNP focuses less on corporatism. It has called for British ownership of its own industries and resources and the "subordination of the power of the City to the power of the government". It has promoted the regeneration of farming in the United Kingdom, with the object of achieving maximum self-sufficiency in food production. In 2002, the party criticised corporatism as a "mixture of big capitalism and state control", saying it favoured a "distributionist tradition established by home-grown thinkers" favouring small business. The BNP has also called for the renationalisation of the railways. The BNP, in its 2010 manifesto, called for Britain to emulate the tiger states of East Asia, such as South Korea and Singapore.

When it comes to environmentalism, the BNP refers to itself as the "real green party", stating that the Green Party of England and Wales engages in "watermelon" politics by being green (environmentalist) on the outside but red (leftist) on the inside. Influenced by the Nouvelle Droite, it framed its arguments regarding environmentalism in an anti-immigration manner, talking about the need for 'sustainability'. It engages in climate change denial, with Griffin claiming that global warming is a hoax orchestrated by those trying to establish the New World Order.

=== Social issues ===
There is only one political party that Christians can support without betraying the Lord Jesus Christ. This Party is opposed to abortion and the teaching of homosexuality to children. This Party supports the institution of marriage and the traditional family ... This Party is opposed to political correctness and the creeping Islamification of Britain.

— A 2010 BNP leaflet distributed to Christian leaders

The BNP is opposed to feminism and has pledged that—if in government—it would introduce financial incentives to encourage women to leave employment and become housewives. It would also seek to discourage children being born out of wedlock. It has stated that it would criminalise abortion, except in cases where the child has been conceived as a result of rape, the mother's life is threatened, or the child will be disabled. There are nevertheless circumstances where it has altered this anti-abortion stance; an article in British Nationalist stated that a white woman bearing the child of a black man should "abort the pregnancy ... for the good of society". More widely, the party censures inter-racial sex and accuses the British media of encouraging inter-racial relationships.

Under Tyndall, the BNP called for the re-criminalisation of homosexual activity. Following Griffin's takeover, it moderated its policy on homosexuality. However, it opposed the 2004 introduction of civil partnerships for same-sex couples. During his 2009 Question Time appearance, Griffin described the sight of two men kissing as "for a lot of us (Christians) ... really creepy". The party has also condemned the availability of pornography; its 1992 manifesto stated that the BNP would give the "pedlars of this filth ... the criminal status that they deserve". The BNP promoted the reintroduction of capital punishment, and the sterilisation of some criminals. It also called for the reintroduction of national service in the UK, adding that on completion of this service adults would be permitted to keep their standard issue assault rifle.

According to the academic Steven Woodbridge, the BNP had a "rather ambivalent attitude toward Christian belief and religious themes in general" during most of its history, but under Griffin's modernisation the party increasingly utilised Christian terminology and themes in its discourse. Various members of the party presented themselves as "true Christians", and defenders of the faith, with key ideologues stating that the religion has been "betrayed" and "sold out" by mainstream clergy and the British establishment. British Christianity, the BNP said, was under threat from Islam, Marxism, multiculturalism, and "political correctness". On analysing the BNP's use of Christianity, Davey argued that the party's emphasis was not on Christian faith itself, but on the inheritance of European Christian culture.

The BNP long considered the mainstream media to be one of its major impediments to electoral success. Tyndall said that the media represents a "state above the state" which was committed to the "left-liberal" goals of internationalism, liberal democracy, and racial integration. The party has said that the mainstream media has given disproportionate coverage to the achievements of ethnic minority sportsmen and to the victims of anti-black racism while ignoring white victims of racial prejudice and the BNP's activities. Both Tyndall and Griffin have said that the mainstream media is controlled by Jews, who use it for their own devices; the latter promoted this idea in his Who are the Mind Benders? Griffin has described the BBC as "a thoroughly unpleasant, ultra-leftist establishment". The BNP has stated that if it took power, it would end "the dictatorship of the media over free debate". It said that it would introduce a law prohibiting the media from disseminating falsehoods about an individual or organisation for financial or political gain, and that it would ban the media from promoting racial integration. BNP policy pledges to protect freedom of speech, as part of which it would repeal all laws banning racial or religious hate speech. It would repeal the 1998 Human Rights Act and withdraw from the European Convention on Human Rights.

=== Voter base ===
The BNP does not have mass appeal, but the evidence ... suggests it is forging ties with 'angry white men': middle-aged and elderly working-class men who have low levels of education, are deeply pessimistic about their economic prospects and live in more deprived urban areas close to large Muslim communities. Foremost, these citizens are sending a message about their profound concern over issues they care deeply about, but which they feel are not being adequately addressed by the main parties.

— Political scientist Matthew Goodwin, 2011

Goodwin described the BNP's voters as being "socially distinct and concerned about a specific set of issues". Under Griffin's leadership, the party targeted areas with high proportions of skilled white working-class voters, particularly those who were disenchanted with the Labour government. It has attempted to appeal to disaffected Labour voters with slogans such as "We are the Labour Party your Grandfather Voted For". The BNP had little success in gaining support from women, the middle classes, and the more educated.

Goodwin noted a "strong male bias" in the party's support base, with statistical polling revealing that between 2002 and 2006, seven out of ten BNP voters were male. That same research also indicated that BNP voters were disproportionately middle-aged and elderly, with three quarters being aged over 35, and only 11% aged between 18 and 24. This contrasted to the NF's support base during the 1970s, when 40% of its voters were aged between 18 and 24. Goodwin suggested two possibilities for the BNP's failure to appeal to younger voters: one was the 'life cycle effect', that older people have obtained more during their life and thus have more to lose, feeling both more threatened by change and more socially conservative in their views. The other explanation was the 'generational effect', with younger Britons who have grown up since the onset of mass immigration having had greater social exposure to ethnic minorities and thus being more tolerant toward them. Conversely, many older voters came of age during the 1970s, under the impact of the anti-immigrant rhetoric promoted by Powellism, Thatcherism, and the NF, and thus have less tolerant attitudes.

Most BNP voters had no formal qualifications and the party's support was centred largely in areas with low educational attainment. According to the 2002–2006 data, two-thirds of BNP voters had either no formal qualifications or had left education after their O-levels/GCSEs. Only one in ten BNP voters possessed an A-level, and an even smaller percentage had a university degree. Most of the BNP's voting base were from the financially insecure lower classes. Research conducted from 2002 to 2006 indicated that seven out of ten BNP voters were either skilled or unskilled workers or unemployed. A 2009 poll found that six out of ten BNP voters fitted this profile. Goodwin suggested that it was the skilled working classes rather than their unskilled or unemployed neighbours who were the main support base behind the BNP, because they owned some assets and thus felt that they had more to lose as a result of the economic threat posed by immigrants and ethnic minorities.

Research indicated that BNP voters also held opinions that were distinct from the average British citizen. They were far more pessimistic about their economic prospects than average, with seven out of ten BNP voters expecting their economic prospects to decline in future, contrasted with four out of ten who held this view in the wider population. In the 2002–2006 period, 59% of BNP voters considered immigration to be the most important issue facing the UK, compared with only 16% of the wider population who agreed. By 2009, 87% of BNP voters identified immigration and asylum as the most important issue, to 49% of the wider population. BNP voters were also more likely to identify law and order, the EU, and Islamic extremism as the most important issues facing the UK than other voters, and less likely than average to rate the economy, NHS, pensions, and housing market as the most important.

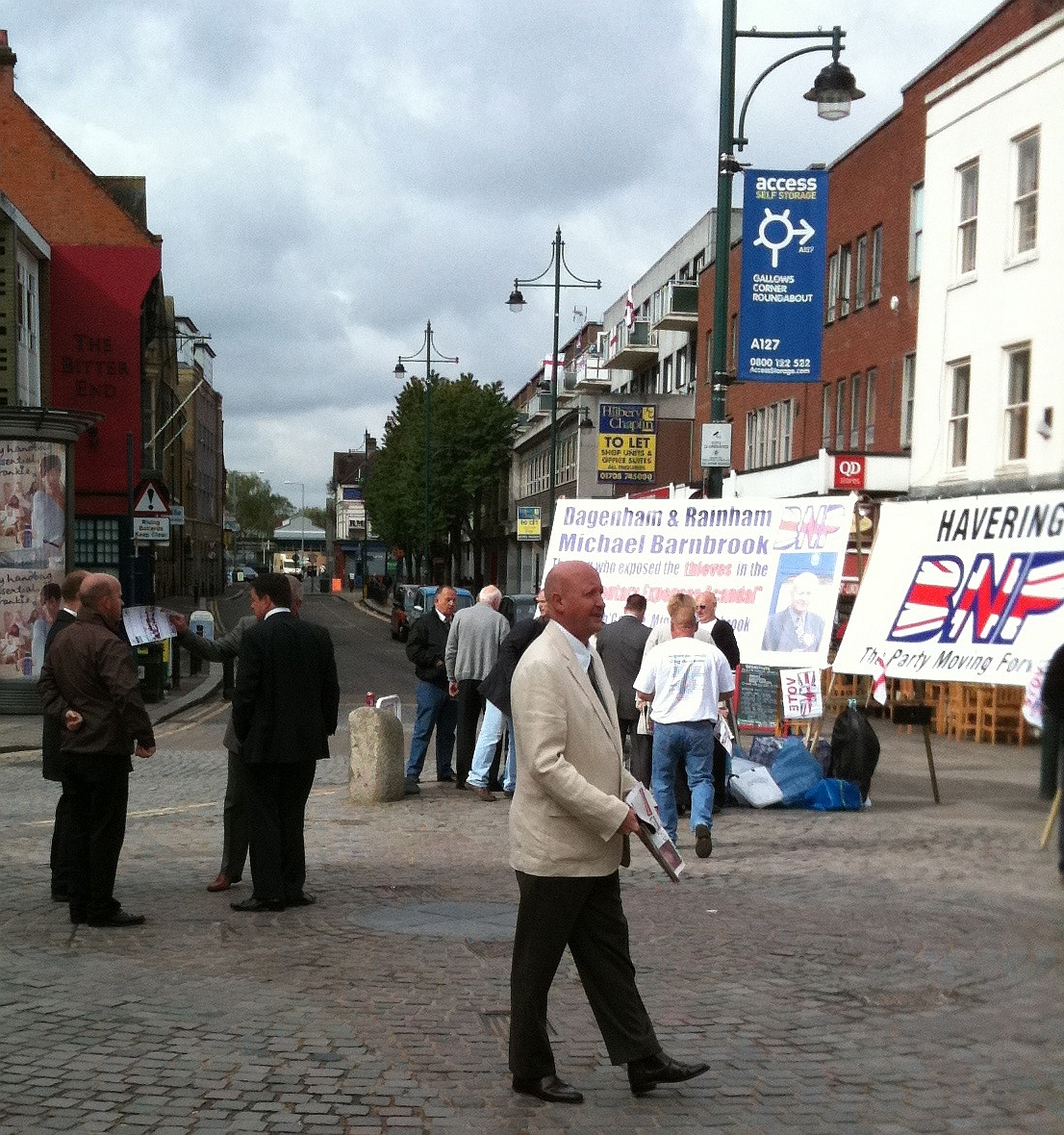
BNP members campaigning in the London Borough of Havering in 2010

BNP voters were also more likely than average to believe both that white Britons face unfair discrimination, and that Muslims, non-whites, and homosexuals had unfair advantages in British society. 78% of BNP voters endorsed the belief that the Labour Party prioritised immigrants and ethnic minorities over white British people, to 44% of the wider population. When asked questions about immigration and Muslims, BNP voters were found to be far more hostile to them than the average Briton, and also more willing than average to support outright racially discriminatory policies toward them. Copsey believed that "popular racism"—namely against asylum seekers and Muslims—generated the BNP's "largest reservoir of support", and that in many Northern English towns the main factors behind BNP support were white resentment toward Asian communities, anger at Asian-on-white crime, and the perception that Asians received disproportionately high levels of public funding.

Research also indicated that BNP voters were more mistrustful of the establishment than average citizens. In 2002–2006, 92% of BNP voters described themselves as being dissatisfied with the government, to 62% of the wider population. Over 80% of BNP voters were found to distrust their local Member of Parliament, council officials, and civil servants, and were also more likely than average to think that politicians were personally corrupt. There was also a tendency for BNP voters to read tabloids like the Daily Mail, Daily Express, and The Sun, all of which promote anti-immigration sentiment. Whether these voters gained such sentiment as a result of reading these tabloids or they read these tabloids because it endorsed their pre-existing views is unclear.

The early stronghold of the BNP was in London, where it established enclaves of support in the boroughs of Enfield, Hackney, Lewisham, Southwark, and Tower Hamlets, with smaller units in Bexley, Camden, Greenwich, Hillingdon, Lambeth and Redbridge. By the late 1990s, the party was increasingly retreating from its original East End heartland, finding that its electoral support had declined in the area. Griffin expressed the view that it was too dangerous for BNP activists to campaign in the East End, suggesting that they would be likely to be attacked by opponents. Instead, the party shifted its focus to parts of Outer London, in particular the boroughs of Barking, Bexley, Dagenham, Greenwich and Havering. After Griffin took power, the party focused on building support in the North of England, taking advantage of the anxieties generated by the ethnic riots that took place in Bradford, Oldham and Burnley in 2001. In the period between 2002 and 2006, over 40% of the BNP's voters were in Northern England.

The decline of the BNP as an electoral force around 2014 helped to open the way for the growth of another right-wing party, UKIP. In a study Goodwin produced with Robert Ford, the two political scientists noted that UKIP's support base mirrored the BNP's in that it had the same "very clear social profile": the "old, male, working class, white and less educated". One area where the two differed, they noted, was in the fact that BNP support had been highest among the middle-aged before tailing off among the over 55s, whereas UKIP retained strong support with those over 55. Ford and Goodwin suggested that this might be because more over 55s had "direct or indirect experiences" of the Second World War, in which Britain defeated the fascist powers, resulting in them being less inclined to support fascist parties than their younger counterparts. Despite these commonalities, UKIP proved far more successful at mobilising these social groups than did the BNP. This was likely in part because UKIP had a "reputational shield"; it emerged from within the Eurosceptic tradition of British politics rather than from the far-right and thus, while often ridiculed by the mainstream, was regarded as a legitimate democratic actor in a way that the BNP was not.

== Organisation ==
=== Structure ===
On its formation, the BNP avoided the National Front's committee-rule system of collective leadership in the hope of evading the infighting and factionalism that had damaged the NF. Instead it was founded around what it called the "leadership principle", with a central chairman having complete control over the party, which was then arranged in a highly hierarchical structure. The BNP lacked internal democracy, with the grassroots membership having almost no formal power, except for electing the party leader. On taking power, Griffin retained the leadership principle inherited from Tyndall. He nevertheless established an Advisory Council which would meet several times a year; the members were to be selected by Griffin himself and would serve as his advisors.

The party's branches and local groups were referred to as "units" within the party. These were designed to recruit followers, raise funds, and campaign during elections. Under Tyndall, the party operated with a skeleton organisation. It had no full-time staff and for most of the 1980s lacked a telephone number. Instead it relied on a handful of geographically scattered, unpaid regional organisers. Its early activists were recruited from within the extreme-right movement, and thus lacked the experience and skills in electoral campaigning. When Griffin took control, he introduced a variety of internal departments to help manage the party's activities: the administration and enquiries department, department for group development, legal affairs department, security department, and communications department. Griffin tried to build a more professional party machine by educating and training BNP members, providing them with incentives, establishing a steady income stream, and overcoming factionalism and dissent. He launched an "annual college" for activists in 2001 and formed an education and training department in 2007. In 2008 and 2010, he oversaw the establishment of "summer schools" for high-ranking officials. The party also began employing full-time members of staff, having three in 2001 and 13 in 2007.

To incentivise members to remain committed to the party, Griffin followed the example of the Swedish National Democrats by implementing a new "voting membership" scheme in 2007. This meant that those who had been BNP members for two years could become a "voting member", at which they would go on a year's probation. During this year they were required to attend educational and training seminars, to engage in a certain amount of activism and to donate a specified amount of money to the party. Once completed, they were allowed to vote on certain matters at general members' meetings and annual conferences, to participate in policy debates, and to be eligible for intermediate and senior positions. This policy ensured that those who reached the higher echelons of the BNP were fully trained in the party's ideology and electoral strategy.

=== Sub-groups and propaganda output ===
Griffin hoped to build a wider social movement around the BNP by establishing affiliated networks and organisations. In many cases, these were presented to the public in a way that concealed any direct connection to the BNP. Most of these affiliated groups were poorly funded and had few members. The party established its own record label, Great White Records, a radio station, and a trade union known as Solidarity – The Union for British Workers. It formed a group for young people known as the Young BNP, although in 2010 renamed this group as the BNP Crusaders, "to pay homage to our ancestors from the Middle Ages who saved Christian Europe from the onslaught of Islam". It established a Land and People group to recruit support in rural areas, a Family Circle to recruit women and families, and both a Veterans Group and an Association of British ex-Servicemen for former military servicemen. A group called Families Against Immigrant Racism was established to counter perceived racism against white Britons, while an Ethnic Liaison Committee was created to build links with anti-Muslim Hindu and Sikh groups active in Britain. Another group was the American Friends of the British National Party (AFBNP), set up by Mark Cotterill in 1999 to gain support from sympathisers in the United States. In 2001 it had 100 members, and by 2008 had 107.

A group called Islands of the North Atlantic (IONA) was established to promote the BNP's view of British culture and identity. The British Students Association was founded to promote the party's views among university students in 2000. Albion Life Insurance was set up in September 2006 as an insurance brokerage company established on behalf of the BNP to raise funds for its activities. The firm ceased to operate in November 2006. In 2006, the BNP launched the Christian Council of Britain (CCB), a group designed to rival the Muslim Council of Britain and oppose the growing "Islamification" of inner city areas. The CCB was established and run by BNP member Robert West, who claimed to have been ordained by the Apostolic Church, a claim that the church denies. West is a Calvinist and espouses a theology of nations which is influenced by Calvinist theologians like Abraham Kuyper, holding that God wishes every race and nation to remain separate until end time.

Griffin's BNP also established an annual Red, White and Blue festival, which was based on the Bleu Blanc Rouge organised by France's National Front. The festival brought party activists together and aimed to promote a more family friendly image for the group, although it also provided a venue for white power skinhead bands like Stigger, Nemesis and Warlord. Around 1,000 BNP members attended the party's 2001 festival.

Under Griffin's leadership, the BNP zealously embraced the use of alternative media to promote itself in a way different from the negative portrayal that featured in the mainstream media. On its website—which had been established in 1995—it created an internet television channel, 'BNPtv'. It has created blogs that cover different themes without being explicitly political in order to promote the party's message. The BNP established an online marketing platform, Excalibur, through which to sell its merchandise. In 2003, the BNP said that it had the most viewed website of a political party in Britain, and by 2011 was claiming to have the most viewed such website in Europe. In September 2007, The Daily Telegraph newspaper reported that Hitwise, the online competitive intelligence service, said that the BNP website had more hits than any other website of a British political party.

=== Leadership ===
Party leaders by chronological order
Leader		Period	Time in office
1.	John Tyndall	7 April 1982 – 27 September 1999	17 years, 173 days
2.	Nick Griffin	27 September 1999 – 21 July 2014	14 years, 297 days
3.	Adam Walker	21 July 2014 – present	12 years, 93 days

=== Membership ===
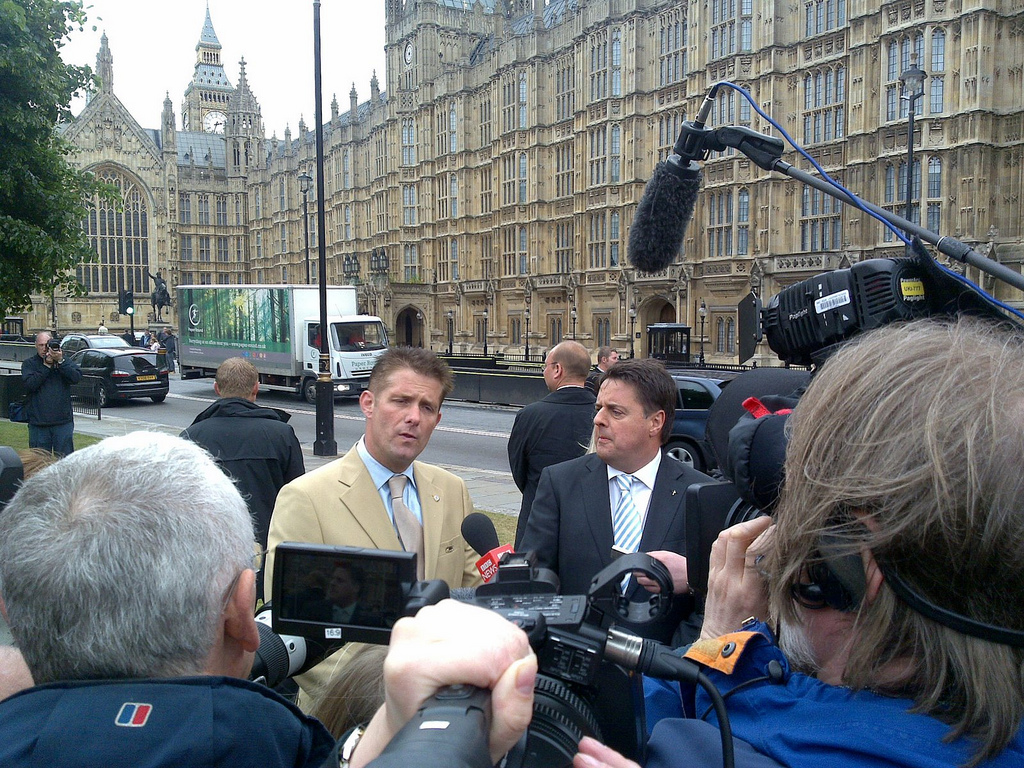
A BNP press conference in 2009, featuring Richard Barnbrook and Nick Griffin

For most of its history, the BNP had a whites-only membership policy. In 2009, the state's Equality and Human Rights Commission stated that this was a violation of the Race Relations Act 1976 and called on the party to amend its constitution accordingly. Responding to this, in early 2010 members voted to remove the racial restriction to membership. At its creation, the BNP had approximately 1,200 members. By the 1983 general election, this had grown to approximately 2,500, although by 1987 had slumped to 1,000, with no significant further growth until the 21st century. After taking control Griffin began publishing the party's membership figures: 2,174 in 2001, 3,487 in 2002, 5,737 in 2003, and 7,916 in 2004. Membership dropped slightly to 6,281 in 2005, but had grown to 9,297 in 2007 and to 10,276 in spring 2010. In 2011, it was noted that this meant that the BNP had experienced the most rapid growth since 2001 of any minor party in the UK.

A party membership list dating from late 2007 was leaked onto the internet by a disgruntled activist, containing the names and addresses of 12,000 members. This included names, addresses and other personal details. People on the list included prison officers (barred from BNP membership), teachers, soldiers, civil servants and members of the clergy. The leaked list indicated that membership was concentrated in particular areas, namely the East Midlands, Essex, and Pennine Lancashire, but with particular clusters in Charnwood, Pendle, and Amber Valley. Many of these areas had long been targeted by extreme-right campaigns, dating back to the NF activity of the 1970s, suggesting that such longstanding activism may have had an effect on levels of BNP membership. This information also revealed that membership was most likely in urban areas with low rates of educational attainment and large numbers of economically insecure people employed in manufacturing, with further correlations to nearby Muslim communities. Following an investigation by Welsh police and the Information Commissioner's Office, two people were arrested in December 2008 for breach of the Data Protection Act concerning the leak. Matthew Single was subsequently found guilty and fined £200 in September 2009. The 'low' fine was criticised as an "absolute disgrace" by a BNP spokesman and a detective sergeant involved said he was "disappointed" with the outcome, stating that people were fearful for their safety. More than 160 complaints were made nationally to police after attacks on BNP members and their property.

The leaked membership list showed that the party was 17.22% female. While women have occupied key positions within the BNP, men dominated at every level of the party. In 2009, over 80% of the party's Advisory Council was male and from 2002 to 2009, three-quarters of its councillors were male. The average percentage of female candidates presented at local elections in 2001 was 6%, although this had risen to 16% by 2010. Since 2006, the party had made a point of selecting female candidates, with Griffin stating that this was necessary to "soften" the party's image. Goodwin suggested that membership fell into three camps: the "activist old guard" who had previously been involved in the NF during the 1970s, the "political wanderers" who had defected from other parties to the BNP, and the "new recruits" who had joined post-2001 and who had little or no political interest or experience beforehand.

Having performed qualitative research among the BNP by interviewing various members, Goodwin noted that few of those he interviewed "conformed to the popular stereotypes of them being irrational and uninformed crude racists". He noted that most strongly identified with the working class and claimed to have either been former Labour voters or from a Labour-voting family. None of those interviewed claimed a family background in the ethnic nationalist movement. Instead, he noted that members said that they joined the party as a result of a "profound sense of anxiety over immigration and rising ethno-cultural diversity" in Britain, along with its concomitant impact on "British culture and society". He noted that among these members, the perceived cultural threat of immigrants and ethnic minorities was given greater prominence than the perceived economic threat that they posed to white Britons. He noted that in his interviews with them, members often framed Islam in particular as a threat to British values and society, expressing the fear that British Muslims wanted to Islamicise the country and eventually impose sharia on its population.

=== Finances ===
In contrast to the UK's mainstream parties, the BNP received few donations from businesses, wealthy donors, or trade unions. Instead it relied on finances produced by its membership. Under Tyndall, the party operated on a shoestring budget with a lack of transparency; in 1992 it collected £5000 and in 1997 it collected £10,000. It also tried raising money by selling extreme-right literature, and opened a bookshop in Welling in 1989, although this was closed in 1996 after being attacked by anti-fascists and proving too costly to run. In 1992, the party formed a dining club of its wealthier supporters, which was renamed the Trafalgar Club in 2000. By the 1997 general election, it admitted that its expenses had "far out-stripped" its income, and it was appealing for donations to pay off loans it had taken out.

Griffin placed greater emphasis on fundraising; from 2001 through to 2008, the BNP's annual turnover increased almost fivefold. Membership subscriptions grew from £35,000 to £166,000, while its donations raised from £38,000 to £660,000. However, expenses also rose as the BNP spent more on its electoral campaigns, and the party reported a financial deficit in 2004 and again in 2005. Between 2007 and 2009, the BNP accumulated debts of £500,000.

=== International affiliations ===
Under Griffin, the BNP forged stronger links with various extreme-right parties elsewhere in Europe, among them France's National Front, Germany's National Democratic Party (NPD), Sweden's National Democrats, and Hungary's Jobbik. Griffin unsuccessfully urged the NPD to move away from neo-Nazism and embark on the same 'modernisation' project that he had taken the BNP. Jean-Marie Le Pen of the French Front National was the guest of honour at an "Anglo-French Patriotic Dinner" held by the BNP in April 2004. Griffin met leaders of the Hungarian far right party Jobbik to discuss co-operation between the two parties and spoke at a Jobbik party rally in August 2008. In April 2009, Simon Darby, deputy chairman of the BNP, was welcomed with fascist salutes by members of the Italian nationalist Forza Nuova during a trip to Milan. Darby stated that the BNP would look to form an alliance with France's Front National in the European Parliament. Following the election of two BNP MEPs in 2009, the following year saw the BNP join with other extreme-right parties to form the Alliance of European National Movements, with Griffin becoming its vice president. The party also had close links with the Historical Review Press, a publisher focused on promoting Holocaust denial.

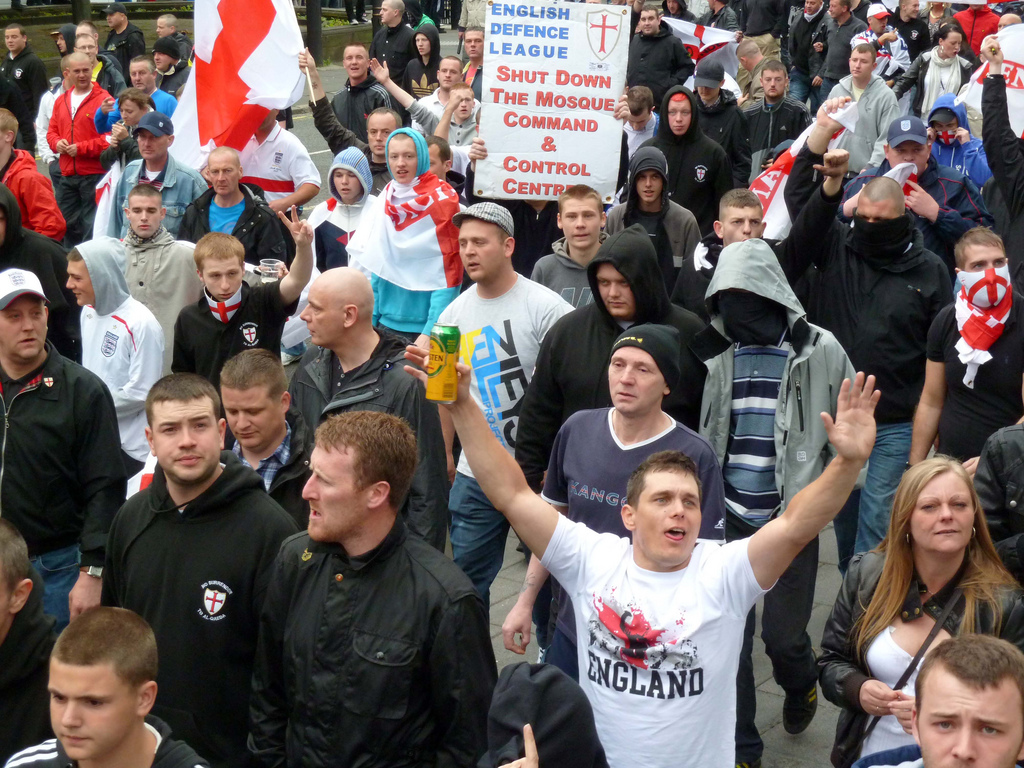
The English Defence League (demonstration pictured) was established by activists with BNP links, although the BNP has officially proscribed the group, accusing it of being manipulated by "Zionists".

Britain's extreme-right has long faced internal and public divisions. Disgruntled BNP members left the party to found or join a wide range of rivals, among them the British Freedom Party, White Nationalist Party, Nationalist Alliance, Wolf's Hook White Brotherhood, British People's Party, England First Party, Britain First, Democratic Nationalists, and the New Nationalist Party. Various BNP members were involved in the nascent English Defence League (EDL)—with EDL leader Tommy Robinson having been a former BNP activist—although Griffin proscribed the organisation and condemned it as having been manipulated by "Zionists". The political scientist Chris Allen noted that the EDL shared much of the BNP's ideology, but that its "strategies and actions" were very different, with the EDL favouring street marches over electoral politics. By 2014, both the BNP and EDL were in decline, and Britain First—founded by former BNP members James Dowson and Paul Golding—had risen to prominence. It combined the electoral tactics of the BNP with the street marches of the EDL.

The Steadfast Trust was established as a charity in 2004 with the stated aims of reducing poverty among those of Anglo-Saxon descent and supporting English culture. It has many former and current BNP, NF and British Ku Klux Klan members. It was deregistered as a charity by the Charity Commission in February 2014. In 2014, after Nick Griffin lost the leadership of BNP, he set up British Voice, but before it was launched, he decided to set up a different group, British Unity.

== Electoral performance ==
The BNP has contested seats in England, Wales, Scotland and Northern Ireland. Research from Robert Ford and Matthew Goodwin shows that BNP support is concentrated among older and less educated working-class men living in the declining industrial towns of the North and Midlands regions, in contrast to previous significant far-right parties like the National Front, which drew support from a younger demographic.

=== General elections ===
The BNP placed comparatively little emphasis on elections to the British House of Commons, aware that the first past the post voting system was a major obstacle.

The British National Party has contested general elections since 1983. It put forward no candidates for the 2024 general election.

Year	No. of candidates	No. of MPs	% vote	Total votes	Change (% points)	Average votes per candidate
1983	54	0	0.0	14,621	—N/a	271
1987	2	0	0.0	563	0.0	282
1992	13	0	0.1	7,631	+0.1	587
1997	54	0	0.1	35,832	0.0	664
2001	33	0	0.2	47,129	+0.1	1,428
2005	117	0	0.7	192,746	+0.5	1,647
2010	339	0	1.9	563,743	+1.2	1,663
2015	8	0	0.0	1,667	−1.9	208
2017	10	0	0.0	4,642	+0.0	464
2019	1	0	0.0	510		510

The BNP in the 2001 general election saved five deposits (out of 33 contested seats) and secured its best general election result in Oldham West and Royton (which had recently been the scene of racially motivated rioting between white and Asian youths) where party leader Nick Griffin secured 16% of the vote.

The 2005 general election was considered a major breakthrough by the BNP, as it received 192,746 votes in the 119 constituencies it contested, took a 0.7% share of the overall vote and retained a deposit in 40 of the seats.

The BNP put forward candidates for 338 out of 650 seats for the 2010 general election gaining 563,743 votes (1.9%), finishing in fifth place and failing to win any seats. However, a record of 73 deposits were saved. Party chairman Griffin came third in the Barking constituency, behind Margaret Hodge of Labour and Simon Marcus of the Conservatives, who were first and second respectively. At 14.6%, this was the BNP's best result in any of the seats it contested that year.

=== Local elections ===
The BNP's first electoral success came in 1993, when Derek Beackon was returned as a councillor in Millwall, London. He lost his seat in elections the following year. The next BNP success in local elections was not until the 2002 local elections, when three BNP candidates gained seats on the Burnley council. The BNP's first councillor for six years was John Haycock, elected as a parish councillor for Bromyard and Winslow in Herefordshire in 2000. Haycock failed to attend any council meetings for six months and was later disqualified from office.

The party had 55 councillors for a time in 2009. After the 2013 local county council elections, the BNP was left with a total of two borough councillors in England.

As of 2011, the BNP had yet to make "a major breakthrough" on local councils. The BNP's councillors usually had "an extremely limited impact on local politics" because they were isolated as individuals or small groups on the council. Councillors from the main parties often disliked their BNP colleagues and deemed having to work alongside them as an affront to dignity and decency. Questions were often raised as to whether BNP councillors could adequately represent the interests of all of their local constituents. On being elected, Beackon for instance stated that he refused to serve his Asian constituents in Millwall. There were also allegations made that BNP councillors had particularly low attendance at council meetings, although research indicated that this was not the case, with the BNP's attendance record being largely average.

There is evidence to suggest that racially and religiously motivated crime increased in those areas where BNP councillors had been elected. For instance, after the 1993 election of Beackon, there was a spike in racist attacks in the borough of Tower Hamlets. BNP members were directly responsible for some of this; the party's national organiser Richard Edmonds was sentenced to three months imprisonment for his part in an attack on a black man and his white girlfriend.

=== Regional assemblies and parliaments ===
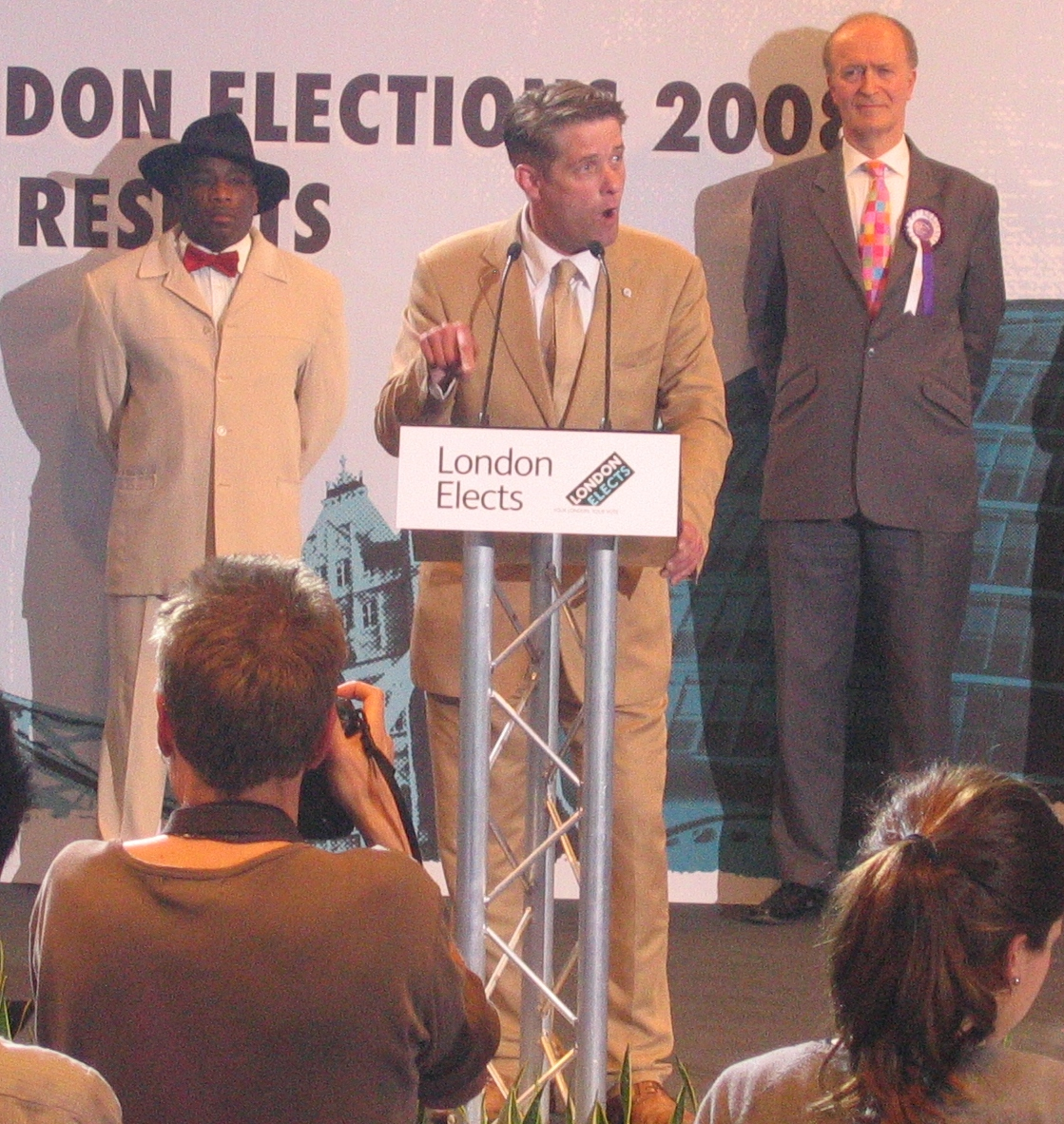
Barnbrook in 2008

BNP lead candidate Richard Barnbrook won a seat in the London Assembly in May 2008, after the party gained 5.3% of the London-wide vote. However, in August 2010, he resigned the party whip and became an independent.

In the 2007 Welsh Assembly elections, the BNP fielded 20 candidates, four in each of the five regional lists, with Nick Griffin standing in the South Wales West region. It did not win any seats, but was the only minor party to have saved deposits in the electoral regions, one in the North Wales region and the other in the South Wales West region. In total the BNP polled 42,197 votes (4.3%).

In the 2011 Welsh Assembly elections, the BNP fielded 20 candidates, four in each of the five regional lists and for the first time 7 candidates were fielded in FPTP constituencies. On the regional lists, the BNP polled 22,610 votes (2.4%), down 1.9% from 2007. In 2 out of the 7 FPTP constituencies contested the BNP saved deposits: (Swansea East and Islwyn).

In the 2007 Scottish Parliament election, the party fielded 32 candidates, entitling it to public funding and an election broadcast, prompting criticism. The BNP received 24,616 votes (1.2%), no seats were won, nor were any deposits saved. In the 2011 Scottish Parliament election, the BNP fielded 32 candidates in the regional lists. 15,580 votes were polled (0.78%).

The BNP fielded 3 candidates for the first time in three constituencies each in the 2011 Northern Ireland Legislative Assembly elections (Belfast East, East Antrim and South Antrim). 1,252 votes were polled (0.2%), winning no seats for the party.

=== European Parliament ===
The BNP first took part in European Parliament elections in 1999, when it received 1.13% of the total vote (102,647 votes).

In the 2004 elections to the European Parliament, the BNP won 4.9% of the vote, making it the sixth biggest party overall, but did not win any seats.

The BNP won two seats in the European Parliament in the 2009 elections. Andrew Brons was elected in the Yorkshire and the Humber regional constituency with 9.8% of the vote. Party chairman Nick Griffin was elected in the North West region, with 8% of the vote. Nationally, the BNP received 6.26%.

The UK government announced in 2009 that the BNP's two MEPs would be denied some of the access and information afforded to other MEPs. The BNP would be subject to the "same general principles governing official impartiality" and they would receive "standard written briefings as appropriate from time to time", but diplomats would not be "proactive" in dealing with the BNP MEPs and that any requests for policy briefings from them would be treated differently and on a discretionary basis.

The BNP did not stand any candidates in the 2019 European Parliament election in the United Kingdom.

European Parliament
Election year	# of total votes	% of overall vote	# of seats won	Change
1999	102,647	1.1%	0 / 87	0
2004	808,200 ▲	4.9% ▲	0 / 78	0
2009	943,598 ▲	6.3% ▲	2 / 72	2 ▲
2014	179,694 ▼	1.1% ▼	0 / 73	2 ▼

== Public profile ==
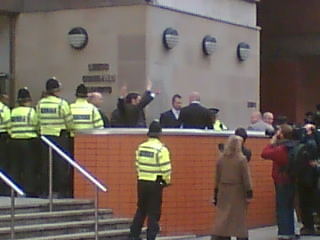
Nick Griffin and Mark Collett leave Leeds Crown Court on 10 November 2006 after being found not guilty of charges of incitement to racial hatred at their retrial.

=== Association with violence ===
The leaders and senior officers of the BNP have criminal convictions for inciting racial hatred. John Hagan claims that the BNP has conducted right-wing extremist violence to gain "institutionalized power". A 1997 report by Human Rights Watch accused the party of recruiting from skinhead groups and promoting racist violence.

In the past, Nick Griffin has defended the threat of violence to further the party's aims. After the BNP won its first council seat in 1993, he wrote that the BNP should not be a "postmodernist rightist party" but "a strong, disciplined organisation with the ability to back up its slogan 'Defend Rights for Whites' with well-directed boots and fists. When the crunch comes, power is the product of force and will, not of rational debate". In 1997 he said: "It is more important to control the streets of a city than its council chambers."

A BBC Panorama programme reported on a number of BNP members who have had criminal convictions, some racially motivated. Some of the more notable convictions include:

- John Tyndall had convictions for assault and organising paramilitary neo-Nazi activities. In 1986 he was jailed for conspiracy to publish material likely to incite racial hatred.
- In 1998, Nick Griffin was convicted of violating section 19 of the Public Order Act 1986, relating to incitement to racial hatred. He received a nine-month prison sentence, suspended for two years, and was fined £2,300.
- Joseph Owens, a BNP candidate in Liverpool's local elections, served eight months in prison for sending razor blades in the post to Jewish people and another term for carrying CS gas and knuckledusters.
- Colin Smith, who in 2004 was the BNP's South East London organiser, has 17 convictions for burglary, theft, possession of drugs and assaulting a police officer.
- Richard Edmonds, at the time BNP National Organiser, was sentenced to three months in prison in 1994 for his part in a racist attack. Edmonds threw a glass at the victim as he was walking past an East London pub where a group of BNP supporters was drinking. Others then 'glassed' the man in the face and punched and kicked him as he lay on the ground, including BNP supporter Stephen O'Shea, who was jailed for 12 months. Another BNP supporter, Simon Biggs, was jailed for four and a half years for his part in the attack.

Some members of the BNP were radicalised during their involvement with the party and subsequently sought to carry out acts of violence and terrorism. Tony Lecomber was imprisoned for three years for possessing explosives, after a nail bomb exploded while he was transporting it to the offices of the Workers' Revolutionary Party in 1985. He was imprisoned for three years in 1991 whilst serving as the BNP's Director of Propaganda for assaulting a Jewish teacher. In 1999, the ex-BNP member David Copeland used nail bombs to target homosexuals and ethnic minorities in London. In 2005, the BNP's Burnley candidate Robert Cottage was convicted of stockpiling chemicals for use in what he believed was a coming civil war, while a Yorkshire BNP member, Terry Gavan, was convicted in 2010 for stockpiling firearms and nail bombs.

=== Billy Brit ===
The Billy Brit character, as depicted in the video entitled "Heroes".

Billy Brit is a puppet character who has been used in YouTube videos by the youth wing of the BNP.

In one of the videos, titled "Heroes", the character recites a poem extolling a series of British figures: Boudicca, Edward I, William Shakespeare, Isaac Newton, Lord Nelson, the Duke of Wellington, Captain Scott, Enoch Powell and Nick Griffin. Every verse except for the one on Griffin ends with a statement that the individual was white. The "Heroes" video was criticised by Hari Kunzru of The Guardian. An episode of Have I Got News for You played a clip containing the Boudicca verse, prompting Stuart Maconie to jokingly comment "Pixar have gone really downhill, haven't they?". The puppet itself was not commissioned by the BNP but was a standard puppet bought off-the-shelf.

=== Reception ===
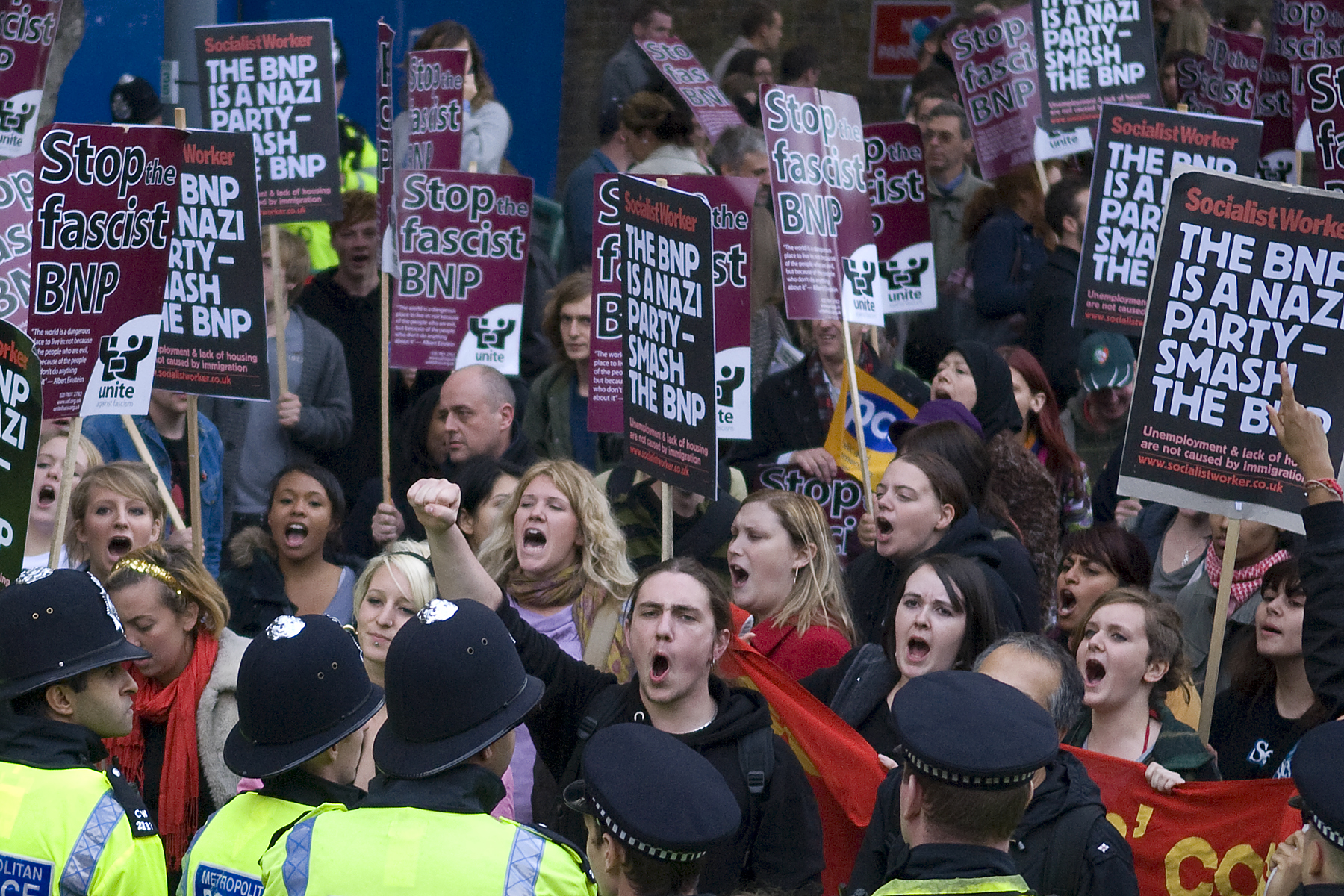
Protest against the BNP in 2009

In 2011, Goodwin described the BNP as being "the most successful party in the history of the extreme right in Britain". That same year, John E. Richardson noted that it had achieved "a level of electoral success that is unparalleled in the history of British fascism". The historian Alan Sykes stated that "in electoral terms", the BNP achieved "more in the first three years of the twenty-first century" than the British far right "as a whole achieved in the previous seventy". However, Copsey said that the party's belief that one day the conditions would be right for it to win a general election belonged to the "Never-Never Land of British politics". Copsey also said that the BNP's electoral successes had been modest in comparison to those achieved by extreme-right groups elsewhere in Western Europe such as France's National Front, Italy's National Alliance, and Belgium's Vlaams Blok.

The BNP's growth met a hostile reaction, and in 2011 the political scientists Copsey and Macklin described it as "Britain's most disliked party". It was widely reviled as racist and even following Griffin's "modernisation" project it was still heavily tainted by its associations with neo-Nazism. For many years it remained closely associated with the National Front in the British public imagination. The BNP remained unable to gain a broad appeal or widespread credibility. In a 2004 poll, seven out of ten voters said that they would never consider voting for the BNP. A 2009 poll found that two-thirds would "under no circumstances" consider voting BNP, while only 4% of respondents would "definitely consider" voting for them.

The Conservative leader Michael Howard stated that the BNP were a "stain" on British democracy, adding that "this is not a political movement, this is a bunch of thugs dressed up as a political party". His successor David Cameron described it as a "completely unacceptable" organisation which "thrives on hatred". The Labour prime minister, Tony Blair, called it a "nasty, extreme organisation", while the Liberal Democrat leader Nick Clegg termed it a "party of thugs and fascists". In 2004, the General Synod of the Church of England declared that supporting the BNP was incompatible with Christianity, comparing it to "spitting in the face of God". Christian groups throughout Britain have maintained that the BNP's hostility toward cultural and ethnic diversity in the country was at odds with mainstream Christianity's emphasis on inclusiveness, tolerance, and interfaith dialogue. Winston Churchill's family has criticised the BNP's use of his image and quotations, labelling it "offensive and disgusting". The singer Vera Lynn condemned the party for selling a CD featuring her recordings on its website. In 2009, the Royal British Legion asked Griffin—at first privately and then publicly—to not wear their poppy symbol.

The British police, Fire Brigades Union, and Church of England, prohibited its members from joining the BNP. In 2002, Martin Narey, banned BNP membership among prison workers; he subsequently received death threats. In 2010, the Education Secretary Michael Gove announced bans allowing headteachers to ban their staff from being party members. Individuals whose membership of the party was made public sometimes faced ostracism and the loss of their job: examples include a school headmaster who had to resign, a caretaker who was sacked after attending a BNP rally, and a police officer dismissed from his position. After BNP membership lists were leaked on the Internet, a number of police forces investigated officers whose names appeared on the lists.

In 2005, an invitation to Nick Griffin by the University of St Andrews Union Debating Society to participate in a debate on multiculturalism was withdrawn after protests. The BNP says that National Union of Journalists guidelines on reporting "far right" organisations forbid unionised journalists from reporting uncritically on the party. In April 2007, an election broadcast was cancelled by BBC Radio Wales whose lawyers believed that the broadcast was defamatory of the Chief Constable of North Wales Police, Richard Brunstrom. The BNP said that BBC editors were following an agenda.

==== Mainstream media and academia ====
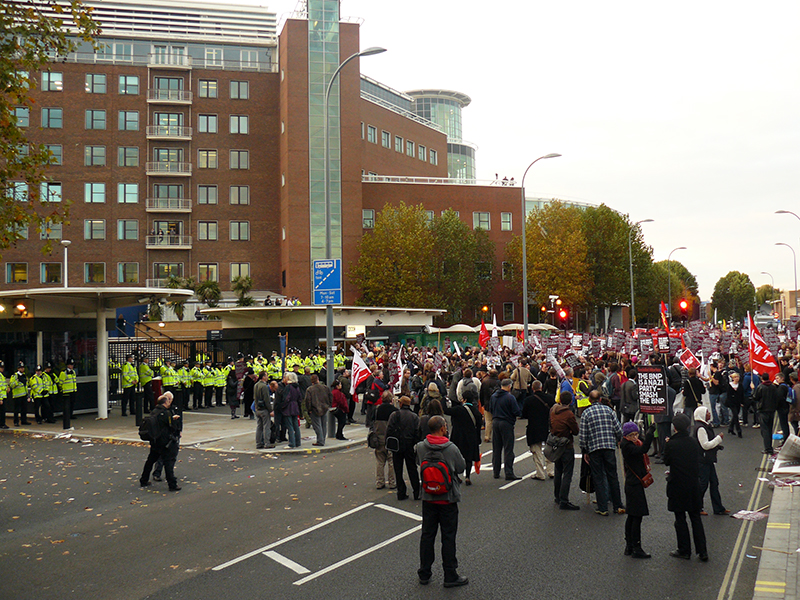
Protesters outside the BBC Television Centre, protesting against Griffin's invite to appear on Question Time

Attitudes toward the BNP in both mainstream broadcast media and print journalism have been overwhelmingly negative, and no mainstream newspaper has endorsed the party. This hostile coverage has even been found in right-wing tabloids like the Daily Mail, Daily Express and The Sun which otherwise share the BNP's hostile attitude toward issues like immigration. In 2003, the Daily Mail described the BNP as "poisonous bigots", while in 2004 The Sun printed the headline of "BNP: Bloody Nasty People". Senior BNP figures nevertheless believed that these tabloids' hostile coverage of immigration and Islam helped to legitimise and normalise the party and its views among much of the British public, a view echoed by some academic observers. When, in 2004, anti-racist activists picketed outside the Daily Mail office in central London to protest against its negative coverage of asylum seekers, BNP members organised a counter-picket at which they displayed the placard "Vote BNP, Read the Daily Mail".

The BNP initially faced a 'no platform for fascists' policy from the broadcast media, although this eroded as Griffin was invited on to a number of television programmes amid the party's growing electoral success. When the BBC invited him to appear on Question Time in 2009 it was criticised by several trade unions, sections of the media, and several Labour politicians, all of whom believed that the BNP should not be given a public platform. Anti-fascist protesters assembled outside of the television studio to protest Griffin's inclusion.

The first academic attention to be directed at the BNP appeared after it gained a councillor in the 1993 local elections. Nevertheless, throughout the 1990s it remained the subject of little academic research. Academic interest increased following its victories at local elections from 2002 onward. The first detailed monograph study to be devoted to the party was Nigel Copsey's Contemporary British Fascism, first published in 2004. In September 2008, an academic symposium on the BNP was held at Teesside University.

==== The wider extreme-right and anti-fascists ====
Opposition to the BNP also came from the organised anti-fascist movement. By the mid-1990s, the BNP's attempts to stage public events in Scotland, the North West and the Midlands were largely thwarted by the militant disruption of the Anti-Fascist Action (AFA) group. The BNP's modernisation and move away from street demonstrations and toward electoral campaigning caused problems for the AFA, who proved unable to successfully change their tactics; on those occasions when AFA activists tried to forcibly disrupt BNP activities, they were prevented and arrested by riot police.

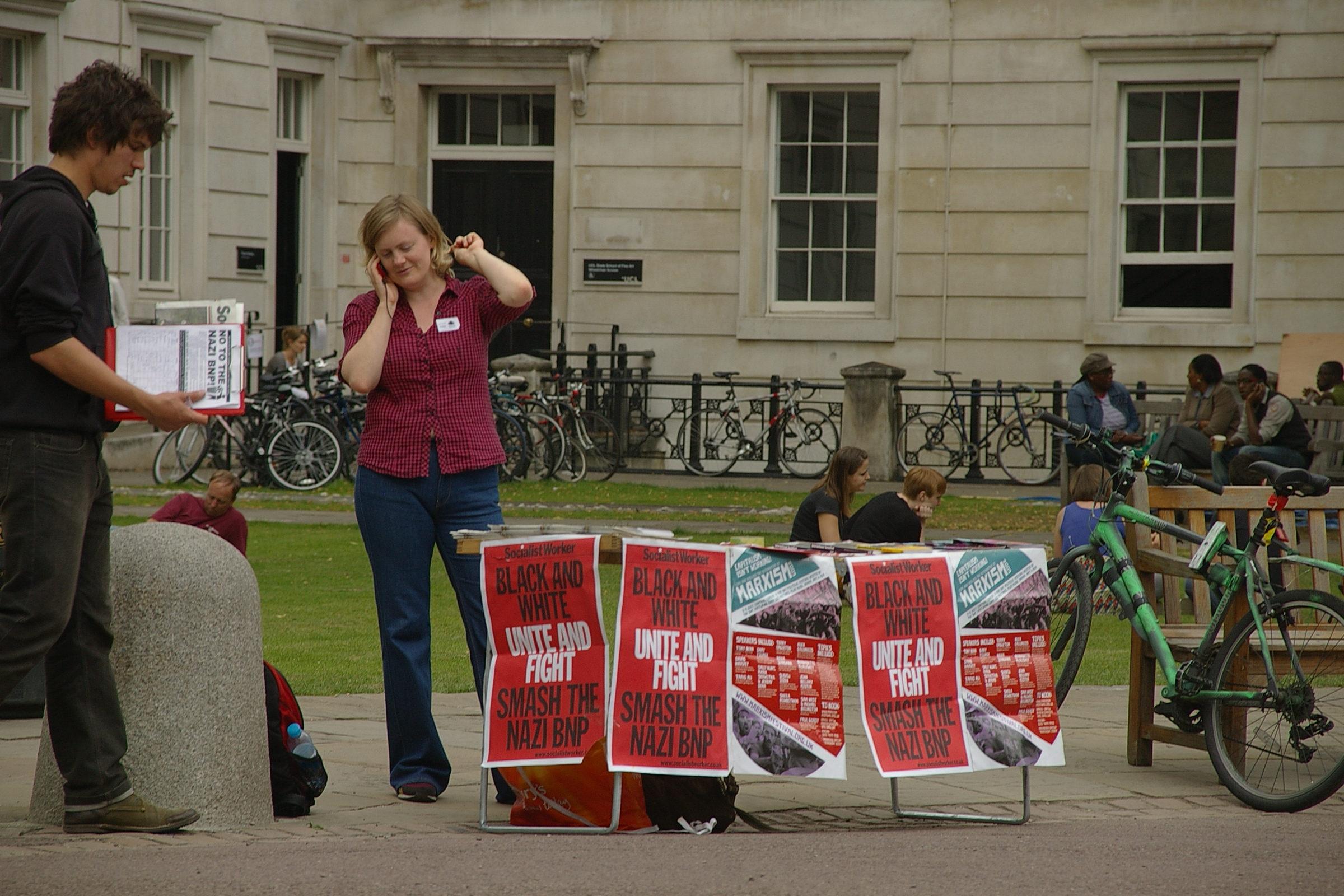
Activists belonging to the far-left Socialist Workers Party protesting against the BNP at University College London in 2009

More liberal sections of the anti-fascist movement sought to counter the BNP through community-based initiatives. Searchlight encouraged trade unions to establish localised campaigns that would ensure that ethnic minority and other anti-BNP locals voted. It suggested that such campaigns should avoid associating with the mainstream parties from which BNP voters felt disenfranchised and that they should not be afraid of calling out Islamic fundamentalists and extremists active in the area. The Unite Against Fascism group also sought to maximise anti-BNP turnout at elections, calling on the electorate to vote for "anyone but fascists". Evidence suggests that such anti-fascist activities did little to erode the far-right vote; this was in part because anti-fascist groups had encouraged the stereotype that BNP candidates were violent skinheads, something which conflicted with the more normal, friendly image that BNP activists cultivated when canvassing.

The BNP often received a hostile response from other sections of the British extreme-right. Some extreme-right-wingers, such as the British Freedom Party, expressed frustration at the party's inability to moderate itself further on the issue of race, while those such as Colin Jordan and the NF accused the BNP—particularly under Griffin's leadership—of being too moderate. This latter view was articulated by an extreme-right groupuscule, the International Third Position, when it said that the BNP "has been openly courting the Jewish vote and pumping out material which confirms what most us knew years ago: the BNP has become a multi-racist, Zionist, queer-tolerant anti-Muslim pressure group".

In ASLEF v. United Kingdom, the European Court of Human Rights overturned an employment appeal tribunal ruling that awarded BNP member and train driver Jay Lee damages for expulsion from a trade union. In Redfearn v United Kingdom, the court ruled that members of racist organisations could lawfully be dismissed on health and safety grounds if there was a danger of violence occurring in the workplace. In November 2012, the European Court of Human Rights made a majority ruling (4 to 3) that in Redfearn's case against the UK government, his rights under Article 11 (free association) had been infringed, but not those under Article 10 (free expression) or Article 14 (discrimination).

== See also ==
- List of political parties in the United Kingdom opposed to austerity
- Britain First
- English Defence League
