= Vavra (disambiguation) =

Vavra or Vávra is a Czech-language surname.

Vavra may also refer to:

- Vávra, Vavřa, a diminutive of the Czech name Vavřinec, a Czech calque of the name Laurentius
  - Vávra Suk, Swedish politician
- 3732 Vávra, main-belt asteroid
