= National Democratic Youth =

National Democratic Youth Nationaldemokratisk Ungdom
- Chairperson: Andreas Nyberg
- Founded: 2 February 2002
- Dissolved: April 2014
- Ideology: Ultranationalism, Ethnopluralism
- Mother party: National Democrats
- Website: www.ndu.nu

National Democratic Youth (Swedish: Nationaldemokratisk Ungdom, NDU) was the youth organization of the now-defunct Swedish political party National Democrats (Swedish: Nationaldemokraterna).

== History ==
NDU was formed during spring 2002 and has taken a strong stance against multiculturalism, communism, homosexuality and feminism striving for a nation characterized by Nordic culture, tradition and national solidarity.

In 2003 the organisation performed a violent attack against the Gay pride-festival in Stockholm, where they began throwing bottles and beating the participators of the parade, this later resulted in the imprisonment of the chairman Marc Abramsson on the terms of battery and rioting.

NDU now suffered from internal conflicts and started a period of reconstruction when Andreas Wallentin replaced the leadership. A year later he resigned to have time for studies and to work as a writer for the party's newspaper Nationell Idag (National Today). Robert Almgren took over and continued the reformation, leading it out of all the setbacks and making it a prominent and rapid-growing youth organisation again, creating new divisions all over the country. The organization disbanded together with the party in April 2014.

== Organisation ==
The members of NDU concentrated most of their work on the local level, in their respective municipal organisations. These divisions were grouped together in regional districts with an organizer controlling the district's combined effort. The number of members was kept secret for safety reasons.

A congress was held annually to elect a chairman as highest authority of the youth league. In turn he appointed organizers and representatives for the regional groups. All the representatives together formed a national advisory council. In consultation between the chairman and the council the political manifesto and stance in factual matters was decided, in accordance with the parent party's ideological guidelines.

== List of chairpersons ==
- Marc Abramsson, 2001–2004
- Andreas Wallentin, 2004–2005
- Robert Almgren, 2005–2006
- Patrik Forsén, 2006–2007
- Andreas Nyberg, 2007–2009
