= Vávra =

Vávra (feminine: Vávrová) is a Czech surname, derived from the given name Vavřinec (a Czech variant of Lawrence). Notable people with the surname include:

- Dana Vávrová (1967–2009), Czech-German actress
- Daniel Vávra (born 1972), Czech video game writer, director and designer
- Greg Vavra (born 1961), Canadian football player
- Iva Vávrová (born 1943), Czech sprint canoeist
- Jiří Vávra (born 1975), Czech footballer
- Joe Vavra (born 1959), American baseball coach
- Josef Vávra (born 1984), Czech ice hockey player
- Lawrence Vavra (born 1977), American music manager
- Michaela Vávrová (rower) (born 1974), Czech rower
- Michaela Vávrová (golfer) (born 2000), Slovak golfer
- Otakar Vávra (1911–2011), Czech film director and screenwriter
- Robert Vavra (born 1935), American photographer
- Stanislav Vávra (born 1993), Czech footballer
- Terrin Vavra (born 1997), American baseball player
- Vladimír Vávra (1905–1932), Czech wrestler
- Zdeněk Vávra (1891–1947), Czech fencer
- Zdeňka Vávrová (born 1945), Czech astronomer

== See also ==
- Vávra Suk
- Vavra (disambiguation)
