= Powellism =

British right-wing ideology

Powellism is the name given to the political views of Conservative and Ulster Unionist politician Enoch Powell. They derive from his High Tory and libertarian outlook.

According to the Oxford English Dictionary, the word Powellism was coined by The Economist on 17 July 1965. However, the day before, Iain Macleod had reviewed a book of Powell's speeches entitled A Nation Not Afraid in The Spectator in which he mentioned the word:

Enoch Powell has the finest mind in the House of Commons. The best trained and the most exciting. There is an attitude of mind which can be called "Powellism" and it is excellent that now we have the evidence collected in a book.

The word was originally used to describe Powell's views on economics. Powell offered his own definition: "[Powellism is] an almost unlimited faith in the ability of the people to get what they want through peace, capital, profit and a competitive market".

== Nationalism ==
Powell was a romantic British nationalist and viewed the nation state as "the ultimate political reality". He believed the British Parliament to be the expression of the British nation and his opposition to British membership of the European Economic Community stemmed from his belief that it would abolish the sovereignty of the British nation state.

His views on Britain's relations with the rest of the world derived ultimately from the belief in the independent nation state. The United Nations, to Powell, was an "absurdity and a monstrosity" by its very nature because it sought to preserve the international status quo without the use of force, whereas he believed that war was necessary for sovereign nations to exist.

=== Immigration ===
Powell's opposition to mass immigration derived from his belief that the majority of immigrants could not be decisively assimilated and from his nationalist outlook.

=== Northern Ireland ===
Roy Lewis stated that for Powell, the situation in Northern Ireland "went down to the roots of his position on nationhood, on British national identity, on the uniqueness of parliamentary government". Powell considered the unionist majority in Northern Ireland to be "part of the nation which inhabits the rest of the United Kingdom" and that Northern Ireland should remain in the United Kingdom.

Powell considered those who committed crimes because they believed, "however mistaken", that they were thereby helping to safeguard their country's integrity and their right to live under the Crown to be "breaches the peace". Powell also disagreed with the notion that members of the British Army were "glorified policeman", designed solely to keep order between two warring sides.

Powell, despite earlier supporting the Northern Irish Parliament and even redrawing the Irish border to reduce the number of Northern Ireland's Irish nationalists, advocated that Northern Ireland should be politically integrated with the rest of the United Kingdom, treated no differently from its other constituent parts. He believed that successive British governments, under American pressure, were determined to make Northern Ireland join an all-Ireland state, one way or another.

=== European Economic Community ===
Powell had supported British membership of the EEC in 1961, when then Conservative Prime Minister, Harold Macmillan, applied unsuccessfully for Britain to join, as Powell believed it to be a way to make Britain liberalise its economy. However, Powell changed his mind soon after when investigating the EEC's origins and methods in greater detail, and believed that Britain joining the EEC would extinguish Britain's ability to be a self-governing nation. Powell said that the question of British membership of the EEC "must be the question which subtends all others...for – in peace as in war, it is the great, the ultimate, question for any nation".

The EEC question was the issue that would cause Powell to leave the Conservative Party on 23 February 1974, as Conservative Prime Minister, Edward Heath, had taken Britain into the EEC on 1 January 1973 without an electoral mandate from British voters. Powell leaving the Conservative Party came just 5 days before the general election took place. After his resignation, Powell then shocked his former Conservative colleagues by calling on the public to vote for the Labour Party, as Labour were offering a referendum on EEC membership. Powell placed the EEC question above all other matters since it eroded national sovereignty in an unprecedented way that had not been known since the English Reformation; EEC law had primacy over law made in the British Parliament, which Powell considered to be the true representation of the British nation, with the British monarch as its head.

=== Devolution ===
Powell opposed devolution to Scotland and Wales because of his British nationalism and because he believed devolution to be incompatible with the unitary nature of the British state. Powell stated that it was impossible for the same electorate to be represented in two legislative houses unless Britain became a federal state. Powell wanted the British nation to be represented in one parliament. Powell believed that they should become independent sovereign states outside the United Kingdom if the Scottish and Welsh considered themselves to be separate nations from the English and the Northern Irish.

=== British Empire and the Commonwealth ===
Powell had originally supported the British Empire and wanted to keep British rule in India. After he had failed, he opposed British membership in the empire's successor, the Commonwealth of Nations. He believed that by leaving the empire and becoming independent, the new countries' affairs were no longer Britain's responsibility or in its national interest. Powell believed that after the end of the empire, patriotism should be derived from the patria, the nation state, regardless of the racial composition of foreign states.

=== Mau Mau Rebellion ===
Powell was one of the few MPs who campaigned against the brutality of British troops in combating the Mau Mau rebellion. He called for British troops guilty of atrocities to be punished.

=== United States ===
Powell believed that the US was against Northern Ireland being part of the UK because it wanted a reunified Ireland within NATO to help combat the Soviet Union. Powell thought that Northern Ireland should be integrated with the rest of the UK and treated no differently from the rest of it. He also blamed the US for the dissolution of the British Empire and for the British decline of influence in international affairs.

=== Unilateral nuclear disarmament ===
Powell earlier supported British owning their own nuclear weapons. However, after his ministerial career, he rejected the view given by successive British government that nuclear weapons deterred Russia from conquering the countries of Western Europe and that as the nuclear weapons were mainly American, British security rested on "the American alliance and American armament".

Powell believed that even if the Soviet Union had wanted to, it would not have dared to invade Western Europe "for one simple overwhelming reason: it would have meant a war they couldn't expect to win" against the United States. Powell said that the nuclear deterrent was "a pretend deterrent" and argued that the existence of separate nuclear weapons for France and the United Kingdom showed that they believed that the United States would not risk a nuclear war over Western Europe. He also said that they were "victims to their own reasoning" since neither would themselves use nuclear weapons in the event of an invasion because the consequences of nuclear war would be too horrific. Powell supported unilateral nuclear disarmament also because he disagreed with the notion that nuclear weapons prevented nuclear blackmail since Britain would have to choose between "unlimited devastation" or surrender.

== Economic views ==
Powell was staunchly anti-interventionist in economic and monetary affairs. He believed that business interests should be looked after by the people that best understood them – businessmen – not politicians. Having criticised conventions on business practice organised or funded by the government, he was the first major politician to call for de-nationalision of public services in the 1960s.

== Social views ==
Powell's social views differed from those of his conservative allies in that he supported no-fault divorce and other aspects of the (so-called) permissive society put forth by Labour. Powell supported the maintenance of monarchy, established religion and hereditary peers in governance. He voted to decriminalise homosexuality and did not regard "it as a proper area for the criminal law to operate".

His views on forms of punishment, judiciary and educational were not those of most contemporary or even present-day Conservatives. He described the death penalty as "utterly repugnant" and voted consistently against corporal punishment in schools.

== Distinction from related philosophies ==
=== Differences from Thatcherism ===
Margaret Thatcher, during her terms as Prime Minister between 1979 and 1990, based many of her defining policies along the lines of Powell's rhetoric. However, while they shared between them a desire for the denationalisation of industries, their methods of going about this were considerably different. Thatcher desired to severely limit the power of trade unions by defeating them in open industrial showdowns, most notably with the miners' strike showdown against the NUM, whereas Powell defended labour unions and desired to build unity with the working class by winning over trade unionists to monetarist policies through logic, intelligence, and political arguments that were in opposition to socialist arguments.

Enoch Powell advocated for the voluntary repatriation of Commonwealth immigrants, arguing that generous payments should be put in place by the government of the day to encourage non-white immigrants to return to the countries of their birth. This is something the governments of Margaret Thatcher never advocated for or introduced.

The greatest schism of all between Powell and Thatcher, however, lies in foreign affairs. Powell's sentiment on Britain as part of the wider world would be more in line with Salisbury's "splendid isolation" than Thatcher's Atlanticism. Powell was a well-travelled man who spoke over a dozen languages, but his foreign policy of supporting Britain the nation-state did not align with the stereotypical view some may hold of a man who was well-travelled and spoke so many languages. While Thatcher was a believer in the special relationship with the United States, Powell saw the United States and Britain as rivals, not as allies.

Another foreign policy divide between Powell and Thatcher concerned their opinions and timings on the European Economic Community (EEC), as Thatcher was an enthusiastic supporter of Britain being a member of the EEC in the 1970s and the early 1980s, including being one of the figureheads behind the winning "Yes" campaign for Britain to stay in the EEC during the 1975 referendum, whereas Powell had been one of the figureheads of the losing "No" campaign to leave the EEC during the 1975 referendum. It was not until the late 1980s and into 1990 that Thatcher started expressing her increasing concern about the EEC's project to political and monetary union, whereas this was something that Powell had criticising since the mid 1960s when he started openly opposing the EEC and the perception that there would be a loss of British sovereignty from it.

Powell distanced himself philosophically from Thatcher. Notably, when it was remarked to him that she was a convert to Powellism, Powell replied: "A pity she never understood it!"

=== Divergence from libertarianism ===
Ralph Harris of the Institute of Economic Affairs wrote to Powell claiming that his views on immigration were antagonistic to the rest of his generally-libertarian views, but Powell disagreed with that notion.

== Books on Powellism ==
- Rex Collings (ed.), Reflections of a Statesman: The Writings and Speeches of Enoch Powell (London: Bellew, 1991).
- Roy Lewis, Enoch Powell: Principle in Politics (London: Cassell, 1979).
- T. E. Utley, Enoch Powell: The Man and his Thinking (London: William Kimber, 1968).
- John Wood (ed.), A Nation Not Afraid: The Thinking of Enoch Powell (B. T. Batsford, 1965).
