= 2002 Burnley Borough Council election =

2002 English local election

Results of the 2002 Burnley Borough Council election

Elections to Burnley Borough Council in Lancashire, England were held on 2 May 2002. Due to a reorganisation, most of the electoral wards had boundary changes and some were replaced, only Lanehead and Briercliffe wards where unaffected. Also the number of seats was reduced to 45, resulting that the entire council was up for election. In each ward, voters where required to elect 3 councillors, with first place receiving a full 4-year term, second receiving 2 years and third, a single year. The Labour party retained control of the council.

After the election, the composition of the council was

- Labour 27
- Liberal Democrat 8
- Conservative 4
- British National Party 3
- Independent (politician) 3

== Election result ==
Burnley local election result 2002
Party	Seats	Gains	Losses	Net gain/loss	Seats %	Votes %	Votes	+/−
Labour	27	27	0	27	60	48.7	41,327	
Liberal Democrats	8	8	0	8	17.7	17.0	14,411	
Conservative	4	4	0	4	8.9	8.8	7,497	
Independent	3	3	0	3	6.7	12.9	10,924	
BNP	3	3	0	3	6.7	11.8	9,984	
Socialist Alliance	0	0	0	0	0	0.8	738	

== Ward results ==
Bank Hall (3)
Party	Candidate	Votes	%	±%
Labour	Patricia Bennett	1,216	24.3	
Labour	Barry Guttridge	1,139	22.8	
Labour	Caroline Kavanagh	1,052	21.1	
BNP	Joan Dewhurst	663	13.3	
Liberal Democrats	Abdul Hamid	503	10.1	
Liberal Democrats	Doctor Simba	422	8.4	
Majority				
Turnout		4,995		

Briercliffe (3)
Party	Candidate	Votes	%	±%
Liberal Democrats	Roger Frost	1,302	25.2	
Liberal Democrats	Margaret Lishman	1,214	23.5	
Liberal Democrats	Peter McCann	1,058	20.4	
Labour	Laurence Embley	549	10.6	
Labour	John Titherington	526	10.2	
Labour	John Hartley	525	10.1	
Majority				
Turnout		5,174		

Brunshaw (3)
Party	Candidate	Votes	%	±%
Labour	Donald Hall	1,435	26.4	
Labour	Lilian Clark	1,312	24.1	
Labour	David Halsall	1,177	21.7	
BNP	Simon Bennett	919	16.9	
Independent	Cliff Tahir	593	10.9	
Majority				
Turnout		5,463		

Cliviger with Worsthorne (3)
Party	Candidate	Votes	%	±%
Conservative	David Heginbotham	1,032	14.8	
BNP	David Edwards	898	12.8	
Independent	Kevin Robinson	817	11.8	
Conservative	Tony Walker	801	11.4	
Conservative	Alan Stewart	711	10.2	
Labour	Fiona Burns	694	9.9	
Labour	Philip Walsh	693	9.9	
Labour	Marguerite Walsh	678	9.7	
Independent	Nigel Musker	666	9.5	
Majority				
Turnout		6,990		

Coalclough with Deerplay (3)
Party	Candidate	Votes	%	±%
Liberal Democrats	Gordon Birtwistle	1,335	24.2	
Liberal Democrats	Charles Bullas	1,117	20.3	
Liberal Democrats	Patricia Smith	1,043	18.9	
BNP	Leonard Starr	622	11.3	
Labour	Anthony Davis	394	7.2	
Independent	Nigel Musker	389	7.1	
Labour	Mary Roberts	340	6.2	
Labour	Mohammed Baig	265	4.8	
Majority				
Turnout		5,505		

Daneshouse with Stoneyholme (3)
Party	Candidate	Votes	%	±%
Labour	Mohammad Malik	1,461	20.8	
Liberal Democrats	Mozaquir Ali	1,336	19.0	
Liberal Democrats	Manzoor Hussain	1,256	17.9	
Labour	Saeed Chaudhary	934	13.3	
Labour	Shahi Sultan	643	9.1	
Independent	Kazmi Hussain	453	6.4	
Liberal Democrats	Masood Mirza	368	5.3	
Independent	Wendy Leach	343	4.9	
Independent	Edward Fisk	230	3.3	
Majority				
Turnout		7,024		

Gannow (3)
Party	Candidate	Votes	%	±%
Labour	Michael Rushton	882	16.2	
Labour	Alice Thornber	842	15.4	
BNP	Terence Grogan	817	15.0	
Labour	Patrick Tierney	813	14.9	
Independent	Fred Melbourne	726	13.3	
Independent	Ian Nelson	690	12.7	
Conservative	Jeffrey Pickup	529	9.7	
Socialist Alliance	Ian Alderson	151	2.8	
Majority				
Turnout		5,450		

Gawthorpe (3)
Party	Candidate	Votes	%	±%
Labour	Frank Cant	1,012	18.7	
Labour	Gillian Harbour	995	18.4	
Labour	Linda Gauton	868	16.0	
BNP	Andrew Kenyon	783	14.5	
Independent	Patricia Stinton	723	13.4	
Independent	Patricia Lord	635	11.7	
Conservative	Laura Dowding	395	7.3	
Majority				
Turnout		5,411		

Hapton with Park (3)
Party	Candidate	Votes	%	±%
Labour	Kevin Birchall	1,140	21.9	
Labour	John Harbour	1,095	21.0	
Labour	Andrew Tatchell	1,043	20.1	
BNP	John Kenyon	722	13.9	
Independent	Steven Gourlay	605	11.6	
Liberal Democrats	Mary McCann	596	11.5	
Majority				
Turnout		5,201		

Lanehead (3)
Party	Candidate	Votes	%	±%
Independent	Paula Riley	984	18.7	
Labour	John Cavanagh	978	18.6	
Labour	Brian Cooper	871	16.5	
Liberal Democrats	Martin Smith	846	16.1	
BNP	Sarah Sherburn	834	15.9	
Labour	David Lord	748	14.2	
Majority				
Turnout		5,261		

Queensgate (3)
Party	Candidate	Votes	%	±%
Labour	Peter Kenyon	1,164	23.9	
Labour	Paul Moore	1,075	22.1	
Labour	Mohammad Najib	1,002	20.5	
Liberal Democrats	Denise Embra	852	17.5	
BNP	David Haworth	781	16.0	
Majority				
Turnout		4,874		

Rosegrove with Lowerhouse (3)
Party	Candidate	Votes	%	±%
Labour	Stuart Caddy	841	16.1	
Independent	Marlene Disley	751	14.4	
BNP	Carol Hughes	751	14.4	
Labour	Stephen Reynolds	729	14.0	
Independent	Arthur Wilkinson	723	13.8	
Labour	Stephen Wolski	721	13.8	
Independent	Samuel Holgate	706	13.5	
Majority				
Turnout		5,222		

Rosehill with Burnley Wood (3)
Party	Candidate	Votes	%	±%
Labour	Colette Bailey	1,106	18.8	
Labour	Denis Otter	1,083	18.4	
Labour	Janice Swainston	1,013	17.3	
Independent	John Lloyd	890	15.1	
BNP	James Cowell	812	13.8	
Conservative	David Tierney	660	11.2	
Socialist Alliance	Stephen Worden	314	5.4	
Majority				
Turnout		5,878		

Trinity (3)
Party	Candidate	Votes	%	±%
Labour	Carole Galbraith	1,022	23.4	
Labour	Anthony Lambert	914	20.9	
Labour	Elizabeth Monk	897	20.5	
BNP	Mark Terrell	643	14.7	
Liberal Democrats	William Bennett	626	14.3	
Socialist Alliance	Tess McMahon	273	6.2	
Majority				
Turnout		4,375		

Whittlefield with Ightenhill (3)
Party	Candidate	Votes	%	±%
Conservative	Josephine Challinor	1,166	17.7	
Conservative	Peter Doyle	1,112	16.9	
Conservative	Ida Fowler	1,091	16.6	
BNP	Mark Vickers	739	11.2	
Labour	Jean Daiches	670	10.2	
Labour	Antony Martin	641	9.8	
Labour	Hilary Ward	617	9.4	
Liberal Democrats	Paul Wright	537	8.2	
Majority				
Turnout		6,573		
