= Vávra Suk =

Swedish politician (born 1973)

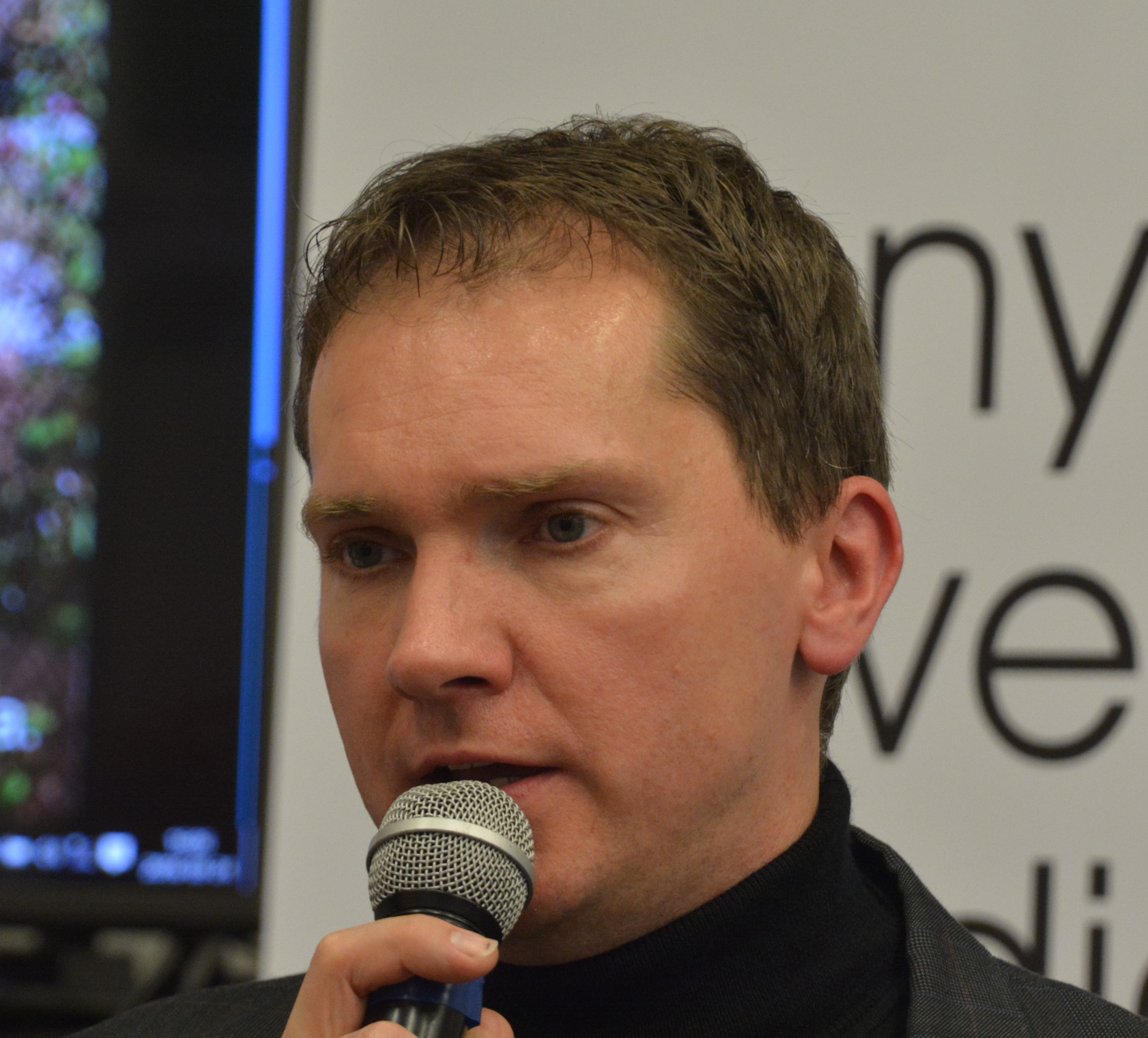
- Suk in 2016

Party secretary of National Democrats
- In office 12 August 2001 – October 2012
- Preceded by: Party established

Personal details
- Born: Vávra Suk; 18 March 1973 (age 53) Prague, Czechoslovakia
- Other political affiliations: Sweden Democrats; National Democrats (until 2012)
- Education: KTH Royal Institute of Technology; Stockholm University

Vávra Suk (born 18 March 1973 in Prague, Czechoslovakia) is a nationalist politician in Sweden. He was previously the party secretary of the National Democrats, a party which he co-founded in 2001 in a breakaway from the Sweden Democrats. He was the editor of the National Democrat's newspaper Nationell Idag until 2012. In late 2012, he became the editor of the newly founded Nya Tider. He is the registered owner of the domain for Free West Media.
