= National Democrats (Sweden) =

National Democrats Nationaldemokraterna
- Abbreviation: ND
- Leader: Marc Abramsson
- Founded: 12 August 2001
- Dissolved: 23 April 2014
- Split from: Sweden Democrats
- Headquarters: Stockholm
- Newspaper: Nationell Idag
- Youth wing: National Democratic Youth
- Ideology: Ultranationalism; Right-wing populism Ethnopluralism; Third Position; Anti-communism; Anti-capitalism
- Political position: Far-right
- European affiliation: Euronat; Alliance of European National Movements
- Colours: Orange

Party flag
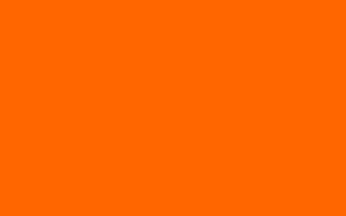

The National Democrats (Nationaldemokraterna, ND) were a political party in Sweden, formed by a radical faction of national board of the Sweden Democrats (SD) in October 2001 after they were expelled from the SD. The party described itself as a democratic nationalist and ethnopluralist party. The party disbanded on 23 April 2014.

In the 2002 general election the party received 9,248 votes, far below the 4% threshold necessary for parliamentary representation. In the 2006 general election, the party received 3,064 votes (0.06%); however, they had representation in two municipalities south of Stockholm. In the 2010 general election, the party received 1,141 votes (0.02%). The chairman of the party was Marc Abramsson.

On 2 February 2008, the old party logo consisting of a blue and yellow sail was replaced with an orange cloudberry flower.

== History ==
The party's initial leadership was composed of individuals who left the Sweden Democrats, criticizing the party for its shift toward right-wing populism and for diminishing the emphasis on ethnicity within its nationalist ideology. At its founding, the National Democrats established four permanent statutes outlining the party's commitment to national democratic ethnopluralism. The party adopted blue and yellow as its colors and chose a blue-and-yellow sail as its symbol.

Anders Steen was elected the first party leader of the National Democrats, while his stepson, Tor Paulsson, was chosen as party organizer. Marc Abramsson was elected chairman of the National Democratic Youth (NDU), and Vávra Suk was appointed party secretary and chief ideologue.

In the general elections in 2002, the National Democrats received 4,122 votes in the parliamentary and four municipal council seats - two in Haninge municipality and two in Södertälje municipality. The party ran a no-campaign during the referendum on the introduction of the euro as a currency, and in the 2004 European elections, the National Democrats received 7,209 votes, corresponding to 0.29 percent of the vote. After midsummer 2004, the party suffered a major scandal after party organizer Tor Paulsson was arrested by police for assault, something that received special attention when the assailant was Paulsson's cohabitant and Paulsson himself condemned Muslim men's violence against women. In December of the same year, Paulsson deviated from an unattended leave, which led to his being called.

Subsequent internal conflicts caused significant portions of the organization to collapse, with many active members and local branches becoming inactive. The conflicts escalated further when party leader Anders Steen introduced a motion in Haninge's municipal council advocating for stronger measures against anti-Semitism. The party had previously expressed support for the Palestinian struggle for a national state, which sparked criticism of the motion. Critics interpreted it as tacit support for Israeli policies. Shortly thereafter, Steen left the party, along with the Haninge local branch.

At an extraordinary Riksdag meeting on 3 October 2004, Tomas Johansson was elected the new party leader for the National Democrats, and Marc Abramsson became the new party organizer, which contributed to closer cooperation with the newly formed Freedom Party. On December 9, 2005, the Freedom Party joined the National Democrats, and Nils-Eric Hennix was elected new party leader. Hennix introduced two new points in the program of principles, which concerned demands for large tax cuts, as well as increased animal welfare. In the 2006 election The National Democrats received 3,064 votes in the parliamentary elections, which corresponds to 0.06 percent of the votes. The party also received three municipal council seats - two in Södertälje municipality and one in Nykvarn municipality. Shortly afterwards, Hennix resigned as party leader due to illness, and was replaced by Abramsson.

In realpolitik, the party moved toward a left-wing nationalist stance but maintained its demands for enhanced animal protection. On February 2, 2008, the party held a relaunch in Stockholm, adopting orange as its new color and the cloudberry flower as its new symbol. An exception to its strictly independent policy was the party's participation in the Salem March. After previous conflicts with the organizers in the Salem Fund, the demonstration adopted a more populist tone that the party could support.

During Abramsson's work as organizer and party leader, ties to other European national democratic parties, mainly the German NPD and British BNP but also the northern Italian Lega Nord, have also been strengthened.

In the 2010 parliamentary elections , the National Democrats received 1,141 votes, which corresponds to 0.02 percent of the votes, 1,923 fewer (a decline of 0.04 percentage points) than in the 2006 parliamentary elections where the party received 3,064 or 0.06 percent of the electorate's votes cast. The National Democrats won 2 municipal seats in Södertälje and 1 in Nykvarn.

Just before the 2011 Riksdag meeting, Deputy Party leader Daniel Spansk left the National Democrats together with three others in a protest against party leader Marc Abramsson's leadership style.

== Ideology ==
ND's ideology was described as xenophobic and/or racist by the newspaper expressen. The party rejected these descriptions.

The party was critical of United States foreign policy and of NATO. The party also opposed what it called the "imperialist occupations of Serbia, Palestine, Iraq and Afghanistan."

== Electoral results ==
=== Parliament (Riksdag) ===
Election year	# of overall votes	% of overall vote	# of overall seats won	+/-	Notes
2002	9,248	0.17	0 / 349	New	No seats
2006	3,064	0.11	0 / 349	▼0	No seats
2010	1,141	0.02	0 / 349	▼0	No seats

== Leadership ==
=== Party leader ===
- Anders Steen (2001–2004)
- Tomas Johansson (2004–2005)
- Nils-Eric Hennix (2005–2006)
- Marc Abramsson (2006–2014)

== See also ==
- Conservative Party (1995–1999)
- Alternative for Sweden
- Party of the Swedes (2008–2015)
