= Permissive society =

Society in which social norms become more liberal

A permissive society, also referred to as permissive culture, is used to describe a society in which social norms become increasingly secular and liberal, especially with regard to violence, sexual freedom, and profanity. In Britain, the phrase "permissive society" is associated with the period 1964–70.

The term is often used pejoratively by cultural conservatives to criticise what is seen as a breakdown in traditional values, such as greater acceptance of premarital sex, an increase in divorce rates, and acceptance of non-traditional relationships such as cohabitation and homosexuality. A. P. Herbert, an English humorist, novelist, playwright, law reformist, and Member of Parliament, has been described as the "Father of the Permissive Society", particularly for his championing of the Matrimonial Causes Act 1937, which extended the grounds for divorce. It was particularly used during the sexual revolution which peaked in the early 1970s in Western culture by opponents of the changes in attitudes of the era.

== See also ==
- Cultural liberalism
