= Nationell Idag =

Swedish newspaper

- Type: Political periodical
- Format: Tabloid
- Editor: Patrik Ehn
- Founded: 2002
- Ceased publication: 2014
- Political alignment: National Democrats
- Headquarters: Stockholm
- Circulation: 1800
- ISSN: 1651-9671
- Website: www.nationellidag.se

Nationell Idag (National Today) was an independent Swedish periodical founded in 2002 by the now defunct extreme right-wing political party National Democrats. As of 2014, the paper described its platform as based on the ideology of the Sweden Democrat party. It was 16 pages long and was released once a week, reaching around 1800 readers. At the end of 2012 the paper lost state subsidy which was granted to it in 2010. The editor as of 2014 was Patrik Ehn.

The content of the periodical was based on political nationalism, criticism of multiculturalism and the Swedish immigration policy, and features about nationalist organisations in other countries.
