= United Kingdom anti-immigration protests (2025–present) =

- Part of far-right politics in the United Kingdom
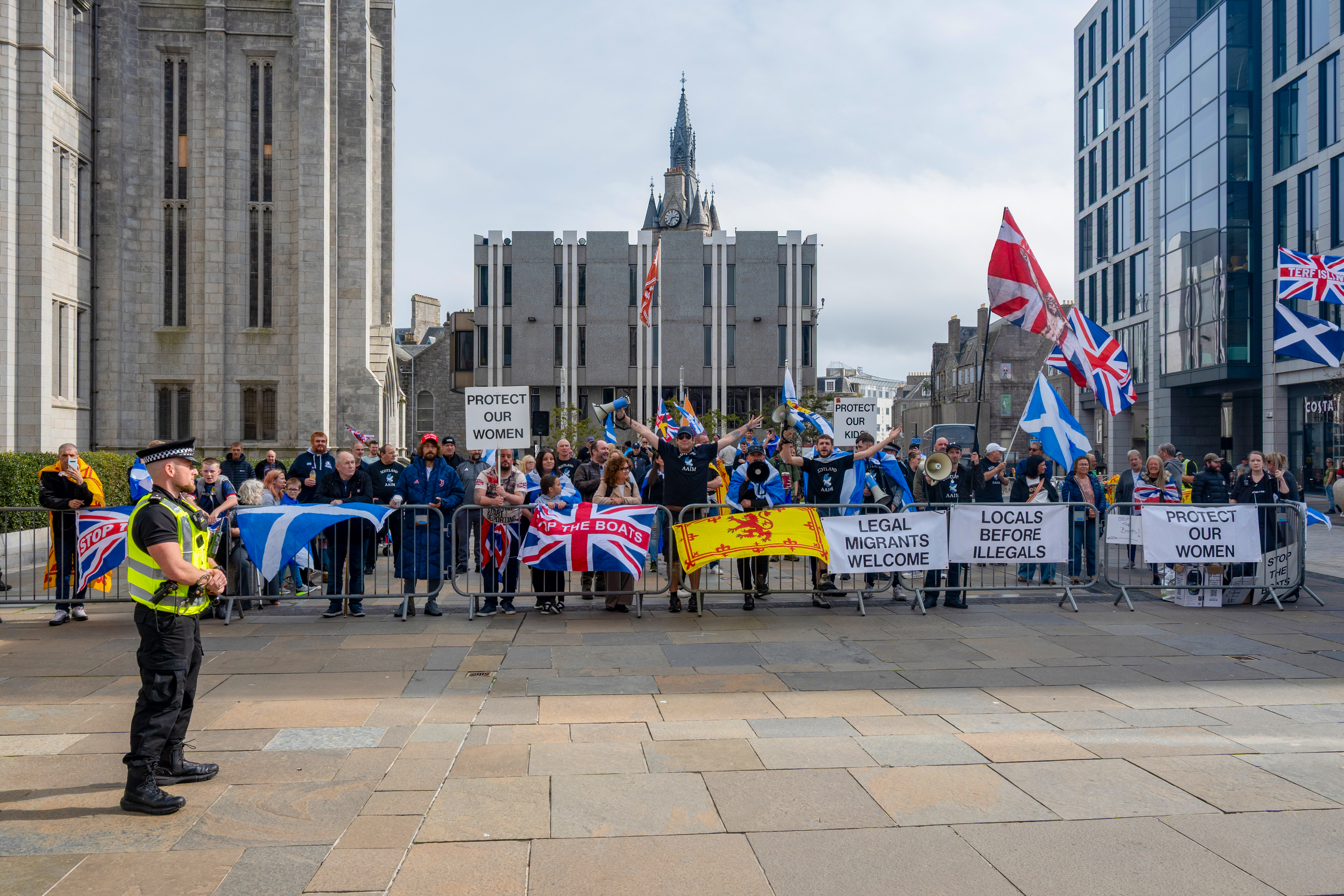
- Anti-immigration protest in Aberdeen, Scotland, on 6 September 2025
- Date: 1 February 2025 – present
- Location: Various places in the United Kingdom (Note: Aberdeen, Altrincham, Ashford, Ashington, Belfast, Blackpool, Bournemouth, Bowthorpe, Bristol, Cannock, Chadderton, Cheshunt, Chichester, Copthorne, Crick, Deanshanger, Diss, Dover, Dudley, Dundee, Edinburgh, Epping, Exeter, Falkirk, Faversham, Glasgow, Gloucester, Heywood, Horley, Hoylake, Hull, Leeds, Liverpool, London, Long Eaton, Maidstone, Manchester, Mansfield, Mold, Newark-on-Trent, Newcastle upon Tyne, Newtown, Newtownabbey, Nuneaton, Orpington, Oxford, Perth, Peterborough, Plymouth, Portsmouth, Rhoose, Sheffield, Skegness, Solihull, Southampton, St Helens, Stanwell, Stevenage, Stoke-on-Trent, Sutton Coldfield, Sutton-in-Ashfield, Swindon, Tamworth, Waterlooville, Watton, Westhill, Woolston, Worcester, Wrexham)
- Caused by: Anti-immigration sentiment
- Methods: Protest; violent disorder
- Result: Ongoing

Parties
Anti-migrant protesters/groups: Local residents; Local anti-illegal immigration and anti-migrant hotel groups; Advance UK; Britain First; British Unity; Homeland Party; Patriotic Alternative; Reform UK; UKIP; Turning Point UK; Raise The Colours; Ulster loyalists; Patriot Platform	Government of the United Kingdom; Various police forces (Note: Avon and Somerset Police, British Transport Police, Cheshire Constabulary, Devon and Cornwall Police, Dorset Police, Durham Constabulary, Dyfed-Powys Police, Essex Police, Gloucestershire Constabulary, Greater Manchester Police, Hampshire and Isle of Wight Constabulary, Kent Police, Lancashire Constabulary, Leicestershire Police, Merseyside Police, Metropolitan Police, Norfolk Constabulary, North Wales Police, Northamptonshire Police, Northumbria Police, Nottinghamshire Police, Police Scotland, South Wales Police, Staffordshire Police, Suffolk Constabulary, Surrey Police, Sussex Police, Warwickshire Police, West Midlands Police, West Mercia Police, West Yorkshire Police and Wiltshire Police); Principal Councils	Opposition/pro-immigration protesters: Local residents; Local anti-racist and anti-fascist groups; Stand Up To Racism; Hope Not Hate; Trade unions; Muslim Defence League

Casualties
- Injuries: 41 police officers (Note: London: 29 Epping: 11 Bristol: 1); At least 1 protester (Note: Edinburgh: 1)
- Arrested: 185 (Note: London: 55 Epping: 34 Bristol: 17 Liverpool: 11 Manchester: 8 Newcastle: 8 Sheffield: 7 Worcester: 6 Falkirk: 5 Hoylake: 4 Skegness: 4 Aberdeen: 3 Horley: 3 St Helens: 3 Portsmouth: 3 Belfast: 2 Bowthorpe: 2 Diss: 2 Blackpool: 1 Dundee: 1 Gloucester: 1 Leeds: 1 Nuneaton: 1 Peterborough: 1 Plymouth: 1 Southport: 1)
- Damage: Multiple police vehicles and buildings
- Map of disorder and protests Disorder Protests

Since February 2025, protests against immigration have taken place in parts of the United Kingdom, some of which have led to violent disorder. At least 41 police officers have been injured and over 180 people have been arrested. Some have been focused around hotels being used by the government of the United Kingdom to provide accommodation for asylum seekers, while others are against immigration more broadly. Many were organised or attended by far-right groups including Reform UK, Britain First, UKIP, Homeland Party, and Patriotic Alternative, who have also been accused of spreading misinformation online.

With some protests also occurring in the first half of the year, the volume of hotel protests began to increase in the aftermath of a series starting in Epping on 13 July, which repeatedly ended in disorder. Protests occurred across the country, with disorder in cities including Bristol, Glasgow, Liverpool, Manchester and Newcastle; the largest protest came on 13 September when up to 150,000 people took part in a London march organised by far-right activist Tommy Robinson, where 26 police officers were injured.

These protests are part of a series which have previously led to riots, most notably in 2024 when over 1,800 people were arrested and over 300 police officers injured. Earlier in the year, a series of riots took place in Northern Ireland which saw over 100 police officers being injured.

== Background ==
=== Use of hotels to house asylum seekers ===
The government of the United Kingdom is legally obliged to provide accommodation for asylum seekers who would otherwise be homeless until their applications have been considered. Prior to the COVID-19 pandemic, hotels were only for temporary "contingency" use, with the government instead paying private contractors to rent apartments or houses. During the lockdowns, the eviction of asylum seekers whose cases had been decided on was paused to prevent them from becoming homeless and they were moved into empty hotels in order to comply with social distancing measures; this decision was described as a "temporary measure" by the Conservative government under Boris Johnson.

However, what began as a temporary measure has become a long-term arrangement, with many of these facilities effectively ceasing to operate as commercial hotels. Hotels were often closed to other guests at short notice, with reports of weddings and other events being cancelled. The buildings are no longer open to paying guests and instead function as institutional accommodation centres, typically housing hundreds of asylum seekers on long-term contracts with the Home Office. At the height of hotel use under the Conservative government, in June 2023, 51,000 asylum seekers were housed in more than 400 hotels across the UK, costing the Home Office £8 million a day. Recent actions to add bedspaces include maximising capacity by requiring asylum seekers to share hotel rooms, with limited access to cooking facilities. Many asylum seekers remain in these facilities for months or years whilst their claims are processed, far exceeding the original "temporary" designation. In the year to June 2025, a record 111,084 people applied for asylum in the UK, with fewer than a third of applicants being housed in temporary hotel accommodation.

Living conditions in these facilities have been subject to extensive criticism from refugee advocacy groups and parliamentary committees, with reports describing substandard and overcrowded accommodation, malnutrition due to inadequate provisions, and rats all commonplace. Inspection reports have documented hotels with poor record keeping, inadequate security, and facilities lacking basic amenities such as cooking areas and outside space for children. Residents typically receive £49.18 per week to cover all living costs outside of accommodation, significantly below the standard Universal Credit allowance, and are prohibited from working whilst their claims are pending. The concentration of large numbers of asylum seekers in these former hotels has led to tensions in some local communities, with local residents rarely being informed of the use of a hotel in advance, creating what has been described as a "damaging sense of community powerlessness".

=== Earlier anti-immigration protests ===
In recent years, anti-immigration sentiment has grown in the United Kingdom. A report published by Runnymede Trust in 2025 proposed that this was encouraged by negative framing in the media and political discourse, with migrants consistently being portrayed in terms of crime and illegality during 2010 to 2014. The word 'illegal' was found to be one of the top five words associated with migrants in news reports and parliamentary debates in that time period, with the association becoming even stronger between 2019 to 2024. Experts and campaigners have suggested far-right groups have been using this to stoke tensions. This reached a peak most notably when in 2024 widespread riots led to over 1,800 arrests, with over 350 police officers being injured.

The spate of riots in 2024 followed a mass stabbing in which three children were killed and ten others injured. Soon after the attack, misinformation was spread online which incorrectly claimed that the attacker was an asylum seeker and a Muslim. These claims were spread by number of high-profile accounts on social media including Tommy Robinson, whilst a number of far-right activists called for nationwide protests. Along with pre-existing Islamophobic and racist attitudes, disorder spread across the country and led to attacks against Asian, Black and Muslim people as well as mosques, shops and community buildings such as libraries.

More recently, a series of riots in Northern Ireland in June 2025 led to over 50 arrests, with more than 100 police officers being injured. They were triggered by the alleged sexual assault of a girl in Ballymena by two teenagers who appeared in court with a Romanian interpreter; a month later, it was estimated that two-thirds of the Roma residents in the town had left.

Other more localised protests have occurred outside asylum hotels since 2021; however, they never spread nationwide. A few of these escalated into riots, including one in Knowsley on 10 February 2023 when a police van was set on fire and missiles were thrown at officers, leaving three of them injured.

=== Far-right mobilisation ===
The 2025 protests marked a significant escalation in far-right mobilisation around asylum accommodation, with established extremist groups seizing upon local concerns to advance broader anti-immigration agendas. While initial protests in locations such as Epping began with local residents, they were rapidly co-opted by organised far-right activists. The "Epping Says No" Facebook group, which organised demonstrations at the Bell Hotel, was administered by three members of the Homeland Party, a splinter group from the neo-Nazi organisation Patriotic Alternative.

Multiple far-right groups were documented as being present at the protests, including members of Britain First, the Homeland Party, Patriotic Alternative, and former UKIP activists. These groups were accused of spreading misinformation online to inflame tensions and recruit new supporters. The involvement of Reform UK provided a more mainstream political vehicle for anti-immigration sentiment, with the party's MPs such as Lee Anderson posting videos outside asylum hotels saying he was "absolutely furious" about their use for asylum seekers.

Some of the protests have been specifically organised by UKIP under their "Mass Deportations Tour", which has seen them march or rally in cities such as Glasgow, Nottingham, Liverpool, Newcastle, and London.

The protests have seen an increase in far-right efforts to use fears of violence against women to lend their views respectability. Multiple experts consulted by The Independent - including Andrea Simon, director of the End Violence Against Women Coalition; Lois Shearing, author of Pink Pilled; and a researcher for Hope not Hate - said that the far-right was are exploiting fears to make the far-right seem more "palatable", and that this is to appeal to a broader audience and gain more of a foothold in mainstream opinion. According to Simon, "these narratives are promoted by those who exploit genuine public concerns about sexual violence to intentionally fuel racism in our communities." Another development is the formation of organised women's groups attending the protests, such as The Pink Ladies and Women's Safety Initiative, who both reject the label far-right. The Hope not Hate researcher said of them; “with mobilisation comes recruitment”. On this Shearing said “a broader contingency of women” is being appealed to.

=== Role of misinformation ===
Social media platforms played a central role in coordinating and amplifying the 2025 asylum hotel protests. The protests were organised through Facebook groups with names following the pattern "X Community Says No to Y Local Hotel", alongside coordination via WhatsApp and Telegram. Telegram served as a key coordination hub for far-right networks, with the Institute for Strategic Dialogue documenting the platform's role as a "safe space for extremists to coordinate activity and instigate violence".

The role of Elon Musk and X in amplifying misinformation drew significant attention. Since Musk's takeover in 2022, X reinstated previously banned accounts including that of Tommy Robinson, who had been removed for hate speech violations. During the 2024 riots, Musk posted 46 times generating 808 million impressions, including a tweet claiming "civil war is inevitable" in the UK. Robinson's posts on X received over 580 million views in the two weeks following the Southport attack, an unprecedented reach for a previously banned figure.

A police inspectorate review published in May 2025 found that "misinformation and disinformation that had been posted online had been left up for too long and that helped fuel the disorder." The contemporaneous flag-raising campaign Operation Raise the Colours, coordinated by far-right activist Andrew Currien through social media platforms including Telegram and Facebook, was identified as connected to the broader network of anti-immigration activity.

== Timeline of demonstrations ==
=== Sporadic protests earlier in the year ===
On 1 February, supporters of Tommy Robinson organised a protest called "Uniting the Kingdom" outside of central London calling for his release. Many supporters were carrying signs such as "Stop the Boats" in reference of boats carrying illegal migrants crossing the English channel and hats saying "MEGA -- Make england great again".

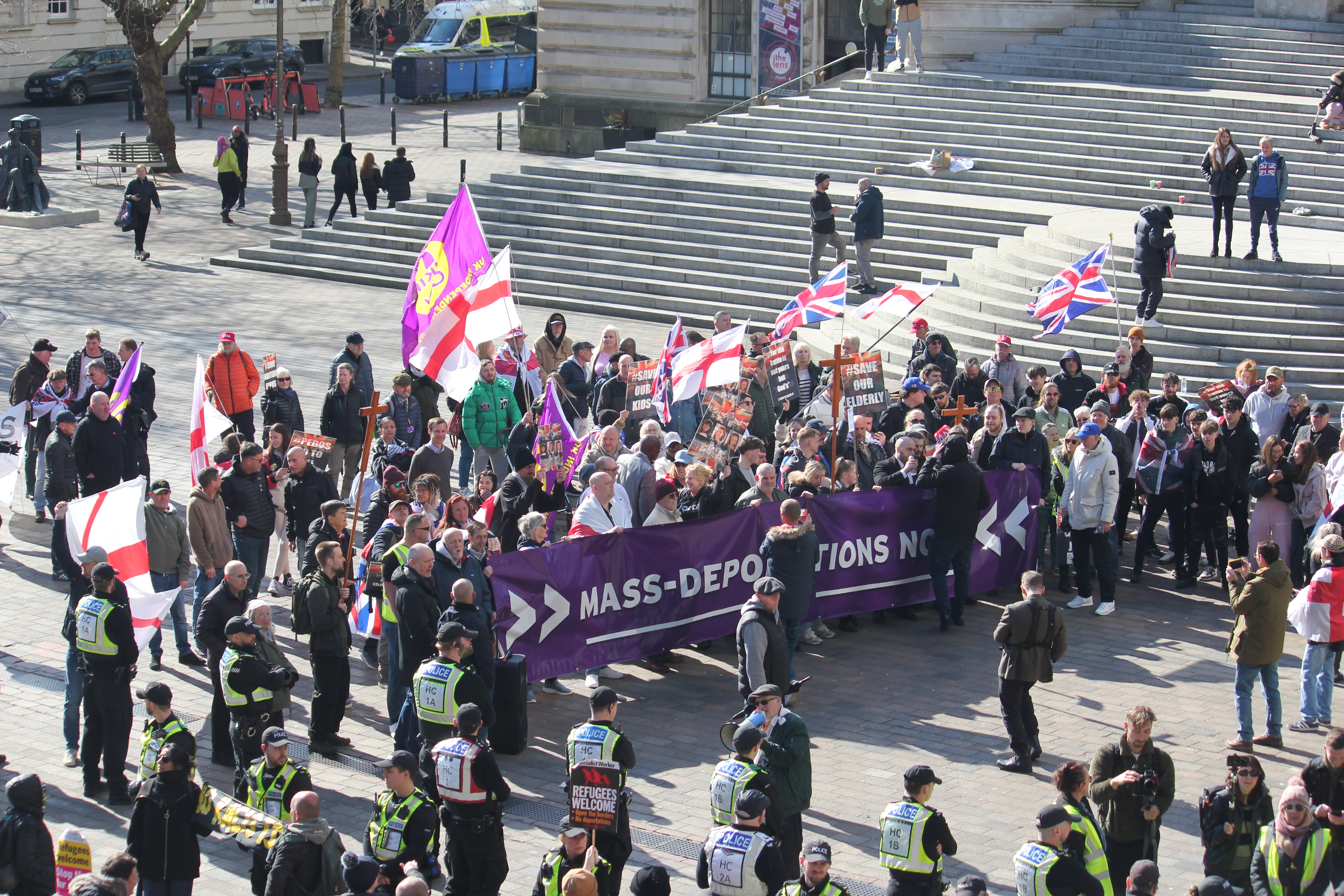
UKIP rally in Portsmouth on 15 March with a "Mass Deportations Now" banner.

On 15 March, a rally was held in Portsmouth by British nationalist political party UKIP calling for mass-deportations of migrants. Party leader Nick Tenconi was in attendance. A counter protest was led by Stand Up To Racism Portsmouth, at which the Leader of Portsmouth City Council, Steve Pitt, spoke.

On 13 April, a group called 'Fighting Justice Against Predators' held a protest about a hotel used to house asylum seekers in Paisley. They were opposed by a counter-protest from Stand Up To Racism. According to The Herald, the organisation focuses on immigration, has ties to the far-right Patriotic Alternative, and have a history of spreading unfounded allegations on Facebook. Police Scotland stated that criminality had not been established upon investigation of related reports.

On 27 April, a protest against illegal immigration organised by motorcycle group 'Kent Motor Heads' was held in Dover. The bikers gathered in the town centre, where they were joined by more people on foot. The protesters carried Union Jack flags and signs with the phrase "Stop the boats". The group passed through the town and into the Market Square, where they were met by a group of counter-protesters including Stand Up To Racism and members of Medway Trades Union Council. Paul Golding, leader of neo-fascist party Britain First, was in attendance. Kent Police said the event passed without any reported incidents of disorder or arrests.

On 17 May 2025 supporters of neo-fascist party Britain First, including leader Paul Golding, gathered from about midday in Birmingham city centre. They marched to Victoria Square where a stage and video screen had been set up, despite Birmingham City Council saying the protestors would not be welcome and would not be allowed on the square. City council leader, Cllr John Cotton said their access of the area would be investigated and called it "a serious breach of security". Police kept them apart from counter protesters. The Birmingham Mail reported Britain First's demands as "A ban on mosque construction", "The removal of 'non-indigenous' people – including those born here", and "The criminalisation of Islam in public life".

On the same day, 100 members of UKIP were in Bristol city centre calling for "mass-deportations". They were opposed by around 250 counter-protesters who carried Antifascism Action banners. The police gave a statement saying "Overall, both groups were calm and engaged with officers, however we did see a handful of clashes between the two sides." UKIP gathered initially by the Colston Statue plinth, whilst the counter-protesters gathered at Bristol Cenotaph. UKIP leader Nick Tenconi was present. The protests came to an end at around 3.30pm, with police transporting the remaining UKIP supporters away from the area in their riot vans as they were surrounded on both sides by counter-protesters.

=== Epping protests (July–September) ===
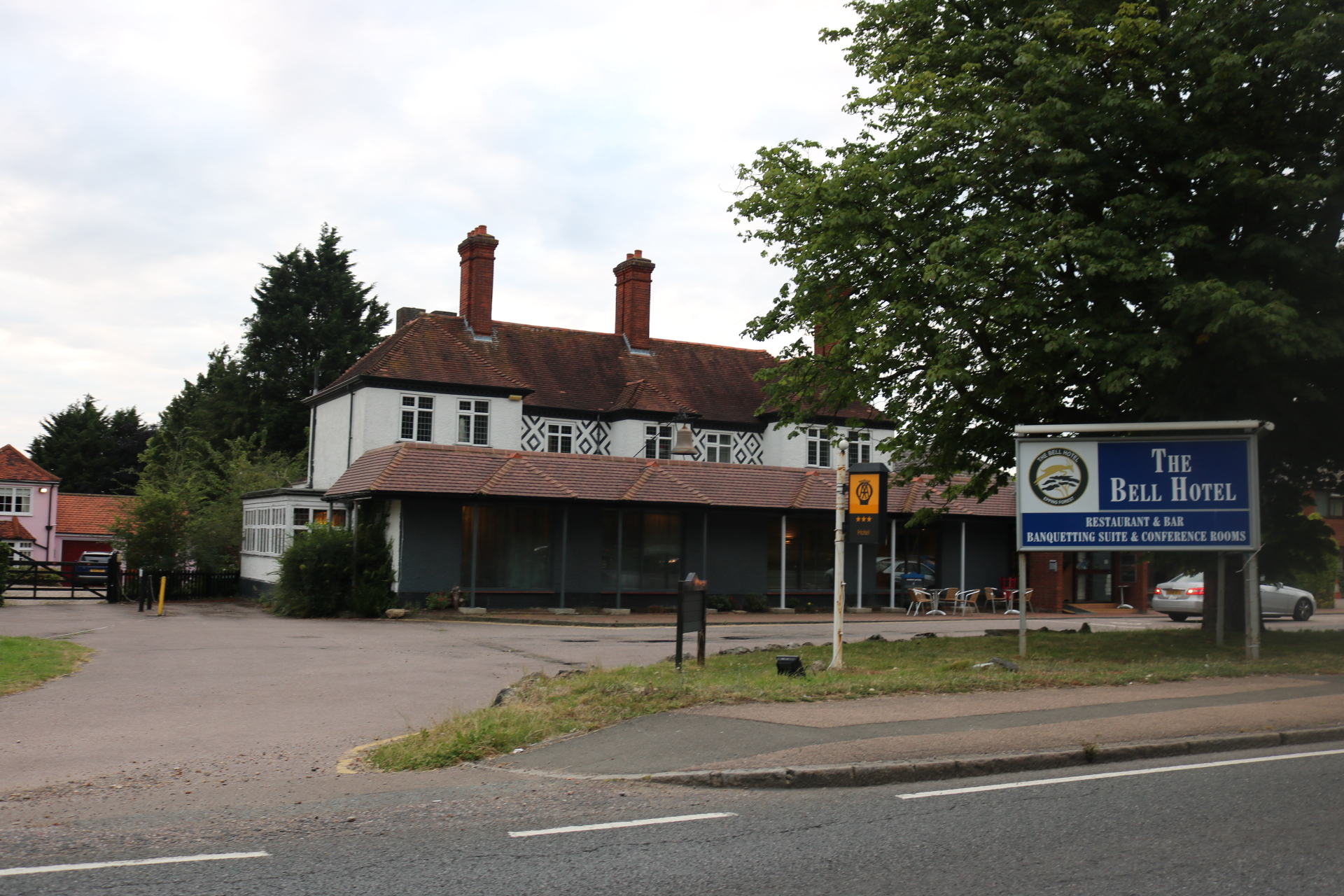
The Bell Hotel in 2019

On 7 and 8 July, a 41-year-old Ethiopian asylum seeker was accused of three sexual assaults in Epping, only eight days after arriving in the UK by boat on 29 June. He was arrested and remanded in custody after appearing at magistrates' court in Colchester on 10 July, where he denied three charges of sexual assault and charges of inciting a girl to engage in sexual activity and harassment without violence. He appeared in court again on 17 July for a case management hearing, where he was told he would face a two-day trial from 26 August. On 4 September 2025, he was found guilty of two counts of sexual assault, attempted sexual assault, attempt to cause/incite a girl 13 to 15 to engage in sexual activity, and harassment. The man, whose name is Hadush Kebatu, was sentenced to 12 months in prison on 23 September; as such, a deportation order must be made under the UK Borders Act 2007. Kebatu was erroneously released on 24 October instead of being sent to an immigration detention centre as part of the deportation process. Knowing he was supposed to be deported, he returned to the prison reception "four or five times", waiting outside the prison for roughly "an hour and a half" before leaving. He was re-arrested two days later and deported to Ethiopia the following week.

The first protest about asylum seekers took place outside the Bell Hotel in Epping on 13 July; the hotel was being used to house asylum seekers by the Home Office, who had faced calls from Neil Hudson, MP for Epping Forest, Alex Burghart, MP for Brentwood and Ongar and Christopher Whitbread, leader of Epping Forest District Council, to close the hotel. During the protest, two security personnel at the hotel were left with serious injuries after being attacked by a group of men.

A second protest took place against the hotel for asylum seekers took place in Epping on 17 July, attracting hundreds of demonstrators who were mostly local residents, although they were joined by some far-right activists, some of whom donned Britain First T-shirts. A separate counter-protest which included demonstrators from Stand Up To Racism (SUTR) took place outside Epping tube station; however, they later converged with the initial protest at the hotel which had been peaceful until that point. Disorder then ensued as clashes occurred with the counter-protesters, with riot police surrounding the small group of them as bottles, eggs and flour were thrown at them; the town's High Street was blocked off for many hours as police were directly attacked, with many of their vehicles being vandalised. The hotel itself was also damaged and the assistant chief constable of Essex Police said eight officers had suffered minor injuries, whilst two people had been arrested following the protest. A third person was arrested in connection to the disorder on 19 July and was charged with violent disorder and criminal damage. Nigel Farage called for the chief constable to resign after the police force was accused of "bussing" counter-protesters to the hotel; a police spokesman said the claims were "categorically wrong" but said officers had provided a foot cordon around protesters on their way to the protest.

The next anti-immigration protest took place at the same location on 20 July and was attended by over 1,000 people. Disorder also took place during this protest, with six people being arrested after what was described by the chief superintendent of Essex Police as "mindless thuggery" . Bottles and smoke flares were thrown at police vehicles and officers from Norfolk and Suffolk were drafted in; one officer from the former was hospitalised after being struck in the face by a bottle. Essex Police later said the cost of policing the protests on 17 and 20 July had exceeded £100,000.

On 24 July, a fourth protest took place at the Bell Hotel in Epping, with another taking place simultaneously at Epping Civic Offices, where a meeting regarding the hotel was taking place. Unlike the two previous protests, there was no disorder and only one person was arrested for refusing to remove a face covering, which police said was the 17th arrest in total. The council meeting concluded with a unanimous vote to urge the government to close the hotel.

On 27 July, another asylum hotel protest took place with a large number of counter-protesters attending. There were between 300 and 400 anti-migrant protesters, however they were outnumbered by an estimated 2,000 counter-protesters who made their way from the train station to the hotel. Essex Police described the protest as peaceful but added that three people were arrested; officers from the Cheshire, Durham, Dyfed-Powys, Hampshire, Kent, Leicestershire, Metropolitan, Northamptonshire, Surrey, Sussex and West Midlands forces were at the scene, with the British Transport Police also assisting. In Altrincham, protesters and counter-protesters faced off on either side of the A56 road outside a hotel with a small line of police between them.

On 31 July, another protest took place outside the Bell Hotel and passed peacefully with a march facilitated by police. Essex Police said that a total of 23 people had been arrested in connection with the earlier protests, 14 of whom had been charged.

On 3 August, a further protest passed peacefully, with police arresting and charging two more people in connection to the disorder on 17 July, bringing the total to 25 arrested and 16 charged. On 8 August, police arrested two people at another protest, one of whom was arrested after an officer was struck by an object; despite this, police said the protest passed peacefully. These arrests brought the total in Epping to 27. On 10 August, another protest attracted over 150 protesters.

On 17 August shadow Justice Secretary Robert Jenrick posted photos on X of himself attending that day's protest outside the hotel. Far-right activist Eddy Butler, who was a key strategist in the rise of the British National Party, can be seen wearing sunglasses in the background of one of the photos, which he then shared to his own social media. The Guardian referred to this posting as being "seized on by far-right figures eager to exploit the protest".

On 29 August, following the overturning of a temporary injunction which would have blocked asylum seekers being housed there, disorder broke out at the Bell Hotel after several weeks of peaceful protests. Two police officers were injured and three men were arrested: one for assaulting a police officer, one for drink-driving, and the other for violent disorder.

On 31 August, around 200 demonstrators gathered outside the council offices in Epping, where three people were arrested after protesters clashed with police.

On 5 September, further disorder broke out at a protest as flares were lit and one person was arrested, bringing the total number of arrests in the town to 32. Police later said the antisocial behaviour was not carried out by legitimate protesters and added that a resident of the hotel had been assaulted.

On 21 September, police put in place a dispersal order during a protest. This was intended to prevent the public from being harassed, alarmed or distressed, as well as to prevent disorder or crime in the area, while still allowing peaceful protest.

On 23 September, two further men were arrested at a protest outside the hotel. A 48-year-old was arrested on suspicion of breaching his bail conditions, and a 17-year-old was arrested on suspicion of failing to abide by the restrictions placed upon the protest.

=== Protests elsewhere (July–November) ===
==== July ====
On 5 July, an anti-migrant protest held on South Parade in Southsea, Portsmouth was met by counter-protesters. Videos showed the groups fighting and facing off with each other. The police issued a dispersal order, with three arrests made and one officer was assaulted.

On 19 July, a right-wing protest took place in Dover, with participants chanting "stop the boats" as they made their way to the seafront. Some Reform UK councillors were in attendance. A small number of people supporting the far-right group Patriotic Alternative were also at the protest. One man, who self-identified to KentOnline as far-right, had a flag bearing the group's logo, and wore a hat with the word "Remigration" on. An anti-immigration protest took place in Hull alongside a small counter-protest; three number-shaped balloons were released representing the ages of the three girls killed in the Southport stabbing.

On 21 July, protesters gathered outside a hotel housing asylum-seeking families in Diss, Norfolk, which the Home Office planned to change to house males. Initially, there were 60 protesters and 30 counter-protesters on opposing sides of a road, however after a confrontation the counter-protesters moved elsewhere. The number of protesters grew to around 150 and two people were arrested in connection to the protest later in the week.

On 22 July, a protest took place outside a four-star hotel in Canary Wharf, which Tower Hamlets Council said was going to be used as temporary accommodation for asylum seekers. Apsana Begum, MP for Poplar and Limehouse, said "refugees are welcome here", whilst Lee Anderson, the Chief Whip of Reform UK, expressed his disapproval online and said he was "absolutely furious" in a video taken outside the hotel. A second protest took place the following day, where anti-migrant protesters and counter-protesters shouted at each other from across the street as police guarded the hotel.

On 25 July, one person was arrested and charged in Leeds for obstructing a police officer during a peaceful protest at a hotel in Seacroft. An estimated 300 anti-immigration protesters gathered in Sutton-in-Ashfield following the arrest of a man for the rape of a woman. Lee Anderson, whose constituency, Ashfield, was where the rape took place, claimed online that the suspect was an asylum seeker. The protesters gathered in the town centre, with a much smaller number of counter-protesters gathering at a nearby church. Protests also took place in Bournemouth and Southampton, with one in Portsmouth seeing anti-migrant protesters face off with counter-protesters outside a hotel.

On 26 July, around 400 anti-immigration protesters gathered outside a hotel housing asylum seekers in Bowthorpe, with around 150 counter-protesters also in attendance. Around 60 police officers were also at the scene, however the protest passed without incident and the force said no arrests were made. A "mass deportation" protest in Glasgow led by Nick Tenconi, the leader of UKIP, saw around 150 supporters march through the city as hundreds of anti-racists staged a counter-demonstration organised by SUTR.

On 29 July, a peaceful protest took place in Hoylake after it was reported that the home officed planned to change the residents of a hotel from asylum-seeking families to single males. Wirral Council said they "strongly opposed" the plans and residents described their frustration over the lack of communication with the local community.

On 30 July, over 1,000 anti-immigration protesters gathered in Waterlooville in opposition to plans to house asylum seekers in flats above shops. The protesters were supported by Suella Braverman, MP for Fareham and Waterlooville and former Home Secretary, who said the plans were "utterly inappropriate" and that she was "very proud" of protesters. The plans were dropped on 8 August following the protest and a petition by Braverman which received over 10,000 signatures.

A man was arrested during a third day of protests in Hoylake for supporting a proscribed terrorist organisation, although police said the offence took place outside the area. A protest also took place at a hotel in Stanwell after the Home Office revealed plans to exclusively house male asylum seekers there rather than the families which were currently being housed there. Over 100 protesters were in attendance and there were reports of anti-social behaviour and criminal damage; the following day it was announced that the plans had been paused.

==== August ====
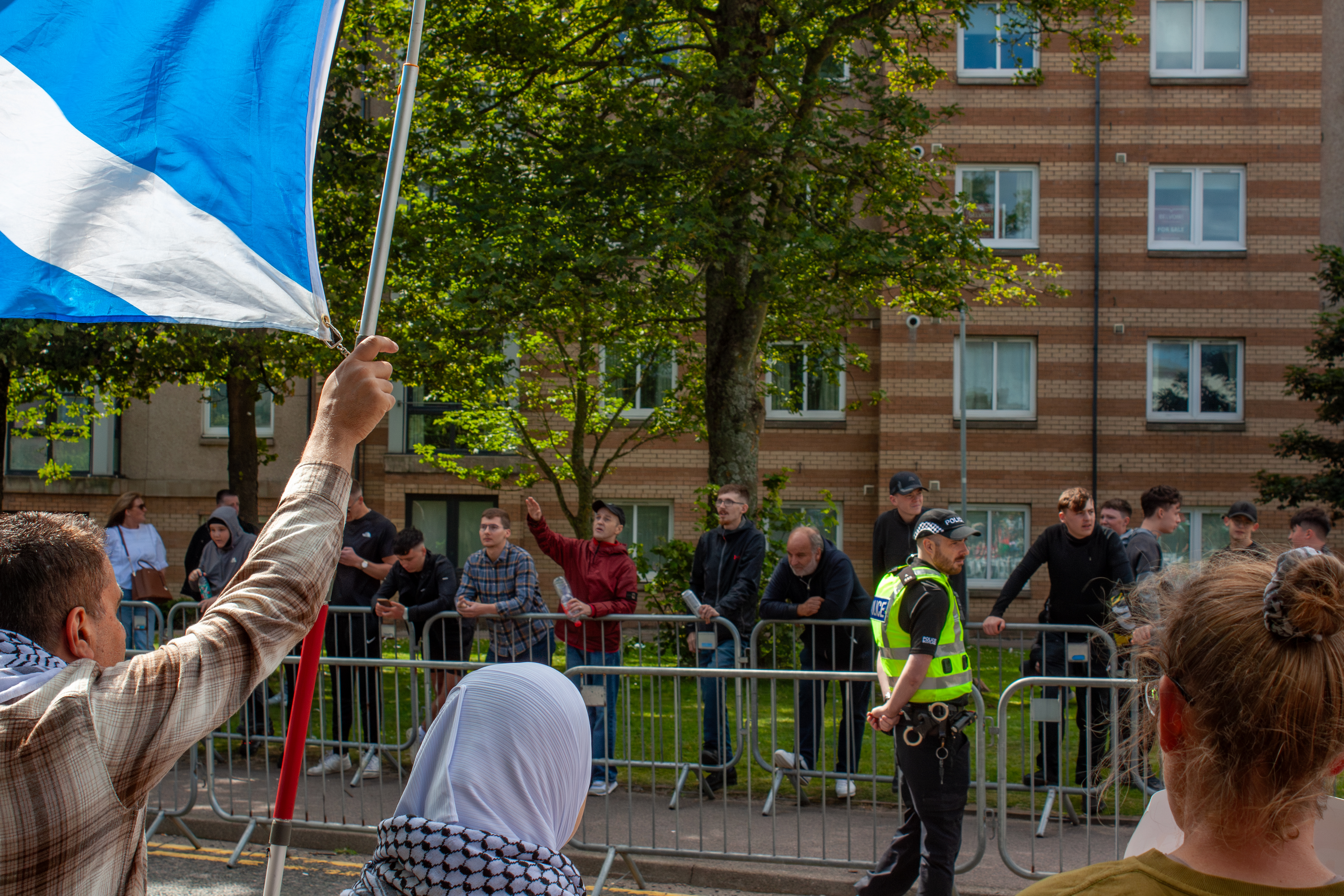
Protest in the city of Aberdeen in Scotland on 9 August

On 1 August, a 64-year-old counter-protester was hospitalised after being hit by a placard during a protest at The Meadows in Edinburgh. A protest took place at a hotel housing asylum seekers in Portsmouth following an alleged incident with one of its residents; it was attended by both anti-migrant and anti-racism demonstrators. Further protests also took place in Bournemouth and Southampton.

On 2 August, a total of 15 people were arrested in London, Manchester and Newcastle upon Tyne following clashes amid protests at hotels housing asylum seekers. In London, protesters gathered at the Thistle City Barbican Hotel in Islington, with counter-protesters from SUTR also in attendance; police said nine people were arrested. In Newcastle, protesters and counter-protesters gathered at a hotel, with Northumbria Police saying four people were arrested there. In Manchester, around 1,500 people took place in a march organised by Britain First, with around 250 counter-protesters from SUTR; two people were arrested at the start of the march, which tracked from Manchester Piccadilly station to Manchester Central Library. A demonstration outside accommodation for asylum seekers in Aberdeen led to two men being arrested and charged under the Hate Crime Act, one of whom was also charged for an assault. A further five men in attendance were later also charged under the Hate Crime Act. A group of anti-migrant protesters gathered outside a hotel in Cannock, with counter-protesters also in attendance. Around 200 people gathered for a protest in Newtownabbey.

On 3 August another protest took place at the Britannia International Hotel in Canary Wharf and flares were set off, with protesters being accused of trying to break into the hotel as they attempted to breach the fencing; one man was arrested on suspicion of assaulting an emergency worker. Merseyside Police said they had arrested a further three people for public order offences following protests in Hoylake earlier that week.

On 4 August, around 250 people gathered at the Civic Centre in Mansfield before marching to the police station following claims that asylum seekers were being housed there, with organisers accusing local police of failing to protect the public. A small group of around 20 protesters blocked the entrance to a hotel in Watton, Norfolk after its renovation sparked rumours that it was to be repurposed by the Home Office to house asylum seekers.

On 7 August, protestors gathered outside the offices of Spelthorne Borough Council as they discussed the Home Office's plans for the hotel in Stanwell; the discussion resulted in the council urging the government to reconsider its plans.

On 8 August, a SUTR protest under the banner "Defend Refugees, Stop the Far Right" took place at the hotel in Canary Wharf, with an anti-migrant counter-protest also in attendance; both sides had around 100 demonstrators and two people were arrested: one from each side. Another protest in Altrincham attracted hundreds of opposing protesters, who were separated by the A56 road, the central reservation of which was lined with police; at least two assaults were reported to police during the protest.

A protest took place in Crick, Northamptonshire after a resident of a local asylum hotel was charged with sexual assault. Another protest in Bowthorpe attracted around 300 protesters, with 80 counter-protesters also attending. Another protest took place in Hoylake, with around 100 protesters and 50 counter-protesters taking part. A small protest outside the Highfield House Hotel in Portswood, a suburb of Southampton, attracted around 25 protesters and 100 counter-protesters. Nick Tenconi, the leader of UKIP, was accused of making a Nazi salute after he was recorded raising his arm at a protest in Portsmouth. Around 100 protesters gathered outside a hotel in Chichester, which had been used to house migrants for around two years. Groups of anti-migrant and anti-racist protesters gathered at a hotel near Cardiff Airport in Rhoose which was housing Afghan families.

On 9 August, another protest took place near a hotel housing asylum seekers in Newcastle, where one person was arrested for a public order offence. A protest taking place outside the Grand Metropole Hotel in Blackpool coincided with the Rebellion Festival, some of the attendees of which clashed with the protesters, with one person being arrested for being drunk and disorderly. Protesters marched through Heywood and gathered outside the office of Elsie Blundell, MP for Heywood and Middleton North. Two groups of protesters faced off at a hotel in Liverpool, with some counter-protesters shouting "nazi" at people on the anti-migrant side. A protest organised by Patriotic Alternative in Newark-on-Trent saw anti-migrant and anti-racist protesters clash outside the offices of Newark and Sherwood District Council.

A protest took place in Nuneaton after George Finch, the leader of Warwickshire County Council, claimed that two men charged with the rape of a 12-year-old girl were asylum seekers. During the protest, which was organised by the Homeland Party, one person was arrested for threatening to cause criminal damage. Hundreds of people gathered outside Nuneaton Town Hall, with a smaller group of counter-protesters being outnumbered and led away by police after a few hours. Protesters gathered outside the Ramada hotel in Solihull and marched from the police station to the town centre, with the Touchwood shopping centre closing following police advice. Around 100 anti-immigration protesters and 300-400 counter-protesters gathered in outside a hotel housing asylum seekers in Bristol. A protest in Bournemouth attracted 200 anti-immigration protesters and 100 counter-protesters, with Dorset Police receiving support from Surrey, Sussex and Wiltshire as they separated the opposing groups. A protest took place outside a hotel near Exeter Airport which was housing asylum seekers, with counter-protesters also in attendance. In Belfast, anti-immigration protesters gathered near the City Hall with a counter-demonstration also taking place; two people were arrested: one man on suspicion disorderly behaviour and a woman for wearing a T-shirt in support of proscribed terrorist organisation Palestine Action.

On 10 August, a protest took place outside a hotel in Copthorne near Gatwick Airport.

On 13 August, Suella Braverman attended another protest in Waterlooville after plans to house asylum seekers there were ditched, becoming the "first sitting MP to address an illegal migrant protest at a rally".

On 15 August, a protest took place at an asylum hotel in Sutton Coldfield which was once used for the TV series Crossroads.

On 16 August, hundreds of anti-immigration protesters gathered at the Cladhan Hotel in Falkirk and faced off with anti-racism protesters; Police Scotland said two people was arrested, one for indecent exposure and the other for obstructing police. A third protest took place in Cannock, with around 140 protesters and 40 counter-protesters facing off. At a protest outside the County Hall in Maidstone, five councillors were pictured alongside a protester draped in the flag of British Movement, a neo-Nazi organisation.

On 17 August a protest in Ashington attracted hundreds. Organisers said it was called over their concerns about illegal immigrants housed in the area and that alleged reports of men taking photos of children were "ignored". MP for Blyth and Ashington Ian Lavery spoke out in disagreement, saying "Criminality is not confined to any race or religion. The vast majority of people arriving in this country want safety for their families, to abide by our laws and to be given the opportunity to contribute." A protest against using hotels to house asylum seekers attracted around 200 demonstrators in Dudley, with a small group of counter-protesters also in attendance. Another protest in Bowthorpe was attended by hundreds of people who marched through the town and blocked a road. A protest led by a group calling itself 'The Pink Ladies' occurred outside the Britannia International hotel in Canary Wharf. They were accompanied by a group of masked men. Six arrests were made. In Southampton, anti-racism protesters confronted demonstrators outside a hotel used for asylum seekers, though both groups were kept on opposite sides of the road by police.

On 20 August, around 150 people gathered outside a hotel in Worcester, with West Mercia Police saying two officers had been assaulted but were not hurt. Three people were arrested: two on suspicion of assaulting police officers and one for breaching the peace. Two days later, police arrested three more people in connection to the protest: all were arrested on suspicion of public order offences, with one also accused of assaulting an emergency worker and another for racially aggravated harassment.

On 21 August, another protest took place at a hotel in Bowthorpe, where two men connected to the hotel were arrested on suspicion of public order offences.

The weekend preceding the August Bank Holiday, which is on 25 August, saw another wave of protests across the country starting on 22 August. Protests were advertised for at least 26 hotels housing migrants, with SUTR organising 15 counter-protests; combined with other concurrent events including the Notting Hill Carnival and a number of Premier League matches, a number of police forces were under increased pressure.

On 22 August, protesters gathered outside the Portsmouth Civic Offices and faced off with counter-protesters. Another protest took place in Chichester, with 100 protesters and 30 counter-protesters in attendance. A protest and counter-protest took place outside a hotel in Orpington, whilst around 250 anti-immigration demonstrators gathered at a hotel in Cheshunt and blocked the A10 road as they set off flares. Smaller protests took place at hotels which had already seen demonstrations in Altrincham, Rhoose and Seacroft.

On 23 August, around 200 people protested outside a hotel in Westhill, with a significant but smaller number of people attending a counter-protest. Around 150 people gathered outside the Radisson Blu hotel in Perth, with around 250 people attending a counter-protest across the street. Anti-asylum protesters and counter-protesters clashed at another protest in Newcastle, with police having to keep the groups separated. In Chadderton, around 150 anti-immigration protesters faced off with 20 counter-protesters. A protest organised by UKIP in Liverpool city centre saw more than 400 demonstrators attend, with counter-protests from SUTR and Merseyside Anti-Fascist Network totalling a few hundred people also taking place; 11 people were arrested for offences including affray, assault and drunk and disorderly. A large group of people gathered for a peaceful protest outside a hotel in Woolston. Around 300 people attended a protest in Mold opposing plans to house asylum seekers in the town, with around 40 counter-protesters also attending.

A small protest took place outside a hotel in Long Eaton, with a counter-protest also in attendance following reports of some people being abusive towards migrants. A fourth protest took place in Cannock, with many counter-protesters also in attendance as a banner reading "Welcome Home Lucy Connolly" was unveiled by demonstrators. In Tamworth, around 150 people protested outside a hotel which had been the target of violent disorder in 2024. A protest at a hotel in Oxford saw around 40 demonstrators clash with around 70 counter-protesters. In Bristol, around 50 anti-immigration protesters and 250 counter-protesters gathered at Castle Park, with mounted police having to form a barrier between the two groups as one woman was arrested on suspicion of assaulting an emergency worker. Around 200 anti-immigration protesters gathered outside a hotel in Horley and clashed with 30 counter-protesters, with lines of police having to separate them as three people were arrested.

On 24 August, a protest took place outside a hotel in Stevenage. Another protest in Solihull saw dozens of demonstrators circle a hotel housing asylum seekers.

On 25 August, two men were arrested following a "mainly peaceful" protest outside an OYO hotel in St Helens.

On 29 August, a small protest took place outside a hotel in Ashford.

On 30 August, around 500 anti-asylum protesters from two separate groups gathered in West Drayton and marched to a Crowne Plaza hotel whilst smaller groups went to nearby Holiday Inn and Novotel hotels. A group of masked men attempted to break into the Crowne Plaza hotel and five people were arrested, with two police officers sustaining minor injuries. In Aberdeen, another protest was attended by around 120 people and 50 counter-protesters. Another protest in Falkirk saw hundreds of protesters gather at the office of Euan Stainbank, MP for Falkirk, before marching to the Cladhan Hotel housing asylum seekers where they faced off with counter-protesters; three people were arrested. Another protest in Chadderton was attended by around 100 protesters and 50 counter-protesters. Around 120 people gathered at the train station in Skegness and marched to a hotel housing asylum seekers, where the crowd grew to over 150; four people were arrested, including a 12-year-old boy.

Two groups numbering around 100 people in total gathered at a hotel in Stoke-on-Trent, where they were separated by police as they faced off. Around 100 people on both sides faced off at another protest outside a hotel in Long Eaton. Around 100 anti- and 50 pro-immigration protesters gathered at a hotel in Deanshanger which was being used to house asylum seekers. Around 120 people on both sides gathered outside a hotel in the Barnwood suburb of Gloucester for an anti-immigration and counter-protest. A protest outside a hotel in Swindon was attended by around 200 people at its height. Another protest in Portsmouth saw around 150 anti- and 100 pro-immigration protesters march through the city.

On 31 August, four people were arrested during a protest in Canary Wharf where a police officer was punched in the face. In the Fallowfield area of Manchester, around 60 anti-immigration protesters were outnumbered by around 250 counter-protesters, with police having to keep the opposing groups apart. Another protest and counter-protest outside a hotel in St Helens passed peacefully. Police in Wrexham issued a dispersal order after a protest.

==== September ====
On 1 September, a road in Newtownabbey was closed after a roundabout was blocked by an anti-immigration protest. In Plymouth, protesters and counter-protesters gathered outside the headquarters of Plymouth City Council in opposition of the removal of flags around the city.

On 5 September, one man was arrested on suspicion of public order offences at a protest outside a hotel in Peterborough.

On 6 September, another protest took place in Mold with a counter-protest also occurring. Another protest took place in Long Eaton for the third consecutive weekend, with police separating the opposing groups. Hundreds of people gathered in Faversham in opposition and support of asylum seekers. Around 75 anti-immigration protesters were outnumbered by around 300 SUTR protests in Edinburgh, with a later protest for Scottish independence numbering over 2,500 people. One person was arrested during a protest and counter-protest at Marischal College in Aberdeen.

On 7 September, another protest at a hotel in Fallowfield saw six arrests as protesters and counter-protesters gathered outside a hotel. One person was arrested at another protest in St Helens, whilst three were arrested in Bristol as protesters and counter-protesters clashed. Around 150 protesters and 70 anti-racism protesters gathered at another demonstration in Plymouth. Hundreds of people attended a further protest and counter-protest at the Cladhan Hotel in Falkirk. Both sides were separated by police officers and metal barriers. Police Scotland confirmed that four arrests were made. Police said they were investigating an arson attack on a hotel in Southampton after a flare was pushed through a window, starting a small fire; the hotel was the subject of earlier protests.

On 13 September a "stop the boats" protest took place in Newtown, Powys, where around 400 anti-immigration protesters held a minute of silence for Charlie Kirk and 200 counter-protesters heard from Steve Witherden, MP for Montgomeryshire and Glyndŵr, and Liz Saville Roberts, MP for Dwyfor Meirionnydd. Hundreds of protesters and counter-protesters faced off in Dundee, with eggs being thrown as police separated the groups.

Also, on 13 September, a demonstration took place in Ashington where protestors marched to the Ashington War Memorial where participants expressed concerns about local and national issues, including illegal immigration and the preservation of British heritage. Local MP Ian Lavery criticised the gathering, describing it as a "desecration" of the memorial after participants displayed a Patriotic Alternative banner. Organisers of the protest argued that they were "unaware of what Patriotic Alternative stood for and that someone just showed up with the banner". They apologised.

Another protest took place at the Cladhan Hotel in Falkirk, where a counter-demonstration was also present. A fifth protest followed in the evening of 17 September.

A protest named 'Glasgow Rises Unity Rally' was held on Buchanan Street in the city on 20 September. The protest was organised by convicted domestic abuser and right-wing podcaster John Watt. Patriotic Alternative were in attendance with a banner. There was a counter-protest made up of Glasgow SUTR, other anti-racist groups, and trades unions. Scottish newspaper The National reported that the "Unity Rally" was drowned out by the counter-protesters.

In Canterbury a protest met at the Westgate, before marching through the city towards Connors House, a former care home in Craddock Road now used by Kent County Council to house unaccompanied asylum seeking children. A counter-protest was also held, including the local branches of SUTR and the Revolutionary Communist Party. Local Labour councillor Alan Baldock was with the counter-protest. Kent Police said one person was assaulted and enquiries are ongoing.

A group calling itself 'Bournemouth Patriots' marched along Meyrick Road to Lansdowne. An equally sized counter-protest occurred. In Plymouth another protest was held as well as an anti-fascist counter-protest. A man was arrested and a woman detained by local police. In Oxford, a protest and counter-protest were both present outside the Holiday Inn Express Kassam. In Basingstoke, a protest took place outside the Crowne Plaza hotel, Black Dam.

On 21 September, a seventh protest and counter-protest were held outside the Cladhan Hotel in Falkirk. Police investigated reports a man was racially abused by a member of the anti-immigration protest. A protest marched from The Norkie pub to the Brook Hotel, in Bowthorpe, Norwich, and were met by counter-protesters.

A 64-year-old man was arrested on suspicion of arson with intent to endanger life after a fire occurred at the Thistle City Barbican hotel in Islington on 24 September. The hotel was being used for housing asylum seekers and had previously been protested. There were no injuries and staff put out the flames before police arrived at the scene.

On 27 September, UKIP and hundreds of supporters marched from Quayside to the city centre in Newcastle upon Tyne. A counter-protest organised by Stand Up To Racism also occurred, in which thousands of people took part, while a heavy police presence kept the groups separate. Three arrests were made. North East mayor, Kim McGuinness was part of the counter-protest. In Wigan a protest was held under the banner of 'The Great British National Protest' and saw a counter-protest from SUTR and the Wigan Trade Union Council. Manchester Evening News gave a combined estimate of several hundred attendees. Another UKIP rally, consisting of a group of around nine people, was held on Margate seafront. A counter-protest organised by the Kent Anti-Racism Network saw a more significant turnout. In Folkestone, about 30 anti-immigration activists gathered outside Napier Barracks, one man was holding a flag with the logo of the neo-Nazi British Movement. They were opposed by 100 counter-protesters.

==== October ====
On 5 October around 100 demonstrators protesting against the government's use of hotels for asylum seekers marched between Bristol Cenotaph and College Green in Bristol city centre. A group of between 300 and 400 counter-protesters had gathered nearby beforehand and intercepted the march, with some physical confrontations following. The police said that the protesters observed the legal requirement to stay in their designated area but the counter-protesters did not. Three people were arrested. In Gloucester around 75 protesters against the use of two hotels to house migrants in the city marched to the Gloucestershire County Council offices on Westgate Street. They were met by around 200 counter-protesters, kept separate by police officers with fencing. One arrest was made.

On 11 October an anti-immigration demonstration took place outside the Alloway Centre in Dundee for the fifth weekend in a row. A large group of anti-racism campaigners also gathered as a counter-protest. Some racist graffiti was painted on the wall of a bridge going over the Dighty Burn in the hours before the start of the protest before being quickly covered.

On 18 October over 100 anti-immigration protesters marched through Southampton before ending at Highfield House Hotel in Portswood. They were opposed by around 200 counter-protesters. In Rochester, Kent, just over a dozen UKIP supporters, including county councillor Amelia Randall, marched down the High Street in opposition to the government and illegal immigration. The march was organised by Roger Hogg, who has arranged other similar events elsewhere in the county. They were diverted from their planned route after their intended path was blocked by a much larger Medway Stand Up to Racism counter-protest at the Northgate junction. A large police presence generally kept the two groups separate. Among the counter-protesters were Medway councillors Vince Maple and Teresa Murray, and the MPs for Rochester and Strood and Gillingham and Rainham, Lauren Edwards and Naushabah Khan.

On 21 October, a rally planned by UKIP for 25 October in Whitechapel was banned from occurring within the London Borough of Tower Hamlets, an area with a large Muslim population, by the Metropolitan Police. The police said that this action was taken due to a "realistic prospect of serious disorder". UKIP's X account had asked attendees to "reclaim Whitechapel from the Islamists". UKIP accused the police of two-tier policing and of caving in to "sectarian violence" as they believed "far-left and Islamist protest groups" were planning disorder, and changed their plans to instead gather at the Brompton Oratory and march to Speakers' Corner. UKIP's march were also prohibited from protesting before 1pm or after 4.30pm. A counter-protest organised by Stand Up To Racism and other local groups remained planned for Whitechapel, and the police further banned SUTR from gathering in an area of central London, including near the UKIP protest. Four anti-racist counter-protester were arrested for breaching this. UKIP's march consisted of about 75 people carrying wooden crosses and England fans.

Also on 25 October, in Exeter, about 250 people took part in the 'British Unity Walk' through the city centre before ending at Bedford Square. There, the march was met by a counter-protest of about 600 people, organised by local community groups under the banner 'Exeter for Everyone'. 'British Unity' describe themselves as: "a movement dedicated to the preservation and advancement of the United Kingdom's values, culture, and heritage." In Canterbury a second anti-immigration demonstration outside Connors House in as many month was held. A counter-protest was also present, organised by groups including SUTR. Cllr Paul Prentice, who represents Barton ward, attended the counter.

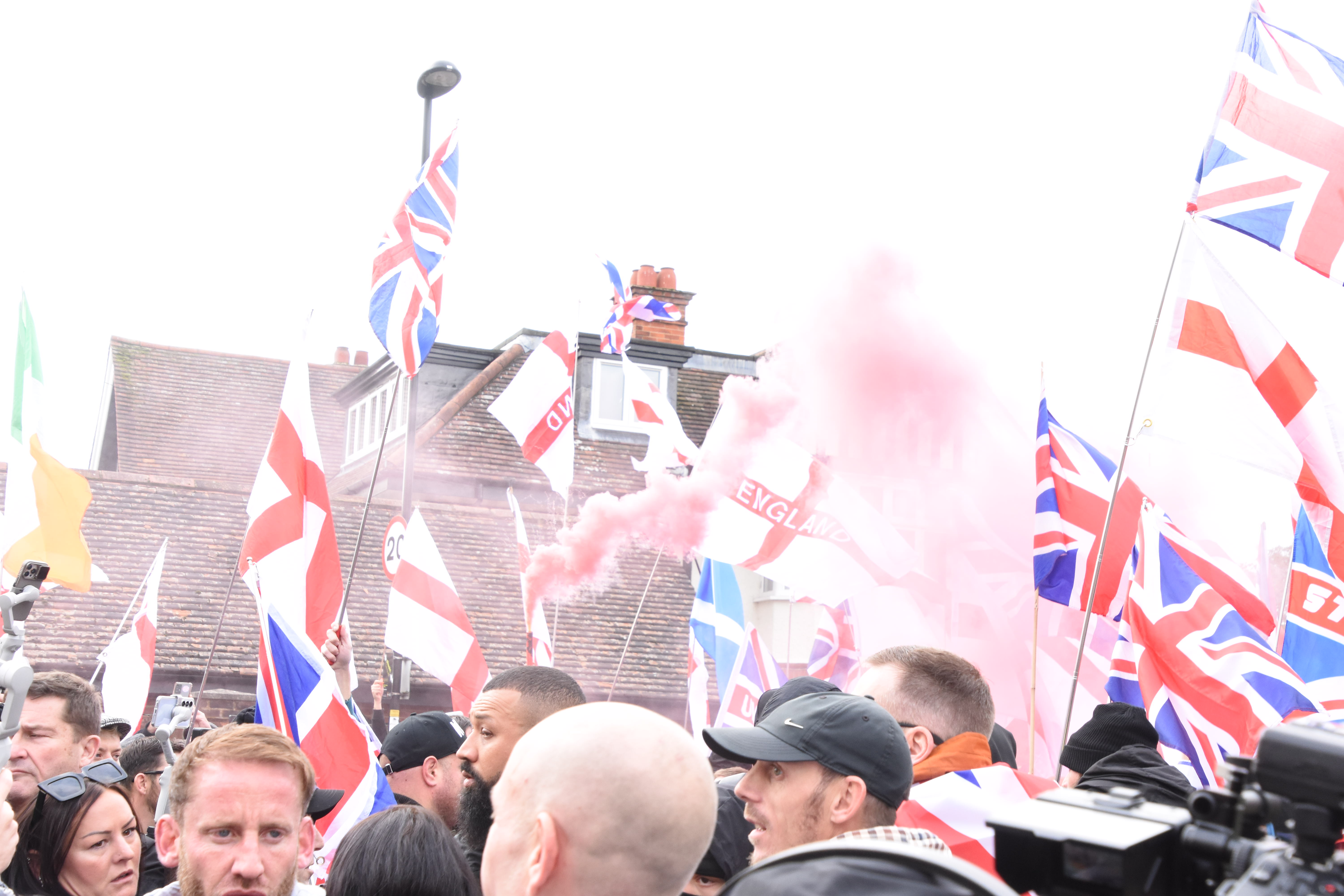
Flares set off at a protest in Southampton on 26 October.

On 26 October two marches took place in Southampton, with police blocking off part of Portswood Road to keep them apart. Several hundred anti-immigration protesters, led by Tommy Robinson and waving union and St George's flags, marched through the city. Police used powers under the Public Order Act to restrict their route to being from Highfield Lane to Hoglands Park in the city centre. An estimated 600 anti-racism counter-protesters assembled to oppose them. A second flashpoint at Thomas Lewis Way and Lodge Road saw police holding back the anti-immigration protesters, with Thomas Lewis Way also being closed for a time while protesters passed. One arrest was made on suspicion of throwing a bottle. In Dundee another anti-immigration protest occurred at Alloway Place, again met with counter-protesters. One arrest made.

In Southport, an estimated 100 to 200 took part in a protest dubbed the 'Southport Freedom March' took place, beginning at Marine Drive. A scuffle broke out between counter-protestors and the police, as the march made its way past counter demonstrators positioned outside Southport Funland. The protesters had lots of union flags, with one flag bearing the slogan Unite the Kingdom and another sign showed support for the fascist political party Britain First. Counter-protesters chanted "Nazi scum, off our streets". Both groups were surrounded by the police outside the Scarisbrick Hotel. One arrest was made.

On 30 October anti-immigration protesters met at the clock tower in Herne Bay to "back British fisherman", "stop the boats" and "say no to digital ID". Their presence attracted a large group of counter-protesters, chanting "asylum is a human right" and "refugees are welcome here". A line of about 50 police officers separated the two groups.

==== November ====
On 8 November a UKIP anti-immigration march in Sheffield city centre was countered by a much larger group of anti-fascist organisations, with both groups kept apart by police. UKIP started in Tudor Square while the anti-fascists set off from Sheffield Cathedral. Seven arrests were made.

On 14 November around 50 anti-immigration protesters met outside Highfield House Hotel in Portswood, with Southampton SUTR holding a counter-protest of around 100 people.

On 15 November an anti-immigration demonstration of about 75 people, of which UKIP leader Nick Tenconi was a member, was held outside the Mercure hotel in Redcliffe, Bristol, by a group called 'Bristol Patriots'. This was met by a larger pro-immigration counter-protest of about 400 people, containing organisations such as the Bristol chapters of Palestine Solidarity Campaign and SUTR. Police separated the two sides, with clashes in the early afternoon between an anti-fascist counter-protester group and the police who were pushing the group back up Redcliffe Hill when trying to meet the anti-migrant protesters. Five people were arrested, and an officer received treatment at hospital after sustaining injuries.

On 21 November a further anti-immigration protest was held outside Highfield House Hotel in Southampton, where a man was arrested after displaying a homophobic sign. Police said the arrest was made "on suspicion of several offences, including possessing a Class B controlled drug, failing to give a name or address, and using threatening or abusive words or behaviour likely to cause harassment, alarm, or distress."

On 22 November an anti-immigration protest called 'British Unity Walk' of about 150 people marched in Exeter. About 800 people gathered for a march called 'Exeter is for Everyone' in response. The two groups took different routes to around the city centre, Police said the protests were peaceful overall and did not confirm if any arrests were made.

=== Unite the Kingdom rally (13 September) ===
On 13 September, between 110,000 and 150,000 people gathered in central London for a march organised by Tommy Robinson called the Unite the Kingdom rally; simultaneous counter-protests by Stand Up To Racism and local anti-fascist groups attracted around 5,000 demonstrators. Around 1,000 officers were deployed in the city, with a further 500 officers drafted from other forces, including Devon and Cornwall, Leicestershire and Nottinghamshire. Police said 24 people were arrested following "wholly unacceptable" violence which left 26 police officers injured (the Metropolitan Police later appealed for help in identifying a further 28 people suspected of public order offences and assaulting emergency workers at the protests). The two groups clashed on Whitehall and Trafalgar Square, where lines of police and horses separated them. Police reported that the crowd was too large to fit into Whitehall, leading to confrontations with officers after some protesters tried to access the area from other routes; many officers were assaulted and had objects such as bottles and flares thrown at them, with one bottle striking a horse. The event was livestreamed by Robinson on X and at its peak had 2.9 million viewers.

The recent assassination of Charlie Kirk was used to mobilise support for the protest after hundreds of people gathered for a vigil in the city the previous day. During the march, Robinson spoke to crowds and stated the court had decided undocumented migrants' rights superseded those of locals. Elon Musk spoke to the crowd through a video call, where he said a "dissolution of parliament" is needed and said that "massive uncontrolled migration" was contributing to the "destruction of Britain"; he continued to tell the crowd "violence is coming" and that "you either fight back or you die".

Ben Habib, leader of Advance UK (one of the event sponsors), led a speech. European far-right politicians, including French Reconquête leader Éric Zemmour, Danish People's Party leader Morten Messerschmidt, Alliance for the Union of Romanians leader George Simion, Polish Law and Justice MEP Dominik Tarczynski, Belgian Vlaams Belang MP Filip Dewinter and Alternative for Germany MEP Petr Bystron also spoke at the event. The New Zealander and Christian fundamentalist Brian Tamaki also spoke at the rally, calling for all public expressions of non-Christian faiths to be banned. Politicians including Diane Abbott and John McDonnell attended the anti-racism march and also made speeches. In response to the rally, described by The Guardian as "the largest nationalist protest in decades", the Prime Minister Keir Starmer made a statement to the newspaper:

People have a right to peaceful protest. It is core to our country's values ... But we will not stand for assaults on police officers doing their job or for people feeling intimidated on our streets because of their background or the colour of their skin ... Britain is a nation proudly built on tolerance, diversity and respect. Our flag represents our diverse country and we will never surrender it to those that use it as a symbol of violence, fear and division.

The statement was interpreted by The Guardian as a welcome change in tone on equality and anti-racism. That it would ease the sense of "crisis" among many Labour MPs at the government's response to the "rapid rise in far-right rhetoric and violence" and the "perma-presence in the media" of Nigel Farage. And it would signal an intent to "take on Farage and the hard right in the language of Labour values".

=== 2026 ===
On 9 June, protests occurred in Belfast, Northern Ireland following the knife attacks the day prior.

On 13 June 2026, protests were held in Glasgow following the 8 June Belfast knife attack in Northern Ireland. Thousands of protesters gathered in the city center, with their faces covered and others chanting and holding up the Union flag. Protests have also occurred in Edinburgh and Ayr. Police forces were deployed in Glasgow to contain the protests. At least 3 people have been arrested in Glasgow following the protests.

On 25 July 2026, protests occurred in Glasgow, originally anti-racism protests held in Glasgow Green at 11:00, a counter anti-immigration protests were held, with 1,700 people in total attending both events. Many masked people were arrested following violence and hate crime against immigrants. Police forces were deployed in the protests to contain and minimise disruption as well as ensuring public safety.

From 4–7 August 2026, protests took place in Thetford, Norfolk following plans of housing asylum seekers in RAF Burnham, located in Thetford. 5 protesters have been arrested and many asylum seekers have been escorted to safety.

On 5 September 2026, rallies were held in Dover, lead by Daniel Thomas, founder of Patriot Platform, following discussions to bring migrants boats to Dover on 6 September. Protesters in black clothing and balaclavas were blocking the roads for up to 2 hours. On the same day, protests and rallies were held in Portsmouth lasting until the next day, following the arrival of boats carrying 140 asylum seekers heading for Portsmouth. At least 3 people were detained, including a teenage boy. Several officers were injured following the protests.

On 22 September, Daniel Thomas was arrested for damaging a boat with a French rescuer on board in the English Channel, shouting "This is England, Its no longer France!" as well as calling for protests in Gosport where the migrants boat would arrive. On 23 September, he would livestream his arrest on Youtube.

On 24 October, anti- and pro-immigration protests happened in Kent. Members of the Kent Nationalist Movement organised the march in Herne Bay. Reports say a total of 180 people attended both rallies.

On 12 November, Daniel Thomas would plead guilty following attacks on a migrant boat.

== Concurrent events ==
=== Flags raised on streets ===
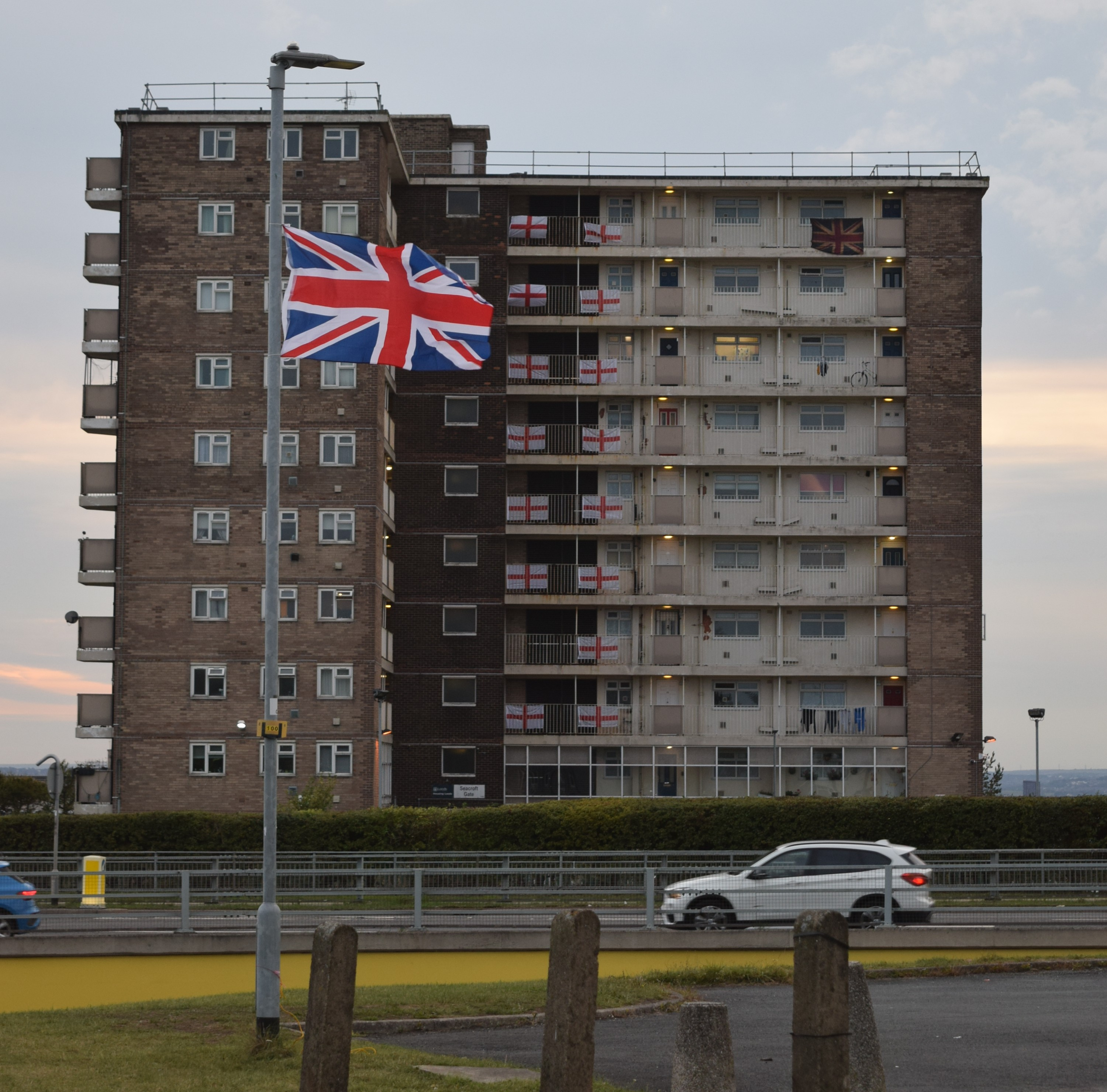
Flags hung on a block of flats in Seacroft, Leeds

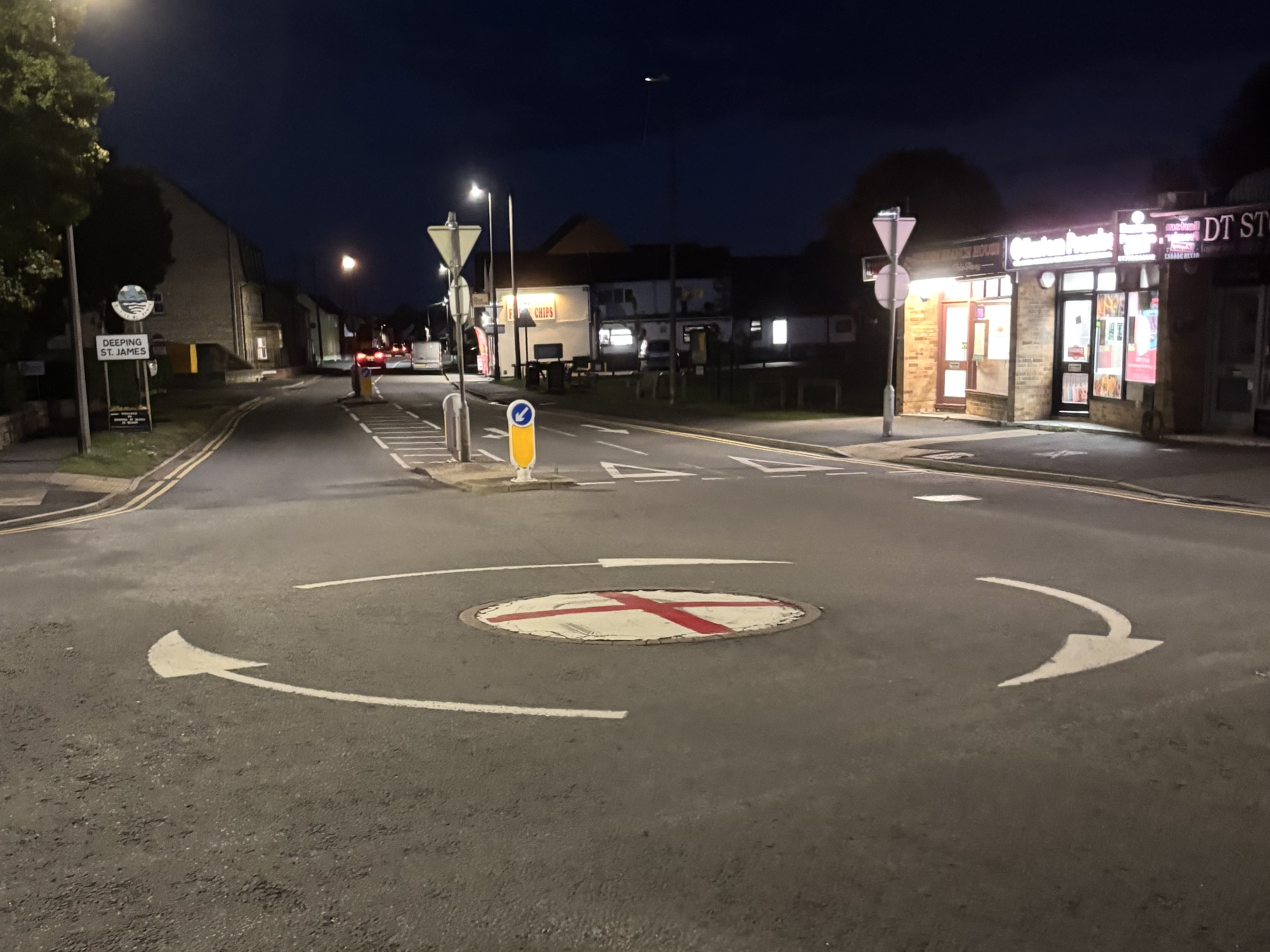
A Saint George's cross painted over a mini-roundabout in Market Deeping

In mid-July, Union Jacks and England flags began to be put up in Weoley Castle, a suburb of Birmingham, apparently by a group dubbed the "Weoley Warriors" who did so in response to a 12-year-old girl in nearby Rugby being stopped from making a speech at school about being British because she was wearing a Union Jack-themed dress. Initially the appearance of flags was confined to areas of Birmingham, but by mid-August this phenomenon had spread across the country, with thousands of flags being attached to lampposts; there have also been some cases of England flags being painted on mini-roundabouts.

Much of this has been assumed to be the work of "Operation Raise the Colours", a group that has encouraged people to put up flags and is alleged to have accepted a donation from the fascist organisation Britain First. According to the research group Hope Not Hate, it was co-founded by Andrew Currien, otherwise known as Andy Saxon, who has alleged links to the far-right groups English Defence League and Britain First. Lewis Nielsen of the research group has said it "was never about flags, it's about giving confidence to racists and fascists to target refugees and migrants."

=== Threats to lawyers and refugee NGOs ===
More than 150 lawyers, human rights, refugee and environmental organisations have signed a statement saying they are being "pressured into silence" after some received rape and death threats from far-right and anti-migrant protesters. At least two refugee non-governmental organisations (NGOs) that have been supporting asylum seekers have closed their offices after credible threats to their safety. Organisations including Liberty, Greenpeace, Care4Calais, Bail for Immigration Detainees, Choose Love, the Runnymede Trust and Freedom from Torture, as well as lawyers, including KCs, have signed the statement.

== Response ==
=== Political support ===
On 24 July, Epping Forest District Council unanimously voted in favour of urging the government to close the Bell Hotel in Epping, which was where the protests started. On 30 July, a letter to the home secretary calling for an urgent meeting discussing the use of hotels to house asylum seekers was signed by five Conservative politicians (two MPs, two County councillors, and the police, fire and crime commissioner for Essex; Kevin Bentley, Alex Burghart, Roger Hirst, Neil Hudson and Christopher Whitbread).

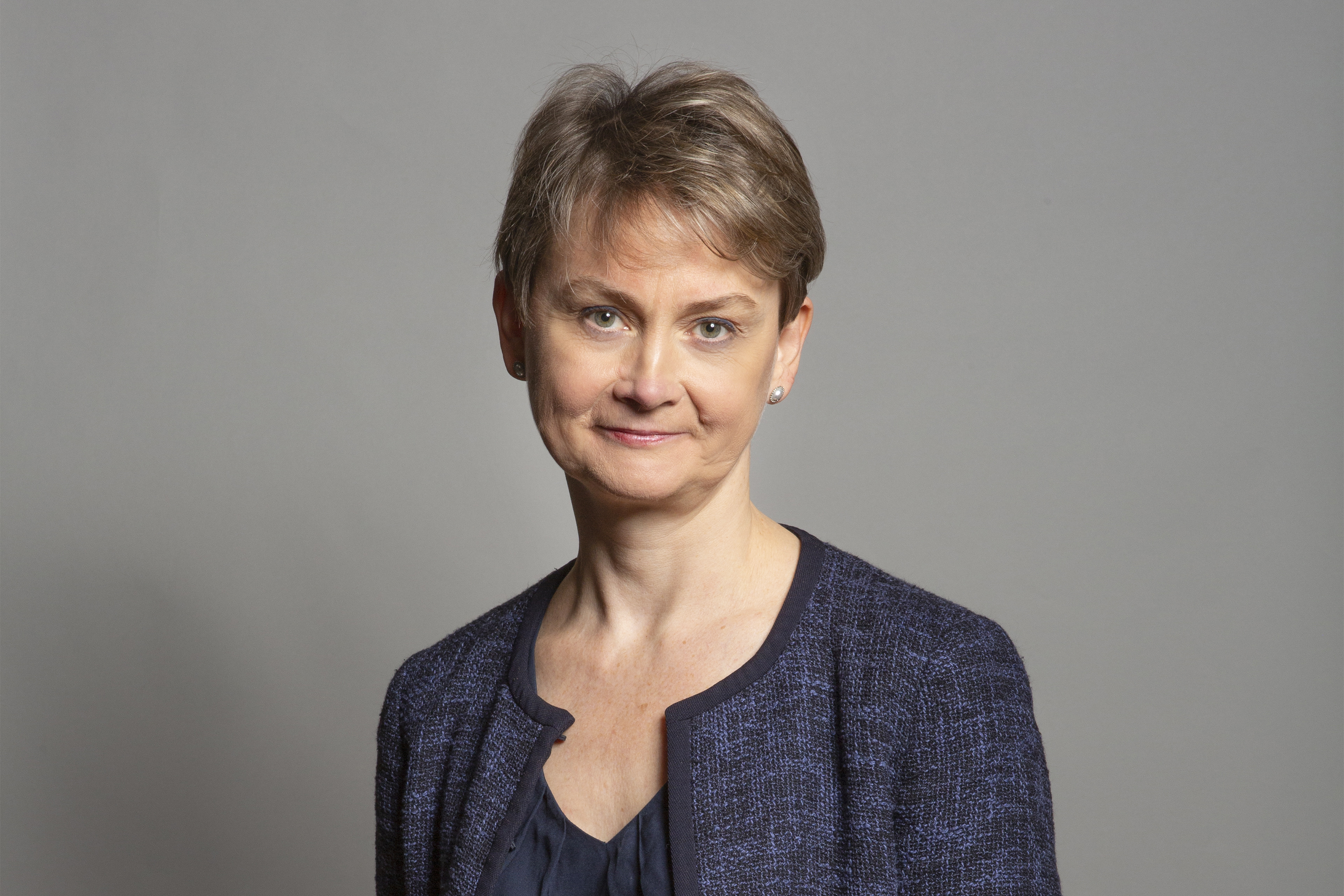
The home secretary Yvette Cooper said she agreed with "local councils and communities who want the asylum hotels in their communities closed".

Home Secretary Yvette Cooper expressed understanding for local concerns, stating she agreed with "local councils and communities who want the asylum hotels in their communities closed". Starmer said he "completely" understood residents' concerns, adding that "local people by and large do not want these hotels in their towns."

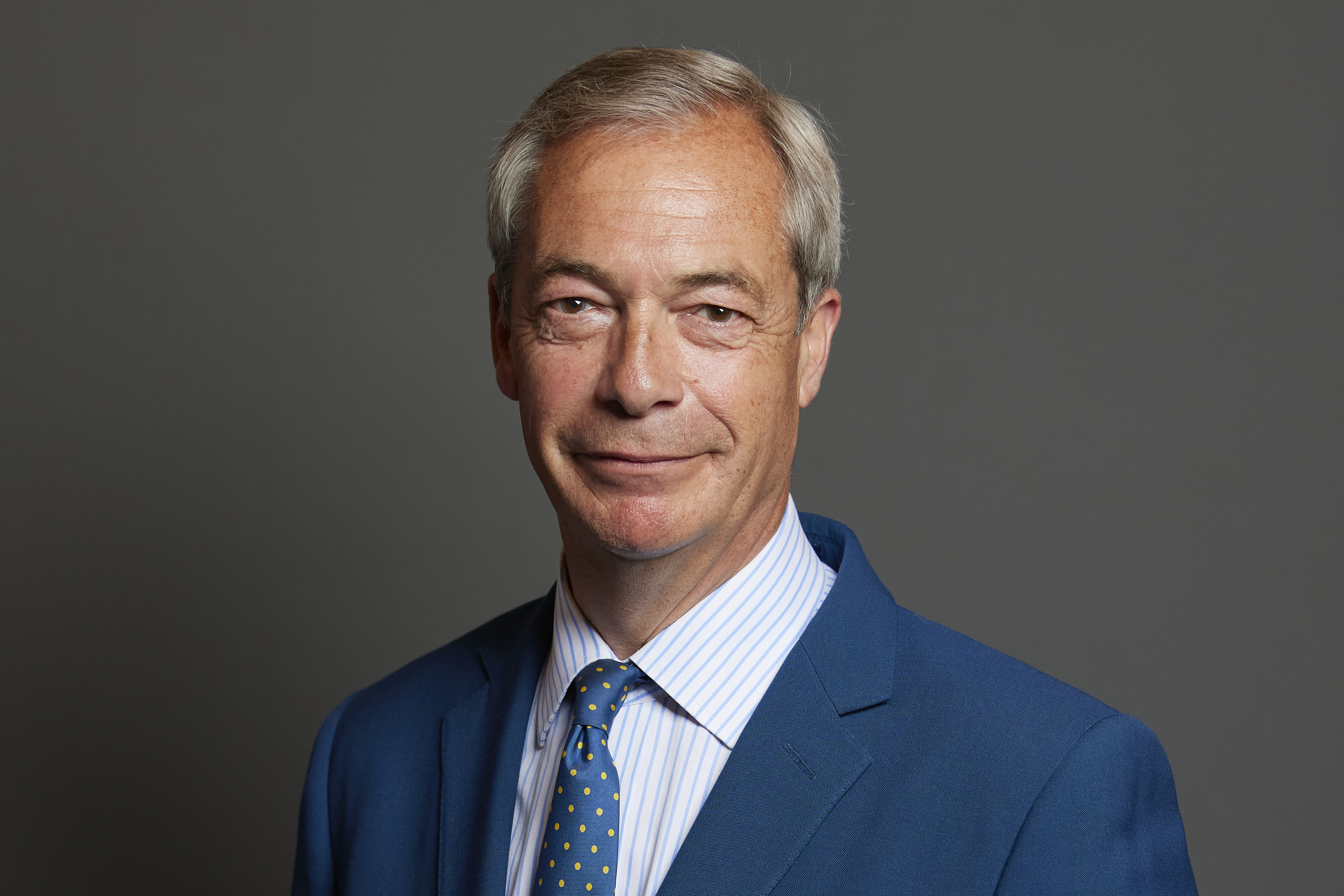
Nigel Farage, leader of Reform UK, called for protests outside asylum hotels and later announced plans for mass deportations of asylum seekers.

Reform UK leadership supported the Epping protests. Party leader Nigel Farage hoped they would inspire similar protests outside migrant hotels across the country to "put pressure on local councils to go to court" to try to block other hotels from housing asylum seekers.

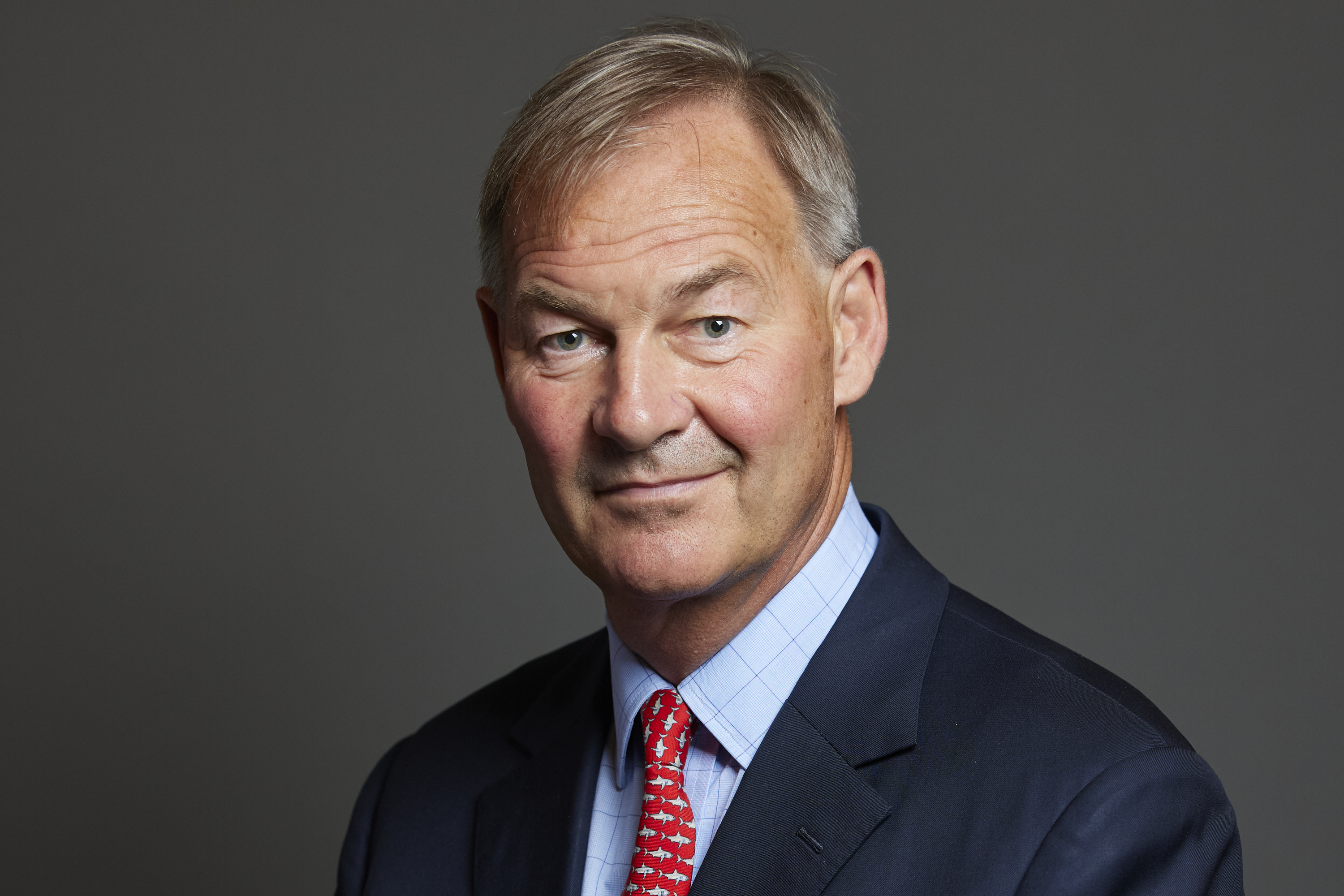
Rupert Lowe, former Reform UK MP who became an independent, advocated for mass deportations.

Former Reform UK MP Rupert Lowe, who later became independent, stated his support for "one million plus deportations" and posted on X "Detain. Deport. All of them." He argued that "legal immigration is a bigger problem than illegal immigration".

Several Conservative MPs also expressed support for local concerns about asylum hotels. Neil Hudson MP and Alex Burghart MP issued a joint statement calling for the immediate closure of the Bell Hotel and Phoenix Hotel, citing public safety concerns.

=== Political opposition ===
Some Labour MPs criticised their own government's approach to asylum policy, with concerns raised about echoing far-right rhetoric. Critics within the party objected to aspects of Starmer's immigration rhetoric, including accusations that he echoed Enoch Powell's Rivers of Blood speech.

Plaid Cymru Westminster leader Liz Saville Roberts challenged Starmer in Parliament, saying "This Prime Minister once spoke of compassion and dignity for migrants, and defending free movement. Now he talks of 'islands of strangers' and 'taking back control'." Current Plaid Cymru leader Rhun ap Iorwerth stated that some areas in Wales need more immigration, saying asylum seekers need to be "processed properly".

The Green Party, under new leader Zack Polanski elected in 2025, maintained opposition to anti-immigration rhetoric. Green MP Siân Berry joined counter-protests against far-right demonstrations in Brighton.

=== Counter-protests ===
Stand Up To Racism organised counter-protests across multiple locations where anti-asylum hotel demonstrations took place. Counter-demonstrations were held in cities including Liverpool, Bristol, Newcastle, Leeds, Bournemouth, and Cardiff, with protesters displaying banners reading "Refugees Welcome, Celebrate Diversity". The counter-protest organisers stated their opposition to what they called "far-right and fascist thugs" bringing "their message of hate" to local communities.

=== Legal actions ===
On 12 August, Epping Forest District Council applied for an interim injunction from the High Court to stop migrants being housed at the hotel.

On 15 August, Mr Justice Eyre ordered the hotel to refuse any new applications from asylum seekers until he had given his ruling following a hearing at the Royal Courts of Justice where he heard from both the council and the hotel's owners. Despite an effort from home secretary Yvette Cooper to get the case dismissed, the council was granted the injunction on 19 August, with all asylum seekers housed there to be moved out by 16:00 BST on 12 September.

Following the High Court ruling, the Home Office said the decision could "substantially impact" their ability to house asylum seekers, with fears that it may set a precedent and create pressure to find alternative accommodation sooner than expected. A number of councils subsequently said they would work to stop the use of hotels for housing asylum seekers, including all 12 councils controlled by Reform UK and the Conservative-run Broxbourne Borough Council.

On 29 August, Lord Justice Bean said the High Court ruling was "seriously flawed in principle" after overturning the injunction at the Court of Appeal.

On 11 November, Mr Justice Mould of the High Court ruled against a permanent injunction sought by the local district council against the use of the Bell hotel.

=== Asylum seekers ===
Speaking to the BBC, asylum seekers living in hotels in the South East have said that due to the demonstrations they are afraid to go outside, and in a "state of constant anxiety".

=== "Pink Ladies" ===
The Pink Ladies are a British women-led anti-immigration group that started in 2025. They began in Epping, Essex and their main focus is against immigration and the use of hotels for asylum seekers, framing it as a threat to women's and girls' safety. After that, local groups using the Pink Ladies name showed up in parts of the United Kingdom.

The group was founded by Orla Minihane, a former Reform UK activist. The Pink Ladies have been talked about by New Statesman and Semafor as part of a rise in women's involvement in British anti-immigration activism. The anti-fascist magazine Searchlight has characterised the group as far-right.

== Policing costs ==
Policing repeat protests has caused significant increase in costs for local police forces. In late September 2025, ITV News reported that in Epping protesters had gathered "twice a week, almost every week, since mid-July". Essex police said their response had required a "substantial level" of resources, telling a crime panel meeting that cost of policing protests in Epping could reach £1.7m by October.

More than £100,000 was spent in August to manage the several protests that happened across Hampshire and the Isle of Wight.

In September, the Northumbria Police and Crime Commissioner, Susan Dungworth, said that weekly demonstrations at an asylum hotel had strained police resources.

== See also ==
- Opposition to immigration
- Illegal immigration to the United Kingdom
