= Operation Raise the Colours =

2025 campaign to display English and British flags

- Part of United Kingdom anti-immigration protests (2025-present) and Far-right politics in the United Kingdom
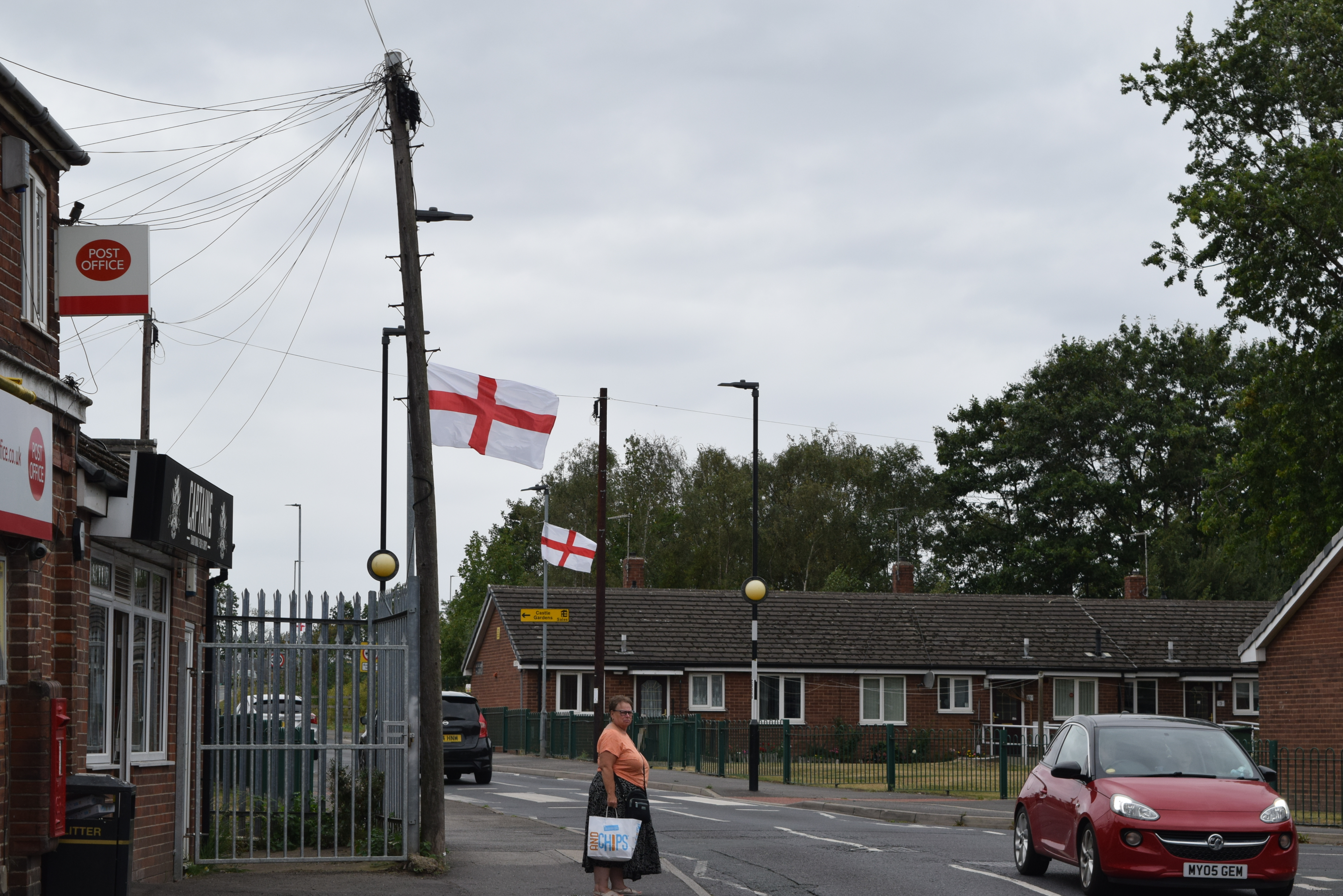
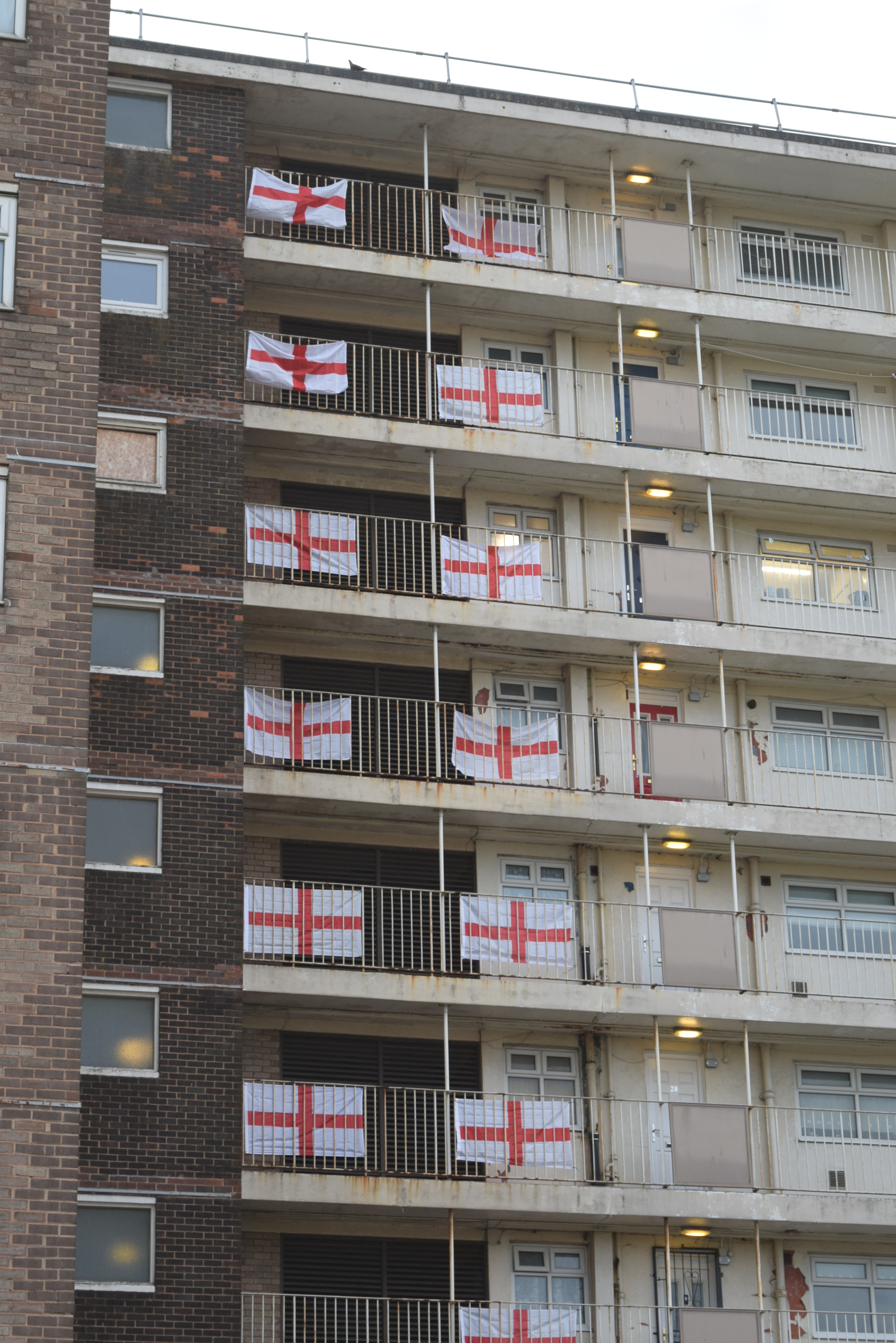
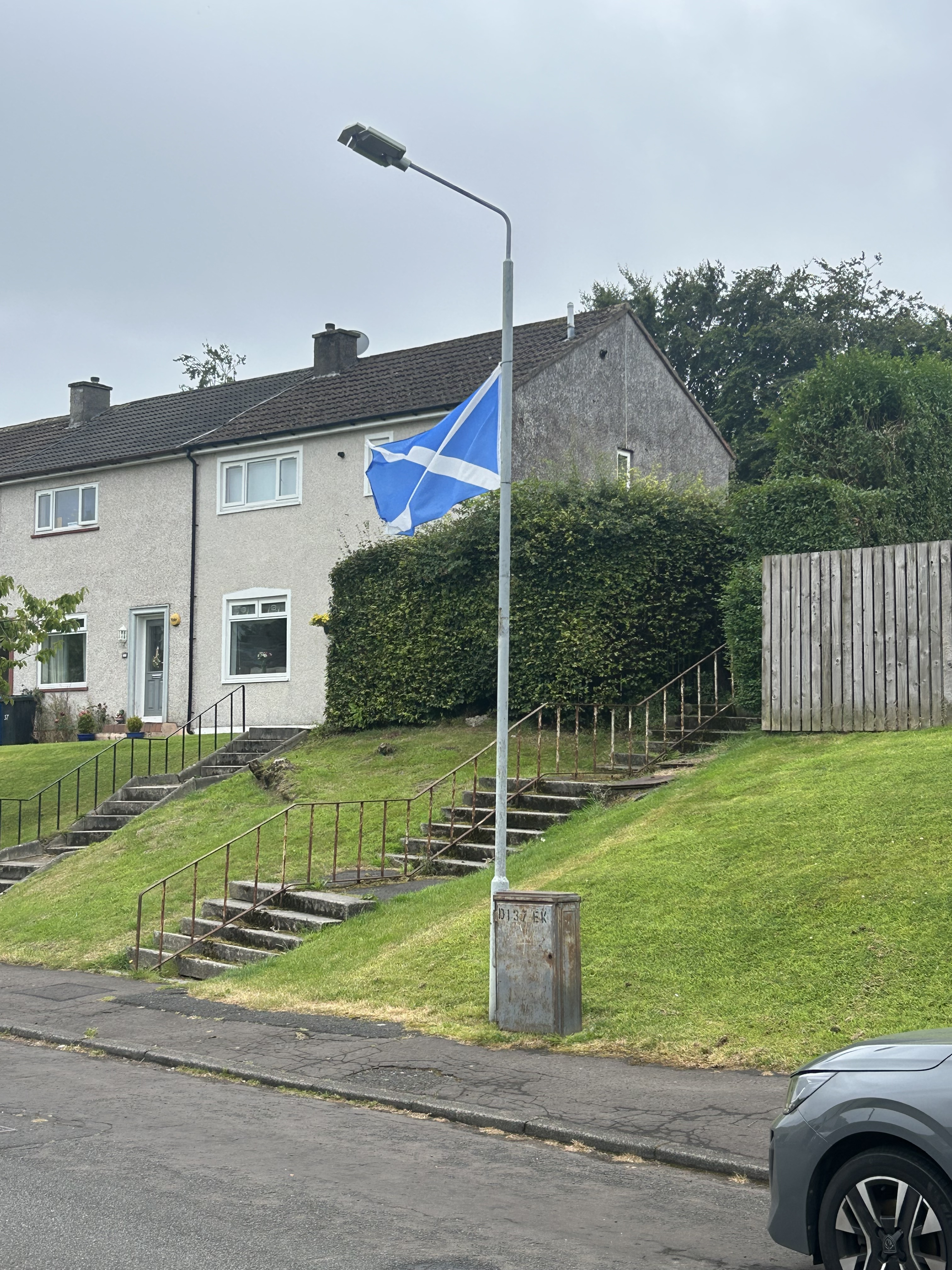
- Clockwise from top: England flags tied to lampposts and telegraph poles, Pontefract, England; Flag of Scotland tied to a lamppost; A block of deck-access flats in Seacroft, Leeds
- Date: August 2025 – present
- Location: Great Britain
- Methods: Tying the flags of the four nations and Union Flag to lampposts; Painting flags onto buildings and roundabouts
- Status: Ongoing

Operation Raise the Colours is a campaign movement primarily in England, Scotland and Wales consisting of groups that display the Union Flag and/or the English, Scottish or Welsh flag in public places. The campaign began in August 2025 and aroused controversy centring on the flag of England due to its history of use by anti-immigration nationalists. The movement has involved tying flags to lampposts and painting them onto mini-roundabouts. By September 2025 the movement had spread to both Scotland and Wales. There have been many reports of abuse of and threats to council staff responsible for removing the flags. Some members of flagging groups have engaged in anti-migrant vigilantism in northern France and on the streets of Paris.

Supporters of the campaign argue that the movement aims to promote patriotism, but the campaign's supporters and organisers include figures and organisations associated with or belonging to the far-right, including the fascist political party Britain First and the anti-Islam campaigner Tommy Robinson.

Anti-racist campaign groups such as Stand Up to Racism and Hope Not Hate have expressed opposition to the movement, arguing that it is a cynical attempt by the far-right to promote their ideas, inflame tensions and intimidate immigrants, asylum seekers and other ethnic minorities at a time of rising anti-immigration sentiment in the UK. A number of different groups and individuals have claimed to have begun the movement, including the Weoley Warriors, the Raise the Colours group and Andrew Currien, the latter having alleged links to the English Defence League and Britain First according to Hope Not Hate.

Opinion polling in October 2025 showed that both white and ethnic minority adults surveyed tended to view the campaign as primarily being an expression of an anti-migrant or anti–ethnic minority message, rather than of patriotism.

== Historical context ==
In the context of the emergence of Operation Raise the Colours, anthropologist Dominic Bryan wrote in September 2025 that symbols such as flags "are multi-vocal. They offer a range of meanings that depend on who is using them and the context in which they are being used. If the symbols are being used to send a message, the intended recipient of that message adds another layer of meaning."

According to a report issued by the Institute of Race Relations "there is a long history of flags being used by far right nationalists to symbolise ‘Englishness’, a nostalgia for Empire and racism directed at minorities, often masked by thin claims of symbolising ‘patriotism’." The report notes that the Union Jack and St George's Cross were used by the National Front, a fascist political party, on demonstrations in the 1970s and 1980s. In April 1986, Conservative, Labour and Social Democratic and Labour party MPs discussed in parliament the need for measures that would have made it an offence to fly the Union Flag as part of demonstrations that were intended to stir up racial hatred. The use of the Union flag by the National Front is seen by some as an offensive co-option of the flag, "particularly for those who had a personal memory of rallying behind the Union Jack during the second world war, only to come back to the UK to see fascists using the flag in their parades". In the 1990s and 2000s, the flags were used extensively by the British National Party and the English Defence League.

Those opposed to the far-right are split on whether they can be reclaimed by those who wish to see them as more inclusive symbols. After the start of Operation Raise the Colours in summer 2025, the chair of the Royal Society of Saint George told the Washington Post, "We’ve had it as our flag since the 1300s. … It’s only in the last few years that it’s been taken by extremists, and we need to take it back." By contrast, a Stand Up to Racism spokesperson said "I associate the flag with the far right. I don’t think you can reclaim the St. George’s Cross. The legacy of Britain, of colonialism and slavery, means for many people across the world it’s a hated flag associated with subjugation."

Political psychologist Tabitha Baker Revuelta writes that use of flags "had been appropriated by far-right groups" and that such "associations rendered flag display a contested practice, within wider struggles over identity, legitimacy, and political belonging". She notes that Operation Raise the Colours "emerged amid wider tensions surrounding asylum policy, immigration, national identity, and far-right mobilisation".

== Flag raising campaign ==
=== Origins in England ===
An online campaign called Operation Raise the Colours was founded in August 2025, calling for the public display of the Union Jack and the flags of the four nations of the United Kingdom. The stated aim of the campaign was to promote national pride and patriotism. The campaign has involved activists tying up flags on to lampposts and street furniture, as well being painted on to mini-roundabouts and zebra crossings.

One of a number of people who claims to have founded the movement is Andrew Currien, who according to the advocacy group Hope Not Hate has alleged links to the English Defence League and Britain First. Currien has thanked Britain First for donating flags to the campaign.

A number of groups associated with the campaign have emerged across the country. In Birmingham, a group called the Weoley Warriors said they were responsible for raising flags in Weoley Castle, Northfield, Bartley Green and other nearby areas. Another group, Raise the Colours, installed flags in south Birmingham and north Worcestershire. Both the Weoley Warriors and Raise the Colours also claim to be responsible for starting the national movement.

Another allied group called Flag Force UK said they were responsible for raising flags across York in Yorkshire, and has also set up a live map of flags in the region. In Worcestershire, the Wythall Flaggers launched a campaign to raise flags around Wythall.

In Greater Manchester a group called Churchill's Lions, with connections to the leadership of Britain First, said they were responsible for the majority of the flags. An investigation by a journalist at Manchester Mill found this group included co-leader of Britain First Ashlea Simon and a man who was convicted of being part of a five-person illegal immigration operation and sentenced to 20 months in prison after being stopped at the border with four migrants in his van in 2016.

Only a few weeks earlier, the Saint George's Cross had been widely flown in cities and towns across England as a show of support for the England women's national football team in the UEFA Women's Euro 2025.

In late November 2025, a man fell from a ladder while putting up flags on lampposts in South Bristol and died in hospital in early December.

Research by political psychologist Tabitha Baker Revuelta analyses Operation Raise the Colours as a case of grievance politics. Through an analysis of social media posts associated with the campaign, she concludes that it has involved three patterns of grievance construction: "Perceptions of institutional unfairness and cultural marginalisation framed flag-raising as resistance; narratives of national decline positioned it as cultural restoration; and concerns over insufficient recognition made flag visibility a means of asserting collective worth". Baker Revuelta writes that "Criticism of flag-raising as racist appeared to galvanise supporters, reinforcing their claims that legitimate patriotism was being unfairly stigmatised".

=== Scotland and Wales ===
By September 2025, the movement had spread to Scotland and Wales, with the Red Dragon, Saltire and Lion Rampant, the flag of Wales and the flag and royal banner of Scotland, being raised there in a similar fashion alongside the Union Jack.

In Scotland, occurrences were located in areas such as Falkirk, Maryhill and Tollcross in Glasgow, as well as Peterhead, Edinburgh, Inverness and Aberdeen. Parts of Lanarkshire were also affected.

In Glasgow, the flags were raised by a group called the Tartan Team, which are part of the Operation Raise the Colours movement. The Daily Record reported that one man organising it had made racist posts on his social media, replying to a video of an alleged fight between asylum seekers in Spain with the comment "gas them all" and also shared content claiming "the answer for America lies… in Germany with a man named Adolf". The man initially claimed mistaken identity but when pressed by a journalist, responded "Everybody is entitled to their own opinion. I understand that Hitler went nuts at the end. No wonder, the drugs do that to most people. But at the start he had good intentions. Maybe they slipped a bit but he had good intentions for his country".

In Wales, Welsh flags and Union Jacks appeared in Anglesey, Carmarthenshire, Conwy and Denbighshire. There were also incidents of the English St George's Cross appearing in Pembrokeshire, Llandudno and Cwmbran to the bemusement and protests of local residents. Wrexham County Borough Council stated that it would not be removing flags erected in Wrexham "unless they pose a health and safety hazard on our roads." The decision has attracted controversy in the area, prompting a formal complaint in June 2026 from former North Wales Police and Crime Commissioner Arfon Jones, who described the council's position as a "whitewash". Later that month, Wales Online reported that members of Welsh nationalist organisation Mudiad Eryr Wen (lit. 'movement of the white eagle') had removed a Union Jack, an English flag and an Ulster loyalist banner from lampposts near Wrexham A.F.C.'s Racecourse Ground.

=== Legality ===
Section 132(2) of the Highways Act 1980 states it is an offence to affix any items to structures on the public highway without permission from the relevant highways authority.

=== Condition of flags ===
Weather-tattered union and England flags originally attached to a lamppost by Raise the Colours, Birmingham

By late 2025, many flags originally put up in late summer and autumn that year were reported to be in poor condition, due to the effects of the weather, with reports about the "tatty" state of flags continuing into summer 2026.

In Birmingham, the council has stated that flags attached to highways infrastructure without authorisation have in places obscured traffic control cameras and road signs.

== Links with the far-right ==
Public organisations, journalists, political figures and academics have questioned the motives of the Raise the Colours campaign after it transpired that several far-right activists and organisations, including Britain First and senior far-right activist Tommy Robinson, had supported and promoted the campaign. Former Tommy Robinson bodyguard and far-right activist Daniel "Tommo" Thomas was a prominent member of the movement until he fell out with Raise the Colours co-founder Ryan Bridge in January 2026. Nick Ireland, the Liberal Democrat leader of Dorset Council, warned in August 2025 that the campaign had been "hijacked" by the far-right to promote their extremist agenda and said that flying flags could intimidate residents because of this alleged far-right association. The Socialist Worker also said the far-right had "co-opted" it. Guardian writer Esther Addley has written that the campaign is "an organised and well funded movement that, while certainly galvanising support among many individuals, has been driven and encouraged by figures with links to the far right". Supporters of the campaign have denied links to the far-right or any racial motivation, stating that they only wish to promote patriotism and welcome the involvement of volunteers from any political, racial or ethnic backgrounds.

Anti-racist organisation Stand Up to Racism expressed its opposition to the campaign and organised counter-protests against Raise the Colours campaigners putting up flags. The group, citing the campaign's support by Robinson and Britain First, said that it is an intentional attempt by the far-right to spread their ideas, inflame tensions and intimidate asylum seekers, immigrants, Muslims and other minority groups amid rising anti-immigration sentiment in the United Kingdom. Anti-racist group Hope not Hate have said that some of the campaign's organising had been implemented by far-right activists. Academics Dave Featherstone, Jenny Morrison and Ewan Gibbs have written that the "campaign has created a powerful visible presence for a far right whose partisans are often comparatively atomised, having been drawn to the movement through social media".

Anthropologist Dominic Bryan, who has researched the use of flags in Northern Ireland for more than 20 years, has commented on the phenomenon in Great Britain that: "We've heard predictable claims that the flags are just a display of pride in a British or English identity. This is an easy claim to make as it clearly is, in part, to do with nationalistic pride. The point is that they are being hung in particular places, by particular groups of people and in a particular way that clearly links them to the ongoing debates and hostility to migration". Historian Camilla Schofield cites Operation Raise the Colours as an example of "the contemporary global ascendancy of ethno-nationalism and the ideological capture of national symbols by fascist groups across the UK". Historian of British fascism Nigel Copsey writes that as Operation Raise the Colours established an online presence, it "prompted copycat efforts... These efforts either took the form of self-identified crews of local ‘flaggers’ or remained more ad-hoc. Whatever, they drew sustenance from the far right." Expert on far-right politics George Newth wrote that "Bearing all the hallmarks of a carefully coordinated 'astroturf' campaign (stimulating grassroots support for a cause and then using that support to legitimise other activities), raise the colours contributed to an emboldening of the far right." Oxford professor Dan Hicks called Operation Raise the Colours a "far-right astroturf (that is, fake grassroots) campaign" that was "transforming a flag into a racist, nativist symbol that marks territory as a protest against immigration".

Sociologists Rohanna Bell and Tahir Abbas wrote that Operation Raise the Colours "presents itself as a grassroots civic initiative, although its organisational core comprises individuals with documented links to the British far-right" and described it as "one local instance of a wider European pattern in which far-right infrastructures have shifted from spectacular protest into the durable production of everyday environment". Political psychologist Tabitha Baker Revuelta notes that members of the campaign have presented it as "grassroots", but that such a characterisation "requires qualification". She writes that "Although ORC developed through decentralised forms of participation, including local groups of self-described ‘flaggers’ and more ad-hoc activity, existing research has linked the campaign to far-right activism." Baker Revuelta notes the role of Andrew Currien in founding the campaign but also that "At the same time, the campaign spread through social media and messaging platforms, prompting locally organised and less formally coordinated flag-raising activities across different areas".

Research by the Institute of Race Relations suggests that Operation Raise the Colours may have served to provide a recruitment route into more militant forms of far-right vigilantism.

On social media, the Weoley Warriers have shared photographs taken by a member of the group at the Unite the Kingdom march organised by Tommy Robinson in London and shared posts by Polish far-right MEP Dominik Tarczyński, who also attended the march. According to Searchlight, Britain First leader Paul Golding spoke at an event on 15 November organised by a flagging group in Kent. Photographs published by Searchlight showed him drinking in a pub with two local flagging organisers. In Wolverhampton on the same date, a Patriotic Alternative banner was displayed directly in front of a large "Raise the Colours" flag at a protest.

The campaign has prompted debate around the meaning of Britain's national flags, patriotism and the potential links of these flags to the far-right and racist movements. Commenting on the campaign in August 2025, black academic Kehinde Andrews said Saint George's Cross was a "clear symbol of racism" because of its use by far-right anti-immigration activists against immigrants from the Windrush generation in the 1950s and 1960s, stating that it represents "that Britishness, Englishness, is white", whereas the flags of Scotland and Wales are not racist because these countries had historically been "oppressed" by England. However, others such as black singer-songwriter Rachel Chinouriri have argued that the flag can be reclaimed despite its racial connotations, with Chinouriri stating that she was proud to be English and to use the flag. Harry Clarke-Ezzidio of the New Statesman asked ethnic minorities in Birmingham what they thought of the campaign and the flags to a mixed response, with some expressing concern and unease while others supported the campaign and the flags.

The campaign has been met with a similar backlash in Scotland and has prompted similar discussion around the use and meaning of the Scottish Saltire. Right-wing activists have used the campaign as an opportunity to "reclaim" the flag from the Scottish National Party and the Scottish independence movement, which the Saltire has long been associated with. BBC News asked ethnic minorities in Glasgow and other towns in Scotland about their views on the Saltire with a mixed response, with some stating that the flag-raising campaign made them feel uncomfortable and fearful of racial discrimination while others said they were proud and supportive of the flag. In response to concerns that the Saltire was being co-opted by the far-right, First Minister John Swinney said in September 2025 that the Saltire must be a "flag of welcome" and that he would fight to ensure the Saltire would remain a "an inclusive flag, which is there to draw all of us together in Scotland as an essential part of our national identity". Former first minister Nicola Sturgeon called for people to "calm down a little bit about flags" and raised concerns that the spread of the Scottish Saltire was more about anti-immigration sentiment than national pride.

According to political scientists Harriet Gray, Phoebe Martin and Audrey Reeves, the campaign, along with protests at hotels housing asylum seekers and the September 2025 Unite the Kingdom rally, "centre, as racist and nationalist narratives so often do, on the idea that racialized, othered men pose a sexualized threat to ‘our’ women". Historian Will Ranger writes that the campaign was motivated by a desire amongst its participants "to fight back against a perception that Britishness itself was under threat from a vaguely defined Other including Muslims, liberals, environmentalists, transgender activists, and socialists". He states that "The sudden revival of interest in being overly proud of flying the English and British flags is a clear mimicking of American flag culture, but also suggests that the British Right is clinging to these symbols because of their insecurity about the changing nature of the UK".

In June 2026, The i Paper reported that "A number of faces that once appeared in Raise the Colours videos have disappeared from [its] broadcasts, which now primarily feature just [Ryan] Bridge". The paper reports that while some previous members no longer appear in videos posted by the group on social media, "newer faces are appearing in their clips – including one man Bridge interviewed and spent time with in London and Shrewsbury, who has posted a video of himself on Instagram doing a fist-salute while holding a banner that reads 'Aryan Power' and a photo wearing a t-shirt with neo-nazi symbols, such as the Aryan Fist on."

According to Searchlight, Britain First leader Paul Golding was due to address a protest organised by local flag-raising group Raise The Flags Shrewsbury Plus in August 2026, but announced the evening before that he was ill, leaving Ryan Bridge as the main speaker.

== Council, police and residents' responses ==
Several local councils, including Birmingham City Council, City of York Council and Tower Hamlets London Borough Council among others, have taken down the flags, citing safety concerns and a lack of permission to fly these on council property. Birmingham City Council subsequently stopped removing flags, noting that these removals "have unfortunately been met with hostility and abuse and we must consider workers' safety". Others, including Basildon Borough Council, Harlow District Council, Lancashire County Council and several others, have supported the flags and ordered council staff not to take any down, defending it as an expression of patriotism. Writing in the Daily Mail in August 2025, the Conservative Party leader Kemi Badenoch expressed the view that it was "shameful" for local councils to remove the flags.

Other councils also reported that their staff had faced abuse when they tried to take down flags, while anti-racism campaigners in Glasgow said they experienced death threats when taking them down. In Maidenhead, a man was arrested for a racially or religiously aggravated public order offence after he allegedly abused council workers removing a flag. York Central MP Rachael Maskell reported that workers removing flags had been assaulted and that a death threat had appeared on the city walls. Council workers subsequently wore masks for protection, as a result of the "serious organised harassment and intimidation" they faced.

In Brighton and Hove, council contractors had to abandon the removal of flags after they faced abuse. Hertfordshire County Council also stated that highways contractors experienced abuse and threatening behaviour when they attempted to take flags down from lamp posts, and that the workers would have to operate with police protection. The council in Knowsley reported that contractors removing flags had faced "completely unacceptable" threats, stating that the "strongest penalties" would be imposed on the offenders. Trafford Council paused the removal of flags after a staff member was abused in the street and threatened on social media. In Sheffield, the council's highways contractor, Amey plc, reported that its staff were taking down flags in teams rather than alone, for safety reasons. The manager of the street cleaning contract told a council meeting that "It was quite shocking how we were treated by the public. It was very threatening and very aggressive". Shropshire Council said that flags would stay up except for safety or maintenance reasons.

Kent County Council (KCC) told Harrietsham parish council that flags would have to be removed in the village before traditional Christmas lights could be installed on the lampposts. The leader of Warwickshire County Council said that the local authority would be removing some flags in order to enable Christmas lights to be put up.

The leaders of the Scottish National Party, Liberal Democrat, Labour, and Conservative groups on Aberdeen City Council issued a joint statement in early December, condemning threats made against council workers who had been removing flags from lampposts as they installed Christmas lights in late November 2025.

In September 2025, Derby City Council stated that it would begin removing flags. In January 2026, it was reported that 950 had been removed.

According to the Bristol Post, Bristol City Council "has taken a softer approach on removing them than other councils". In January 2026, the council agreed to start taking down flags "gradually" after discussing a petition calling for their removal. It had previously allowed most flags to remain, with its leader Tony Dyer stating in summer 2025 that they would only be removed where there were safety concerns, arguing that there was a need to "reclaim our flag" from those who had "hijacked" it and "reclaim the fact the flag represents all of us in England". Dyer stated that police or security staff would accompany workers removing flags where necessary. Another councillor cited both distress experienced by residents where flags had been put up and the deteriorating condition of the flags, which he stated were making the city appear "unsightly". In October 2026, an update provided to the council's public health and communities policy committee reported that the latest count had revealed that there were 371 flags flying from lampposts in the city, down from a peak of more than 1,000 in June. The councillor providing the update stated that "the trend is now positive and I want to gradually see all of those flags on public property removed. But I do think as a city and as a country, we do need to perhaps be more proud of our flags as symbols of national unity, and display them more properly at public buildings, as we do all the time here at City Hall."

In April 2026, a ward councillor in Darlington said that residents had contacted her to report that the integrity of lampposts outside their houses had been compromised by people climbing them to put up flags, and that the posts were now "waving" in the wind, leading to safety concerns. A spokesperson for Darlington Borough Council said that "Climbing or attaching items to lamp posts can be dangerous, as they aren’t designed to take the extra weight".

In some areas local residents have grouped together to remove the flags themselves. In Faversham a group called Faversham Against Racism formed and flyered for a planned "community clean up" to "de-flag" the town. In York a group called the International Flagging Committee raised money through donations to buy flags from across the world, aiming to create "a cityscape that looks like we are hosting the next Olympics". In Caerphilly, South Wales, a road bridge in Pontllanfraith was decorated with flags from countries from across the world. An initiative named the 'Everyone Welcome' project was started in response in Manchester, with artists customising St George's flags with messages celebrating diversity. In Oxford, local members of the Quakers designed a tool to remove flags when the council initially removed only those flags that it considered hazardous and council workers faced abuse and intimidation.

In Stirchley, Birmingham, local residents organised a community event on 18 October, at which they hung "love not hate" artwork. Police were called and tried to separate the residents and members of Raise the Colours who had turned up after conversation became heated. In Harborne, also in Birmingham, flags were removed, to which local councillor Jayne Francis responded: "Thanks to those responsible for removing. 99% of people who contacted me last week were uncomfortable with their presence (and were not asked if they wanted them)". In neighbouring Bearwood, a local activist took flags down after other residents told him that their presence made them feel unwelcome. Later, he was the subject of racist messages on X and was called a "foreigner", with one person messaging calling for him to be "detained and deported". In Didsbury a political advisor was taking down flags he passed whilst cycling to the gym after which he was confronted by a man at a nearby pub who said he was responsible for putting them up, later he told the Manchester Evening News, "I am sick of patriotism being stolen and used as a message of deliberate intimidation." A man taking down a flag in Norwich said he was surrounded by a group who had arrived by car and attacked him, smashing his head into the pavement. The police subsequently told him that they could not investigate as no CCTV evidence was available.

On 27 January 2026, a petition was presented to Birmingham City Council, calling on the council to act against flagging groups in the city. On 4 February 2026, the group Raise the Colours put flags up in the Birmingham suburb of Moseley for the first time. According to the Birmingham Mail, the local councillor "tried to inform them that they are committing an offence under S132 Highways Act 1980 but they continued flagging". On 6 February, "Moseley councillors said on Facebook that the council would be removing the flags in 'urgent' action, supported by West Midlands Police". On 7 February, several hundred people took part in a 'Moseley Is For Everyone' event and took down the flags.

According to an Institute of Race Relations researcher, "Whenever flags had gone up, it had been met with community resistance, which had had the opposite effect of actually bringing people together".

In early February 2026, Labour-led Rotherham Council announced that it would take down "scraggy" flags because they were becoming "disrespectful to a proud nation", but that it would be offering grants of £500 to community groups or parish councils to support the installation of flagpoles to fly a union or England flag from. The council's leaders said that they wanted flags to be a "symbol of unity" rather than "surrender[ing] them to extremist or far-right groups". The council was subsequently accused of appeasing the far right. A spokesperson for Stand Up To Racism Rotherham, whose mosque was vandalised with a St George's flag following a riot in which demonstrators attempted to set fire to a hotel housing asylum seekers in 2024, expressed concern that the grants would "give the far right confidence".

On 19 February 2026, a group called Raise the Flags Shrewsbury Plus put flags up in the town of Church Stretton, a town that is known to fly many flags all year round and is known locally as "the town of flags". The group said the flags were put up because they had received a donation specifically to do so in that area. The mayor subsequently reported that he had "received phone calls from a number of women who had gone out to see what the commotion was, and they were threatened and abused by the people putting up the flags". The person who put up the flags said that nobody was threatened and the police who investigated the event said that no crimes had been committed. The mayor also said that the town's large population of military veterans felt that the flags disrespected their service, stating "They're saying: 'Look at the way that those flags are being tied up with bits of string and cable ties, just left uncropped, and it's disgusting that you have that sort of disrespect'." Some of the flags have since been taken down by residents.

In April 2026, Shropshire Council announced that it would remove flags that had been flown from lampposts without authorisation, citing safety concerns after recent storms had left many of the flags loose or torn. The council said that it would seek the recover the removal costs from those who had put the flags up. It also stated that it was going to develop a funding bid for a "positive alternative" to the unauthorised flags, similar to an artist-led initiative in Stourbridge. In May 2026, the council stated that it intended to start prosecuting people who attached flags to lampposts without permission.

The leader of Hertsmere borough council, Jeremy Newmark, who is Jewish, called elements of Operation Raise the Colours 'an attempt by a bunch of criminals, extremists and nonces to hijack our national flag'. In response, on 21 September 2025, members of White Vanguard put up Union flags outside a property in Borehamwood, Essex that they falsely believed belonged to Newmark. The day after, White Vanguard described the council leader as a 'traitor' and 'Zionist Jew'.

=== Cultural responses ===
In Stourbridge in March 2026, a public artist got permission from Dudley Council to fly 60 flags designed by students from a local college from lampposts on the town's ring road. The project, Hearts of Stourbridge, which was funded by the Arts Council England, celebrates "the identity, creativity and voices of Stourbridge's young people". According to the BBC, "Part of the mission is to combat negativity some had associated with the mass organisation of flying national flags without authorisation across town and cities in recent months", with the artist viewing it as "a response rather than a counter protest".

As part of the 2026 International Day of Birmingham festival in September, a Birmingham-based textile artist displayed Re-Union Jack, a large union flag made of worn and ripped polyester flags removed from lampposts in the city, sewn and stuck together by participants in a three-month community project. The flag features signatures signatures of local figures, including a descendant of James Watt and members of bands Steel Pulse and UB40. The artist said that the project was a reaction to Raise the Colours' flag-raising, which "has caused division in communities across the country". She described the reimagined flags as "covered in the names of influential people in the Midlands who mean a lot to people and who make the Midlands this magical melting pot that we have". Ryan Bridge posted a video on social media calling the artwork "a disgrace" and accusing Birmingham City Council of stealing the flags from lampposts.

=== Criminal charges and convictions ===
On 24 March 2026, a group including Ryan Bridge from Raise the Colours attached flags to lampposts on Abingdon Road in Oxford. According to the Oxford Clarion, "The videos posted by Raise the Colours show non-stop animosity between the flag team and local residents, pedestrians and cyclists". The Oxford Mail reported that Bridge said during his livestream of the action: "Oxford’s mental, it’s full of absolute lunatics who hate that flag, and hate the flag of their country". A local woman who questioned the group about why they were illegally raising flags said "There’s a level of impunity there that is shocking. I’ve never experienced anything like it."

The police subsequently opened an investigation into an incident which "allegedly involved a cherry picker blockading access in Abingdon Road on Tuesday evening, March 24 and residents being unhappy with the presence of those putting flags up". Oxford East MP Anneliese Dodds stated: “If people want to erect the England flag outside their own home that of course is their right. However that is not what has happened here, where it appears people who do not live in the neighbourhood were involved, who imposed themselves on the residents of Abingdon Road and disrupted traffic in the rush hour in the process." The following week, the police announced that they had arrested an unnamed 44-year-old man from Bromsgrove "on suspicion of causing racially and religiously aggravated harassment, alarm or distress". The man was subsequently named by the press as Ryan Bridge. Bridge was released on police bail. He posted a video on Facebook following his release from custody, in which he said that his bail conditions including not visiting Oxfordshire.

In September 2026, following a Thames Valley Police investigation, Bridge was charged with 14 offences alleged to have been committed across Oxfordshire between 31 January and 31 March. The alleged offences include seven counts of using threatening words or behaviour to cause harassment, alarm or distress; three of using threatening, abusive or insulting words or behaviour with intent to cause fear of, or provoke, unlawful violence; two of racially aggravated intentional harassment, alarm or distress; and one count each of racially aggravated fear of violence and common assault. Bridge appeared in front of Oxford Magistrates' Court on 3 November, where he entered not guilty pleas. He is scheduled to appear at Oxford Crown Court on 3 December for a plea and trial preparation hearing in relation to incidents alleged to have taken place on 24 March. The charges for these alleged offences are three of racially aggravated harassment, one of common assault and one public order offense. Bridge was offered the choice between a trial at either Crown or Magistrates' Court for these alleged offences and opted for the former. He is also due to face two trials at Oxford Magistrates' Court in April 2027 – one in relation to six counts of using threatening words or behaviour to cause harassment, alarm or distress, scheduled for 12 April, and another trial on 21 April in relation to allegations of common assault and using threatening, abusive or insulting words or behaviour with intent to cause fear of, or provoke, unlawful violence. Bridge was also charged with common assault following his appearance at a protest in Brighton in June. He appeared in court in Brighton on 20 August and entered a plea of not guilty. Bridge appeared in court in Brighton on 5 October, when the charge against him was changed to assault by beating. He pleaded not guilty and a trial date was set for 15 March 2027.

In May, a third member of the group, Billy Allison, was charged with murder and grievous bodily harm with intent in relation to an incident at a bar in Lichfield. On 18 November, a jury found him guilty of the murder of one man and of causing grievous bodily harm with intent to another.

In July 2026, group member Ben Cullen appeared in court charged with making indecent images of children. Cullen denied the charges. The group said that Cullen "was not affiliated with Raise the Colours", though photos of him remain on the group's social media pages.

On 14 May 2026, Raise the Colours returned to Stirchley to put flags on lampposts again. Later in the evening, a group of local residents met and started to take down the flags, when men wearing Raise the Colours clothing arrived and were, in the words of the residents, "really aggressive” and “seemed like they were really wanting to fight". One local resident was hit by a van that other residents reported had a Raise the Colours logo on. The man was hospitalised with a broken leg. West Midlands Police reported that "The van failed to stop at the scene but was recovered on nearby Prince Road and is now being examined". Ryan Bridge subsequently told the BBC that Stirchley had been "hijacked" by the "far-left". He denied knowledge of the incident with the van, adding that his group does not "condone any violence". Bridge referred to the evening as "just a normal Raise the Colours flagging mission...where the public look out for us and we're looking out for them". Two days later, Bridge was arrested while arriving in London to attend a Unite the Kingdom rally, on suspicion of wounding in relation to the Stirchley hit-and-run. A second, 52-year-old man was arrested in Birmingham later the same day, also on suspicion of wounding. Both men were subsequently released on bail. On 16 November, West Midlands Police announced that Mark Keating had been charged with four counts of assault by beating in relation to the Stirchley incident and is due to appear before Birmingham Magistrates Court on 9 December. Ryan Bridge has been charged with two counts of using threatening or abusive words or behaviour likely to cause harassment, alarm or distress, and will appear before magistrates on 10 December. The following day, it was announced that Julian Keane had been charged with causing serious injury by dangerous driving and had been bailed to appear at Birmingham Magistrates Court on 16 December.

=== Councils ===
==== Costs ====
Local councils choosing to remove flags and repaint roundabouts have incurred costs. A freedom of information request sent to 383 local councils revealed that £61,770 had been spent by 36 local authorities. Total countrywide cost could be higher, as the data shows 583 incidents of flag removals across 276 areas but just 36 councils recorded a cost to the work, suggesting many will have absorbed the costs into their budgets. The request showed that Yorkshire councils had spent more than £30,000 removing flags.

North Somerset Council’s cabinet member for Highways told a council meeting in September that repainting road markings and taking down flags had to date cost the council £6,000, enough money to have filled 200 potholes. A Kent councillor cited more than £11,000 had been spent to remove flags in Medway.

Nottinghamshire County Council, led by Reform UK, has spent £75,000 on Union flags to be put up across the county. Initially this will be 164 flags installed on roads running from Worksop to Ruddington. Opposition parties have criticised the move, saying the money could have been spent on other council services.

===== Injunctions =====
====== Oxfordshire injunction ======
In June 2026 Oxfordshire County Council sought an injunction to prevent people from raising flags on or near public highways, having spent over £15,000 removing over 300 flags from lampposts. The High Court heard the case on 23 June, granting an injunction against the unauthorised attachment of flags on or near public highways. The council had indicated that it also wanted an additional, specific injunction against four named members of Raise the Colours – Ryan Bridge, Ben Cullen, Trudy Wells and Kevin Good – but opted not pursue this when the four agreed to stop attaching flags to lampposts in Oxfordshire and "also agreed not to encourage others to put flags up, and not to obstruct any council worker or contractor taking them down".

Bridge stated that the injunction was "horrendous" and that Oxford was "completely finished", saying "We haven't had the result we wanted today, because we want to be able to put up flags of our country wherever we like". Reform UK MP Richard Tice accused the Liberal Democrats, who control the council of hating patriotism and England. The council leader stated that "We are very explicitly not about banning people who want to fly the flag on their own private property. We fly the flag on our own council buildings and we’re very proud to do so".

Reports that were submitted to the High Court as part of the case included allegations that Ben Cullen had headbutted a highways worker; that highways workers now had to wear unbranded uniforms and drive unbranded vehicles and cover their faces for fear of being attacked; that Raise the Colours supporters had spat at streetlight maintenance workers; that Cullen and Trudy Wells had posted details of council depots online; and that the group had attached trackers to highway workers' vehicles, using them to find out their home addresses, which were then posted online.

On 22 July, the BBC reported that the Attorney General's Office was reviewing footage shared by Raise the Colours on social media, which had been filmed inside the Royal Courts of Justice, to determine whether it was in the public interest to bring contempt of court charges. The Criminal Justice Act 1925 makes it illegal to take or publish film footage within court precincts in England and Wales.

====== Birmingham injunction ======
On 26 August 2026, Birmingham City Council applied to the High Court for an injunction to prevent members of Raise the Colours named as Ryan Bridge, Elliott Stanley, Julian Keane, Ross Child, Billy Allison, Ben Cullen, Mark Keating and "persons unknown" from putting up flags, as part of its "ongoing work to manage unauthorised attachments on the highway, including flags, banners and signage". The Birmingham Mail reported that "In its submissions to the court, the council will say it had witnessed incidents that involved harassment, intimidation or obstruction during removal activity". The council has stated that it is pursuing an injunction as a "last resort" after it "sought voluntary compliance" from Raise the Colours without success.

In documents filed with the court by Birmingham City Council, it stated that its highways contractor Kier Group was "no longer willing to deploy operatives for [removing flags] due to concerns regarding health and safety" owing to threats and intimidation. The council stated that an alternative contractor was quoting £132 per flag for removals, and that it estimated that there were 20,000 flags that had been raised in the city, meaning it was facing a £2.6 million bill for their removal. The council's Director of Highways and Infrastructure stated that the council could not afford this and that it would divert resources from other, vital tasks. The manager of the council's community safety partnership stated that the council was not "taking sides" but that when opposed or questioned, Raise the Colours "respond with aggression, intimidation and, in some cases, violence....this has resulted in many people feeling unsafe in their own homes and increased tension within local communities". He confirmed that "there have been instances of Palestinian flags being flown from street infrastructure and the council is also seeking to prevent these flags, and any other attachment depicting a flag, being erected on highway furniture or infrastructure without prior authorisation". The documents also include a statement from West Midlands Police that flagging activity has "created a sustained and disproportionate demand upon [our] resources".

In a witness statement, the council's executive director of operations stated "For the avoidance of doubt, the (council) does not seek to restrict the defendants from affixing flags to their own private property...residential or commercial premises". Answering questions on a phone-in programme on BBC Radio WM, the council leader, Liberal Democrat Roger Harmer, said that the council was not banning national flags and that those people wanting to see more flags in their ward should speak to their local councillor to ask for one to be flown from council property, saying "If you have a library with a flag pole, engage with your local councillor, let's see if we can get more flags up legitimately".

After it was reported that the council was applying for an injunction, false claims circulated on social media that the council was seeking an outright ban on the flying of national flags. A council spokesperson told Reuters "We are not stopping people flying flags on their property".

After several hearings in the High Court in Birmingham, the judge issued her written decision on 18 November, granting Birmingham City Council an interim prohibitory injunction banning Ryan Bridge, Ben Cullen and "persons unknown" from attaching flags to public infrastructure without permission and granting power of arrest should Bridge or "persons unknown" break the order. Keating, Keane, Stanley and Childs all gave legal undertakings to the court that they would take no further part in further unauthorised flagging and these undertakings were accepted by the council. Both Allison (who was found guilty of murder on the same day as the temporary injuction was granted) and Cullen opted not to take in the court proceedings.

Upon issuing her judgment, the judge noted the "very emotive language" that had surrounded the case and stated: "The interim injunction needs to be understood for what it is. It is not the Court nor the (council) ‘banning the Union Jack’ or the display of Pride flags or anything of the like. Whilst the interim injunction order will cover flags of all types, it is limited in scope to the restraint of unauthorised flags attached to highway street furniture or infrastructure, and to the restraint of associated conduct, within the administrative area of Birmingham. There are many different ways in which flags of all types can still be displayed in Birmingham."

== Vandalism ==
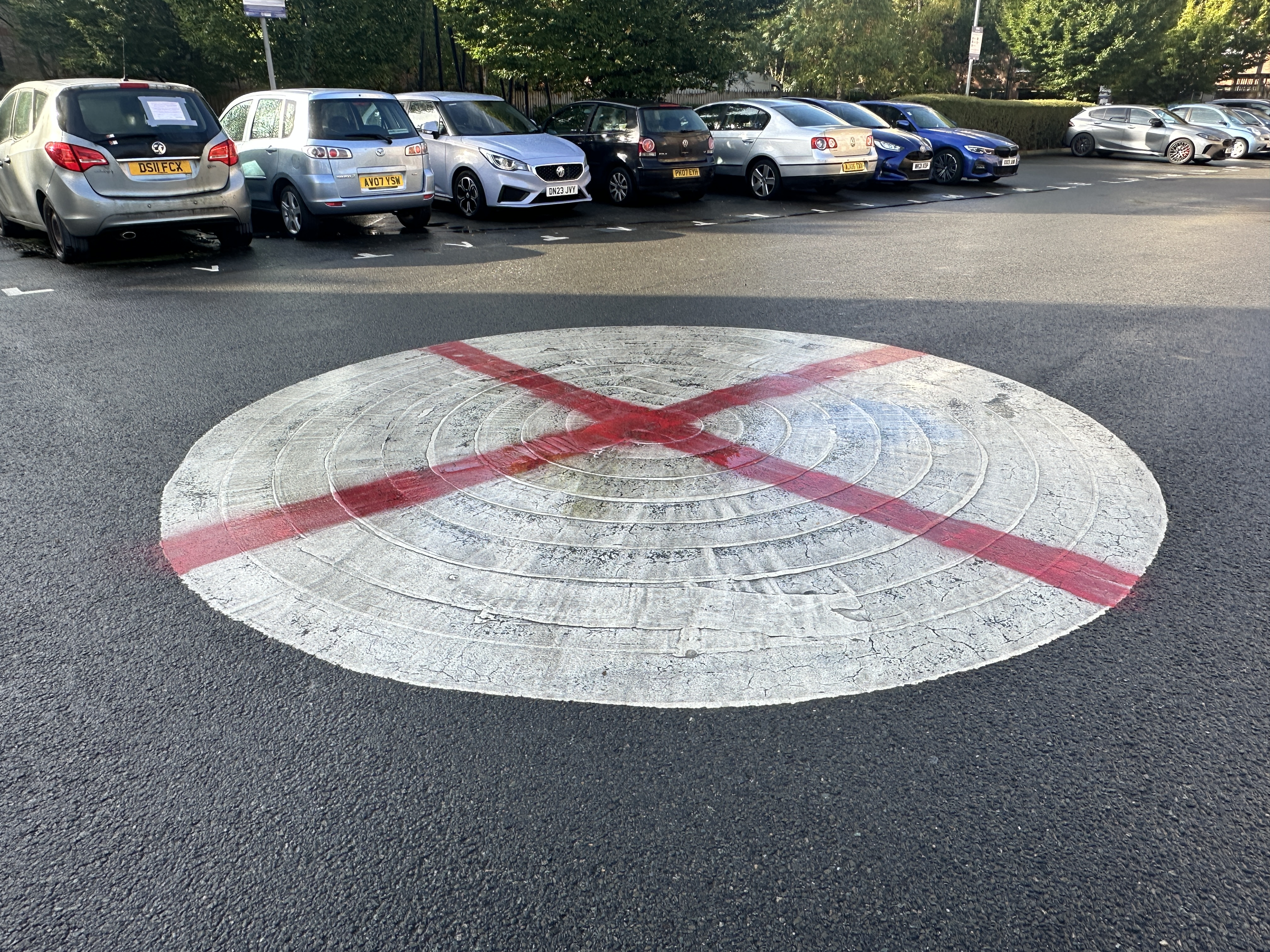
Vandalism on a roundabout in Borehamwood, Hertfordshire

In Wales, the flag of England was painted on a mini-roundabout in Llandudno, and in Henllys and Cwmbran local people turned out to scrub graffiti from signs and bus stops. A month after the mini-roundabout in Llandudno was painted, the same roundabout was repainted with a Welsh flag and an anti-English slogan, prompting a police investigation.

War memorials in Bodmin in Cornwall and Kilburn in Derbyshire had the England flag painted on them, as well as the Portsmouth Guildhall.

Toilets on Ilfracombe seafront were marked with red graffiti in a Saint George's Cross style. Roads in Leicestershire were painted with "offensive graffiti". A 33-year-old man was arrested in August 2025 after vandalism of shops in Basildon. In November 2025, a zebra crossing in Audley, Staffordshire was spray painted with St George's crosses for a second time, having previously been painted in August. A council cabinet member "said it would have to be removed at the expense of the taxpayer, when time and resources allowed".

On 4 October a mosque in Peacehaven was set alight by masked arsonists. Speaking to BBC News about the attack, the Brighton and Hove branch of Stand Up to Racism said it had occurred within the context of Raise The Colours and other vandalism locally, "for a number of weeks now, racist and fascist groups... have been whipping up an atmosphere of hatred and intimidation against black and Asian people across the South Sussex coast with flags, stickers and racist graffiti".

Local businesses in Stirchley, Birmingham, have reported experiencing intimidation from Raise the Colours. Two businesses whose owners and customers had opposed flags being raised nearby subsequently had their premises vandalised with flour and eggs. Raise the Colours posted on X about a third small business that objected to the flags, with their post being shared by Tommy Robinson and the business subsequently targeted by hundreds of negative reviews on Google.

== Response ==
In August 2025, several political figures and groups, including Kemi Badenoch's Conservative Party, Nigel Farage's Reform UK and Keir Starmer's Labour Party, welcomed and defended the flying of flags amid the campaign. Badenoch said it was "shameful" of councils to remove the flags.

According to vexillologist Malcom Farrow, "the reason some associate the flag with far right groups is because Britain has never been a nation that has flown flags often and so 'nutter extremists' have been able to hijack them as their own symbols".

In a radio interview with BBC Radio 5 Live on 1 September 2025, Starmer stated: "I'm very encouraging of flags. I think they're patriotic and I think they're a great symbol of our nation." He also said: "I don't think they should be devalued and belittled. I think sometimes when they're used purely for divisive purposes, actually it devalues the flag." He later said to The Guardian that the St George's flag "represents our diverse country" and that he would not tolerate people being "intimidated on our streets because of their background or the colour of their skin".

Media and cultural studies expert Helen Wood has written that "some politicians from all parties, right and left, came out in support of the flags, announcing their own patriotism while further dividing the nation given the glaringly obvious relationship to the far-right and to racism".

In the context of suggestions that he was planning a leadership challenge to Starmer, the Health Secretary Wes Streeting was reported in February 2026 as stating at a fundraising event for MPs Neil Coyle and Rosie Wrighting, "We knew it [Operation Raise the Colours] wasn’t about national pride and patriotism. It was about saying that that flag belongs to people who look like us, and not people whose skin is different to mine and Neil’s and Rosie’s". According to the Sunday Times, Streeting "called for Labour to make a more 'progressive' case and was critical of flags being hung from lamp-posts".

The "anti-fascist officer" at Stand up to Racism stated in August 2025 said: "We are concerned that the discussion around the English flag and patriotism is giving cover for racism driven by the far right, and – shamefully – by politicians of all shades" and subsequently commented that it "was never about flags, it’s about giving confidence to racists and fascists to target refugees and migrants.”

The Wythall Flaggers said: "This is not racist never has been never will be" and stated that they "have members of the community of all ethnicities and religions stopping by and praising what we are doing so please don't call this racist".

The chief executives and leaders of several NHS trusts have reported that some staff feel intimidated by flags flying from lampposts, including when they are making home visits. One, speaking anonymously, said in November 2025 that "It felt like the flags were up creating no-go zones. That's what it felt like to them".

In February 2026, seven Church of England bishops, including the Bishop of Kirkstall Arun Arora, the Bishop of Leicester Martyn Snow and the Bishop of Birmingham Michael Volland, issued a statement calling for the England flag to be a "symbol of unity" and criticising those "seeking to sow division and misunderstanding" by using it a symbol of anti-migrant sentiment.

The campaign has been compared to the sectarianism of Northern Ireland, where different, hostile groups paint murals and raise flags to mark their territory.

== Public opinion ==
Writing in the Financial Times in May 2026, Stephen Bush called Operation Raise the Colours "a flag campaign that a majority of Britons of all races view as one motivated by overt hostility to ethnic diversity in the UK". According to a YouGov opinion poll conducted between 3 and 16 October 2025, "Both white and ethnic minority adults tend to see this summer’s lamppost flag raisings as primarily about spreading an anti-migrant or anti-ethnic minority message, rather than a display of patriotism". The results also showed that "Ethnic minority adults tend to say they would be uncomfortable if large numbers of England flags were raised in their local area in such a manner".

50% of 3,248 adults surveyed by YouGov thought that those attaching England flags to lampposts were doing so mostly as a way of expressing anti-ethnic minority or anti-migrant sentiment, 25% thought they were doing so mostly as an expression of national pride, and 25% thought both motivations were equal. Amongst ethnic minority adults, the figures were 55%, 15% and 20% respectively. When the question was asked about the Union Flag instead, 39% (and 41% of ethnic minority respondents) saw it as an expression of anti-ethnic minority or anti-migrant sentiment, 30% (26% of ethnic minority respondents) as an expression of national pride, and 24% (23% of ethnic minority respondents) saw it as both equally. 52% of ethnic minority and 36% of white adults responded that they saw the England flag as a racist symbol, but only 26% of ethnic minority and 19% of white adults thought the same of the Union Flag.

A survey published by the Society of Radiographers in August 2026 recorded a "noticeable" increase of racist incidents experienced by its members over the previous 18 months, with healthcare workers citing Operation Raise the Colours as one of the factors contributing to more hostile attitudes towards foreign-born and ethnic minority staff.

== Associated vigilantism ==
In November and December 2025, members of the Raise the Colours group made multiple trips to France to engage in vigilante action against migrants. They were joined on some of these trips by Tommy Robinson associate Danny "Tommo" Thomas and on one by former football hooligan Jason Marriner. In January 2026, the French interior ministry announced that it had banned 10 British nationals associated with the movement from entering or residing in France.

== In other countries ==
In August 2025, Irish flags started to be attached to lampposts in Dublin by anti-migrant groups, particularly in suburbs where accommodation for refugees and asylum seekers is located. According to The Journal, the "trend of hanging flags on lampposts is a direct copy of the same trend in England, and like in the UK, is part of a wider use of the flag as a symbol in the context of protests against immigration".

A very similar movement arose in the Netherlands shortly after it did so in Britain. Named 'Operatie Hijs de Vlag' (which translates to 'Operation Hoist the Flag'), the movement was sparked by similar nationalistic and anti-immigration individuals, although it also occurred shortly before the Dutch general election on 29 October 2025. Sales of the Dutch national flag boomed during this period of time. Some flags had been removed by local councils, although these were noted to be within the strict Dutch laws regarding public buildings and infrastructure, and those placed within private property remained untouched. The national flag, along with the controversial (albeit not illegal) Prince's Flag, had been flown at protests by demonstrators in October who yelled racist and anti-semetic remarks. The D66 party leader Rob Jetten said that the national flag has been "claimed" by the far-right. Jetten made the national flag central to his election campaign in an effort to "reclaim" the flag; he led his party to victory at the elections.

== See also ==
- Kerb painting
- Murals in Northern Ireland
