= Kevin Bentley (politician) =

British politician (born 1964)

Kevin Paul Bentley (born April 1964) is a British conservative politician.

== Career ==
Bentley initially worked with the BBC as a radio and television reporter.

He was a member of Essex County Council between 2009 and 2026. In 2011 he was appointed to the Cabinet, and appointed Deputy Leader in 2013. In 2021, he was elected Leader of the Council.

He was not re-elected at the elections held on 7 May 2026.

He also serves as a Colchester City Councillor, and has previously been leader of the Conservatives in the city.
