= White demographic decline =

Population decrease of Whites proportionate to the total population

White demographic decline is an agenda-setting contention that some places and societies are undergoing a decrease in their white populace either numerically or as a percentage of the total population. It has been described as occurring in the United States, Canada, Latin America, the United Kingdom, Australia, New Zealand, South Africa, Spain, Italy, France, and Zimbabwe according to the interpretations of data gathered in national censuses and other means of tracking racial categorizations.

Some scholars have discussed the factors and anticipated results of white demographic decline in various societies where white people are either in the majority or the dominant minority. In some situations where white demographic decline is argued to take place, some formerly white majority areas have become majority minority, a situation similar to ethnic enclaves where a minority group of a larger area or society is locally the majority group due to phenomena such as immigration or demographic transitions.

In recent decades, white demographic decline has become a political touchstone for far-right political groups, inspiring conspiracy theories and terrorist violence. The politicization of white demographic decline has also manifested as anti-abortion, anti-immigrant and natalist sentiment. Academic evidence indicates that immigration significantly contributes to the maintenance of economies, civic institutions, and population levels in places affected by white demographic decline, such as in the Southern United States.

== Overview ==
In some countries which conduct a national census and include a white racial or ethnic category, certain experts and scholars in various fields of study have reported a decline in white population either as a proportion of the total population or, in other cases, in terms of raw numbers. Some of those who have studied this have included anthropologists Leo Chavez, Arizona State University's Luis Plascencia, Rich Benjamin, and University of Louisville's Steven Gardiner; demographers William H. Frey, Eric Kaufmann, Rogelio Sáenz, Dudley L. Poston Jr., Ann Morning, and David Coleman; social geographers like Loughborough University's Marco Antonsich and Syracuse University's Jamie Winders; political scientists Elliot Jager and Robert Pape; and historians Trevor Burnard, and Mark Sedgwick. Various national demographic analyses reported a decline in some white populations, as defined by their local nation-based censuses. Research conducted at the University of Minnesota identified such occurrences in Europe, North America and Oceania:

According to the most recent U.S. census, the non-Hispanic White population is shrinking (US Census Bureau, 2018). This trend has been observed in other White-majority countries including Canada (Statistics Canada, 2017), the UK (Coleman, 2016), and New Zealand (Stats New Zealand, 2004).

Regarding the 2020 US census, demographer William H. Frey wrote:

The Census Bureau was not projecting white population losses to occur until after 2024. This makes any national population growth even more reliant on other race and ethnic groups. The white demographic decline is largely attributable to its older age structure when compared to other race and ethnic groups. This leads to fewer births and more deaths relative to its population size.

Sociologist Richard Alba and demographer Dowell Myers have stated that this decline is divisive and exaggerated somewhat by the census format. Nonetheless, many academics, such as Nicholas Lemann, suggest the decline will affect national election results in the US. Demographer Eric Kaufmann argued that "[i]n an era of unprecedented white demographic decline it is absolutely vital for it to have a democratic outlet.... [P]oliticians should set [immigration] levels that respect the cultural comfort zone of the median voter."

== Associated terminology ==
=== Majority minority ===
Referencing ethno-cultural, linguistic, and religious demography, the term 'majority minority' has been used in racial contexts in media and academia, and specifically to identify the demographic decline of white populations. In 2010, it was reported by the BBC how "America's two largest states – California and Texas – became 'majority-minority' states (with an overall minority population outnumbering the white majority)" between 1998 and 2004.

Demographers Rogelio Sáenz and Dudley L. Poston Jr. have studied states in which white people have become less than 50% of the population in the 21st century, and how, more US states are predicted to follow the trend: "nonwhites account for more than half of the populations of Hawaii, the District of Columbia, California, New Mexico, Texas and Nevada. In the next 10 to 15 years, these half-dozen 'majority-minority' states will likely be joined by as many as eight other states where whites now make up less than 60 percent of the population." From their research, Sáenz and Poston Jr expect the United States to have progressed to overall white minority demography by 2044. Regarding various projected majority minority scenarios across the Western world, in a 2018 article for the London School of Economics, academics Eric Kaufmann and Matthew Goodwin wrote:

The ethnic make-up of many western countries is changing, and in countries previously seen as having 'white' majorities that past predominance is declining. In the United States, Canada and New Zealand, the 'majority-minority' point will arrive around 2050, while in western Europe it is projected to occur towards the end of the century. Some commentators have asked if this change may lead to a growing reaction or 'white backlash'. All else being equal, we suggest that the answer may be yes.

An example from the developing world includes Brazil which, due to a long-term demographic decline of white Brazilians, has been designated as a majority-minority country in relation to the South American nation's racial classification of whiteness.

=== Racial shift condition ===
In their widely cited research, professors Jennifer Richeson and Maureen Craig produced a 2014 study on white racial shift conditions. White people who were informed of their diminishing demographic share of the population displayed more racial hostility to perceived external racial groups. Pacific Standard described the research as how "the coming racial shift evokes higher levels of both explicit and implicit racism on the part of white Americans". In analysis of the study, sociologist Mary C. Waters concurred that the portrayal in media of falling white demography was linked with subsequent discrimination against non-whites.

=== Whiteshift ===
Demographer Eric Kaufmann's theory of whiteshift predicts that as white demographic decline gradually results in white majorities becoming minorities (sometimes called a majority minority scenario) that a broader and more inclusive classification of white people will occur. A professor of politics at Birkbeck College, he suggests that, given the appropriate societal conditions, both conservatives and cosmopolitans may be able to observe whiteshift as a positive factor. In this regard, political analyst Michael Barone believes there may be "cautious optimism" that the social phenomenon can progress in a politically stable form.

Analysing Kaufmann's thesis, historian Michael Burleigh has used examples of whiteshift such as Western right-wing nativist politicians Iain Duncan Smith, Geert Wilders, and Ted Cruz, who have some degree of what might be considered non-white or ethnic minority ancestry in their respective countries. Demographer Dowell Myers has also referenced Cruz and Megan Markle as examples, observing that "whites are indeed in numerical decline" in the United States, when judged upon a criterion of exclusively European ancestry.

== Demography by regions ==
=== Europe ===
==== United Kingdom ====
White British proportion of the population from 2001 to 2011

In 2013, Demos published research analyzing the 2011 United Kingdom census. The UK-based think tank detailed how "departing White British are replaced by immigration or by the natural growth of the minority population. Over time, the end result of this process is a spiral of White British demographic decline".

Demographer David Coleman has produced studies which predict that the cities of Leicester and Birmingham will join London in their majority minority status during the 2020s, with regard to the demographic decline of white people in Britain. Coleman estimates that by 2056 the trend of a declining share of the white populace will result in the United Kingdom having an overall white minority.

=== North America ===
==== Canada ====
In 2017, John Ibbitson, Canadian writer and columnist for The Globe and Mail, argued that as the population becomes more evenly split between white Canadians and visible minorities, it could lead to heightened political polarization and social challenges. He suggested that Canada will need to navigate these changes carefully to ensure social cohesion and address the concerns of a diverse population.

Writing in 2019, journalist Margaret Wente has suggested that "nations upended by right-wing populism all have one thing in common. They are all facing white demographic decline. And that is the breeding ground for populist revolts." Wente argues that with significant projected decline of the white share of the population in Canada, the country will have to address reactionary populist politics.

==== United States ====
White Americans of one race (or alone) from 1960 to 2020. Some changes may be due to changing self-identification patterns rather than demographic changes.

While non-Hispanic white Americans under 18 in the U.S. are already a minority as of 2020, it is projected that non-Hispanic whites overall will become a minority within the US by 2045.

== Political impact ==
The political right has been reported to be most inclined to reference white demographic decline in a political context, with 2022 communication-research outlining how fears of white-related demography are often weaponised. Max Hui Bai, a scholar working within Stanford University's Polarization and Social Change Lab, has explored "how people react to the numerical decline of white populations" across the Western world.

Sociologist and demographer Ann Morning has suggested that representations of female multiraciality have been used in media to show evidence of "racial progress" and "bridging racial divides", while also providing a function which "serves to soften the blow of White demographic decline". Professor Trevor Burnard has discussed how "white demographic decline" occurred in the population of the colony of Jamaica between 1655 and 1780, stating that his research "presents hard data on white mortality in seventeenth- and eighteenth-century Jamaica" and its political implications. In modern times, journalist Sabrina Tavernise has reported that since the 2020 US Census, regarding white demography, social scientists have pointed out that the "declining share of white people as a part of the population has become a part of American politics – as a worry on the right and a cause for optimism on the left."

=== Africa ===
==== South Africa ====
Scholars Hermann Giliomee and Lawrence Schlemmer have credited, among other factors, international pressure on the apartheid government and "a white demographic decline" for facilitating the process of negotiations to end apartheid in South Africa.

=== Europe ===
Adela Fofiu of Babeș-Bolyai University has noted how right-wing organizations and outlets in Romania politicize white demographic decline, attempting to associate it with concepts such as the "Islamization of Europe" or "Gypsification" of the country, the latter of which refers to the Romani people in Romania. In 2018 analysis, the Southern Poverty Law Center explored how right-wing extremism in Europe attempts to utilize the continents demographic decline and the rise of immigration from Arab and or Middle Eastern countries for political gain. A professor at Loughborough University, Marco Antonsich's research in Italy suggests that "demographic change and the decline of white majorities" provides space for immigrant communities to" justify their national belonging and to rewrite the nation".

==== United Kingdom ====
In 2018, Eric Kaufmann wrote a piece for the New Statesman on the demographic decline of white British people within the United Kingdom, stating that "Three-quarters of people in Britain in 2150 will, like myself, be mixed-race" and highlighted political consequences of such a transformation taking place:

When whites can't express their sense of ethnic loss, they turn to the seemingly more "respectable" alternatives of demonising Muslims, criticising immigrants who live in minority neighbourhoods, or voting for Brexit (a result of diverting concerns over ethnic change into hatred of the acceptably "white" EU). Few things have contributed more to today's populist blowback than the demographic blind spot in Western political thought.

In 2020, Nick Timothy, a former Downing Street Chief of Staff, addressed societal consequences of the ongoing demographic decline of white people in the United Kingdom:

This is a difficult issue to understand and address, but the anxiety is real. White people are as attached to their ethnic and cultural identity as any other group and, faced with the reality of rapid demographic decline, many feel a sense of loss.

=== North America ===
==== Canada ====
Writing in 2019, journalist Margaret Wente has suggested that "nations upended by right-wing populism all have one thing in common. They are all facing white demographic decline. And that is the breeding ground for populist revolts." Wente argues that with significant projected decline of the white share of the population in Canada, the country will have to address reactionary populist politics.

Right-wing populist parties, such as the People's Party of Canada (PPC), have particularly benefited from the increase in anti-immigrant sentiment, with the PPC gaining nearly 800,000 votes in the 2021 Canadian federal election.

==== United States ====
In 1998 research, Fordham University professor Tanya K. Hernandez outlined the potential for multiracial Americans to have their representative US census category "co-opted by the larger society as a mechanism for constructing a buffer class to maintain White privilege, in the midst of a growing concern with the demographic decline of White U.S. residents". Samuel P. Huntington's 2004 book Who Are We? The Challenges to America's National Identity addressed the emerging population change in the United States. In an analysis on Huntington's treatise, political demographer Eric Kaufmann wrote:

Finally, Huntington considers the possibility of a white nationalist response to the changes taking place. He says that white nativism is a "plausible" response to white demographic decline, the cosmopolitan defection of the white elite and the fading power of the Anglo-Protestant core.

By 2010, the Southern Poverty Law Center's 1,000 organizations listed within their "hate" and "nativist" archives predominantly involved politics referencing white demography. Arizona State University anthropologist Luis Plascencia wrote that "a common thread in many of these groups is the concern with the demographic decline of 'white' individuals". In 2009, Stanford University professor Eamonn Callan observed that:

The slow but inexorable demographic decline of white Americans to the status of one minority among others has begun to register in popular consciousness, making it harder for anyone to suppose that American identity could still be white identity.

In the mid-2010s, white people's demographic decline became increasingly associated with politics in relation to the 2016 presidential election. Donald Trump's policy positions and rhetoric were seen by some scholars as giving an outlet to anxiety based upon this changing white demography. Conservative journalist Christopher Caldwell argued that perceived cultural celebration of the process had contributed to the political energies supporting candidate Trump. Caldwell wrote that "At the same time, white demographic decline has been accompanied in many quarters with official exultation. The promise is not to enrich white America with new ethnicities but to replace it." Research has predicted a rise in rhetoric regarding issues such as protectionism among white Americans, and particularly white evangelicals, in proportion with the ongoing percentage-share reduction of whites. This demographic decline has also been utilized by extremist commentators, such as explicit supporters of the "alt-right" or white supremacist movements.

In this regard, research in historian Mark Sedgwick's Key Thinkers of the Radical Right indicated that elements of the extremist right-wing believed that Trump's proposed policies, such as the Trump travel ban or the wall, would "slow white demographic decline". Similarly, Aurora University professor Faith Agostinone-Wilson's On the Question of Truth in the Era of Trump describes these types of political aspirations as "an Americanized version of salvation, where white demographic decline is halted and the country is purged of the Other". Anthropologist Rich Benjamin has suggested that the "Trump administration has aimed its rhetoric at a slice of aggrieved white Americans who are panicked about their demographic decline", while political scientist Elliot Jager has written:

Trump directs his appeal at disenfranchised working-class Americans by telling them that he'll "make America great again", intimating that he'll reverse the demographic decline of whites by "humanely" deporting 11 million mostly Hispanic, illegal aliens; will protect the homeland by banning Muslims from entering, and will build an impenetrable barrier on the Mexican border.

After the inauguration of President Trump, a March 2017 New Republic article examined Chief Strategist Steve Bannon's advocacy for the 1973 book The Camp of the Saints, which it described as "an explicitly racist novel, saturated in deep fear at the prospect of white demographic decline".

In the 2020s, study of American politics increasingly factored in the demographic reduction in analysing the Republican Party's electoral success and future strategy. For example, in analysis of the 2020 presidential election results, University of Melbourne professor Timothy J. Lynch suggests "white demographic decline need not spell disaster for the GOP. Despite his dog-whistle racism, Trump performed better than expected among Black voters." In relation to the party's future direction, UCLA's political scientist Gary Segura notes that "Republicans nationally receive 85 percent of their votes from white voters by capturing between 55 and 60 percent of their ballots in each election", adding that "with the demographic decline of white voters, even 60 percent of that cohort will be a poor start when it comprises just two-thirds of the electorate in 2024". Professor Nicholas Lemann also argues that high motivation and corresponding turnout from the Republican Party's supporter base would be required to offset the ongoing demographic decline of whites by the 2024 election.

Interviewed by Jeffrey Goldberg in 2020, the director of the documentary film White Noise proposed that the decline of whites had become the most significant driving force in the politics of the US. Daniel Lombroso stated "There is a deep-seated fear of white demographic decline in this country, and obviously in Europe. And I think that is now the defining fault line in American politics". Brittany Farr, a Sharswood Fellow at Penn Law, suggests that reporting on US Census results (regarding falling white demography) by journalistic outlets, such as the New York Times and Wall Street Journal, are communicating "a sense of inevitability with respect to white demographic decline".

===== Academic study on reactions =====
In the United States, responses to the demographic decline of white people have been studied with regard to its effect on the political ideologies of white populations, including recording individual reactions to specific issues, such as welfare, terrorism or ethnic group preference. Sociologists Bart Bonikowski and Yueran Zhang note that:

One major source of perceived racial threat is demographic change. Experimental studies have shown that when exposed to information about white demographic decline or increased racial diversity, white respondents express more negative attitudes towards other racial groups (Craig and Richeson 2014b; Enos 2014; Outten et al. 2012)

A March 2020 research article found that whites in the US were more likely to expand classification of whiteness to include white Latin Americans "when their privileged social status is threatened, for example, by the prospect of numeric decline". July 2020 research showed that white Americans who are informed of the projected minority status of whites in the United States are more likely to support the torture of terrorist suspects.

===== 2021 United States Capitol attack =====
In 2021, political scientist Robert Pape identified that of the 716 people charged or arrested for storming the Capitol Building in Washington, D.C., they had travelled predominantly "from counties where the white share of the population is declining fastest". In the aftermath of the attack, Tech Against Terrorism published evidence that white demographic decline was being used as a statistical example by the far right to radicalize Trump supporters.

== Extremism ==
=== Anti-abortion movement ===
In Katha Pollitt's 2015 book Pro, she theorizes that a lower fertility rate for white women, as compared to nonwhite women, might explain the support for the anti-abortion movement. (Note: As of the 2020 United States census, people Middle Eastern and North African descent are classified under the census as white. Some Hispanic and Latinos also identify as white.) Hampshire College professor Marlene Fried's research suggests Pollitt exposed the "underlying agenda of the antiabortion movement", including concerns about white demographic decline, conservative views, anti-feminism, and "outright misogyny".

=== Anti-immigration politics ===
University of Louisville's anthropology professor Steven Gardiner has proposed how:

The decline in white fertility, however, is only a small part of the story. The narrative of white demographic decline is being written, primarily, in the language of immigration. It is only since Congress passed the Immigration and Naturalization Act Amendments of 1965 that American racial and ethnic demographics have taken the turn sketched above (Office of Immigration Statistics 2004, 5). Passed during the Johnson Administration, during the height of the Civil Rights era, the 1965 Act repealed the most blatantly racist aspects of the Immigration Act of 1924. It abolished the national origins quotas which had, quite intentionally, limited non-white and non-European immigration to the United States.

Based on the effect of immigration on white demography, academic Jamie Winders has written how anti-immigrant sentiment is "grounded more in rhetoric than logic and often operates outside the boundaries of what actual research shows." Winders, a professor of geography at Syracuse University, notes that, for example: "In rural communities in the South, immigration often keeps smaller towns afloat, maintaining local schools, populations, and economies in the face of white demographic decline." In 2020, research from University of Guadalajara's Alejandro Canales confirmed similar findings in the southern US. Canales, an expert on migration and population, wrote:

The current case of California, Texas, Florida, Arizona, New Mexico and Nevada are a clear indication of what we are affirming. In all of these states the traditional demographic supremacy of non-Hispanic white people practically has been diluted by the influence of Mexican and Latin-American immigration.

=== Conspiracy theories ===
Scholars have studied how the demographic decline of white people, as well as how the portrayal of it within different types of media, have contributed towards adherence to racist and disproven conspiracy theories. Harvard University fellow José Pedro Zúquete has written that:

For many years in the American extreme right subculture a putative Jewish conspiracy—reified by the notion of ZOG or Zionist Occupation Government—was often invoked to explain the demographic decline of whites in America.

In 2019, scholar Monica Toft expanded on the emergence of nativist politics and conspiracy theory advocacy in relation to the demographic phenomenon, stating that "The 'why now' of white nativism is due to decades of demographic decline for white Americans combined with a serious decline in public education standards that leads to unwarranted nostalgia and openness to conspiracy theories." Academic Robert Pape has suggested that one of the conspiracy theories which weaponizes falling white population-share is the Great Replacement.

==== Terrorism ====
The Combating Terrorism Center, which is an academic institution within the United States Military Academy, has published research which recognizes anxiety regarding white demographic decline as an ongoing contributing motivation to terrorism in the Western world. An example of this was observed in the Christchurch mosque attacks in New Zealand. Mark Durie argues that the Christchurch terrorist intended to frame the demographic decline of white people as a "crisis" which would "incite conflict so that whites will be compelled to awaken, radicalise and grow strong." Durie, a linguistics and theology scholar, wrote: "We need to understand this ideology, not to give it a platform, but to learn and to equip ourselves to stand against such hatred." In August 2019, a man arrested for threatening to attack people at a Jewish community center in Ohio had been found to have appeared in a documentary speaking about white demographic decline in the United States and Europe.

== See also ==
- Anti-White racism
- Great Replacement
- Kalergi Plan
- One-drop rule
- White genocide conspiracy theory
