= National Populism: The Revolt Against Liberal Democracy =

2018 political science book

- Author: Roger Eatwell; Matt Goodwin
- Subject: National populism
- Genre: Political science
- Publisher: Pelican Books
- Publication date: 2018
- ISBN: 978-0-241-31200-1

National Populism: The Revolt Against Liberal Democracy is a 2018 book by political scientists Roger Eatwell and Matthew Goodwin, published by Pelican Books. The book attempts to explain the success of national populist movements using what the authors call a 4D model, with four variables: destruction of the national culture caused by large-scale immigration; deprivation of opportunities because of globalization and frequent disruptions and slow growth in the post-industrial economy; growing distrust amongst rural and working-class voters, who increasingly feel alienated by liberal, cosmopolitan, urban-inhabiting media and political elites; and de-alignment from traditional political-ideological allegiances, witnessed in high levels of voter volatility, or people switching party support between elections.

== Reception ==
National Populism received a positive review in The Economist. It was selected as one of the Sunday Times' books of the year. Historian Paul Jackson praised the book as "a clear, well-grounded introduction to the field" but noted that it was hampered by a "lack of critical awareness on how minorities experience national populist agendas". Sociologist Peter Jones wrote that the book raised important issues and examine salient trends, but questioned "how far their sympathetic view of national populism is guided by evidence-based reasoning, vis-a-vis distaste for liberal-left values". Jones compared the book with Eric Kaufmann's Whiteshift and also Goodwin, Kaufmann and others' contributions to the magazine Spiked, which he argued attempted "to discredit liberal 'identitarianism' and diversity politics." He felt that the book "feels like a contribution to the building of a 'contrarian' public platform." Martin Shaw's review of the book praised its inclusion of useful information and argued that the authors were correct to highlight that opponents of right-wing populism were in need of better responses to the challenge populists pose, but argued: "but it is quite clear what this book is. It is part of a project to normalise and detoxify the new right." In the International Political Science Review, Felipe Antunes de Oliveira wrote that Eatwell and Goodwin's "willingness to accept problematic elements of the national populist agenda" justified Shaw's characterization of the book. Umut Ozkirimli called the book an "addition to the academic alt-right corpus". William Davies reviewed the book for the Guardian, noting that the authors usefully provide evidence that the rise of right-wing populism has been a long-term process but criticized it for being "unstinting in its generosity to rightwing populist leaders, and unfailingly compassionate to their supporters."
