= Eric Kaufmann =

Canadian demographer and conservative writer (b. 1970)

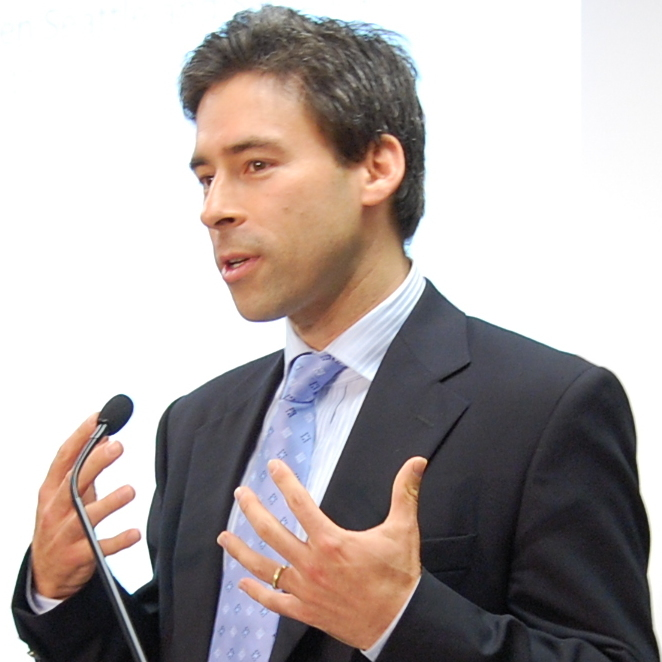
- Kaufmann speaking at a 2011 event
- Born: Eric Peter Kaufmann; 11 May 1970 (age 56); British Hong Kong
- Education: University of Western Ontario (BA); London School of Economics (MSc, PhD)
- Known for: Rise and Fall of Anglo-America (2004); Shall the Religious Inherit the Earth? (2010); Whiteshift (2018)
- Scientific career
- Fields: National identity Political demography Religious demography
- Workplaces: School of Politics and Sociology, Birkbeck College, University of London University of Buckingham (2023)
- Thesis: (1998)
- Website: sneps.net

Eric Peter Kaufmann (born 11 May 1970) is a Canadian professor of politics and conservative writer. He was appointed to the University of Buckingham in October 2023, following his resignation from his post at Birkbeck, University of London, after two decades of work, citing political differences. He is a specialist on Orangeism in Northern Ireland, nationalism, and political and religious demography. He has authored, co-authored, and edited books and other publications on these subjects.

== Early life and education ==
Eric Kaufmann was born in Hong Kong and raised in Vancouver, British Columbia, Canada, and Japan. His ancestry is half Jewish, one-quarter Chinese and one-quarter Costa Rican. His father Steve Kaufmann is of Jewish descent, the paternal grandfather a secularist hailing from Prostějov in the modern Czech Republic. His mother is a lapsed Catholic; the younger Kaufmann himself attended Catholic school for only a year. He received his BA from the University of Western Ontario in 1991. He received his MSc from the London School of Economics in 1994 where he subsequently also completed his PhD in 1998.

== Career and contributions ==
Kaufmann was lecturer in comparative politics at the University of Southampton from 1999 to 2003. He was a fellow at the Belfer Center, Kennedy School of Government, Harvard University, for the 2008–09 academic year. Kaufmann joined Birkbeck College, University of London, in 2003. He became professor of politics there in 2011. He has been an adjunct fellow of the conservatarian Manhattan Institute think tank since 2020. In 2023, Kaufmann resigned from Birkbeck College after two decades in his posts and joined the University of Buckingham in October.

=== Political demography ===
Kaufmann has argued that in the Western world, as the second demographic transition occurred during the 1960s, people began moving away from traditional, communal values towards more expressive, individualistic outlooks, owing to access to and aspiration for higher education. These changing values were also influenced by the spread of lifestyles once practiced only by a tiny minority of cultural elites. The first demographic transition resulted from falling fertility due to urbanization and decreased infant mortality rates, which diminished the benefits and increased the costs of raising children. In other words, it made more economic sense to invest more in fewer children, as economist Gary Becker argued. Although the momentous cultural changes of the 1960s leveled off by the 1990s, the social and cultural environment of the very late twentieth-century was quite different from that of the 1950s. Such changes in values have had a major effect on fertility: member states of the European Economic Community saw a steady increase in not just divorce and out-of-wedlock births between 1960 and 1985 but also falling fertility rates.

In 1981, a survey of countries across the industrialized world found that while more than half of people aged 65 and over thought that women needed children to be fulfilled, only 35% of those between the ages of 15 and 24 (younger Baby Boomers and older Generation X) agreed. As a consequence, Europe suffers from an aging population at the start of the twenty-first century. This problem is especially acute in Eastern Europe, whereas in Western Europe, it is alleviated by international immigration. In addition, an increasing number of children born in Europe have been born to non-European parents. Because children of immigrants in Europe tend to be about as religious as they are, this could slow the decline of religion (or the growth of secularism) in the continent as the twenty-first century progresses. In the United Kingdom, the number of foreign-born residents stood at 6% of the population in 1991. Immigration subsequently surged and has not fallen since (as of 2018). Research by Kaufmann and political scientists Roger Eatwell and Matthew Goodwin suggests that such a fast-paced ethno-demographic change is one of the key reasons behind the public backlash which has manifested itself in the form of national populism across rich liberal democracies, an example of which is the 2016 United Kingdom European Union membership referendum, which led to a UK majority vote to leave the European Union.

=== Religious demography ===
Much of Kaufmann's research concerns the growth of religion around the world. Factors that determine how many children a woman has in her lifetime—that is, her completed or total fertility rate—include her educational attainment, her income, and how religious she is. For example, in the cities of the Middle East, women who supported Sharia law had 50% higher fertility than those who opposed it the most at the turn of the century. According to the World Religious Database, the proportion of the human population identifying with a religion increased from 81% in 1970 to 85% in 2000 and is predicted to rise to 87% in 2025. In addition, the Catholic Church has gained 12% additional followers between 2000 and 2010, mainly from Asia and Africa. In 2018, Muslims had a median age of 23, Hindus 26, Christians 30, Buddhists and the religiously unaffiliated 34, and Jews 36. For comparison, the median age of the global population was 28 in 2018. Overall, Christians have a fertility rate of 2.6, and Muslims 2.9. Islam is the world's fastest growing religion. Meanwhile, the expansion of secularism will slow in Europe as the twenty-first century progresses.

For Kaufmann, religion can grow even in otherwise secular societies. For example, in Israel, the ultra-Orthodox Jews comprised just about five percent of the nation's primary schoolchildren in 1960, but by the start of the twenty-first century, one third of Jewish first graders in Israel came from this religious sect. Ultra-Orthodox Jewish women in Israel had on average 7.5 children compared to their more mainstream counterparts with just over two in the early 2000s. In Europe, immigration from the Middle East and Africa is an engine of religious growth. Children of immigrants tend to be about as religious as their parents and consider their religion to be a marker of their ethnic identity, thereby insulating themselves from the secularizing forces of the host society. The other engine is comparatively high fertility and religious endogamy. In France, a white Catholic woman had half a child more than her secular counterparts in the early 2000s; in Spain, that number was 0.77. In the Netherlands, the youngest villages belong to Orthodox Calvinists, who comprised 7% of the Dutch population by the early 2000s. In Finland, the Laestadian Lutherans maintained a significant fertility advantage over the average Finn during the mid- to late-1980s, 5.47 compared to 1.45, despite seeing declines during the course of the twentieth century. In Austria, the number of people below the age of 15 who were Muslims rose past the 10%-mark in the first decade of the twenty-first century. In the United Kingdom, over 90% of Muslims married other Muslims by the turn of the millennium, and it is well known that children born into an interfaith marriage tend to be less religious than their parents. Interfaith marriage is in fact a vehicle of secularization. In general, European religious groups arranged in order of decreasing fertility are Muslims, practicing Christians, non-observant Christians, and the secular. In the early 2000s, European Muslims typically have two to three times more children than whites, when looking at recent immigrants from high-fertility countries. However, the Christian-Muslim fertility gap is shrinking. Ultra-Orthodox Jews comprised just 12% of the British Jewish population but three quarters of Jewish births at the start of the twenty-first century. Kaufmann projected that this group would make up the majority of Anglo-American Jews by 2050.

Similarly, he predicted that Catholicism will become the largest religion in the United States by 2040 despite considerable losses to secularization and conversion to Protestantism, due to Latino Catholics having a fertility rate of 2.83, compared to the national average of 2.03 in 2003. Kaufmann reported that in the United States, religious conservatism and participation play a key role in raising the relative level of fertility. Thus the more conservative of sects, such as the Mormons and conservative Protestant denominations, enjoy a total fertility advantage of at least one child over the rest of Americans. In particular, Mormons with higher levels of wealth and education tend to have more children than those who were poorer. Meanwhile, secular Americans tend to have the fewest children, 1.66 per couple on average in the 2000s, lower than any other group except Buddhists and Jews. He argued that such religious demographic changes will bring about social and political ramifications later in the century.

Kaufmann noted that as the overall fertility rate of a given society continues to decline due to the second demographic transition, the fertility advantage enjoyed by the religious, especially the most devout of factions, grows. A total fertility ratio of five to four is only a 25% advantage, whereas a ratio of three to two is a 50% advantage. He cited the Mormons in the United States as an example of a group that maintained a one-child fertility premium over the rest of society, despite seeing some declines of their own. He has argued that once a critical mass is reached, a religious group will start influencing the overall demographic trend of its society.

== Political engagement ==
Kaufmann identifies as a liberal national conservative. He has called "woke" ideas "a battle for the foundations of our civilisation" and has expressed support for Florida governor Ron DeSantis, arguing at the 2022 British Conservative Party conference that the party should follow DeSantis's lead. For Kaufmann, although some of his educational policies "go too far", "DeSantis is the future of conservatism".

== Books ==
=== Rise and Fall of Anglo-America (2004) ===
- Rise and Fall of Anglo-America. Cambridge: Harvard University Press. 2004. ISBN 978-0674013032.

Here, Kaufmann offers his views on how the Anglo-Protestants, the founding stock and once dominant ethnocultural group of the United States of America, lost its status of dominance. He rejects the conventional view that this is due primarily to comparatively low fertility rates, large-scale international migration, and the growth in cultural prominence of ethnically diverse newcomers. Nor have the Anglo-Protestants maintained their dominant status by incorporating other groups of European descent into their midst, Kaufmann argues. Rather, the fall of Anglo-America is a consequence of the characteristics that have come to define this group, namely expressive individualism and egalitarianism, which are antithetical to maintaining dominance.

Historically, the early Anglo-Protestant settlers in the seventeenth century were the most successful, creating numerous surviving written records and political institutions that last till this day. For this reason, they became the dominant group, culturally, economically, and politically, and they maintained their dominance till the early twentieth century. Commitment to the ideals of the Enlightenment meant that they sought to assimilate newcomers from outside of the British Isles, but few were interested in adopting a pan-European identity for the nation, much less turning it into a global melting pot. But in the early 1900s, liberal progressives and modernists began promoting more inclusive ideals for what the national identity of the United States should be. While the more traditionalist segments of society continued to maintain their Anglo-Protestant ethnocultural traditions, universalism and cosmopolitanism started gaining favor among the elites. These ideals became institutionalized after the Second World War, and ethnic minorities started to gain rough institutional parity with the once dominant Anglo-Protestants.

=== Shall the Religious Inherit the Earth? (2010) ===
- Shall the Religious Inherit the Earth? Demography and Politics in the Twenty-First Century. Profile, 2010. ISBN 978-1846681448

In this 2010 book, Kaufmann argued that the answer to the question raised in the title is in the affirmative because demographic realities pose real challenges to the assumption of the inevitability of secular and liberal progress. He observed that devout factions tend to have a significant fertility advantage over their more moderate counterparts and the non-religious. For instance, white Catholic women in France have on average half a child more than their white secular counterparts while the Amish in the United States have three to four times more children than their fellow Christians on average. Highly religious groups tend to isolate themselves from the secularizing effects of modern mainstream Western society, making it more likely that the children will retain their parents' faiths. At the same time, secular people generally have rather low fertility rates by comparison for a variety of reasons, such as materialism, individualism, the preference for the here and now, feminism, environmentalism, or general pessimism. Kaufmann projected that secularism will have a mixed future in Europe. It will remain strong in most Catholic countries, notably Ireland and Spain, but has essentially ground to a halt in Protestant Europe and in France, and will falter in Northwestern Europe by mid-century. He told Mercator Net that the only way to buckle the trend involves "a creed that touches the emotional registers", which "can lure away the children of fundamentalists" and "a repudiation of multiculturalism." He suggested that "secular nationalism" and moderate religion associated with the nation-state could be part of the mix, but these traditions have been losing support at a considerable rate.

He observed that moderate faith of the Abrahamic variety is under pressure from both secularists and fundamentalists as they find themselves living in the secularizing societies of the West. If it were only true that the religious were having more children than secular people, Kaufmann argues that the effects of the incoming demographic transformation would only be national, but because those who are having the most children tend to be intensely religious, he predicted that there would also be ramifications for international relations. However, Kaufmann rejected the increasingly popular notion that Islam will become the dominant religion in Europe by the end of the twenty-first century; rather, he suggests that Muslims will stabilize at around a fifth of the European population by 2100.

=== Whiteshift (2018) ===
- Whiteshift: Populism, Immigration and the Future of White Majorities. Harry N. Abrams, 2018. ISBN 978-1468316971

In the late twentieth and early twenty-first century, Kaufmann argues that, unlike Japan, the nations in Western Europe, North America, and Oceania did not experience a population decline despite having mostly sub-replacement fertility. This was due to a combination of extended longevity and international migration, and the latter comes with its own political risks. Eric Kaufmann's Whiteshift is an extensive study of how the migration-driven demographic transformation of the West affects the ballot box. The title of the 2018 book encodes Kaufmann's predictions that, as a result of international migration, Western countries will become ever more ethnically diverse and a growing number of people will be of mixed heritage. He further argues that the category of 'white people' will be enlarged to include more ethnically diverse individuals. For Kaufmann, one of the major schisms in the political landscape of the West at the time of writing is due to factions that want to speed up this process and those who want to slow it down. He suggested that the surge of nationalism and populism observed in many Western countries is due to the latter group. For decades, the norms of acceptable political demands had been established by the media, institutions of higher education, and mainstream political groups. Such norms include what he called "left modernism," a more precise term for what is commonly referred to as political correctness, and "asymmetrical multiculturalism," or the idea that all cultures present in a given society deserve to be preserved except the host culture. These norms have prevented mainstream politicians and political parties from responding to the concerns of large swathes of the voting population, giving nationalist populists an opportunity to rise to the front. Despite an emphasis on white reaction to demographic change and mass migration, Kaufmann gave Proposition 187, a 1994 California ballot initiative aimed at preventing taxpayers' money from going to illegal aliens, as an example of opposition from non-whites. Proposition 187 received support from a majority of Asians and blacks and a third of Hispanics.

On release, The Times made Whiteshift the 'Book of the Week' but with a sceptical review by David Aaronovitch, who called it "a big controversial book about a big controversial subject". Publishers Weekly said it was "likely to make a big splash", and The Financial Times listed it as one of the 'Best books of 2018' in the politics genre. The New Yorker wrote that Kaufmann's Whiteshift was defending white identity politics. Daniel Trilling, in the London Review of Books, was critical of the book, describing Kaufmann's frame of reference as "both too broad and too narrow".

Kenan Malik wrote that "Whiteshift is a hefty work crammed with data and graphs. The trouble with viewing the world primarily in demographic terms, though, is that, for all the facts and figures, it is easy to be blind to the social context."

In a review symposium about Whiteshift published in the journal Ethnicities, political scientist Robert Ford wrote that "There is much to admire here. Kaufmann is methodologically catholic and draws on a rich range of different resources to examine and interrogate evolving white identity politics." However, he also noted "Kaufmann’s rather Manichean account of white ethnic politics involves some curious omissions and misunderstandings" and that "lack of balance is a recurring feature of Kaufmann’s discussions about the competing claims of ethno-cultural whites, cosmopolitan whites and ethnic minorities." Sociologist John Holmwood argued that the lack of any discussion of "settler colonialism or of the place of first Nation populations and enslavement of African Americans and Jim Crow segregation in the USA" represent "serious – in fact, fatal – omissions in a book concerned to rehabilitate symbols of white identity." Holmwood writes that "It is a very large book – 619 pages – but it is also poorly edited, repetitive and, I have suggested, partial."

== Other selected publications ==
=== Authored ===
- The Orange Order: A Contemporary Northern Irish History. Oxford University Press, Oxford, 2007. ISBN 978-0199208487
- Unionism and Orangeism in Northern Ireland Since 1945: The Decline of the Loyal Family with Henry Patterson. Manchester University Press, Manchester, 2007. ISBN 978-0719074967
- The Third Awokening. Bombardier Books, 2024. ISBN 979-8888456354

=== Co-authored and edited ===
- Rethinking Ethnicity: Majority Groups and Dominant Minorities. Routledge, 2004. ISBN 978-0415315425
- Political Demography: How Population Changes Are Reshaping International Security and National Politics with Jack Goldstone and Monica Duffy Toft. Oxford University Press, 2012. ISBN 978-0199949229
- Whither the Child: Causes and Consequences of Low Fertility with W. Bradford Wilcox. Paradigm, 2012. ISBN 978-1612050935
- Nationalism and Conflict Management with Robert Schertzer and Eric Taylor Woods. Routledge, 2012. ISBN 978-0415520454

== See also ==
- Majority-minority
- Monica Toft
