= Cumulative extremism =

Political ideology

Cumulative extremism is a form of political extremism that occurs when one form of political extremism mobilises against another form of political extremism. The term was coined by British scholar Roger Eatwell who defines cumulative extremism as "the way in which one form of extremism can feed off and magnify other forms". Dr Mohammed Ilyas defines cumulative extremism as "a process through which different forms of ‘extremism’ interact and can potentially produce a spiral of violence". The academic Matthew Goodwin gives the example of far-right political organisations mobilising in response to the perceived threat of Islamic extremism.

== See also ==
- Creeping normality
- Cycle of violence
- Slippery slope
- Violence begets violence
- Virtuous circle and vicious circle
