= Whiteshift =

2018 book by Eric Kaufmann

Whiteshift: Populism, Immigration and the Future of White Majorities
- First edition
- Author: Eric Kaufmann
- Language: English
- Subject: Whiteshift, white identity politics
- Published: 2018
- Publisher: Allen Lane
- Publication place: United Kingdom
- Media type: Print, e-book
- Pages: 624 pp
- ISBN: 978-1-46831-697-1 (hardcover)

Whiteshift: Populism, Immigration and the Future of White Majorities is a 2018 non-fiction book written by Eric Kaufmann, a professor at Birkbeck College, University of London. Described by The Economist as a "monumental study of ethno-demographic change", Whiteshift covers politics in both Europe and North America and looks into the political views of the populist right. Kaufmann argues that the rise of Donald Trump in America and the populist right in Europe is a reaction to sweeping demographic change rather than to "economic anxiety".

== Reviews ==
On release, The Times made Whiteshift the 'Book of the Week' but with a sceptical review by David Aaronovitch, who called it "a big controversial book about a big controversial subject". Publishers Weekly said it was "likely to make a big splash", and The Financial Times listed it as one of the 'Best books of 2018' in the politics genre. The New Yorker wrote that Kaufmann and Whiteshift were defending white identity politics. Daniel Trilling, in the London Review of Books, was critical of the book, describing Kaufmann's frame of reference as "both too broad and too narrow".

Kenan Malik wrote that "Whiteshift is a hefty work crammed with data and graphs. The trouble with viewing the world primarily in demographic terms, though, is that, for all the facts and figures, it is easy to be blind to the social context."

Political scientist George Michael wrote that Whiteshift was "sure to be one of the most important studies on nationalism of the 21st century". In a review symposium about Whiteshift published in the journal Ethnicities, political scientist Robert Ford wrote that "There is much to admire here. Kaufmann is methodologically catholic and draws on a rich range of different resources to examine and interrogate evolving white identity politics." However, he also noted "Kaufmann’s rather Manichean account of white ethnic politics involves some curious omissions and misunderstandings" and that "lack of balance is a recurring feature of Kaufmann’s discussions about the competing claims of ethno-cultural whites, cosmopolitan whites and ethnic minorities." Sociologist John Holmwood argued that the lack of any discussion of "settler colonialism or of the place of first Nation populations and enslavement of African Americans and Jim Crow segregation in the USA" represent "serious – in fact, fatal – omissions in a book concerned to rehabilitate symbols of white identity." Holmwood writes that "It is a very large book – 619 pages – but it is also poorly edited, repetitive and, I have suggested, partial."
