= Nicola McEwen =

Political scientist

Nicola McEwen FRSE
- Occupations: Professor of Public Policy and Governance and Director of the Centre for Public Policy
- Employer: The University of Glasgow

Nicola McEwen, FRSE is Professor of Public Policy and Governance at the University of Glasgow, Director of the Centre for Public Policy, and senior fellow at the UK in a Changing Europe. She became a Fellow of the Royal Society of Edinburgh in 2021. She leads research on devolution and inter-institutional relations. She provides advice to governments and public bodies and gives media expert perspectives internationally. McEwen's research and insights are sought for public engagement and political or business briefings during major events like the 2014 Scottish Independence Referendum, and the Smith Commission, UK BREXIT and recent elections such as to the Scottish Parliament. She has a reputation for being authoritative and trustworthy in engaging with senior politicians, civil service and civic society and has regular media engagements on various topics. McEwen is consulted on aspects such as potential impact on welfare of Scottish independence, or informing parliament on the impact of Brexit on intra-UK relations and communicating her findings and explanations to public media.

== Education and career ==
Graduated with a B.A.(Honours) in politics and philosophy from Strathclyde University in 1992, McEwen took an M.A. in Political Science at the University of Western Ontario, London, Ontario in 1994, and a Ph.D. in Politics from Sheffield University in 2001.

She has been employed at the University of Edinburgh since 2001, starting in the School of Politics as a lecturer, then senior lecturer before taking on the role of Director of Public Policy at the university's Academy of Government in 2012, and Associate Director for Knowledge Exchange and Impact in the School of Social and Political Science to 2016.

McEwen headed up the Economic and Social Research Council (ESRC) Centre on Constitutional Change from 2013 where she is co-director. She is a Professor of Territorial Politics (from 2014) covering politics and international relations.

She is also a Fellow of the Constitution Unit at University College London.

== Research ==
McEwen has been Fellow on Between Two Unions: The Constitutional Future of the Islands after Brexit, a multi-facet programme funded by ESRC to examine the inter-relationships between institutions, constitutional issues, economic union issues and the social impact of the UK leaving the EU. She is Senior Fellow on another major collaborative research into UK in a Changing Europe . She is currently leading on a £0.5m research project called 'A Family of Nations? Brexit, Devolution and the Union.

A previous 2017 programme she investigated was on the Repatriation of Competences and the Implications for Devolution in the fields of overlapping jurisdictions on agriculture, the environment/energy, and justice & home affairs.

More information on McEwen's research is published by the University of Edinburgh.

== Selected publications ==
Selected by the School of Social and Political Science, University of Edinburgh:

Journal articles and book chapters

- ‘Negotiating Brexit: Power Dynamics in British Intergovernmental Relations’, Regional Studies (2020, forthcoming volume)
- 'Intergovernmental Relations in the UK: Time for a Radical Overhaul?' (with Michael Kenny, Jack Sheldon and Coree Brown Swan), The Political Quarterly, Vol 91/3,
- 'L’autonomie écossaise et le Brexit: deux projets d’autodétermination en collision?', in Levrat, N, D Sidjanski and F Saint-Ouen (eds), L’Union européenne et les nationalismes régionaux (with Alexandra Remond), Publications du Centre de compétences Dusan Sidjanski en études européennes, 2020
- ‘How to conceptualise energy law and policy for an interdisciplinary audience: The case of post-Brexit UK’, (with Paul Cairney, Aileen McHarg and Karen Turner), Energy Policy, 129, June, 2019, 459-66
- ‘Brexit and Scotland: between two unions’, British Politics, 2018, Vol 13/1: 65-78
- Reforming Intergovernmental Relations in the United Kingdom (with Mike Kenny, Jack Sheldon and Coree Brown Swan), Centre on Constitutional Change, 2018
- ‘Inequality, Redistribution and Decentralization in Canada and the United Kingdom’ (with Keith Banting), in Keating, M and G Laforest, Constitutional Politics and the Territorial Question in Canada and the United Kingdom Federalism and Devolution Compared (Springer, 2018)
- ‘Still Better Together? Purpose and Power in Intergovernmental Councils in the UK’, Regional and Federal Studies vol.27/5, 2017: 667-69
- ‘Welfare: Contesting communities of solidarity’, in Keating, M (ed), Debating Scotland: Issues of Independence and Union in the 2014 Referendum (OUP, 2017)
  - ‘Beyond the Referendum’ (with Michael Keating), in Debating Scotland, 2017
  - ‘The Scottish Independence Debate’ (with Michael Keating), in Debating Scotland. 2017
- ‘Towards a Fairer Scotland? Assessing the Prospects and Implications of Social Security Devolution’, in Keating, M (ed), A Wealthier, Fairer Scotland: The Political Economy of Constitutional Change (EUP, 2017)
- ‘A Constitution in Flux: The Dynamics of Constitutional Change after the Referendum’, in Walker, et al., The Scottish independence referendum: constitutional and political implications (OUP, 2016).
- ‘Between Autonomy and Interdependence: The Challenges of Shared Rule after the Scottish Referendum’ (with Bettina Petersohn), in The Political Quarterly. 86, 2, 2015, 192-200
- ‘Empowered for Action? Capacities and constraints in sub-state government climate action in Scotland and Wales’ (with Elin Royles), in Environmental Politics, vol 24, 6, 2015, p1034-1054
- ‘Regions as Primary Political Communities: A multi-level comparative analysis of turnout in regional elections’ (with Ailsa Henderson), in Publius. 45, 2, 2015, p. 189-215
- ‘Constitutional dynamics and partisan conflict: A comparative assessment of multi-level systems in Europe’ (with Wilfried Swenden and Nicole Bolleyer), in Comparative European Politics. 12, 4–5, 2014, p. 531-555
- ‘UK Devolution in the Shadow of Hierarchy: Intergovernmental Relations and Party Politics’ (with Wilfried Swenden), in Comparative European Politics, 12, 4–5, 2014, p488–509
- ‘Sub-State Climate Pioneers: A case study of Scotland’s energy and climate change programme’, (with Elizabeth Bomberg) Regional and Federal Studies vol 24, 1, 2014: p. 63-85
- ‘Energy Policy, Nationalism and Scottish Independence’, in G Hassan and J Mitchell (eds), After Independence: The State of the Scottish National Debate, 2014 (Luath Press)
- ‘The UK: Multi-level Elections in an Asymmetrical State’, in Dandoy, R. & Schakel, A. (eds.) Regional and National Elections in Western Europe: Territoriality of the Vote in Thirteen Countries, Palgrave Macmillan, 2013, p. 254-274
- 'Mobilising community energy' (with Elizabeth Bomberg), Energy Policy, vol.51, 2012, p. 435-444
- 'A comparative analysis of voter turnout in regional elections' (with Ailsa Henderson), Electoral Studies, 29, 3, 2010

Books and special issues

- Constitutional dynamics and partisan conflict: A comparative assessment of multi-level systems in Europe (with Nicole Bolleyer, Wilfried Swenden), Special Issue of Comparative European Politics. 12, 4-5
- Governments in Opposition? Intergovernmental Relations in the UK in a Context of Party Political Incongruence (with Wilfried Swenden and Nicole Bolleyer). Special issue of British Journal of Politics and International Relations, vol.14, no.2, 2012.
- The Territorial Politics of Welfare (Routledge/ECPR Studies in European Political Science, 2009)
- Revolution or Evolution? The 2007 Scottish Elections (with John Curtice, David McCrone, Michael Marsh and Rachel Ormiston), Edinburgh University Press, 2009
- Nationalism and the State: Welfare and Identity in Scotland and Quebec. Regionalism and Federalism Book Series. Presses interuniversitaires europennes/Peter Lang, 2006.
- Devolution and Public Policies (with Michael Keating) (Taylor and Francis, 2006)

== Awards ==
- Fellow of the Royal Society of Edinburgh (2021)
