= Jill Rutter =

Former British civil servant

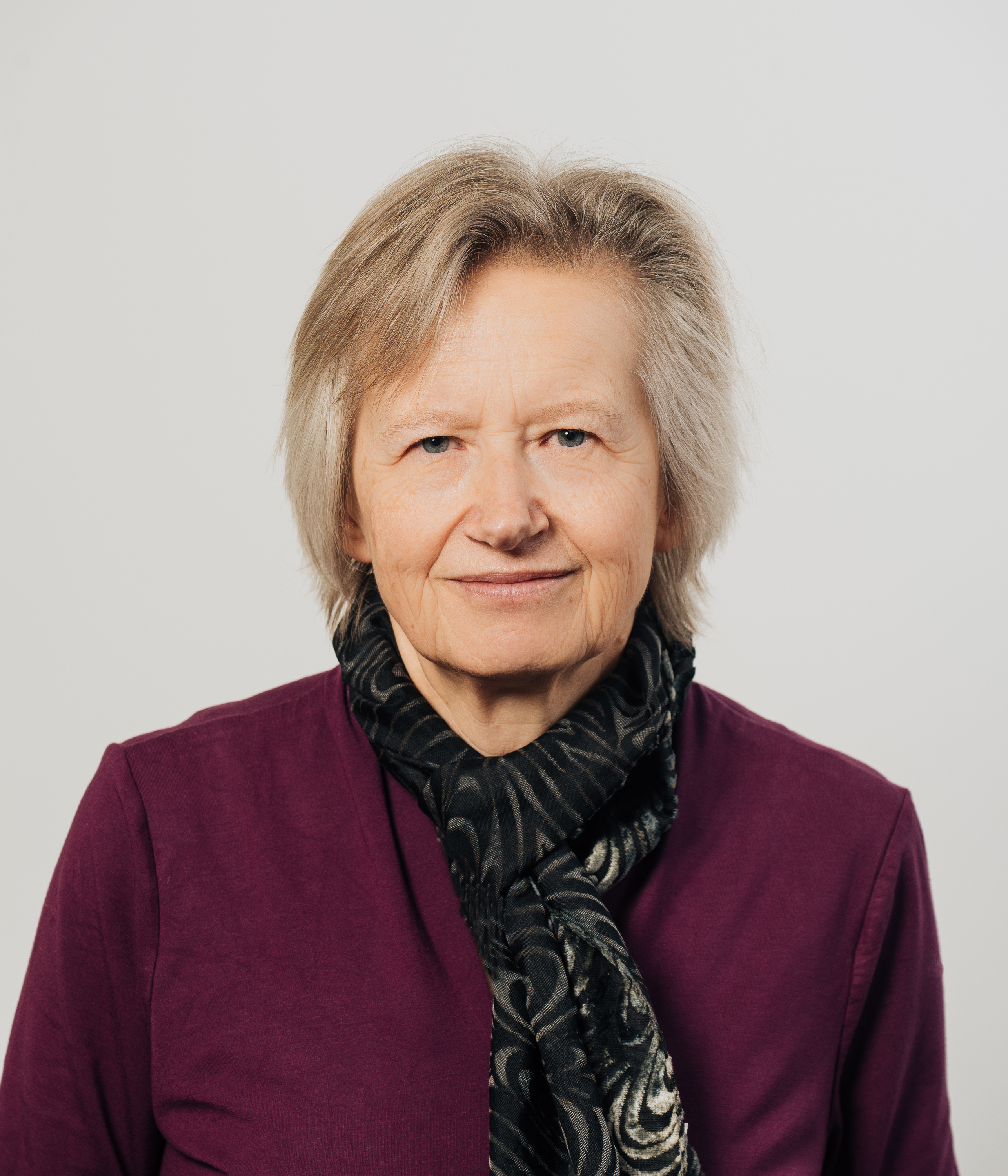
- Education: Somerville College, Oxford
- Occupation: Civil servant

Jill Rutter is a former British civil servant. She is a senior research fellow of UK in a Changing Europe, and was previously the programme director at the Institute for Government (IfG) directing the organisation's work on better policy making and Brexit. She has written a number of reports on civil service and the implications of Brexit for Whitehall and Westminster.

Rutter's writing is frequently in the media and she is a regular commentator on radio and television.

== Education ==
Rutter studied philosophy, politics and economics (PPE) at Somerville College Oxford and graduated with a Bachelor of Arts in 1975. She speaks English, German, Spanish and French.

== Career ==
From 1978 until 1997, Rutter worked for HM Treasury. Her roles included Press Secretary to the Chancellor, Head of Treasury Communications, and Private Secretary to the Chief Secretary. At that time, Rutter was also working on areas such as tax, local government finance, and debt and export finance. From 1998 until 2003 Rutter worked for BP plc. Her roles included Performance Manager for Retail Iberia Business Unit, Integration Manager for Central and Eastern Europe, and Communications and Engagement Director for the Strategic Accounts team in London. From 2004 until 2009, Rutter was Director of Strategy and Sustainable Development at the Department for Environment, Food and Rural Affairs. From 2009 till 2019, Rutter was Programme Director of the Institute for Government. Since 2019, Rutter has worked for UK in a Changing Europe.

== Selected works ==
- Read before Burning: Arm's Length government for a new administration (July 2010), with Tom Gash et al.
- Policy Making in the Real World (April 2011), with Michael Hallsworth and Simon Parker.
- Devolution as Policy Laboratory (January 2016), with Akash Paun and Anna Nicholl.
