= Bloody Nasty People =

2012 book by Daniel Trilling

Bloody Nasty People: The Rise of Britain's Far Right
- Author: Daniel Trilling
- Language: English
- Subject: Far-right politics in the United Kingdom
- Published: London, England, UK
- Publisher: Verso Books
- Publication date: 2012
- Publication place: United Kingdom
- Media type: Print
- Pages: 234
- ISBN: 9781781680803
- Dewey Decimal: 324.241093

Bloody Nasty People: The Rise of Britain's Far Right is a 2012 book about far-right politics in the United Kingdom by British author and journalist Daniel Trilling.

== Synopsis ==
The book charts the rise (and fall) of far-right organisations such as the British National Party and the English Defence League.

== Reception ==
The book was commended by Yasmin Alibhai-Brown in The Independent, who noted that Trilling has "written an instructive account of white extremism in Britain", while in The Guardian, David Edgar described it as a "brisk, compelling narrative". Labour MP Jon Cruddas, who defeated a BNP challenge in Dagenham and Rainham in 2010 also reviewed the book for the New Statesman. Reviews also appeared in Foreign Affairs, New Republic and The Scotsman. Time Out London referred to the work as "pure pavement-pounding journalism" and Owen Jones praised it as "authoritative and eloquent".
