= Robert Ford (academic) =

British political scientist

Robert Ford is a British academic and a professor of political science at the University of Manchester. He frequently writes for The Guardian. His interests include diversity, immigration, and right-wing political parties.

Ford wrote Revolt on the Right (2014) alongside Matthew Goodwin, which focuses on the rise of the right-wing UK Independence Party following its success in the 2014 European Parliament election. The book relates the party's history and examines its voter base.

He later edited Sex, Lies and the Ballot Box: 50 Things You Need to Know About British Elections (2015) with Philip Cowley. This was followed by More Sex, Lies and the Ballot Box: Another 50 Things You Need to Know About Elections (2016), also edited by Ford and Cowley.

Ford authored Brexitland: Identity, Diversity and the Reshaping of British Politics (2020), alongside Maria Sobolewska, which examines British identity, diversity, and immigration in the aftermath of Brexit. He authored The British General Election of 2019 with Tim Bale, Will Jennings, and Paula Surridge about the 2019 general election.

In January 2023, Ford was appointed as a senior research fellow at UK in a Changing Europe, a think tank which examines the ever-changing relationship between the United Kingdom and the European Union.
