= Anand Menon =

British political scientist (born 1965)

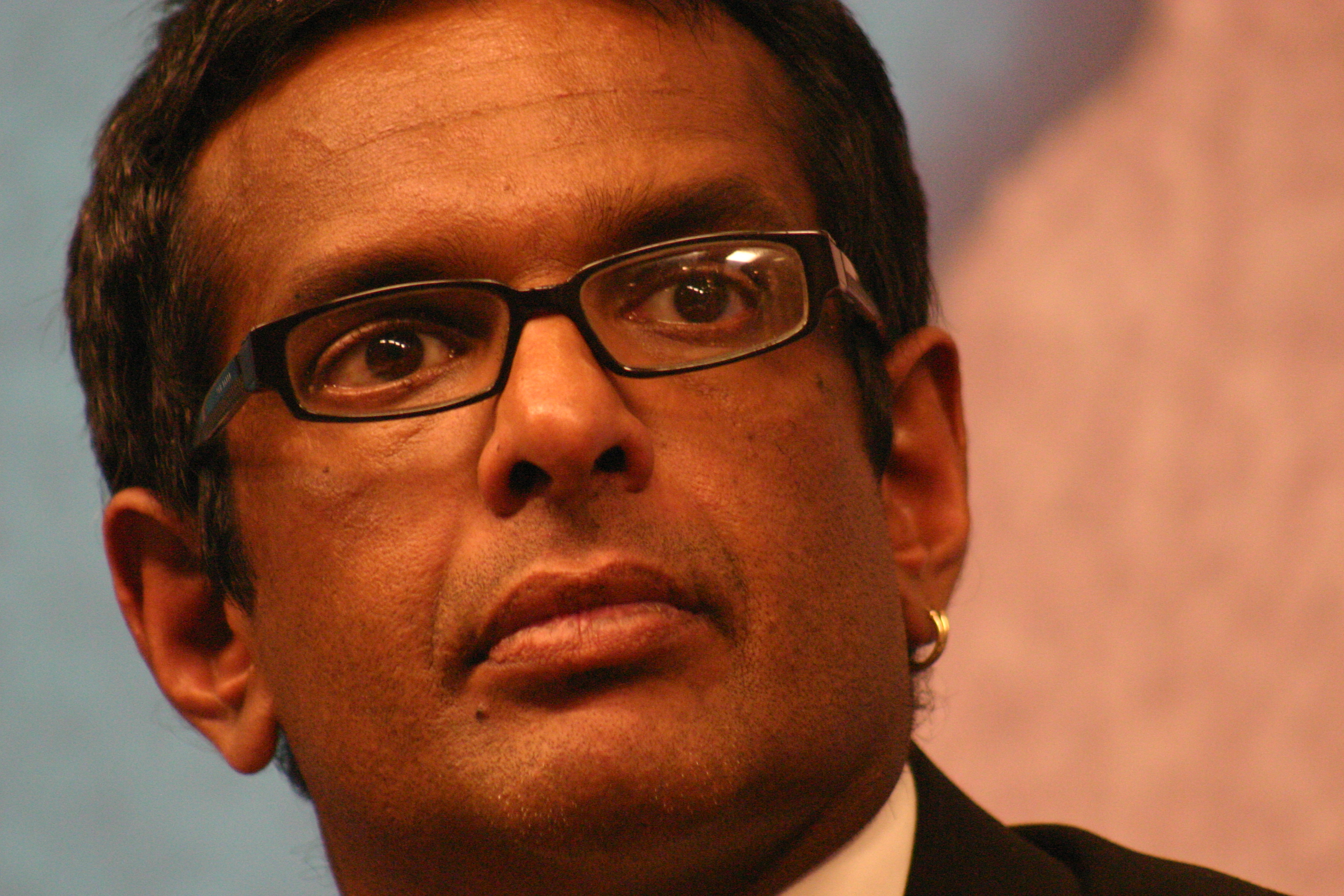
- Menon at Chatham House in 2010
- Born: 15 September 1965 (age 61)

Academic background
- Education: Queen Elizabeth Grammar School, Wakefield
- Alma mater: University of Oxford (1984–1993)

Academic work
- Discipline: European Politics
- Institutions: Director of the UK in a Changing Europe Initiative (2014–present); Department of European & International Studies, King's College London (2013–present); Department of Political Science and International Studies, University of Birmingham (2001–2012); St Antony's College, Oxford (1995–2001)

Anand Menon (born 15 September 1965) is Professor of European Politics and Foreign Affairs at King's College London in the United Kingdom and was appointed in January 2014 as director of the UK in a Changing Europe initiative. He was a special adviser to the House of Lords EU committee.

== Academic career ==
Prior to arriving at King's College, London, Menon lectured at the University of Birmingham. Previously he was Lecturer in European Politics at Oxford University for ten years and a Fellow of St Antony's College, Oxford, for five.

Menon is the Director of UK in a Changing Europe, a think tank funded by the Economic and Social Research Council (ESRC) and based at King's College London.

== Personal life ==
Menon is a lifelong fan of Leeds United F.C. and the India national cricket team.

== Bibliography ==
His publications include European Politics (Oxford University Press, 2007), co-edited with Colin Hay and Europe: The State of the Union (Atlantic Books, 2008), and notable publications for which he has written include the Financial Times, The Independent, the London Review of Books and Prospect.
