= Katy Hayward =

Irish academic

Prof Katy Hayward, Queen's University Belfast, 2024

Katy Hayward is a Northern Irish academic and writer based at Queens University, Belfast.

== Academic career ==
Katy Hayward is Professor of Political Sociology in the School of Social Sciences, Education and Social Work and co-Director of the Centre for International Borders Research in Queen’s University Belfast. She is also co-Director, with Dr Cathal McManus, of Open Learning – Queen’s extensive extramural programme of short, part-time courses for the wider community.

A graduate of UU Magee and University College Dublin, she is a Fellow of the Institute for Peace, Security and Justice, an Eisenhower Fellow, and Europe’s Futures Legacy Fellow at Europe's Futures Initiative. In 2019-22, Hayward was a UK in a Changing Europe Senior Fellow, leading a project on ‘The post-Brexit status and future of Northern Ireland’; in 2021-25 she was co-investigator on the ESRC-funded project Post-Brexit Governance NI (Principal Investigator: Prof. David Phinnemore). For the past decade, she has been coordinator of the Political Attitudes section of the Northern Ireland Life and Times Survey.

In 2020, Prof Hayward was elected a Fellow of the Academy of Social Sciences and in 2023 she was elected a member of the Royal Irish Academy. She has also been awarded the Pippa Norris Prize (team led by Prof. Jonathan Tonge, 2026), a special Ewart-Biggs Memorial Prize and ‘Political Communicator of the Year’ award (Political Studies Association, 2019) for her research on the Irish border, Brexit and socio-political attitudes in contemporary Northern Ireland.

Prof Hayward has presented on these topics to media, policy, civic and academic audiences worldwide, including opinion pieces in the Guardian, the Irish Times, the Daily Telegraph and Politico. Her most recent books are Northern Ireland a Generation after Good Friday (co-authored with Colin Coulter, Peter Shirlow and Niall Gilmartin) and What do we know and what should we do about… the Irish border (2021). Her most recent research and publications address the topic of the impact of Artificial Intelligence on the University and democracy.

== Other work ==
Outside academia, Prof Hayward is a member of the UK Constitution Monitoring Group, the Board of the International Fund for Ireland, a Trustee of the British Irish Association, and sits on the Council of the Economic and Social Research Institute. Hayward is formerly a trustee of Conciliation Resources, an independent organisation working with people in conflict to prevent violence and build peace.
