= Values, Voice and Virtue =

2023 non-fiction book by Matthew Goodwin

Values, Voice and Virtue: The New British Politics is a 2023 book by political scientist Matthew Goodwin, published by Penguin Books. The book's argument has proved to be controversial and it has attracted some highly critical reviews. Values, Voice and Virtue became a Sunday Times Bestseller, entering the non-fiction chart on 9 April 2023 at number 2 in general paperbacks. It was also listed among the Financial Times best summer 2023 books, selected by Gideon Rachman.

== Reception ==
In the Financial Times, Nick Pearce noted that Goodwin's overall thesis is that events such as Brexit, the rising prominence of the radical right, and Boris Johnson's 2019 general election victory are manifestations of a realignment in British politics, which pits marginalised, white working class, and older, socially conservative, non-graduate voters against a "new elite" of progressives who have been university-educated. Reviewing the book in The Times, Sebastian Payne praised it, described its argument as "forceful", and argued that its central thesis was correct, though "his case is a little overstated". Chris Jarvis for Left Foot Forward, however, noted that this "thesis has been highly contentious, not least because the government of the day has shown itself to be anything but liberal on these issues". He noted that Goodwin had also been criticized for the apparent suggestion that liberals have more influence in British society than billionaires or right-wing newspapers.

Kenan Malik wrote that Goodwin's argument that members of what he portrays as the "new elite", including Gary Lineker, Mehdi Hasan and Sam Freedman, shape people's lives more than figures such as Rishi Sunak or Andrew Bailey, the governor of the Bank of England "is, to put it politely, stretching credulity". Similarly, Vladimir Bortun wrote in the LSE Review of Books that Goodwin "fails to demonstrate that the people occupying the most influential positions in British economic and political spheres share a “radically progressive” outlook." Matthew D'Ancona asked "Are Hugh Grant and Emma Watson really running Britain into the ground?", arguing, "Maybe it helps the populist right and their cheerleaders to believe such nonsense." Malik asserted that it was plausible that "Goodwin himself shapes public debate more than most of the "new elite" to whom he points".

Sunder Katwala suggested that Goodwin employs evidence selectively and argued that "The wish to rebut one-dimensional caricatures of the [pro-Brexit] Leave tribe is a valid one, but Goodwin is not above dishing out caricatures of the other half of the country all the same." Former Conservative cabinet minister David Willetts criticized the book for being almost entirely about "culture war" issues and lacking serious engagement with arguments about economic pressures. Nick Pearce and Gerry Hassan also separately noted this lack of focus on economic conditions, while Payne called this "where Goodwin's critique is most lacking", arguing that low economic growth is as responsible for political polarization as cultural divisions. Hassan also criticised the book's failure to include a single sentence on Scotland, Wales or Northern Ireland: "Goodwin, it turns out, is not really talking about "British politics" on populism. Rather he is talking about English populism. Critically and unstated, Goodwin poses this English populism as speaking for and representing Britain, without once noting the fissures and tensions that brings forth".

Bortun summarizes that while the book has received both praise and criticism in mainstream and on social media, "one shortcoming of most reactions has been to treat the book as a scholarly work". Instead, he suggests, Goodwin uses "widely accepted observations", such as the erosion of differences between the Conservative and Labour parties, a relative decline in social mobility and the rise of a broadly liberal middle-class, "to perform a series of logical and empirical leaps in the attempt to push a very transparent political agenda." Reviewing the book in the New Statesman, Oliver Eagleton was critical of it, arguing that Goodwin had become "part of the right-populist movement he once sought to explain". Similarly, Gerry Hassan wrote that "Goodwin has gone from an observer to a participant." Owen Worth, Head of the Department of Politics and Public Administration at the University of Limerick, argued the book lacked originality or depth and "follows and repeats the same contradictions inherent within the ideologies of right-wing populist movements." Martin Shaw compared the book unfavourably with Goodwin's work a decade earlier, arguing that whereas he was previously working with "serious scholars, helping to produce some real research", in Values, Voice and Virtue "he's finally gone solo and it shows." Shaw called the book "a debasement of social-scientific elite theory".

Archie Bland has wrote that when critics point out that those in positions of political power have actively pursued the type of "anti-woke" politics that Goodwin approves of, "Goodwin and his allies argue that these developments are all part of a rearguard action to defend traditional values against an agenda driven by a shadowy minority", and that disagreement with this view is portrayed as "simply proof of their original thesis: that the new elite is out of touch." Similarly, Sarah Manavis noted that in response to negative reviews of the book, Goodwin has argued that "anyone who comes from a privileged background cannot effectively criticise his conclusions – that, by being part of the "new elite", their arguments are null and void, their contradiction somehow proving his point." On Twitter, Goodwin posted a list of critics together with where they had attended university, adding, "have I touched a nerve?"
