= Caitlin Milazzo =

British academic

- Education: University of Nottingham
- Occupation: Academic

Caitlin Milazzo is a British academic at the University of Nottingham. She also writes for The Guardian.

== Career ==
Milazzo joined the School of Politics and International Relations in 2013 and in 2017 was awarded Fellow of the Higher Education Academy. She became Head of School in September 2019. In 2014, Milazzo wrote a book about the UK Independence Party, and the impact on British politics with Matthew Goodwin. She is one of the top experts on political leafleting in elections. Milazzo was awarded the Vice Chancellor's Medal in 2022.

== Bibliography ==
- UKIP: Inside the Campaign to Redraw the Map of British Politics, 2014
