= Matt Goodwin =

British right-wing political commentator (born 1981)

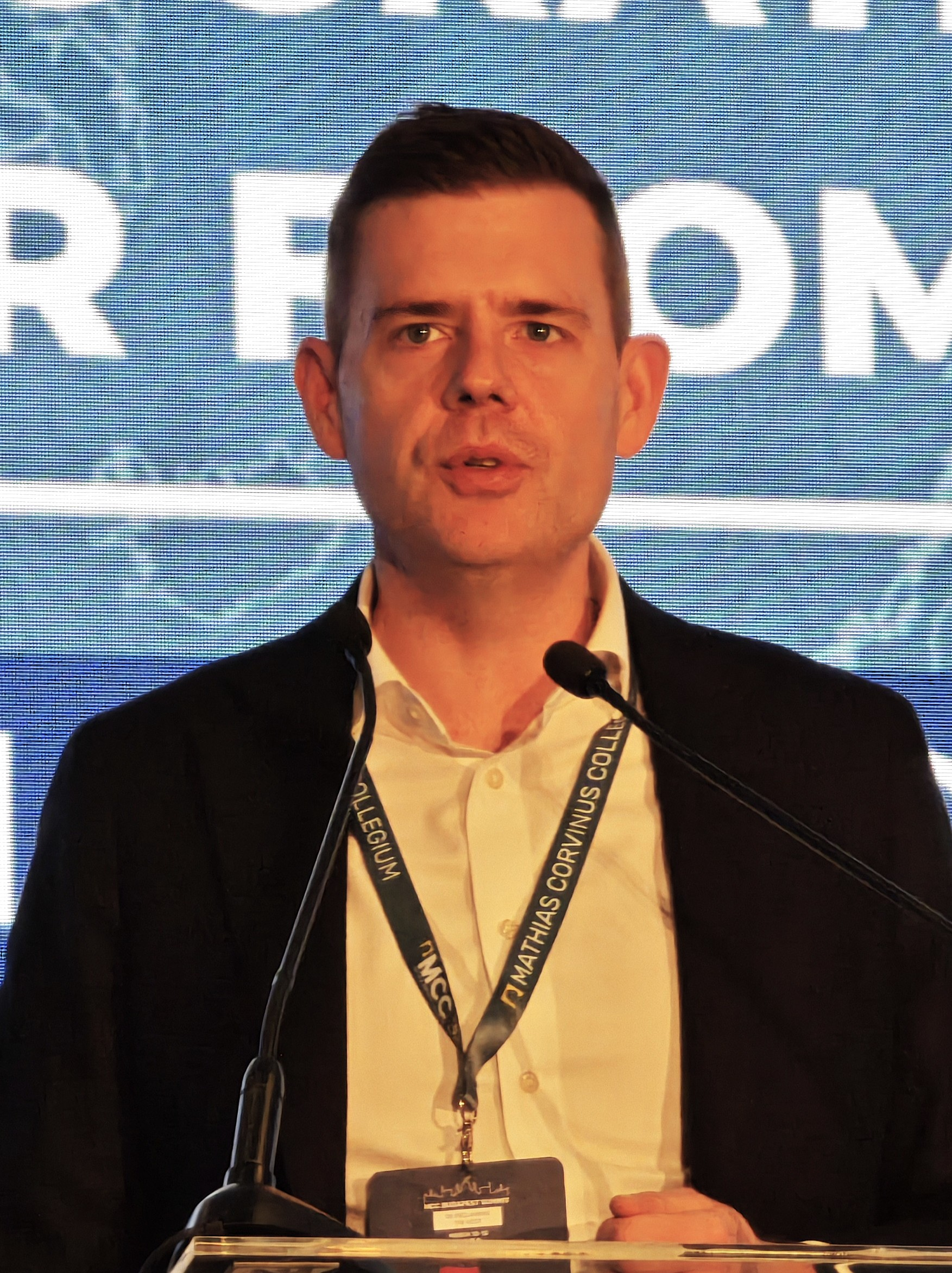
- Goodwin in 2026
- Born: Matthew Goodwin; December 1981 (age 44); St Albans, Hertfordshire, England
- Occupations: Political commentator; academic
- Political party: Reform UK
- Spouse: Fiona McAdoo (m. 2016; div. 2026)
- Partner: Eilidh Hargreaves
- Children: 1

Academic background
- Education: University of Salford (BA); University of Western Ontario (MA); University of Bath (PhD)
- Doctoral advisor: Roger Eatwell

Academic work
- Discipline: Political science
- Institutions: University of Nottingham; University of Kent
- Website: www.mattgoodwin.org

Matthew Goodwin (born December 1981) is a British conservative political commentator, former right-wing political candidate, and former academic. He is known for his research on right-wing movements and right-wing populism in the United Kingdom.

Initially an academic commentator on right-wing and far-right politics in the 2000s and 2010s, by the mid-2020s Goodwin was known for his espousing of strong right-wing views similar to those he had previously studied and criticised. He is a presenter on GB News, and the honorary president of Reform UK's student wing, Students Reform. In 2026 he unsuccessfully stood for election in the constituency of Gorton and Denton in a by-election following his nomination by Reform UK.

Goodwin's most recent academic role was as a professor of politics in the School of Politics and International Relations at the University of Kent, where he was employed for nine years before leaving in July 2024. He also served on the Social Mobility Commission from September 2022 to 2023. He is the author of two Sunday Times best sellers: National Populism: The Revolt Against Liberal Democracy (co-authored with Roger Eatwell) and Values, Voice and Virtue: The New British Politics. He is also the co-author of Revolt on the Right: Explaining Support for the Radical Right in Britain (with Robert Ford), which was long-listed for the 2015 Orwell Prize.

== Early life and education ==
Goodwin was born in December 1981 in St Albans, Hertfordshire, where he was raised by a single mother. His parents split when he was five years old and he has stated that "money was always a problem" in what he described as a "working-class family". Former colleagues of Goodwin have been described by The Times as "somewhat sceptical of this narrative, alleging a hint of self-fashioning", saying, "He's not working class" and "The idea he is some kind of horny-handed son of toil is ridiculous." His father was a senior NHS executive whose roles included Chief Executive of the Greater Manchester Strategic Health Authority. His mother worked for their local NHS health board.

In 2003, Goodwin graduated with a Bachelor of Arts degree in politics and contemporary history from the University of Salford, at which he was offered a place through clearing. He obtained a Master of Arts degree in political science from the University of Western Ontario in 2004, and completed his Doctor of Philosophy degree under the supervision of Roger Eatwell at the University of Bath in 2007.

== Career ==
=== Academic ===
Goodwin was a research fellow at the Institute for Political and Economic Governance at the University of Manchester from 2008 to 2010 and then an associate professor of politics at the University of Nottingham from 2010 to 2015. From 2015 to 2024, he was professor of politics in the School of Politics and International Relations at the University of Kent. According to journalist James Ball, teaching at Kent involved a long commute from London for Goodwin and, around 2016, he tried to secure a professorship at London universities.

Goodwin took voluntary severance and left the University of Kent on 31 July 2024. He said that voluntary severance "made sense for me, as someone in their forties who has done a long stint at universities. Bad actors are trying to imply that I have left because of my views on current events. That is very much not the case". His research has covered a range of topics, including Brexit, British politics, the implications of rising ethnic diversity in the West, and the future of Europe. In 2018, Goodwin published National Populism: The Revolt Against Liberal Democracy (co-authored with Roger Eatwell), which discussed factors that contributed to Brexit.

=== Other work ===
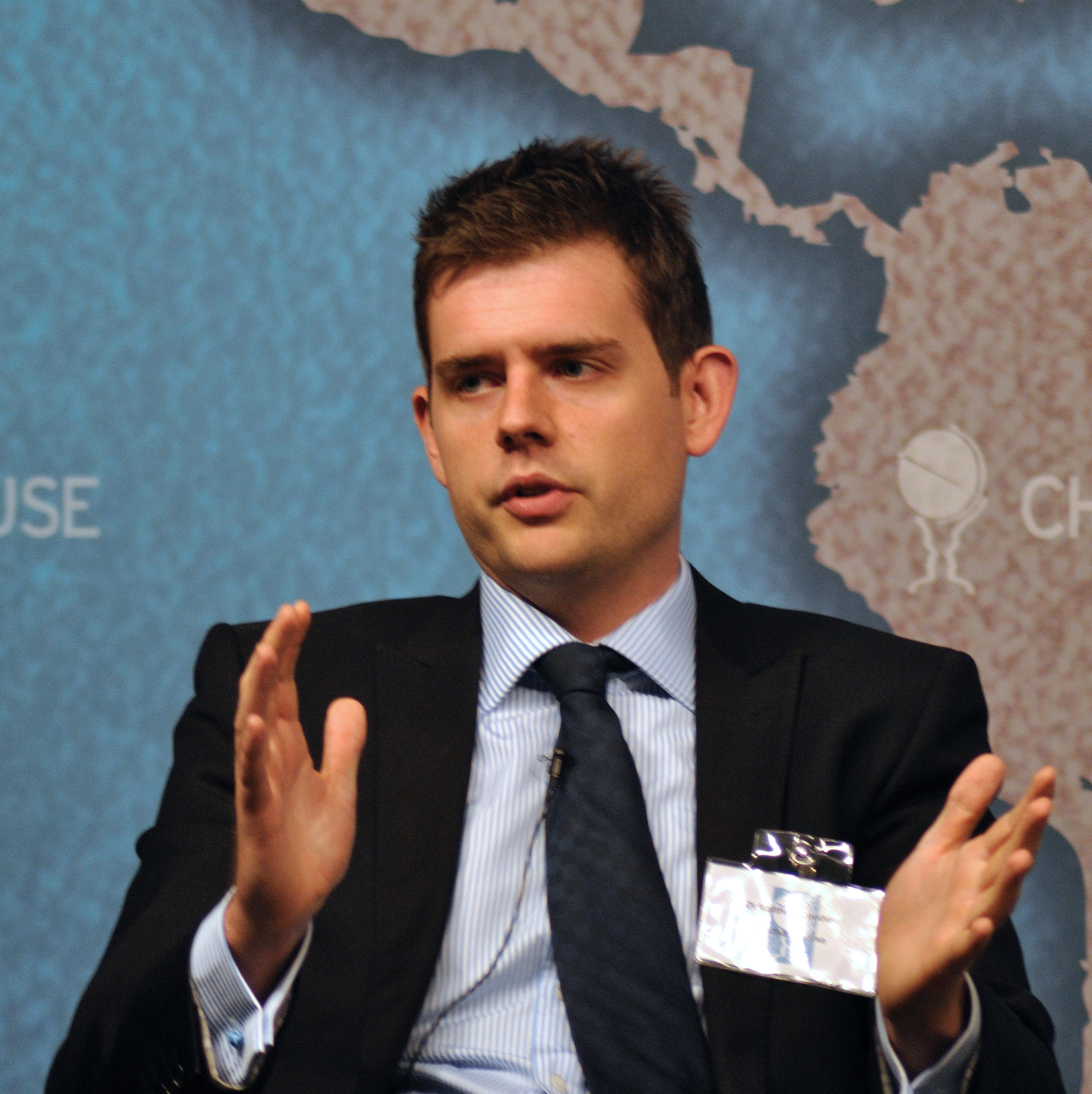
Goodwin at Chatham House in 2011

Alongside his academic positions, Goodwin was associate fellow at Chatham House between 2010 and 2020, where he authored research reports on the rise of populism, Euroscepticism ahead of the Brexit vote, the different political tribes of Europe, and the future of Europe. He is a former senior fellow at the think tank UK in a Changing Europe. In 2021 he was appointed as the founding director of the Centre for UK Prosperity within the Legatum Institute, where he remains a Fellow, leaving in 2023. In February 2026, The Times reported that Goodwin had left Legatum after the report he had been hired to work on was exposed as very poor quality. Goodwin dismissed this as "utter nonsense". Legatum confirmed that the project was abandoned due to a "wholesale re-evaluation of the methodology."

Goodwin is on the advisory panel of the Free Speech Union, a group that seeks to "counter Twitter mobs that drown out opinions they dislike". Goodwin has served as specialist adviser to the House of Commons Education Select Committee on left-behind pupils, and has given evidence to a Public Bill Committee on the importance of defending academic freedom in universities. In September 2022, Goodwin was appointed a commissioner of the Social Mobility Commission. In 2023, the New Statesman named him as the 43rd–most powerful right-wing British political figure of the year. In December 2025, Goodwin was an inaugural guest on Liz Truss' new YouTube series, The Liz Truss Show. In 2025, Goodwin joined Jacob Rees-Mogg as a presenter of State of the Nation on GB News, replacing Rees-Mogg on Wednesdays, Thursdays and Fridays.

After leaving the University of Kent, Goodwin wrote non-academic books, including the self-published Suicide of a Nation: Immigration, Islam, Identity, which was panned by critics, such as Ben Sixsmith, Andy Twelves and Mic Wright, for its style, lack of references and because it contained fabricated quotes (from Cicero, Friedrich Hayek, Roger Scruton, Livy, Noah Webster, James Burnham and Walker Connor). Twelves and Wright speculated that Goodwin used generative AI chatbot ChatGPT to write the book, with the chatbot hallucinating the quotes. Two of the twelve footnotes in the book contained ChatGPT source information in the references' URLs. The incident led to the nickname "MattGPT" for Goodwin.

While Sixsmith did not think Goodwin used AI, he said the book "might as well have been" written by AI given that, in his opinion, it has been "written in the humourless and colourless rhetorical style of AI". He added that Suicide of a Nation "is a very bad book" that "reads like the book of a political operator extending his CV". Goodwin admitted having used AI to obtain data sets, saying he "cross-checked [them] with the original source". Later, Twelves wrote that it appeared Goodwin's book contained fabricated reports, suggesting they had also been invented by AI, and that reports that did exist contradicted the book's thesis. He criticised Goodwin for having lost his academic rigour. Tim Montgomerie, one of Goodwin's Reform UK colleagues, said Goodwin should be investigated by the party and removed from its candidates list if it transpired he had used AI to write his book. Following a debate with Twelves on GB News, Goodwin's GB News colleagues ridiculed him, including him in a section titled "Triggered Tantrums".

Goodwin is a visiting fellow at the Mathias Corvinus Collegium, a conservative educational institution that was funded by Viktor Orbán's Hungarian government. According to the Hungarian investigative media outlet Direkt36, these positions are paid between €5,000 and €10,000 per month. Reform has denied that he was paid €10,000 a month, though has not specified how much he was paid.

=== Reform UK candidacy ===
Goodwin is the honorary president of Reform UK's student wing, Students Reform. On 27 January 2026, Goodwin was announced as the Reform UK candidate for the 2026 Gorton and Denton by-election. His candidacy was endorsed by British far-right activist Tommy Robinson. In response to the endorsement, a Reform spokesperson said of Robinson: "We have consistently been clear on this issue. He isn't welcome in the party."

Goodwin was unsuccessful in his bid to be elected, finishing second to Hannah Spencer of the Green Party, who gained 40.6% of the vote against Goodwin's 28.7%. Labour finished in third place. Following the result Goodwin said: "I think we've embarrassed Labour in one of their strongest seats. The Greens can only do this in 20–30 seats in the country. We can deliver these kinds of results everywhere." He subsequently wrote on X that "We are losing our country. A dangerous Muslim sectarianism has emerged. We have only one general election left to save Britain. Vote Reform every chance you get. I will continue the fight. I will always fight for you. I will stand at the next general election."

Senior figures in the party defended the decision to make Goodwin, who was seen as divisive by many, its candidate.

== Commentary ==
Goodwin's research and writings focus on British politics, radical-right politics, and Euroscepticism. Observers have suggested that Goodwin's political views have shifted considerably rightwards over the course of his career, from being centre-right to holding ethnonationalist, anti-immigration and right-wing populist views by the mid-2020s, having come to resemble the views he had originally studied and criticised.

A major theme of Goodwin's work has been to explain what he calls "the realignment" of British politics that has seen the Labour Party becoming more dependent on the liberal, metropolitan middle-class for its votes, while the Conservative Party has appealed increasingly to working-class, non-university educated voters in former Labour heartlands (the "red wall"). Goodwin recommends that political parties "lean into" this realignment by moving "left on economics and right on culture". On the morning after the Conservatives under Boris Johnson won the 2019 United Kingdom general election, Goodwin tweeted: "it is easier for the right to move left on economics than it is for the left to move right on identity & culture." Kenan Malik wrote that this view was based on an assumption that working-class people are socially conservative, and "the trouble with this argument is that the key feature of Britain over the past half century has been not social conservatism but an extraordinary liberalisation", citing examples such as attitudes to sexuality, premarital sex, and interracial relationships.

Goodwin also criticised the response of the "liberal left" following Brexit, stating: "This intolerance became most visible in the aftermath of the vote for Brexit when I watched many people on the 'liberal' left berate much of the rest of the country as an assortment of racists, bigots, gammons, and morons, all the while making it abundantly clear they had never actually met any of them." He was also critical of what he perceived as radical progressives' shift from liberalism to authoritarianism and silencing of opposing views.

In May 2023, Gerry Hassan wrote that "Goodwin is the populist right's academic of choice, but it seems to have escaped his notice that in the past half century right-wing Tory Governments have been in office for three-quarters of the time." Others have characterised Goodwin as a "populist academic", stating that he turned from observer into participant, becoming an apologist for populism. James Ball argues that it was around 2016, with the Brexit referendum and Donald Trump's election as US president, that "Goodwin's public persona began to transform from that of someone explaining how to counter populist and far-right movements to someone explaining them, justifying their ends, or acting as something of an apologist for them".

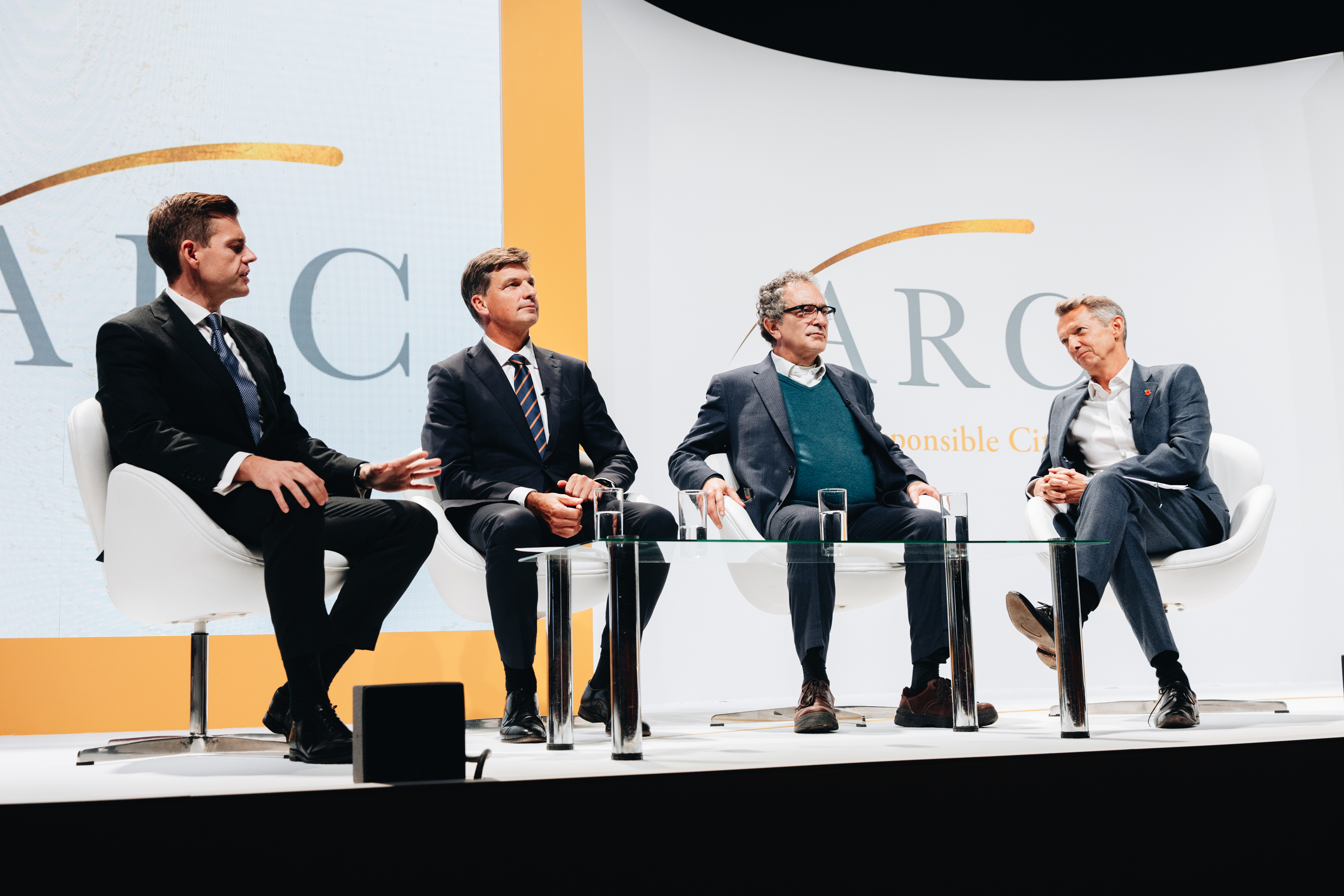
Goodwin (left) on a panel at the Alliance for Responsible Citizenship in 2023.

Goodwin has been criticised for proposing on his blog that people who do not have children should be taxed, in the form of a "negative child benefit tax".

=== On diversity, "wokeism" and racism ===
Goodwin and his National Populism co-author Roger Eatwell, writing about the United States, have argued that political polarisation has been caused by "an increasing fixation or near-total obsession among Democrats and the liberal left with race, gender and 'diversity'". In 2018, Goodwin, along with other commentators including Eric Kaufmann, Claire Fox, Trevor Phillips and David Aaronovitch, was due to take part in an event titled "Is Rising Ethnic Diversity a Threat to the West?" Some researchers argued that the event would encourage "normalisation of far right ideas" and criticised the framing of the title; the debate was retitled "Immigration and Diversity Politics: A Challenge to Liberal Democracy?".

According to Huw Davies and Sheena MacRae, Goodwin's "concerns about wokeism are a recurrent theme in his output". Goodwin has described "wokeism" as "a pseudo-religion". He has acted as an adviser to the Conservative Party and in the July–September 2022 Conservative Party leadership election supported "anti-woke campaigner" Kemi Badenoch, referring to her as "one of the most interesting Conservatives in British politics for a very long time". He supported the Conservative government's Rwanda asylum plan, which would entail deporting asylum seekers to Rwanda, and has advised the party to raise "the salience of cultural issues". Kenan Malik argues that Goodwin now advocates a politics that a decade earlier he would have described as "toxic".

In 2021, when the Commission on Race and Ethnic Disparities, commissioned by Boris Johnson and chaired by Tony Sewell, argued that structural racism did not exist in the UK, Goodwin said this "dismantles the woke mob's central claim that we are living in a fundamentally racist society". Goodwin has also highlighted various instances of public funding for initiatives that he views as symptomatic of this cultural shift.

=== National Conservatism and UK riots ===
Goodwin spoke at the 2023 National Conservatism Conference, where he described the Conservative Party as being in a "prolonged death spiral". Goodwin told CNN that conservatives needed to "decide who they are and what they want to be". For The Atlantic, Helen Lewis wrote that Goodwin gave "a typically doomy speech", which "segued into 10 minutes of pure populist beat poetry". David Aaronovitch described Goodwin's speech as one of the two most "politically coherent" of the conference, calling him "the politics professor turned political entrepreneur". Goodwin has responded to such criticisms in his writings, including in his articles "What Happened To Me?" and "Have I 'radicalised'?". Explaining his decision to participate in the conference, Goodwin wrote: "I'm not a member of the Conservative Party. And unless something changes I don't currently plan on voting Conservative at the next election." He explained that his decision was because "one of the most interesting and important debates in politics right now is where conservatism goes next – not only here in Britain but globally."

During the 2024 United Kingdom riots that followed the 2024 Southport stabbing, Goodwin criticised commentators who labelled the groups engaged in the violence as "far right", writing on X that there had been a "concerted & most likely coordinated effort by the elite class to inflate 'far right' to stigmatise & silence millions of ordinary people who object to mass immigration and its effects". Goodwin praised Hungary under prime minister Viktor Orbán, which he described as having "no crime", "no homeless people", "no riots" and "no unrest". Conservative commentator Tim Montgomerie called Goodwin's posts "incendiary", and ITV News's Joel Hills asked: "Matt, are you still at the University of Kent? I ask because it's so hard to imagine a serious academic publishing something like this." Robert Ford, with whom Goodwin wrote Revolt on the Right in 2014, had by August 2024 "ended contact with Goodwin", saying "I tried for several years to reason with him on this but to no avail. Once I could see where this was heading I cut ties and became a more public critic".

Goodwin maintains that immigration to the UK constitutes an "invasion". In a 2024 debate on immigration with Al Jazeera's Mehdi Hasan, Hasan remarked that Goodwin has "gone native". After the 2025 Cambridgeshire train stabbing was reported in the news, Goodwin posted on X that "mass uncontrolled immigration" was to blame. When someone responded that the suspect, Anthony Williams, was born in the UK, Goodwin replied "So were all of the 7/7 bombers. It takes more than a piece of paper to make somebody 'British'". He was subsequently accused by the Liberal Democrats' home affairs spokesperson, Max Wilkinson, of using racist rhetoric. Goodwin responded by stating: "What I said isn't racist. They devalue the term by saying this."

=== Political predictions ===
On 27 May 2017, Goodwin predicted that the Labour Party would not reach 38 per cent of the vote in the 2017 United Kingdom general election and said he would eat his book if they did. As the party won 40.0% of the popular vote, Goodwin chewed one page out of his book, live on Sky News, on 10 June 2017.

In March 2024, Goodwin wrote in The Sun: "Eight years ago I did some political fortune-telling that led to people thinking I was insane. I was one of only a few analysts who predicted that not only would Britain vote to leave the EU but also that America would elect President Donald Trump." Will Jennings of the University of Southampton said that when speaking at an event at the London School of Economics on the day of the Brexit referendum, Goodwin actually predicted a two-point Remain win.

While Goodwin gave Trump a better chance of winning in the 2016 US presidential election than some pundits, he nonetheless wrote that Trump "would most likely fail". Goodwin also incorrectly predicted that Trump would win the 2020 election.

== Personal life ==
Goodwin lives in Hitchin, Hertfordshire. He was married to Fiona McAdoo from 2016 to 2026, and they have one daughter together. They separated in 2023. His current partner is Eilidh Hargreaves, a journalist at Tatler, whom he met at the 2025 Spectator Awards.

== Bibliography ==
- Goodwin, Matthew (2011). New British Fascism: The Rise of the British National Party. Routledge. ISBN 978-0415465007.
- Ford, Robert; Goodwin, Matthew (2014). Revolt on the Right: Explaining Support for the Radical Right in Britain. Routledge. ISBN 9780415661508.
- Goodwin, Matthew; Milazzo, Caitlin (2015). UKIP: Inside the Campaign to Redraw the Map of British Politics. Oxford University Press. ISBN 9780198736110.
- Clarke, Harold D.; Goodwin, Matthew; Whiteley, Paul (2017). Brexit: Why Britain Voted to Leave the European Union. Cambridge University Press. ISBN 9781316605042.
- Eatwell, Roger; Goodwin, Matthew (2018). National Populism: The Revolt Against Liberal Democracy. Pelican Books. ISBN 9780241312001.
- Goodwin, Matthew (2023). Values, Voice and Virtue: The New British Politics. Penguin Books. ISBN 9780141999098.
- Goodwin, Matthew (2025). Bad Education: Why Our Universities Are Broken and How We Can Fix Them. Penguin Books. ISBN 9781787635241.
- Goodwin, Matt (2026). Suicide of a Nation: Immigration, Islam, Identity. self-published. ISBN 9781919401409.

== Honours ==
In 2014, aged 33, Goodwin was awarded the Richard Rose Prize by the Political Studies Association, which is given to one early-career academic each year for their contribution to research. The award was made at the organisation's conference on 14–16 April and Goodwin was appointed their director on 27 June, resigning on 24 June 2016. He co-authored the book Revolt on the Right: Explaining Support for the Radical Right in Britain, which was long-listed for the 2015 Orwell Prize.
