= Paula Surridge =

Political sociology professor

Paula Surridge is a political sociology professor at the University of Bristol and deputy director at UK in a Changing Europe. She uses large-scale quantitative data to study social and political values and voting behaviour.

== Books ==
Surridge has coauthored several books, including:

- The Scottish Electorate: The 1997 General Election and Beyond (with Alice Brown, David McCrone, and Lindsay Paterson, Palgrave Macmillan, 1999)
- New Scotland, New Politics? (with A. Brown, J. Curtice, K. Hinds, D. McCrone, A. Park, L. Paterson; Polygon at Edinburgh, 2001)
- The British General Election of 2019 (with Robert Ford, Will Jennings, and Tim Bale, Palgrave Macmillan, 2021)

She is also the coeditor of Spatial and Social Disparities (with J. Stillwell, C. Norman, C. Thomas; Springer, 2010)
