= Elliot Jager =

American-born Israeli journalist (born 1954)

- אליוט ג'אגר
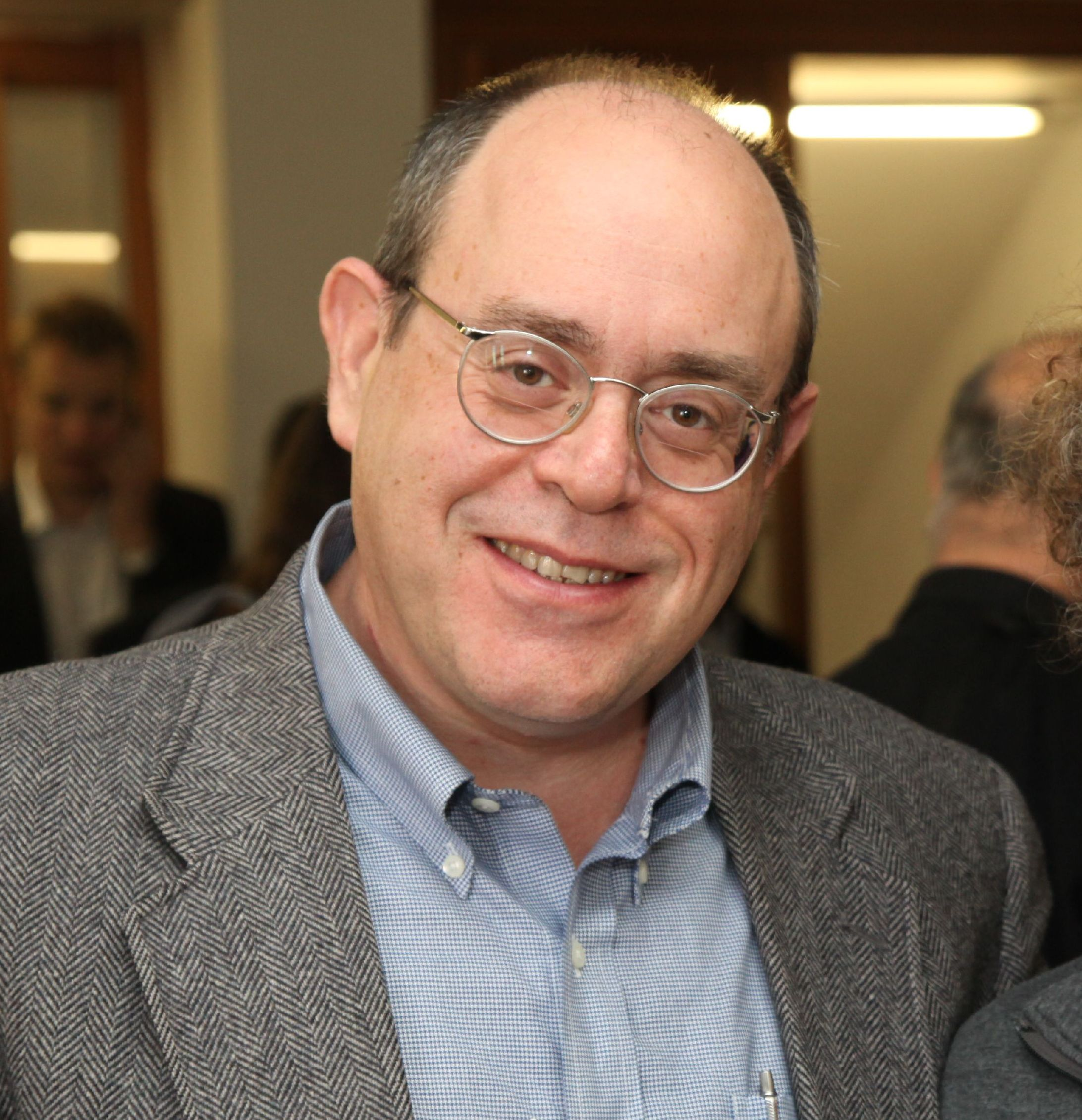
- Jager in 2011
- Born: November 3, 1954 (age 71)
- Education: Brooklyn College; New York University
- Occupations: Journalist; writer; political scientist
- Writing career
- Subjects: Israel; Holocaust
- Notable works: The Pater: My Father, My Judaism, My Childlessness

Elliot Jager (Hebrew: אליוט ג'אגר; born November 3, 1954) is an American-born Israeli journalist, political scientist, and author. He is a former editor at The Jerusalem Post. His first book, the memoir The Pater: My Father, My Judaism, My Childlessness, was published in 2015. His second, The Balfour Declaration: Sixty-Seven Words—100 Years of Conflict, came out in 2017. His latest book is Jewish Civilization and Its Discontents: A Post-October 7 Primer & Polemic, published in 2024.

== Biography ==
=== Early life and work ===
Jager was born and raised on New York City's Lower East Side. His father was a Romanian-born Holocaust survivor who left for Israel when Jager was eight. Raised by his mother Yvette, Jager received a strictly Orthodox Jewish education. He obtained a BA in Judaic studies from Brooklyn College in 1977 and completed his MA (1988) and Ph.D. (1994) in political science at New York University.

Jager worked for the New York City Department of Health from 1973 until 1997 while attending college and university in the evening. He headed the control unit of the agency's lead poisoning program and was office services director for the Bureau of Operations before he left the agency. From 1984 until 1997, he taught political science as an adjunct visiting professor at NYU, Baruch College, Hofstra University, and Rutgers University. In 1997, Jager moved to Israel, where he met his wife, Lisa Clayton, a writer and editor.

=== Dissertation ===
Jager's Ph.D. dissertation examined the activities of the organized American Jewish community in regard to the 1988 decision by the United States to enter into a diplomatic dialogue with the Palestine Liberation Organization.

=== Journalistic and literary career ===
Between 1997 and 1999, Jager was a contributor to Jewish Ledger and Jewish Exponent. He joined the staff of The Jerusalem Post in 1999, holding various editorial positions at the paper, including literary editor, week-in-review editor, op-ed editor, and—taking over from Saul Singer—editorial page editor reporting to editor-in-chief David Horovitz. Jager left the Post to become the founding managing editor of Jewish Ideas Daily. He became a freelance writer in 2013, contributing regularly to such outlets as Newsmax and Israel My Glory magazine. In November 2015, he published his memoir, The Pater: My Father, My Judaism, My Childlessness. His second book, The Balfour Declaration: Sixty-Seven Words—100 Years of Conflict, was published in 2017. In October 2024, he put out Jewish Civilization and Its Discontents: A Post-October 7 Primer & Polemic.

== Bibliography ==
- The Pater: My Father, My Judaism, My Childlessness (2015)
- The Balfour Declaration: Sixty-Seven Words—100 Years of Conflict (2017)
- Jewish Civilization and Its Discontents: A Post-October 7 Primer & Polemic (2024)
