= Monica Toft =

American international relations scholar

Monica Duffy Toft
- Known for: Theory of Indivisible Territory
- Awards: Carnegie Scholar (2008); Fulbright Scholarship (2012); Princeton World Politics Fellowship (2015)

Academic background
- Education: Defense Language Institute; University of California, Santa Barbara (BA); University of Chicago (MA, PhD)
- Thesis: The Geography of Ethnic Conflict (1998)

Academic work
- Discipline: International Relations
- Sub-discipline: International Security, strategic Studies, political Demography
- Institutions: Harvard University; University of Oxford; Tufts University; Naval War College
- Website: fletcher.tufts.edu/people/monica-toft

Monica Duffy Toft is an American international relations scholar. Her research interests include international security and strategy, ethnic and religious violence, civil wars, and the relationship between demography and national security. Among her research specialties, her theory of indivisible territory explains how certain conflicts turn violent while others not, and when it is likely for a conflict to become a violent. Since 2017 she holds the position of Professor of International Politics at the Fletcher School of Law & Diplomacy at Tufts University, and Director of the Fletcher School's Center for Strategic Studies.

== Life and career ==
=== Education ===
Toft graduated from the U.S. Army's Defense Language Institute in 1984 with highest honours. She then completed the Associate of Arts General Curriculum of the University of Maryland's European Division in 1987. In 1990 Toft graduated summa cum laude with a B.A. in political science and Slavic languages and literature from the University of California Santa Barbara. She went on to the University of Chicago, where she completed both an M.A. (1992) and a Ph.D. (1998) in political science. The title of her doctoral dissertation was The Geography of Ethnic Conflict.

=== Career ===
Toft's professional career began in the U.S. Army where she worked as a Russian linguist from 1983 to 1987. After completing her education, Toft joined the faculty at Harvard University where she was a professor of international politics at the Kennedy School of Government and Assistant Director of the John M. Olin Institute for Strategic Studies. When the Olin Institute closed in 2007, Toft then established and directed the Initiative on Religion in International Affairs at the Kennedy School. In September 2012, Toft joined the faculty of the Blavatnik School of Government at the University of Oxford as Professor of Government and Public Policy. During this period, she also spent four months as Professor of Strategy at the Naval War College in Newport, Rhode Island. She left Oxford in 2017 to join Tufts University.

Toft is a member of the Council on Foreign Relations, the Minorities at Risk Advisory Board, and the Political Instability Task Force. She is also Principal Investigator of the Commonwealth Initiative on Religious Freedom or Belief and a senior research scholar with the Modeling Religion Project, Institute for the Biocultural Study of Religion, Boston University.

Her work has been recognised through numerous awards, grants and fellowships, including being named Carnegie Scholar by the Carnegie Foundation of New York for her research on religion and violence in 2008, awarded a Fulbright Scholarship to Norway in 2012, and granted Princeton's World Politics Fellowship in 2015 .

== Personal life ==
Toft is married to Ivan Arreguín-Toft, also a scholar of international security and strategic studies and an Assistant Professor of International Relations at Boston University.

== Books ==
- Political Demography: How Population Changes Are Reshaping International Security and National Politics (with Jack Goldstone and Eric Kaufmann, Oxford, 2012)
- Rethinking Religion in World Affairs (with Alfred Stepan and Timothy Shah, Oxford, 2012)
- God’s Century: Resurgent Religion and Global Politics (with Daniel Philpott and Timothy Shah, Norton, 2011)
- Securing the Peace: The Durable Settlement of Civil Wars (Princeton, 2010)
- The Fog of Peace and War Planning: Military and Strategic Planning under Uncertainty (with Talbot Imlay, Routledge, 2006)
- The Geography of Ethnic Violence: Identity, Interests, and the Indivisibility of Territory (Princeton, 2003)

== Other academic publications ==
- "Grounds for War: The Evolution of Territorial Conflict," International Security 38, issue 3, Winter 2013/2014.
- "Denial and Punishment in the North Caucasus: Evaluating the Effectiveness of Coercive Counterinsurgency," with Yuri Zhukov, Journal of Peace Research, November 2012.
- “Self-Determination, Secession and Civil War,” Terrorism and Political Violence, Summer 2012.
- “Demography and National Security: Population Shifts in Israel and the Implications for Policy,” International Area Studies Review, Vol. 15, No. 21 (March) 2012.
- “Correspondence on “Ending Civil Wars? A Case for Rebel Victory,”” International Security, Summer 2011.
- “Ending Civil Wars? A Case for Rebel Victory,” International Security, Spring 2010.
- “Promises and Pitfalls in the Spatial Prediction of Ethnic Violence: A Comment,” co-authored with Nils B. Wiedmann, Conflict Management and Peace Science, 2009.
- “Dynamics of Self-Determination,” with Stephen Saideman, Peace and Conflict 2010, Paradigm, 2009.
- “Power Shifts and Civil War: A Test of Power Transition Theory,” International Interactions, Vol. 33, No. 3 (July–September 2007).
- “Getting Religion? The Puzzling Case of Islam and Civil War,” International Security, Vol. 31, No. 4 (Spring 2007).
- “The Myth of the Borderless World: Refugees and Repatriation Policy,” Conflict Management and Peace Science, Vol. 24 (2007).
- “Religion, Civil War, and International Order,” Belfer Center Discussion Paper, August 2006.
- “Issue Divisibility and Time Horizons as Rationalist Explanations for War,” Security Studies, Vol. 15, No. 1 (January–March 2006).
- “The State of the Field: Demography and War,” ECSP Report, Issue 11, 2005.
- “Indivisible Territory, Geographic Concentration, and Ethnic War,” Security Studies, Winter 2002/03.
- “Differential Demographic Growth in Multinational States: The Case of Israel’s Two-Front War,” Review of International Affairs, Fall 2002.
- “Multinationality, Regions and State-Building: The Failed Transition in Georgia,” Regional and Federal Studies, Vol. 11, No. 3 (Autumn 2001).
- “The 1994 Russian Federal Budget Debate: Issues and Implications,” RAND Corporation, Policy Memorandum, September 1994.
- “Adoption as an Issue of Local Justice,” with David P. McIntyre, Archives Européennes de sociologie, Spring 1992.
