= Dudley L. Poston Jr. =

American academic (born 1940)

Dudley L. Poston, Jr.
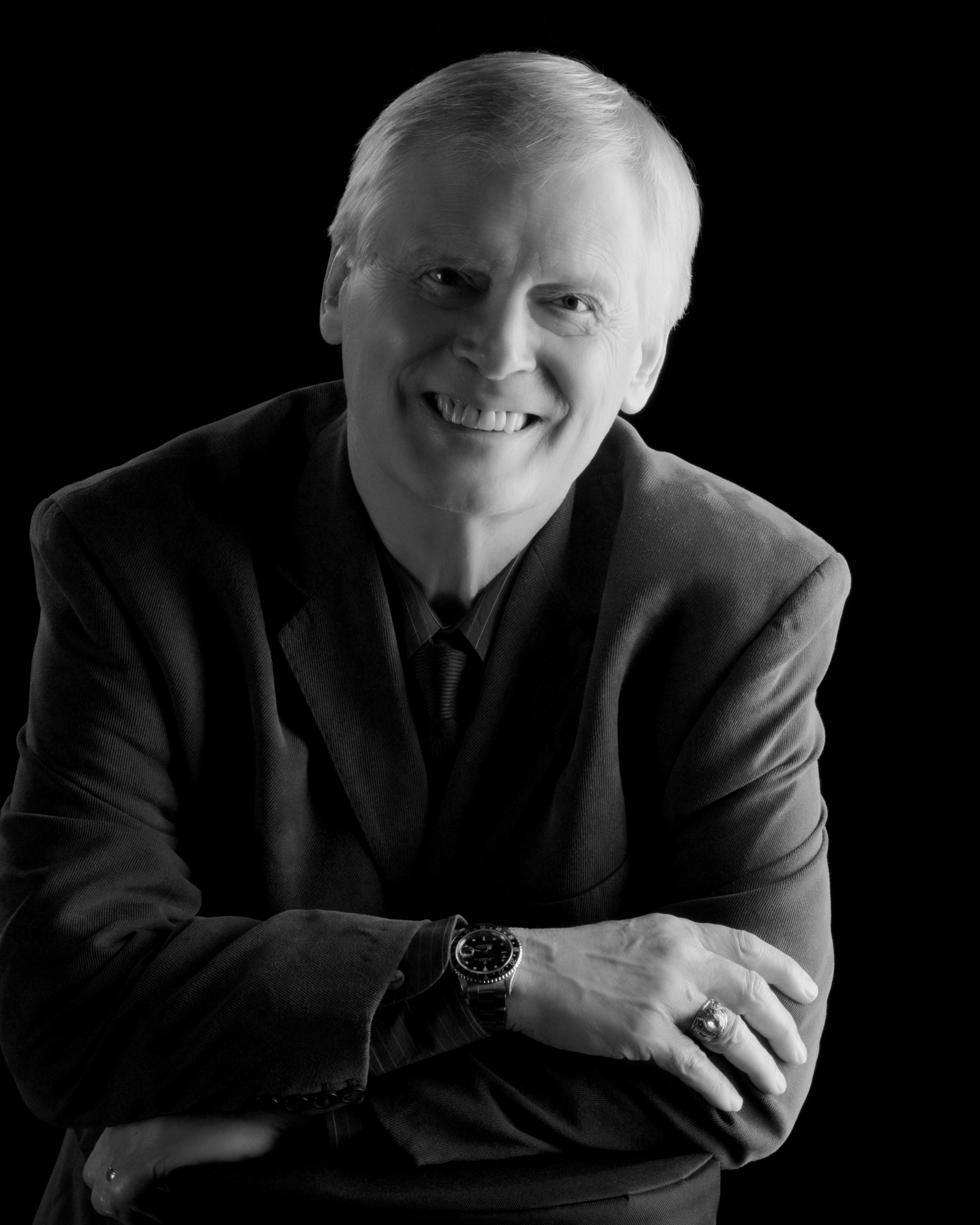
- Born: November 29, 1940 (age 85); San Francisco, California
- Education: St. Gabriel's Grammar School, San Francisco
- Alma mater: University of Oregon (PhD); San Francisco State College (MA); University of San Francisco (BA)
- Scientific career
- Fields: Demography, human ecology, and sociology
- Workplaces: Texas A&M University; Renmin University of China; Fuzhou University; Nanjing Normal University; Cornell University; University of Texas, Austin

Dudley Louis Poston Jr. is an American academic whose areas of study include Demography, Human Ecology, and Sociology.

== Early and personal life ==
Dudley L. Poston Jr. was born in San Francisco, California, on 29 November 1940. Poston served on active duty in the U.S. Army as a first lieutenant and as a captain from 1968 to 1970, including a tour of nearly one full year in 1969–70 in South Vietnam. Among his military honors and awards are the Bronze Star, and the Army Commendation Medal, with one oak leaf cluster, both awarded in 1970, for his service in Vietnam.

== Education ==
Poston attended St. Gabriel's Grammar School in San Francisco. He attended St. Joseph's Seminary in Mountain View, CA, for his first few years of high school, and then transferred to St. Ignatius High School (in San Francisco) where he graduated in 1958.

He attended the University of San Francisco (USF) graduating in 1963 with a BA degree in sociology. At USF he processed through four majors before he found sociology. The sociology courses he completed under Father Eugene Schallert, SJ and Dr. Ralph Lane had a big influence on his decision to continue his study of sociology in graduate school.

He received his M.A. degree in sociology in 1967 from San Francisco State College and his PhD degree in sociology and demography in 1968 from the University of Oregon.

== Career ==
Poston's research interests include demography, human ecology, and the sociology of gender, with special attention to the populations of China, Taiwan, and Korea. He is the only one of two non-Chinese persons to ever be elected to be President of the North American Chinese Sociologists Association, serving for 2 years, from 1995 to 1997. Further, Poston has made significant contributions to the emerging field of the Social Demography of Sexual Orientation. He also loves to mentor students and has a lengthy and noteworthy list of previous students. In his 49+ years as a faculty member at three universities, Poston chaired the doctoral committees of 65 graduate students who received their PhD degrees under his direction.

Poston served as faculty at the Population Research Center, The University of Texas at Austin' Associate Director (1970–74); acting director (1974–75); research associate (1975–77); associate director (1977–81); director (1981–1986); and research associate (1987–1988). He served at Cornell University, Ithaca, New York (1988–1992) as professor of rural sociology and Asian studies; research associate, Population and Development Program, Cornell University, Ithaca, New York (1988–1992); and chair, Department of Rural Sociology, Cornell University, Ithaca, New York (1989–1992). He next served as professor, Department of Sociology, Texas A&M University, College Station, Texas (1992–2019); Samuel Rhea Gammon Professor of Liberal Arts, Texas A&M University (1992–1998);George T. and Gladys H. Abell Professor of Liberal Arts, Texas A&M University (1998–present); head, Department of Sociology, Texas A&M University, College Station, Texas (1992–1997); and director, Asian Studies Program, Texas A&M University, College Station, Texas (2007–2012).

While at Texas A&M Poston also serves as guest professor of demography at the People's University in Beijing, China; guest professor of cultural studies and sociology at Fuzhou University, Fuzhou, China; and adjunct professor of demography, Nanjing Normal University, Nanjing, China. In 1987 he was visiting research professor of sociology, National Taiwan University, Taipei, Taiwan, Republic of China. Poston is presently emeritus professor of sociology, Texas A&M University (2019–present).

== Publications ==
Dr. Poston has authored/co-authored/edited twenty-one books and over 380 refereed journal articles, chapters and reports on various sociological and demographic topics. His most recent books include the 2nd edition of Population and Society: An Introduction to Demography (with Leon Bouvier), (Cambridge University Press, 2017), and the 2nd edition of the Handbook of Population (Springer Publishers, 2019). He is also the series editor of the International Handbooks of Population, published by Springer Press.

- Census 80: Continuing the Factfinder Tradition (1980) U.S. Gov.Printing Office, Stock No. 003-024-0226-1 The Population of the South (1981)
- Essays in Population Economics (1991)
- The Population of Modern China (with David Yaukey) (1992) ISBN 978-0-306-44235-3
- Thirty Million Texans? (1993) ISBN 1881290204
- Zhongguo Dusheng Zinu Yanjiu (Research on Single Children in China) (1996)
- Continuities in Sociological Human Ecology (1998) ISBN 978-0-306-45610-7
- The Chinese Triangle of mainland China, Taiwan and Hong Kong (2001) ISBN 978-0313308697
- The Handbook of Population (co-edited with Michael Micklin), (2005) ISBN 978-0-306-47768-3
- Fertility, Family Planning and Population Policy in China (co-edited) (2006) ISBN 978-0415323307
- Healthy Longevity in China: Demographic, Socioeconomic, and Psychological Dimensions (2008) ISBN 978-1-4020-6751-8
- Gender Policy and HIV in China: Catalyzing Policy Change (2009) ISBN 978-9048182190
- Same-Sex Partners: The Demography of Sexual Orientation, with Amanda Baumle and D’Lane Compton (2009) ISBN 978-0-7914-7609-3
- Population and Society: An Introduction to Demography (2010)ISBN 978-0521872874
- The Family and Social Change in Chinese Societies (co-edited with W. S.Yang and D.N. Farris) (2014)ISBN 978-9400774445
- Population and Society 2nd Edition (2017) ISBN 978-1107645936
- Low Fertility Regimes and Demographic and Societal Change (2018) ISBN 978-3-319-64059-4. DOI https://doi.org/10.1007/978-3-319-64061-7.
- The Handbook of Population 2nd edition (2019) ISBN 978-3030109097
- Developments in Demography in the 21st Century (co-edited with J. Singelmann) (2020) ISBN 978-3-030-26492-5
- International Handbook of the Demography of Obesity (co-edited with G. Garcia-Alexander) (2022) ISBN 978-3-031-10936-2
- Applied Regression Models in the Social Sciences (with Conde and Field) (forthcoming 2023).

== Selected honors and awards ==
- American Sociological Association Population Section: member of council (1980–82); chair and chair-elect (1982–84); member, nominations committee (1994–96); member, Committee on Certification and Licensure (1996–99)
- American Statistical Association: member, Committee on Public Affairs, American Statistical Association (2001–2008)
- International Sociological Association: Research Committee 41 (Sociology of Population): president (1995–1999); member of executive committee (1999–2008).
- North American Chinese Sociologists Association: president, 1995–1997; past president and member of council, 1997–2003
- Population Association of America: board of directors (1980–81); member of nominations committee (1982¬-83).
- Rural Sociological Society: publications committee member (1990–93) and chair (1993–94); chair, Subcommittee on Mentoring and Climate (1995–1997); member, diversity committee (1995–1999)
- Southwestern Social Science Association: member of executive committee (1977–79); second vice-president (1981–82); first vice-president (1982–83); president (1983–84); vice-president (2002–2003); president-elect (2003–2004); president (2004–2005)
- Southern Demographic Association: member of executive committee (1974–75); president (1975–77); member, consulting board, Center for Immigration Research, University of Houston (1996–2006) .
- Witness, Hearings before the Select Committee on Population, U.S. House of Representatives, Ninety-fifth Congress (1979)
- Member, U.S. Census Bureau scientific advisory committee, 2005–2011

== Additional awards ==
- Recipient, Distinguished Alumnus of the Year Award, University of Oregon, 1991
- Recipient, Research Excellence Award of the Rural Sociological Society, 1994
- Recipient, Distinguished Achievement in Research Award, Texas A&M University, Spring, 1998
- Recipient, Distinguished Achievement in Teaching Award, College of Liberal Arts, Texas A&M University, Fall, 2000
- Recipient, Distinguished Achievement in Graduate Mentoring, Texas A&M University, Spring, 2009
- Recipient, Distinguished Service Award in Honor of Norma Williams, Southwestern Sociological Association, March, 2010
- Recipient, Social Scientist of the Year Award, Southwestern Social Science Association, March, 2011 (this is the highest award given by the SSSA).
