= Rogelio Sáenz =

- Education: Iowa State University (M.S. 1984, Ph.D. 1986); Pan American University (B.S. 1981)
- Known for: Research on Latino/Hispanic demography, race and ethnic relations, immigration and migration
- Awards: César E. Chávez Award (2018); Research/Teaching Award, American Association for Hispanics in Higher Education (2003)
- Scientific career
- Fields: Demography, Sociology
- Workplaces: University of Texas at San Antonio; Texas A&M University (former); Carsey School of Public Policy, University of New Hampshire (senior fellow)

Rogelio Sáenz is currently Professor in the Department of Demography at the University of University of Texas at San Antonio and the Mark G. Yudof Endowed Chair at the University of Texas at San Antonio. Prior to joining UTSA, Sáenz was Professor of Sociology and former Department Head at the Department of Sociology at Texas A&M University.

Sáenz is also a senior fellow at the Carsey School of Public Policy at the University of New Hampshire.

Sáenz's research expertise is on Latina/os/Hispanics in the United States, race and ethnic relations, inequality and poverty, immigration and migration, public policy, social justice, and human rights. He is co-author of Latinos in the United States: Diversity and Change (Polity Press); co-editor of The International Handbook of the Demography of Race and Ethnicity (Springer Press); and co-editor (with Havidan Rodriguez and Cecilia Menjivar) of Latinas/os in the United States: Changing the Face of América (2008, Springer). Among his national recognitions are the 2018 Cesar Estrada Chavez Award from the American Association for Access, Equity, and Diversity, and the 2003 Research/Teaching Award from the American Association for Hispanics in Higher Education.

Saenz's op-ed pieces have recently appeared in such media outlets as the Austin American-Statesman, El Paso Times, New York Times, San Antonio Express-News, and others.

== Education ==
Rogelio Sáenz earned his Ph.D. in sociology from Iowa State University in 1986. He earned his M.S. degree in sociology from Iowa State University in 1984, and his bachelor's degree in Social Work in 1981 from Pan American University (abolished to form the University of Texas Rio Grande Valley).
