= Dowell Myers =

American academic

Dowell Myers is a professor of urban planning and demography in the School of Policy, Planning, and Development, at the University of Southern California (USC). He directs the school's Population Dynamics Research Group, whose recent projects have been funded by the National Institute of Health, the Haynes Foundation, Fannie Mae Foundation, and the Ford Foundation.

== Education ==
Myers graduated from Phillips Exeter Academy in 1968. His undergraduate degree in anthropology from Columbia University was followed by a Master of Planning degree from the University of California, Berkeley. His Ph.D. is in urban planning from MIT and he also studied demography and sociology at Harvard University.

== Career ==
He leads the ongoing California Demographic Futures research project at USC. Recent applications have focused on the upward mobility of immigrants to the US and Southern California, trajectories into homeownership in the United States, changing transportation behavior, education and labor force trends, and projections for the future of the California population.

In 2000 he was a member of the Census Advisory Committee of Professional Associations (Population Association of America) for the United States Census Bureau and is the author of Analysis with Local Census Data: Portraits of Change (Academic Press, 1992).

In March 2007, the Russell Sage Foundation published his newest book, Immigrants and Boomers: Forging a New Social Contract for the Future of America. In that book Myers calls for a new social contract between the older and younger generations, based on their mutual interests and the moral responsibility of each generation to provide for children and the elderly. Immigrants and Boomers attempts to create a new framework for understanding the demographic challenges facing America and forging a national consensus to address them. Many Americans regard the massive influx of immigrants over the past 30 years with great anxiety, fearing new burdens and unwanted changes to the nation's ethnic, social, and economic identity.

Virtually unnoticed in the contentious national debate over immigration is the even more significant demographic change about to occur as the first wave of the Baby Boom generation retires, slowly draining the workforce and straining the federal budget to the breaking point. Myers in this book argues that each of these two powerful demographic shifts may hold the keys to resolving the problems presented by the other.

Dowell Myers has recently testified before the House Committee on the Judiciary about the reform of U.S. immigration policy.

== Honors and awards ==
In fall 2006, Dowell Myers was recipient of the Haynes Award for Research Impact that was issued on the occasion of the Haynes Foundation's 80th anniversary.

== Published works ==
- Immigrants and Boomers: Forging a New Social Contract for the Future of America, New York: Russell Sage Foundation. February 2007.
- Analysis with Local Census Data: Portraits of Change, New York: Academic Press, 1992; 15 chapters and 3 appendices.
- (editor), Housing Demography: Linking Demographic Structure and Housing Markets, Madison, WI: University of Wisconsin Press, 1990.
