= UK in a Changing Europe =

British foreign policy think tank initiative

- Director: Professor Anand Menon
- Website: ukandeu.ac.uk

The UK in a Changing Europe is a think tank intended to improve access to research on the relationship between the UK and the European Union (EU). It is funded by the Economic and Social Research Council (ESRC), and is based at King's College London. This funding ceased in April 2025.

== Description ==
UK in a Changing Europe is an independent research organisation created to communicate academic research on the UK's relationship with the European Union. The initiative is funded by the Economic and Social Science Research Council, which is part of UK Research and Innovation (UKRI).

UK in a Changing Europe is led by Director Anand Menon, Professor of European Politics and Foreign Affairs at King's College London. Its deputy directors are Professors Catherine Barnard and Paula Surridge, and the senior research fellow is Jill Rutter.

The organisation consists of nine senior fellows from across the UK, appointed in June 2019 to support the initiative. These include:

- Professor David Bailey
- Dr Meredith Crowley
- Professor John Curtice
- Professor Sarah Hall
- Professor Katy Hayward
- Professor Hussein Kassim
- Professor Nicola McEwen, co-director of the Centre on Constitutional Change.
- Professor Jonathan Portes
- Professor Meg Russell

The primary objective is to disseminate academic research in an accessible format to inform public and political debates on the UK's place in the EU. The first round of fellows concluded in January 2015. Funded academics are expected to work on projects to make their work accessible to the public, through activities such as blog posts and public events.

At the 2017 Think Tank of the Year Awards, The UK in a Changing Europe won the "one to watch" category, in 2018 it won the "best UK international think tank category", and in 2019 it won the "foreign affairs" category.

The initiative hosts regular events, open to the public, on a range of policy issues relating to UK-EU relations, including on Brexit and Trade, Brexit and Parliament, Brexit and the Island of Ireland, Brexit and the Media, Brexit and the Constitution, Brexit and Public Opinion. The initiative also hosts an annual conference.

== Research ==
In April 2016, the group published a report (in collaboration with Full Fact) titled "Leave/Remain: The Facts behind the claims" which fact-checked 24 claims made by both campaigns.

During both the 2017 and 2019 general election campaigns the initiative published reports, analysing and comparing the different claims and promises made about Brexit in each of the main party's manifestos – covering areas from citizens’ rights and immigration, through to defence and foreign policy.

== European Union membership referendum ==
The group has made several contributions to the debate over the UK's membership of the European Union. Members have written 'explainers' covering topics such as security, media coverage, and migration. They funded the report 'The EU Referendum and UK environment' released in April 2016. They have also collaborated with ITV News and Full Fact on a series of reports, and with the BBC's The World at One on short explainers. On 25 April 2016 they published a report (in collaboration with Full Fact) entitled 'Leave/Remain: the facts behind the claims' which checked 24 claims made by both campaigns and found both sides had made 'misleading' or 'unfounded' claims.

What UK thinks, a collaborative project run by NatCen Social Research, publishes a 'poll of polls' which has been used by several media outlets.
