= Roger Eatwell =

British academic

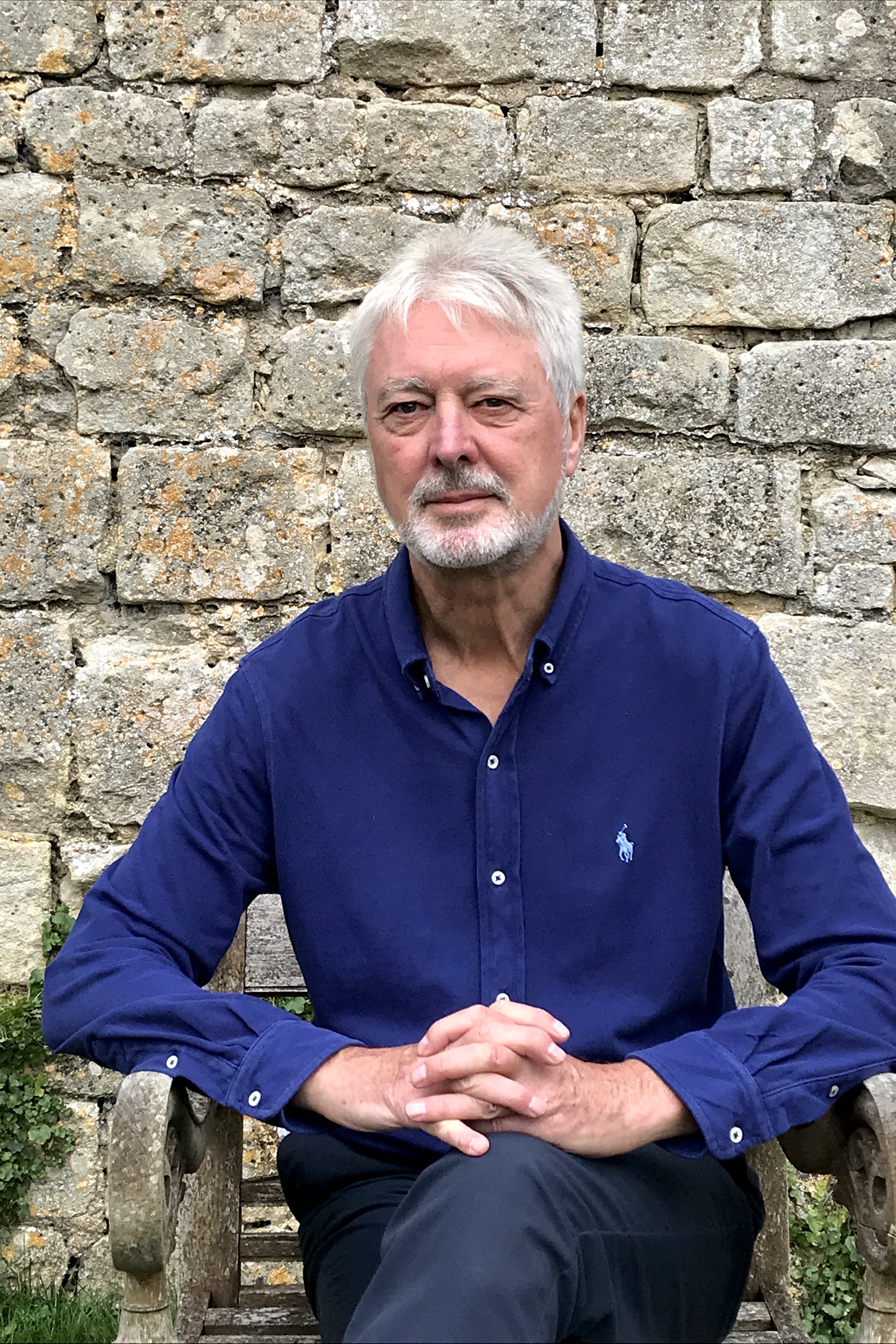
- Eatwell in 2018
- Born: 1949 (age 76–77)

Academic background
- Education: Balliol College, Oxford (DPhil)

Academic work
- Institutions: University of Bath
- Doctoral students: Matt Goodwin, Elena Korosteleva
- Main interests: European and American fascism, far-right, populism, and linked themes including the future of liberal democracy

Roger Eatwell (born 1949) is a British political scientist and Emeritus Professor of Comparative Politics at the University of Bath, specializing in the study of fascism, populism, far-right movements, and charismatic leadership. His scholarship emphasizes the syncretic nature of fascist ideologies and the structural factors driving populist revolts against established liberal democratic systems.

== Education and academic career ==
Eatwell studied Philosophy, Politics and Economics (PPE) at Balliol College, Oxford, where he completed his DPhil in politics. He joined the University of Bath in the late 1970s, building a career focused on comparative analysis of authoritarian and anti-system political phenomena. He currently holds the position of Emeritus Professor of Comparative Politics and Honorary Professor in the Department of Politics, Languages & International Studies.

His empirical approach draws on historical case studies and contemporary data to analyze the appeal of authoritarian leaders and the erosion of elite consensus in Western democracies. According to Google Scholar, Eatwell's work has been cited over 8,000 times, establishing him as a leading authority in his field.

== Research ==
=== Fascism studies ===
Since the late 1970s, Eatwell has engaged in research on fascism, developing an influential conceptualization of the ideology. He defines fascism as a syncretic ideology that attracted both the masses and intellectuals in some countries, and led elites to believe they could instrumentalize radical fascism.

==== Theoretical framework ====
Eatwell's model has three core elements:

1. The need to create a holistic nation that transcended social, economic, and political divisions
2. The forging of a "New Man" – an elite and people fervently committed to the nation
3. The construction of an authoritarian third way state that was neither communist nor capitalist

In his seminal 1992 article "Towards a New Model of Generic Fascism" published in The Political Quarterly, Eatwell introduced the "spectral-syncretic" model of fascism. This approach conceptualizes fascism not as a rigid doctrine but as a spectrum of positions (spectral) fused from contradictory traditions (syncretic), enabling adaptation to diverse national contexts while retaining core essences.

The model identifies fascism's essence through syntheses around four main themes: nationalism fused with statism, promoting an organic national community under a powerful, interventionist state; productivism blended with anti-materialism, advocating economic dynamism for collective glory over individual gain; elitism combined with populism, where a vanguard elite mobilizes the masses via charismatic leadership; and militarism allied with anti-liberalism, valorizing martial virtues while rejecting parliamentary pluralism and individualism. This formulation allows Eatwell to delineate fascism from conservatism, socialism, or mere authoritarianism, highlighting its revolutionary pretensions seeking a "third way" beyond capitalism and communism.

==== Fascism: A History ====
In his 1995 monograph Fascism: A History, Eatwell traces fascism's origins to an ideological crisis spanning the late 19th and early 20th centuries, positioning it as both a product of Enlightenment rationalism—through its faith in progress and state-directed modernization—and a reaction against liberal individualism and materialism. This dual character allowed fascism to synthesize disparate elements, appealing across social strata in nations experiencing rapid industrialization and national humiliation, such as post-World War I Italy and Germany. Eatwell argues that fascism's success stemmed from its ability to offer a vision of national rebirth amid perceived decadence, rather than mere opportunism or nihilistic violence.

The book became a comprehensive examination of the ideology, tracing its development and manifestations across different countries, and has been widely cited in subsequent fascism studies.

=== Populism and national populism ===
Eatwell has sought to distinguish fascism from both historic and contemporary populism. He argues that populism is based on three different core principles:

1. The need to respond to the popular will
2. A defence of the "plain people" (similar to the German concept of Volk)
3. A critique of self-serving liberal economic and political elites

==== The "4Ds" framework ====
In collaboration with political scientist Matthew Goodwin, Eatwell developed a theoretical framework for understanding contemporary "national populism." Their 2018 book National Populism: The Revolt Against Liberal Democracy was named a Sunday Times book of the year and has been translated into multiple languages including Greek, Lithuanian, Polish, Portuguese, and Spanish.

The book introduces the "4Ds" framework, identifying four long-run factors driving the rise of national populism:

- Distrust: Growing distrust of political elites in liberal democracies
- Destruction: Fears about the destruction of national and local communities through rapid demographic and cultural change
- Deprivation: Concerns about relative economic deprivation and fears for the future
- Dealignment: Growing dealignment from mainstream political parties

Eatwell emphasizes empirical evidence from electoral data, such as the 52% Brexit vote on 23 June 2016, and rising support for parties like France's National Rally (formerly National Front), which garnered 13.2 million votes (33.9%) in the 2017 presidential election. This model distinguishes national populism from historical fascism by highlighting its compatibility with democratic pluralism, absent the latter's cult of violence, totalitarianism, and economic corporatism.

==== Key findings on demographic change ====
Eatwell and Goodwin's research challenges simplistic explanations for populist support. The book rejects the popular view that Brexit was driven by "white people in all white areas where there are no immigrants," noting that areas like Boston in Lincolnshire, where more than 15% of the local population were born outside the UK, saw more than three-quarters of residents vote to leave the EU—the highest proportion in the country. The authors argue that it is not the actual number of immigrants, but the rate of change over time that matters: "Support for Brexit was stronger in areas that during the preceding decade had experienced rapid inward migration."

This analysis extends to Trump voters in the United States, for whom "living in areas where the proportion of Latinos had increased sharply" was a key predictor of support. The research demonstrates that rapid cultural or demographic change is a main factor in voting for national populism, which explains why many European countries traditionally held as international bastions of equality and social democracy are not immune from the trend.

=== Cumulative extremism ===
Eatwell has also written on the concept of "cumulative extremism," examining how one form of violence can spark another in a dangerous spiral. He has warned that if the current populist wave fades without addressing underlying concerns, it could leave many voters even more disillusioned, potentially increasing the risk of extremist movements.

His 2006 article "Community Cohesion and Cumulative Extremism in Contemporary Britain" explored these dynamics in the British context, analyzing how different forms of extremism can interact and reinforce each other. Although Eatwell's work on contemporary politics mainly focuses on parties that, unlike historic fascism, eschew violence, he has examined the potential for escalating cycles of political violence.

=== Charismatic leadership ===
Throughout his career, Eatwell has maintained a research focus on charismatic leadership and its role in mobilizing political movements. His work examines how "strong" leaders appeal to constituencies feeling alienated from mainstream politics and the future of democracy in an era of declining trust in traditional institutions.

His 2002 article "The Rebirth of Right-Wing Charisma? The Cases of Jean-Marie Le Pen and Vladimir Zhirinovsky" analyzed contemporary manifestations of charismatic leadership in right-wing movements, drawing on his theoretical work on fascism to understand modern phenomena.

== Editorial work ==
Eatwell has played a significant role in scholarly publishing on extremism and right-wing politics:

- Founder and Academic Editor, Themes in Right-wing Ideology and Politics series (Pinter Publishers, 1989–1994)
- Co-Founder and Academic Editor (with Cas Mudde), Extremism and Democracy series (Routledge, 1999–2019). At the time of standing down as co-editor on the series' 20th anniversary, 65 books had appeared or were under contract.

The Extremism and Democracy series became a leading academic book series examining various forms of political extremism and their relationship to democratic systems, publishing works by scholars from around the world on topics ranging from far-right movements to radical Islamism.

== Public engagement ==
Beyond his academic work, Eatwell has engaged extensively with public audiences on issues of populism and extremism. He has delivered lectures to secondary schools, discussing the distinction between populism and fascism and analyzing shifting attitudes towards politicians in the post-Brexit and Trump era. His talks address topics ranging from the role of new media in driving populism to the methods populist leaders use to mobilize support.

Mainstream parties, especially on the right, have sought to defuse the populist wave by adopting "populism-lite" policies, particularly relating to immigration—a phenomenon Eatwell and Goodwin have analyzed extensively.

== Selected publications ==
=== Books ===
- Eatwell, Roger; O'Sullivan, Noel (1989). The Nature of the Right: American and European Politics and Political Thought Since 1789. London: Pinter Publishers. ISBN 9780861879342.
- Eatwell, Roger (1995). Fascism: A History. London: Allen Lane. ISBN 9781844130900.
- Eatwell, Roger (1997). European Political Cultures: Conflict or Convergence?. London: Routledge. ISBN 1280319631.
- Eatwell, Roger; Wright, Anthony (1999). Contemporary Political Ideologies. London: Pinter Publishers. ISBN 9781855676060.
- Eatwell, Roger; Mudde, Cas (2004). Western Democracies and the New Extreme Right Challenge. London: Routledge. ISBN 9780415369718.
- Costa Pinto, Antonio; Eatwell, Roger; Larsen, Stein Ugelvik (2006). Charisma and Fascism in Interwar Europe. London: Routledge. ISBN 9780415419833.
- Eatwell, Roger; Goodwin, Matthew (2010). The New Extremism in 21st Century Britain. London: Routledge. ISBN 9780203859612.
- Eatwell, Roger; Goodwin, Matthew (2018). National Populism: The Revolt Against Liberal Democracy. London: Pelican. ISBN 9780241312001.

=== Selected articles and chapters ===
- Eatwell, Roger (1982). "Poujadism and Neo-Poujadism: From Revolt to Reconciliation". In Cerny, Philip G. (ed.). Social Movements and Protest in France. Pinter Publishers. pp. 70–93. ISBN 0861872142.
- Eatwell, Roger (1988). "Plus Ca Change?: The French Presidential and National Assembly Elections". The Political Quarterly. 77 (2): 462–472. doi:10.1111/j.1467-923X.1988.tb01229.x.
- Eatwell, Roger (1992). "Towards a New Model of Generic Fascism". The Political Quarterly. 59 (4): 161–194.
- Eatwell, Roger (1998). "The Dynamics of Right-Wing Electoral Breakthrough". Patterns of Prejudice. 32 (3): 3–31. doi:10.1080/0031322x.1998.9970263.
- Eatwell, Roger (2000). "The Rebirth of the 'Extreme Right' in Western Europe". Parliamentary Affairs. 53 (3): 407–425. doi:10.1093/pa/53.3.407.
- Eatwell, Roger (2002). "The Rebirth of Right-Wing Charisma? The Cases of Jean-Marie Le Pen and Vladimir Zhirinovsky". Totalitarian Movements and Political Religions. 3 (3): 1–23. doi:10.1080/714005489.
- Eatwell, Roger (2003). "Reflections on Fascism and Religion". Totalitarian Movements and Political Religions. 4 (3): 145–166. doi:10.1080/14690760412331329991.
- Eatwell, Roger (2003). "Ten Theories of the Extreme Right". In Merkl, Peter H.; Weinberg, Leonard (eds.). Right-Wing Extremism in the Twenty-First Century. Cass. pp. 47–73. ISBN 9780714651828.
- Eatwell, Roger (2006). "Community Cohesion and Cumulative Extremism in Contemporary Britain". The Political Quarterly. 77 (2): 204–216. doi:10.1111/j.1467-923x.2006.00763.x.
- Eatwell, Roger (2010). "The Nature of 'Generic Fascism': the 'Fascist Minimum' and the 'Fascist Matrix'". In Iordachi, Constantin (ed.). Comparative Fascist Studies: New Perspectives. Routledge. pp. 134–161. ISBN 9780415462228.
- Eatwell, Roger (2011). "Ideology, Propaganda, Violence and the Rise of Fascism". In Costa Pinto, Antonio (ed.). Rethinking the Nature of Fascism. Palgrave Macmillan. pp. 165–185. ISBN 9780230272958.
- Eatwell, Roger (2013). "Fascism". In Freeden, Michael; Sargent, Lyman Tower; Stears, Marc (eds.). The Oxford Handbook of Political Ideologies. Oxford University Press. pp. 474–492. ISBN 9780199585977.
- Eatwell, Roger (2013). "Fascism and Racism". In Breuilly, John (ed.). The Oxford Handbook of the History of Nationalism. Oxford University Press. pp. 573–591. ISBN 9780199209194.
- Eatwell, Roger (2014). "The Nature of 'Generic Fascism': Complexity and Reflexive Hybridity". In Costa Pinto, Antonio; Kallis, Aristotle (eds.). Rethinking Fascism and Dictatorship in Europe. Palgrave Macmillan. pp. 67–86. ISBN 9781137384409.
- Eatwell, Roger (2017). "Populism and Fascism". In Rovira Kaltwasser, Cristobal; Taggart, Paul; Ochoa Espejo, Paulina; Ostiguy, Pierre (eds.). The Oxford Handbook of Populism. Oxford University Press. pp. 363–383. ISBN 9780198803560.
- Eatwell, Roger (2018). "Charisma and the Radical Right". In Rydgren, Jens (ed.). The Oxford Handbook of the Radical Right. Oxford University Press. pp. 251–268. ISBN 9780190274559.
