= Daniel Trilling =

British journalist, editor and author

Daniel Trilling is a British journalist, editor and author. He was the editor of New Humanist magazine from 2013 to 2019. He writes about migration, nationalism and human rights and is the author of three books about European politics, including Bloody Nasty People: The Rise of Britain's Far Right. The publications he has written for include the New Statesman, The Guardian and the London Review of Books.

== Bibliography ==
- Bloody Nasty People: The Rise of Britain's Far Right (2013) Verso Books ISBN 9781781680803
- Lights in the Distance: Exile and Refuge at the Borders of Europe (2018)
- If We Tolerate This: How the British Establishment Made the Far Right Respectable (2026) ISBN 9781037411571
