= Raise the Colours =

Raise the Colours may refer to:

- Raise the Colours (organisation), flag-raising and anti-migrant vigilante group co-founded by Ryan Bridge and Elliott Stanley
- Operation Raise the Colours, campaign movement in the United Kingdom
