= Raise the Colours (organisation) =

British flag-raising and anti-migrant vigilante group

Logo of the organisation

Raise the Colours is a far-right group active in Great Britain whose members attach flags to lampposts and engage in anti-migrant vigilantism. It is one organisation behind Operation Raise the Colours, which gained attention in autumn 2025. The organisation was co-founded by Ryan Bridge and Elliott Stanley, businessmen from Birmingham and north Worcestershire. Stanley has disassociated himself from the group. Several members of the group are facing criminal charges and in November 2026, one was convicted of murder and of causing grievous bodily harm with intent.

Raise the Colours attached without permission Union and England flags to lampposts in Birmingham and Worcestershire, before expanding activities. Residents of areas where the group operates have experienced intimidation and aggressive behaviour. Some have organised to remove flags. In Stirchley, Birmingham, Raise the Colours have repeatedly replaced flags, leading to confrontations.

In late 2025, the group visited France, where members filmed themselves harassing migrants, stating that the "indigenous white population" is being "replaced in our own country". The group were joined by Danny Tommo. They appealed to "firms" of football hooligans to join anti-migrant actions. In January 2026, members of the group were banned from entering France. The group said it "does not support violence or any unlawful activity".

Bridge has been charged with 14 criminal offences in relation to incidents in Oxford, including racially aggravated harassment, threatening behaviour and assault, and with assault by beating in relation to an incident in Brighton. Bridge and two other men have also been charged with offences relating to an incident in Stirchley, Birmingham. Another member, Billy Allison, has been convicted of murder and of causing grievous bodily harm with intent following the death of one man and injury of another at a bar in Lichfield in May 2026. Group member Ben Cullen has been charged with making indecent images of children.

In June 2026 the High Court issued an injunction at the request of Oxfordshire County Council, and members of the group agreed to stop attaching flags to lampposts in Oxfordshire. In November 2026, Birmingham City Council was granted an interim injunction against Ryan Bridge, Ben Cullen and "persons unknown", with power of arrest should the court order be broken.

== Members ==
=== Founders ===
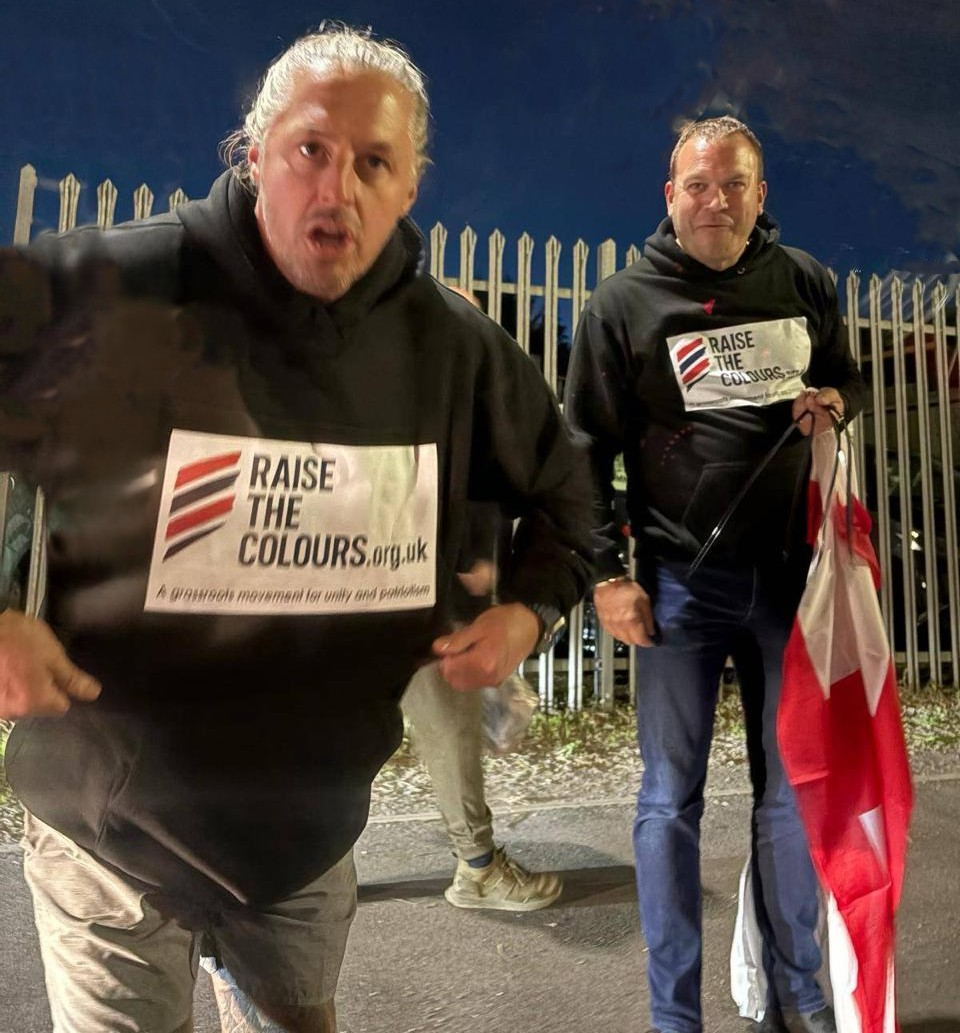
Ryan Bridge (left) and Elliott Stanley of Raise the Colours, in Stirchley

Raise the Colours was founded by Ryan Bridge and Elliott Stanley.

Ryan Bridge grew up in Birmingham and has said that he comes from a working-class family. He told the BBC that his grandparents had a tea service featuring the then Charles, Prince of Wales and Diana, Princess of Wales, "adding that people waved union jacks for a royal visit to Selly Oak, and as a cub scout he walked down the high street waving the same colours".

During a GB News interview, Bridge stated "We are normal, working class Birmingham businessmen". Bridge owns a house in Blackwell, Worcestershire that is reported to be worth £600,000. According to the Birmingham Mail, "[Elliott] Stanley's home address is a leafy crescent in Bromsgrove".

In October 2025, Bridge told the BBC that members of Raise the Colours are all fans of Birmingham City F.C. Bridge is associated with the Birmingham Zulu Warriors and has previously been arrested and banned from attending matches for three years as a result of violence involving Aston Villa and Manchester United supporters. According to advocacy group Hope Not Hate, Bridge has previously spoken of his fascination with the "violent side" of football as a teenager, describing the "fucking brilliant" fights as "the best buzz in the world… better than anything".

==== Business activities ====
Ryan Bridge has created a number of companies that operate in the area of compensation claims. These include Nationwide Personal Injury Specialists and UK Holiday Claims Ltd. The latter company was registered in 2016 but was dissolved two years later, with no accounts being filed. Around this time, Bridge was named by Spanish police as suspected of being involved in a scam that encouraged holidaymakers to submit false compensation claims, in return for a share of any proceeds from the claims. Messages were sent to holidaymakers using a WhatsApp group with the name UK Holiday Claims. A court instruction names Bridge amongst those who are alleged to have been involved in processing false claims of food poisoning. As of 3 October 2025, the case was awaiting trial.

Elliott Stanley is a former director of Sex Doll Official, which sold and rented out sex dolls. Stanley ran the company with his wife and teenage son from their home in Bromsgrove, but it failed during the COVID-19 pandemic. According to Birmingham World, the company provided "the industry's first rental service and [its] long list of customers included bereaved men who wanted a replica of their late partners". According to The i Paper in November 2025, Stanley "runs a tanning business".

=== Other members ===
Former Raise the Colours member Danny Tommo

According to Hope Not Hate reporting in January 2026, other members of the group have included "Angloid" (a pseudonym used by Lorcan Barker), who was described as "an 18-year-old ethnonationalist who regularly espouses the Great Replacement theory on X", and Ross Childs, "an anti-migrant activist who ran a flagging campaign in Lichfield" and who had "recently become active in the British far right, performing at Tommy Robinson's [2025] Christmas carol event". Danny "Tommo" Thomas was also a member of the group before falling out with Bridge and Stanley. Mark Keating was Raise the Colours' "head of security" and Julian Joseph Keane, who the group often called "JJ" or "Elon" and who in 2025 organised protests against the use of a hotel in Sutton Coldfield as accommodation for asylum seekers, "serve[d] mainly as RTC's driver". Other members of the group named by Hope Not Hate include Ben Cullen from Oxford, Jordan Wheatley from Stafford, and Billy Allison from Solihull. Other members who have been named in the media include Trudy Wells and Kevin Good.

=== Evolution of membership ===
In June 2026, The i Paper reported that "A number of faces that once appeared in Raise the Colours videos have disappeared from [its] broadcasts, which now primarily feature just Bridge". As well as noting that Danny Tommo had left the group, the paper reported that Bridge's co-founder, Elliott Stanley, "has not been featured in months". Former members told the paper that they had left due to the group's increasing extremism, with one saying that "I genuinely wish I had never entertained doing what we did because it hasn't worked out as we originally envisioned. It's a shame because it was something that was patriotic, but I'm even questioning what patriotism is now." The same member said that he started to become concerned when the group repeatedly put up flags in neighbourhoods where local people were opposed to them. Other former members interviewed by the paper claimed that "the group has become 'the Ryan Bridge show' and is about boosting his social media popularity", while others had become backers of Restore Britain.

The i Paper reported in June 2026 that "Bridge appears to be increasingly isolated, saying in one video that family members had told him they were glad he had been arrested and urging him to stop." The paper reports that while some previous members no longer appear in videos posted by the group on social media, "newer faces are appearing in their clips – including one man Bridge interviewed and spent time with in London and Shrewsbury, who has posted a video of himself on Instagram doing a fist-salute while holding a banner that reads 'Aryan Power' and a photo wearing a t-shirt with neo-nazi symbols, such as the Aryan Fist on."

In September 2026, the Birmingham Mail reported that co-founders Bridge and Stanley had apparently fallen out, having "a brief, hostile exchange" before a courtroom opened to consider Birmingham City Council's application for an injunction against members of the group. According to the newspaper, Stanley "said he now had nothing to do with Bridge and the Raise the Colours group and had not actively participated in its activities since February".

== Political stance and affiliations ==
The group has been classified as far-right and characterised as an anti-migrant vigilante and nationalist group. The Independent named the group as amongst a number of "far-right agitators" making trips to France to harass migrants waiting to cross the Channel. Le Monde called Bridge, Stanley and Tommo "far-right activists". The advocacy group Hope Not Hate has described Raise the Colours as part of "the far-right scene".

The group has denied that it is a far-right organisation and describes itself as a "grassroots movement for unity and patriotism". In early interviews with GB News, Stanley and Bridge denied that Raise the Colours campaign was politically motivated, with Stanley describing himself as a patriot and "centrist", not "right wing". "This is nothing to do with far-right movements", the pair told GB News. Stanley said that anyone characterising the pair's politics otherwise was "putting a target on our backs".

In November 2026, Jane Haynes of the Birmingham Mail wrote that earlier in the group's activities, Bridge had said that he did not have any political affiliations and had protested that "calling him 'far right’ or even ‘right wing’ was wrong". "Now, however", she wrote, "his tune had changed. The entire flagging movement has been about stopping the boats and opposing those who seek asylum via unsafe routes."

Bridge has stated that the British "right wing" needs to unite to oppose "the left". He has said that "We are the laughing stock of Europe and the world. We are getting more and more to be like a communist state....if you speak up or uncover the truth about the migrant situation...you are silenced."

In November 2026, Bridge told Jane Haynes that he had been receiving advice and the use of office space and equipment from Claire Bullivant of the Great British Political Action Committee, saying "they are great people, they have seen something in me and what I do".

=== Ryan Bridge's attendance at Reform UK conference ===
Ryan Bridge attended the Reform UK party conference in Birmingham in September 2026, while on police bail. He told The Guardian that he was not a member of Reform UK but had been invited to attend by the party. At an event at the conference, Bridge asked Nigel Farage "I would like to roll this out with you guys at Reform, and we have a legal and lawful way where we can raise flags in Reform council areas and do it the right way... Would you be happy to read my proposal and go forward?”, to which Farage replied, "I’ll give it to our lawyers. I can’t see why it shouldn’t be legal." Farage also told Bridge, "What your campaign has done is wake up vast parts of this country. If we can help you legally, we will." Hope Not Hate said: "That someone as extreme as Ryan Bridge was inside the Reform conference with a pass is genuinely shocking". Ben Quinn and Neha Gohil subsequently wrote in The Guardian that "Reform is facing questions about explicit links to the nationalist hard right" following Bridge's role at the party's conference.

In the wake of the conference, Bridge told The Guardian that he had received significant interest from Reform councillors and that the party was considering his proposal. He told the newspaper: "Specific councils are in acknowledgment of what we are trying to roll out and propose. It’s very, very positive from Clacton to Norfolk to Wales. Last night, I spoke to councillors in Burnley, it’s literally the whole country."

In November 2026, Jane Haynes wrote that his discussions at the Reform conference appear to have "triggered an awakening in non political Bridge, now a staunch Reform backer".

== Flag raising ==
The organisation has attached Union and England flags to lampposts in a number of suburbs in Birmingham and villages in Worcestershire, including Stirchley, Harborne, Moseley, Alvechurch, Barnt Green and Blackwell. Elliott Stanley stated in October 2025 that "We want to cover the city centre at some point". Attaching flags to lampposts without the permission of the relevant highways authority is not allowed and people doing so may be committing an offence.

A weather-tattered England flag originally attached to a lamppost by Raise the Colours, Cotteridge, Birmingham

The organisation's fundraising page states that "We are the founding members of this operation, which has taken off all over the UK", although there are a number of other individuals and groups that also claim to be the originators of Operation Raise the Colours, some of which use the same name. According to Hope Not Hate, Bridge and Stanley formed Raise the Colours "in response to a broader decentralised flagging movement begun by former English Defence League member Andy Currien". Stanley told the Telegraph in September 2025 that "I started the movement in south Birmingham and it's gone national and we have been doing it for a long time". Ryan Bridge has said that the flag raising originated with remembrance campaigns associated with the Royal British Legion and that the campaign initially "tagged on to the back of that". A Royal British Legion spokesperson quoted by the BBC said, "The Royal British Legion is a non-partisan organisation and is not affiliated with any flag-raising groups".

According to an article published on 3 October 2025 by the Birmingham-based online newspaper The Dispatch, when asked about how donations were being handled, Bridge told a reporter that he was registering the organisation with Companies House, though not under the name Raise the Colours. As of 1 November 2025, no such company had been registered. Raise the Colours Ltd was incorporated on 16 November 2026, though according to the Birmingham Mail, Bridge "has refused to divulge how many donations he’s received and whether it includes money sent by subscribers to the RtC Facebook channel".

Bridge told BBC Radio WM in February 2026, "Is it illegal putting an article up on a lamp-post? Maybe it is, maybe it isn't, but it makes us feel better".

Birmingham City Council has alleged that while raising flags, Raise the Colours members have engaged in "verbal abuse, including racial and sexist abuse", have made threats of violence, made malicious allegations, damaged property, and followed residents, uploading videos of them to social media "with the intention of intimidation and encouraging others to send abuse".

=== Community reactions ===
According to BBC News, some residents of Worcestershire villages where flags have been erected by Raise the Colours "said non-white people in the area felt scared to walk the streets", with one resident reported as stating, "Some people have been in tears because of the clear far-right racism that these flags represent." Ryan Bridge has responded that the flags have "nothing to do with the pigment in anyone's skin" and denies that the group's actions are motivated by racism. He told the BBC that he had "no regrets" over his actions with the group.

In some places, including the Birmingham suburb of Stirchley, local residents have organised to take down the flags, but Raise the Colours have returned multiple times to replace them using a cherry picker, leading to confrontations with locals. On one of these occasions, officers from West Midlands Police were called to the scene. Asked to stop the men putting flags up, a police officer stated "I understand tensions are running really high, but in the bounds of the law at the moment there isn't an offence". The police stated that they were attending to prevent a breach of the peace. Some local residents argued that the effect was that the police gave Raise the Colours an escort, and asked whether those removing flags would be given a similar "red carpet treatment". A video from the same evening, in which a local businessman argued with one of the group's members and told him "You're trying to intimidate good, hard-working people", went viral on social media. According to Maya Sall, writing for the New Statesman, "The clip raised Bridge's profile in an instant and triggered a game of algorithm-appeasing, shock-driven content. Overnight, Stirchley became the rage-bait capital of RTC; it was a feeding ground of caught-on-camera confrontations, guaranteed to spark virality."

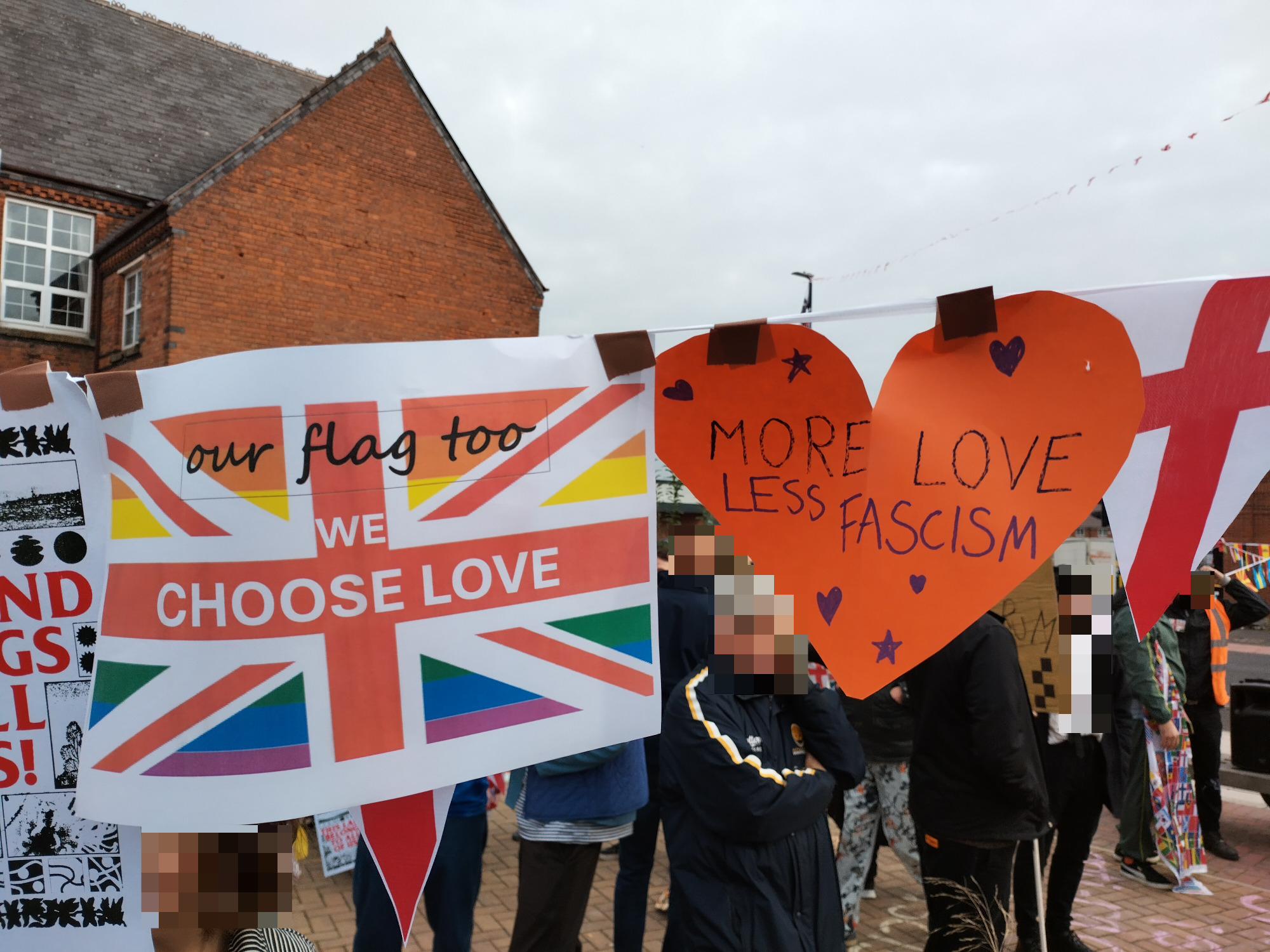
Signs added to flag bunting by participants at a community event organised to protest against racism and intimidation, Stirchley, Birmingham, 18 October 2025

Local businesses in Stirchley have reported experiencing intimidation and doxing from the group. In September, two businesses where customers had opposed flags being raised nearby were pelted with flour, eggs and condiments. According to a local newspaper, "locals suspect people connected to the flaggers [were] to blame". Raise the Colours posted on X about a third small business that objected to the flags, with their post being shared by Tommy Robinson and the business subsequently targeted by hundreds of negative reviews on Google. Supporters of the group printed posters featuring photos of residents who took down flags, accompanied by the text "I HATE THE UNION FLAG". On social media, supporters "jeer RTC on, accusing Stirchley of being infiltrated by a 'psyop' of paid 'antifa' protestors and 'dirty scum bag traitors'."

In late October, local Labour MP Al Carns issued a statement that he was "deeply concerned and disappointed" to learn of reports of intimidation. "These acts are wholly unacceptable and undermine the safety, security and well-being of our residents, visitors and workers", Carns said. Local councillor Mary Locke said, "The people here don't want this. We're welcoming and friendly. We're inclusive". Elliott Stanley stated, "I don't want anyone to be intimidated. I refute that. We're not trying to intimidate anyone at all".

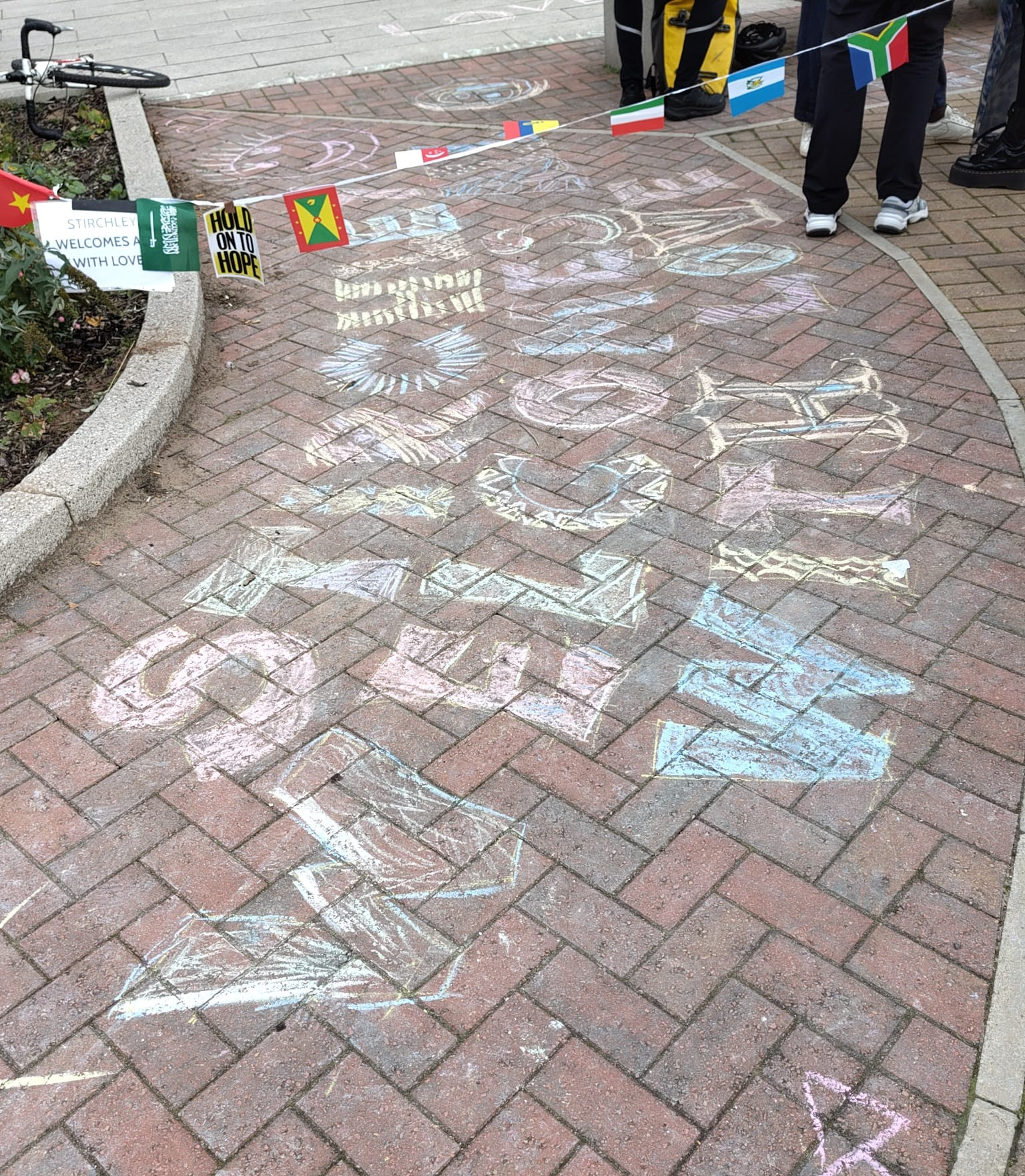
"Stirchley welcomes all with love" written in chalk on the pavement at a community anti-racism protest

At an October community event in Stirchley, organised to protest against the raising of the flags, Bridge, Stanley and other Raise the Colours members showed up, accompanied by Dale Hurd of the American Christian Broadcasting Network. Police were subsequently called to the event. Raise the Colours claimed on their social media that anti-flag protestors in Stirchley included "agitators from Antifa".

On 27 January 2026, a petition was presented to Birmingham City Council, calling on the council to act against flagging groups including Raise the Colours.

After an absence of several months, during which they were focused on migrants in northern France, Raise the Colours returned to Stirchley in late January 2026. According to The Dispatch, photos posted on social media "appeared to show the group's co-founder, Ryan Bridge, being barred from entering The British Oak Pub". On 4 February, the group put flags up in the Birmingham suburb of Moseley for the first time. According to the Birmingham Mail, the local councillor "tried to inform them that they are committing an offence under S132 Highways Act 1980 but they continued flagging". The police were called after "the group ignored calls to stop putting up the flags and roadside arguments broke out". On 6 February, "Moseley councillors said on Facebook that the council would be removing the flags in 'urgent' action, supported by West Midlands Police".

On 7 February, several hundred people took part in a 'Moseley Is For Everyone' event and took down the flags, on what was a rainy day. According to BBC West Midlands, approximately 150 people took part in the "de-flagging celebration". Reporting on 9 February, The Dispatch noted that "locals in Stirchley ... say they are organising en-masse to prevent disturbances in their community", with one local reporting that more than 200 people had joined a network resisting Raise the Colours' activities. Birmingham City Council subsequently stated that it was monitoring the situation regarding flag-raising activities in Moseley and Stirchley.

Responding to the removal of flags in Moseley, Bridge told the BBC "when we go to your Stirchley's and your Moseley's, they don't seem to approve – the white, middle class liberal areas don't really like it". According to the BBC, "more than half of [Moseley's] 21,000 residents [are] from a black, Asian or minority ethnic group.

Raise the Colours also posted videos on their social media accounts of members of the group arguing with residents of Harborne, where they had put up flags in October 2025. The video captions included "lefty gets schooled", "we are not the aggressors" and "Harborne lefties think being patriotic makes you racist". A spokesperson for Harborne Village Business Improvement District told the Birmingham Mail, "The installation of these flags was not authorised by the BID, the city council, or any organisation officially connected with the management of Harborne High Street. We would like to reiterate that Harborne is a welcoming and inclusive place for everyone who lives, works, shops and visits here".

After the flags in Harborne were removed, local councillor Jayne Francis responded, "Thanks to those responsible for removing. 99% of people who contacted me last week were uncomfortable with their presence (and were not asked if they wanted them)".

When the group were involved in raising flags in Oxford in March 2026, Oxford East MP Anneliese Dodds stated: "If people want to erect the England flag outside their own home that of course is their right. However that is not what has happened here, where it appears people who do not live in the neighbourhood were involved, who imposed themselves on the residents of Abingdon Road and disrupted traffic in the rush hour in the process."

In September 2026, Bridge posted a video of himself in Birmingham's Jewellery Quarter, in which a passing resident called him racist. According to the Birmingham Mail, "The verbal onslaught unleashed by Bridge in response included homophobic slurs and personal comments".

In November 2026, Jane Haynes of the Birmingham Mail wrote that Bridge had "allude[d] to death threats he has received from the 'ultra left'" and that he had showed her messages "that are certainly unpleasant - including an image of him with a noose that is especially vile". Haynes, who reports having received unpleasant messages herself after covering Raise the Colours, wrote that she had advised Bridge that the messages should be reported to the police.

=== Cultural responses ===
In Stourbridge in March 2026, a public artist gained permission from Dudley Council to fly 60 flags designed by students from a local college from lampposts on the town's ring road. The project, Hearts of Stourbridge, which was funded by the Arts Council England, celebrates "the identity, creativity and voices of Stourbridge's young people". According to the BBC, "Part of the mission is to combat negativity some had associated with the mass organisation of flying national flags without authorisation across town and cities in recent months", including by Raise the Colours, with the artist viewing it as "a response rather than a counter protest".

As part of the 2026 International Day of Birmingham festival in September, a Birmingham-based textile artist displayed Re-Union Jack, a large union flag made of worn and ripped polyester flags removed from lampposts in the city, sewn and stuck together by participants in a three-month community project, in Council House. The flag features signatures signatures of local figures, including a descendant of James Watt and members of bands Steel Pulse and UB40. The artist said that the project was a reaction to Raise the Colours' flag-raising, which "has caused division in communities across the country". She described the reimagined flags as "covered in the names of influential people in the Midlands who mean a lot to people and who make the Midlands this magical melting pot that we have". Ryan Bridge posted a video on social media calling the artwork "a disgrace" and accusing Birmingham City Council of stealing the flags from lampposts.

== Arrests and prosecutions following flag-raising ==
=== Prosecution of Ryan Bridge in Oxford ===
In March 2026, Bridge was part of a group who attached flags to lampposts on Abingdon Road in Oxford. According to the Oxford Clarion, "The videos posted by Raise the Colours show non-stop animosity between the flag team and local residents, pedestrians and cyclists". The Oxford Mail reported that Bridge said during his livestream of the action: "Oxford's mental, it's full of absolute lunatics who hate that flag, and hate the flag of their country". A local woman who questioned the group about why they were illegally raising flags said "There's a level of impunity there that is shocking. I've never experienced anything like it."

After Raise the Colours had visited Oxford to put flags up, the police opened an investigation into an incident which "allegedly involved a cherry picker blockading access in Abingdon Road on Tuesday evening, March 24 and residents being unhappy with the presence of those putting flags up". On 31 March, Raise the Colours returned to Oxford to put up more flags, in defiance of a formal legal notice requiring them to stop, which had been issued by Oxfordshire County Council.

During this second visit, the police arrested a 44-year-old man from Bromsgrove, "on suspicion of causing racially and religiously aggravated harassment, alarm or distress". The man was subsequently named by the press as Ryan Bridge. He was released on police bail. Bridge posted a video on Facebook following his release from custody, in which he said that his bail conditions included not visiting Oxfordshire. In September 2026, following a Thames Valley Police investigation, Bridge was charged with 14 offences alleged to have been committed across Oxfordshire between 31 January and 31 March. The alleged offences include seven counts of using threatening words or behaviour to cause harassment, alarm or distress; three of using threatening, abusive or insulting words or behaviour with intent to cause fear of, or provoke, unlawful violence; two of racially aggravated intentional harassment, alarm or distress; and one count each of racially aggravated fear of violence and common assault.

Bridge appeared in front of Oxford Magistrates' Court on 3 November, where he entered not guilty pleas. He is scheduled to appear at Oxford Crown Court on 3 December for a plea and trial preparation hearing in relation to incidents alleged to have taken place on 24 March. The charges for these alleged offences are three of racially aggravated harassment, one of common assault and one public order offense. Bridge was offered the choice between a trial at either Crown or Magistrates' Court for these alleged offences and opted for the former. He is also due to face two trials at Oxford Magistrates' Court in April 2027 – one in relation to six counts of using threatening words or behaviour to cause harassment, alarm or distress, scheduled for 12 April, and another trial on 21 April in relation to allegations of common assault and using threatening, abusive or insulting words or behaviour with intent to cause fear of, or provoke, unlawful violence.

=== Stirchley hit-and-run and arrests ===
On 14 May 2026, Raise the Colours returned to Stirchley to put flags on lampposts again, before being denied entry to one pub and going to another in the area. Later in the evening, a group of local residents met and started to take down the flags, when men wearing Raise the Colours clothing arrived and were, in the words of the residents, "really aggressive" and "seemed like they were really wanting to fight". One resident told The Guardian that she was punched by a man wearing a Raise the Colours hoodie. The Guardian reports that video footage taken by the woman "corroborated [her] account – and showed the same individual ripping off a face mask from another woman's face". The Birmingham Mail reported that footage showed "a man wearing a Raise the Colours hoodie and a mask aggressively walking up to people in the road and punching out at them, causing them to flinch. He then walks over to a woman at the side of the road and pulls down her mask."

On one video, the men from Raise the Colours can also reportedly be heard calling the residents a "fucking disgrace" and "traitors to your own country". On videos posted by Raise the Colours on social media, Ryan Bridge is heard shouting that he wants to "get immigrants out of our fucking country". According to The i Paper, in the videos, "Another man, wearing a balaclava and a jumper with the group's emblem, can be seen grabbing at the face covering of a woman who appears to be from an ethnic minority". One local resident was hit by a van that other residents reported had a Raise the Colours logo on. The collision happened on Mayfield Road, off the main Pershore Road that runs through Stirchley. The man was hospitalised with his leg broken in two places. West Midlands Police subsequently stated that "The van failed to stop at the scene but was recovered on nearby Prince Road and is now being examined". According to a video posted by Bridge on social media, the van was seized from the location of his business on 15 May.

A local group called Stirchley is For Everyone, which is composed of residents and business owners, referred to the night as one of "targeted violence and hospitalisations", and said that it marked a "dangerous escalation". The group said that they had faced months of "harassment, doxxing, and intimidation" from Raise the Colours and called on local MP, Al Carns, to help. "Despite consistent pleas from the community for intervention, residents feel they have been left to face this far-right aggression alone," the Stirchley is For Everyone statement said. A local resident told The Dispatch" that "for nearly a year now, we've felt like we've been under attack, we've been under siege", and suggested that people had been scared to report incidents involving Raise the Colours to the police, to walk along the high street and to use businesses in the area that had been targeted by Raise the Colours. Al Carns subsequently wrote to the acting chief constable of West Midlands Police, reporting that "his office had heard from 'dozens of residents' who had described incidents of harassment, intimidation and physical assault by members of [Raise the Colours]".

Ryan Bridge subsequently told the BBC that Stirchley had been "hijacked" by the "far-left". He denied knowledge of the incident with the van, adding that his group does not "condone any violence". Bridge referred to the evening as "just a normal Raise the Colours flagging mission...where the public look out for us and we're looking out for them". He called removal of the flags "an act of treason".

Two days later, Bridge was arrested while arriving in London to attend a Unite the Kingdom rally, on suspicion of wounding in relation to the Stirchley hit-and-run. According to The Dispatch, a video posted on the Raise the Colours Instagram had a "caption claim[ing] Bridge's wrist was broken" during his arrest, "but in videos posted since, both his arms appear to be fine". A second, 52-year-old man was arrested in Birmingham later the same day, also on suspicion of wounding. Both men were subsequently released on bail, under what the BBC termed "strict conditions". Bridge denies any wrongdoing. According to the Birmingham Mail, Raise the Colours member Julian Keane is under police investigation in relation to the incident.

The BBC subsequently reported that a French television documentary team had been present when Raise the Colours were putting flags up in Stirchley, though were "not present when the situation escalated in the evening". The French TV crew were also following the group when Bridge was arrested in London two days later. The community group Brummies United Against Racism and Hate Crime had been invited to participate in the documentary and stated that it had hoped that the film would show "the reality of Birmingham - communities standing together and peacefully refusing to be divided by hate", but after the incident in Stirchley it withdrew its participation, stating that "Raise the Colours anticipated opposition, sought confrontation, and that confrontation then became part of the production" and that "what may produce dramatic television can have serious consequences for communities already living under pressure and intimidation".

Referring to a button on the Raise the Colours website that allowed visitors to donate money to help communities feel "connected, energised, and united", comedian Stewart Lee wrote: "Hopefully the Stirchley man who was run over and hospitalised in May by a Raise the Colours van, after objecting to the group's intimidating tactics, feels suitably connected, energised and united. Nothing brings communities together more than putting on a Raise the Colours hoodie and live-streaming yourself hitting onlookers in the face."

On 16 November 2026, West Midlands Police announced that Mark Keating had been charged with four counts of assault by beating in relation to the Stirchley incident and is due to appear before Birmingham Magistrates Court on 9 December. Ryan Bridge has been charged with two counts of using threatening or abusive words or behaviour likely to cause harassment, alarm or distress, and will appear before magistrates on 10 December. The force also announced that a 53-year-old man from Sutton Coldfield who was arrested on suspicion of wounding in May remained on bail. The following day, it was announced that Julian Keane had been charged with causing serious injury by dangerous driving and had been bailed to appear at Birmingham Magistrates Court on 16 December.

== Injunctions ==
=== Oxfordshire County Council injunction ===
In June 2026 Oxfordshire County Council sought an injunction against the group to prevent them from raising flags on or near public highways. The council told the court that its contractors had met "with hostility and obstruction" when removing flags and also noted Bridge's arrest on suspicion of causing religiously and racially aggravated harassment in Oxford in April. The High Court heard the case on 23 June, granting an injunction against the unauthorised attachment of flags on or near public highways. The council had indicated that it also wanted an additional, specific injunction against four named members of Raise the Colours – Ryan Bridge, Ben Cullen, Trudy Wells and Kevin Good – but opted not pursue this when the four agreed to stop attaching flags to lampposts in Oxfordshire and "also agreed not to encourage others to put flags up, and not to obstruct any council worker or contractor taking them down". Bridge stated that the injunction was "horrendous" and that Oxford was "completely finished", saying "We haven't had the result we wanted today, because we want to be able to put up flags of our country wherever we like". Reform UK MP Richard Tice accused the Liberal Democrats, who control the council, of hating patriotism and England. The council leader stated that "We are very explicitly not about banning people who want to fly the flag on their own private property. We fly the flag on our own council buildings and we're very proud to do so".

The injunction was confirmed as permanent by the High Court on 9 July. The judge noted in his judgment that Cullen was "accused of serious criminal offences relating to possession of child pornography", which he had denied, and that Bridge told the hearing that the group "knew nothing about the child pornography allegations".

Reports that were submitted to the High Court as part of the case included allegations that Ben Cullen had headbutted a highways worker; that highways workers now had to wear unbranded uniforms and drive unbranded vehicles and cover their faces for fear of being attacked; that Raise the Colours supporters had spat at streetlight maintenance workers; that Cullen and Trudy Wells had posted details of council depots online; and that the group had attached trackers to highway workers' vehicles, using them to find out their home addresses, which were then posted online.

After the news of the Oxfordshire injunction, some residents of areas of Birmingham where Raise the Colours have put flags up argued that Birmingham City Council and West Midlands Police were "dragging their heels" about pursuing a similar injunction covering Birmingham. A Birmingham Green Party councillor told The Guardian that the council was in a "quagmire" over the issue but that "There's a huge amount of evidence of the aggressive, intimidating, violent behaviour of Raise the Colours and that is being used to request an injunction against that organisation".

=== Birmingham City Council injunction ===
On 26 August 2026, Birmingham City Council applied to the High Court for an injunction to prevent Ryan Bridge, Elliott Stanley, Julian Keane, Ross Child, Billy Allison, Ben Cullen, Mark Keating and "persons unknown" from putting up flags, as part of its "ongoing work to manage unauthorised attachments on the highway, including flags, banners and signage". The Birmingham Mail reported that "In its submissions to the court, the council will say it had witnessed incidents that involved harassment, intimidation or obstruction during removal activity". The council stated that it was pursuing an injunction as a "last resort" after it had "sought voluntary compliance" from Raise the Colours without success.

In documents filed with the court by Birmingham City Council, it stated that its highways contractor Kier Group was "no longer willing to deploy operatives for [removing flags] due to concerns regarding health and safety" owing to threats and intimidation. The council's Director of Highways and Infrastructure stated that the council could not afford the amount quotes by an alternative contractor and that paying this cost would divert resources from other, vital tasks. The manager of the council's community safety partnership stated that the council was not "taking sides" but that when opposed or questioned, Raise the Colours "respond with aggression, intimidation and, in some cases, violence....this has resulted in many people feeling unsafe in their own homes and increased tension within local communities". He confirmed that the council was also seeking to prevent the attachment of Palestinian flags, as had happened in parts of the city. The documents also included a statement from West Midlands Police that flagging activity had "created a sustained and disproportionate demand upon [our] resources".

The group Brummies United Against Racism and Hate Crime welcomed the news of the injunction application and said that it had been assisting the council in collating evidence of Raise the Colours members' "thuggish behaviour". Local Reform UK councillors criticised the council's actions. Ryan Bridge called the council's evidence and the witness statements submitted to the court "99 per cent lies" and said that "The majority of people here (in Birmingham) are pro flag and pro British, and you can see the love I get. It's that horrible 5 per cent, the liberal middle class left, who object and say not in my neighbourhood".

After it was reported that the council was applying for an injunction, false claims circulated on social media that the council was seeking an outright ban on the flying of national flags. Elon Musk called the council "traitors". A council spokesperson told Reuters "We are not stopping people flying flags on their property".

The High Court in Birmingham sat on 8 September, 30 September and 2 November to consider the application for an injunction. Prior to the first hearing, "there was a brief, hostile exchange between Bridge and Stanley, who had co-founded Raise the Colours before apparently falling out". Keating and Childs did not attend. Allison appeared briefly by video link from custody as he was awaiting trial for murder; he chose to leave the room he was appearing from before the judge spoke to him and did not appear again during the injunction hearings. Cullen contacted the council to indicate that he did not want to participate or to raise flags again in Birmingham". Bridge, Stanley and Keane indicated that they were willing to make legal undertakings not to participate in further flagging in the city. The council's barrister said that the authority was willing to accept these undertakings from Stanley and Keane but not at that stage from Bridge. According to the Birmingham Mail, at the first hearing, the judge "appeared to criticise the council for not clearly setting out the case against each of the seven named men".

New paperwork submitted to the court by Birmingham City Council ahead of the second hearing stated that "The authority is of the view that the behaviour, for which there is no lawful basis, will, if not prevented by way of an injunction, continue to escalate. It is highly likely that such behaviour will ultimately lead to serious injury or death, and further disruption to and division within its local communities." The council reiterated its intention that the injunction would apply to flags of all types, not just Union and St George Cross flags.

The council's paperwork highlighted a number of incidents as evidence against Bridge, including that he and other Raise the Colours members filmed and shouted "eat your pizza you greedy pig" at a woman in a restaurant who had objected to them putting up flags in Moseley, that he called opposing his actions "traitors" and mocked their appearance, speech and other traits, that the group's cherrypicker was parked on double yellow lines, blocked pavements and obstructed pedestrians and traffic, and that in Stirchley, "a member of the public suffered a broken leg following a collision with the cherry picker used by the defendants to install flags". The council also noted that after being served with court papers before the first hearing, Bridge had recorded himself saying "I ain’t giving up, I ain’t stopping, I ain’t doing Oxford on this one". The council stated that this demonstrated that Bridge did not intend to abide by the proposed injunction.

At the third hearing on 2 November, Bridge's lawyer told the court that that putting up flags was an expression of Bridge's political views that should be regarded as protected by the European Convention on Human Rights (ECHR). He argued that "An expression of article 11 [of the ECHR] will inevitably involve some disruption. The authorities do have to tolerate that to some extent". The council's lawyer argued that there were "other ways" that Bridge could protest without attaching flags to highway infrastructure and that the evidence against Bridge demonstrated that there was "significantly more" activity than Bridge admitted to.

On 18 November, the judge issued her written decision, granting Birmingham City Council an interim prohibitory injunction banning Ryan Bridge, Ben Cullen and "persons unknown" from attaching flags to public infrastructure without permission and granting power of arrest should Bridge or "persons unknown" break the order.

Upon issuing her judgment, the judge noted the "very emotive language" that had surrounded the case and stated: "The interim injunction needs to be understood for what it is. It is not the Court nor the (council) ‘banning the Union Jack’ or the display of Pride flags or anything of the like. Whilst the interim injunction order will cover flags of all types, it is limited in scope to the restraint of unauthorised flags attached to highway street furniture or infrastructure, and to the restraint of associated conduct, within the administrative area of Birmingham. There are many different ways in which flags of all types can still be displayed in Birmingham." The judge stated that concerns that the injunction would unduly restrict free expression were "unwarranted".

Addressing the submissions made by Adam Biggs and Mark Hudson, representing "persons" unknown, the judge wrote that these "were both articulate and passionate" but clarified the scope of the injunction: "However, many of the concerns they expressed about not being able to fly flags from their homes or walking down the highway wearing t-shirts with Pride flags are unfounded. The proposed order would not prevent such behaviour. Similarly, it would not prevent the ‘missing cat’ type of notice being attached to a street lamp, as it is not a flag."

After the announcement of the granting of the interim injunction, Ryan Bridge posted a video on Facebook, saying that he was "gutted" and "devastated" by the decision, including the granting of powers of arrest. He said that Raise the Colours was "not about race, colour, creed" but about opposing "illegal invaders breaking in our country, jeopardising our borders, on the rubber dinghies". He said that he was considering an appeal against the judgment.

The council's cabinet member for equalities, communities and social justice, Jane Baston of the Green Party, welcomed the decision. Robert Alden, leader of Birmingham's Conservative Party councillors, criticised the council's decision to apply for the injunction. The Reform UK leader on the council, Jex Parkin, said the council had its "priorities entirely wrong". Brummies United Against Racism and Hate Crime welcomed the judgment.

The day after the judgment had been issued, a follow-up hearing was held. Bridge attended without his barrister, who the court was told was working on another case in London. The judge asked Bridge "Why did you not tell your barrister on November 10 that the hearing was today?" and said that "I'm lost at why your barrister is accepting other work". Bridge was told that the interim injunction had now come into force and would remain in place until a trial took place or there was a further court order. Bridge was told that if the council sought to make the injunction permanent, the trial could take three to fours days, and he responded that "It's spiralling out of control, isn't it?", adding that he did not "want to exploit any more of the public purse and the council's money". The judge said that the court would encourage the parties to the case to reach a resolution without the need for a trial.

Bridge asked for clarification on what was meant by "encouragement", relating to the injunction prohibiting him from encouraging others to attach flags to street furniture, telling the court "If I say 'your flag looks nice' I could be encouraging somebody and go to jail for two years". The judge responded by that the word "encourage" was routinely included in injunctions and that she was not willing to go over the wording any further with Bridge, stating "It's everyday expressions in the English language". Bridge said: "Because they're everyday words, it's quite worrying for me and everyday people."

At the post-judgment hearing, the judge also reiterated that the injunction was "not the court nor the claimant 'banning the union jack' or the display of Pride flags or anything of the like" and that while it applied to all types of flag, it only related to those attached without authorisation to street furniture.

== Other arrests and prosecutions of members ==
=== Conviction of Billy Allison ===
On 28 May 2026, Raise the Colours member Billy Allison appeared at Stafford Crown Court, charged with murder and grievous bodily harm with intent, in relation to an incident in Lichfield on 24 May, in which two men were punched at a bar, with one of them, Matthew O'Gara, dying in hospital two days later. Allison appeared at Stafford Crown Court by video link from HM Prison Dovegate again on 1 September, when he entered pleas of not guilty for the charges of murder and grievous bodily harm with intent. His trial started on 28 October. He admitted the alternative charges of manslaughter and inflicting grievous bodily harm, denying that he did so intentionally. On 18 November, the jury found him guilty of the murder of O'Gara and of causing grievous bodily harm with intent to the other man.

During the trial, the jury were not told about Allison's links to Raise the Colours, but the court was told that he had been drinking spirits with friends including Ryan Bridge and Ben Cullen and their partners for several hours and had been taking cocaine throughout the day. Raise the Colours members had been invited to the bar, Ricco and Loren, by its owner, who had also arranged accommodation for them to stay overnight in Lichfield. Shortly before Allison's attack on him, O'Gara had shaken Bridge's hand on the bar's dancefloor, which the prosecuting barrister described as "A handshake that Matthew O'Gara crossed the bar and dancefloor to make, but one that it seems Ryan Bridge did not particularly welcome". The barrister told the jury that Allison and Bridge had then exchanged words before Allison put down his glass and then "quietly and cowardly attacked [O'Gara] from behind", with a "fist like a sledgehammer".

The prosecution told the court that the sound made by Allison's punch was loud enough to be heard over the sound system in the bar and resulted in several bones in O'Gara's neck being broken and a split artery. It was described as being delivered with the "stance and skill of an experienced fighter". The second man, Adam Cooper, suffered a fractured eye socket and nose. After the attack, Allison is reported to have fled the bar through a back door with Ben Cullen, who he subsequently swapped T-shirts with. The pair then went to the hotel where Cullen was staying, where Allison was arrested by police at around 05:00.

Upon being told of the jury's verdict, Allison left the dock without the permission of the judge. His sentencing is due to take place on 5 January 2027. After Allison had left the dock, the judge said "I can't say this to the defendant's face but he is under an obligation to attend [the sentencing hearing] in person. If he refuses to I will sentence him in his absence."

When asked by a journalist about Allison's conviction on the day that the jury reached their verdict, Bridge stated "That’s complete slander. It was nothing to do with Raise the Colours."

=== Prosecution of Ben Cullen ===
In July 2026, Raise the Colours member Ben Cullen appeared in court in Reading, charged with making 22 indecent category A photographs, including one moving image, 36 indecent category B pseudo-photographs and 20 category C images of children. Cullen denied the charges. The court postponed the trial, with a provisional new date of June 2027, due to one of the jurors being discharged.

Raise the Colours issued a statement saying that "Raise the Colours wishes to make clear that we were not aware, and have never previously been aware, of the allegations reported concerning Ben Cullen (Raise the Colours Oxfordshire). This is the first time we have learned of the matter." The statement continued that Cullen "was not affiliated with Raise the Colours" and that while members of the group may have put flags up with Cullen, "this does not mean he represented, was part of, or was affiliated" with Raise the Colours.

Writing in the New Statesman, Maya Sall states that "Bridge denies any connection to [Allison and Cullen], but photos of them together remain on RTC's social media. In one, Bridge, Allison and Cullen pose with an image captioned 'RTC family's coming together and showing support'." The Birmingham Dispatch noted that there was "a litany of pictures showing Ryan Bridge at dinner with Ben Cullen, on marches (wearing RTC merch) with Ben Cullen, and in the airport with other activists — and Ben Cullen. Oh, and don't forget Oxfordshire county council's legal case against Cullen and his Raise the Colours chapter. Alongside Ben Cullen, who was named in the council's injunction against RTC, and who was with him in the dock at the High Court, agreeing that he would no longer affix the St George flag to the county's lampposts? Well that would be none other than… Ryan Bridge!"

== Anti-immigration stance ==
Ryan Bridge has stated that the main aim of Raise the Colours is to "stop illegal immigration". Prior to co-founding the group, Elliott Stanley had previously been involved in protests outside a hotel housing asylum seekers in Solihull in summer 2025.

Interviewed about his participation in the hotel protests, Stanley said that "I'm talking about people who have paid thousands of pounds to get here and are being put up in a hotel who are here illegally and we don't know who they are. ... I'm not going to be ashamed of going to a protest". An anti-racist campaigner said of Stanley's participation: "This is a political movement, led by people who hate migrants. Now we can see that Elliott Stanley was part of the summer protests aimed at targeting and scapegoating migrants. What people like him refuse to accept is that many people do not hold with their political views and not everyone wants their neighbourhoods covered in flags".

The organisation has put up flags with "Unite the Kingdom" text on – a reference to a rally in London organised by Tommy Robinson – and banners reading "Stop the Boats". The group was responsible for unfurling a Union flag with "Unite the Kingdom" written on it over the White Cliffs of Dover in September 2025. The group also let off red and blue flares and held signs that read "Stop the boats" and "RIP Charlie Kirk". Bridge was quoted by the Telegraph as stating: "Regarding Charlie Kirk, he was a patriot of his country, we're a patriot of ours and he's got [sic] Christian beliefs, we live in a Christian country. We just like the way he stood up for his country so we thought we would pay tribute to him on the day we unveiled the White Cliffs of Dover flags".

On 29 July 2026, members of Raise the Colours joined members of the group 'Bristol Rises' to briefly hang two large flags from the south side of the Clifton Suspension Bridge in Bristol. Both flags had Raise the Colours' website address on them, with one also including the message "stopping the boats" and the other "protecting our women and children". The activists were quickly told to remove the flags by security guards, and the chair of the Clifton Suspension Bridge Trust Said "The Clifton Suspension Bridge is here for everyone to enjoy, and the hanging of flags and banners causes a potential health and safety risk to pedestrians and vehicles crossing the bridge."

In October 2026, Ryan Bridge and other members of Raise the Colours walked to the summit of Yr Wyddfa with union flags. Asked by a group of medical students who were also walking to the summit what message he was displaying, Bridge responded that it read "Stop the boats and the illegal invasion of our country". He also shouted "stop the boats". On a video posted on Raise the Colours' social media, one walker said to Bridge, "Everyone is coming up here, having a nice day and you are here spreading hate speech. Why does everyone else have to deal with that?".

== Anti-migrant vigilantism ==
Historian of the British far-right Nigel Copsey stated that in late 2025, several Raise the Colours members "shifted from symbolic 'flagging' to extra-territorial vigilantism along the Normandy coast". In November, members of Raise the Colours visited Gravelines. From there, Ryan Bridge filmed content for the organisation's social media pages, in which members of the group waded into the sea, "shouting at migrants boarding dinghies" and "speak[ing] in soundbites about the 'hundreds of thousands of undocumented men' committing 'murders', 'gang rapes' and the 'indigenous white population' being 'replaced in our own country'".

The group called for volunteers to help with vigilante action against migrants, stating: "Our country is doing nothing. Weak government, weaker borders. They are doing nothing so we need to make a stand boys". This call included reference to "firms", which The i Paper explained is "a phrase that refers to football hooligan groups". The i Paper reported that the group's recruitment efforts "involve pumping out a high volume of videos filmed in France of their confrontations with those in the Calais camps". Other clips "showed two men saying they were taking matters of illegal migration into their own hands and filming themselves stamping on and smashing a small boat's engine". Some non-governmental organisations (NGOs) supporting asylum seekers in northern France "say that the dinghies had already been abandoned in sand dunes when Raise the Colours found them". Amongst those members of the group that travelled to France with Bridge was Billy Allison.

On subsequent visits to France, Bridge was joined by Tommy Robinson associate Danny "Tommo" Thomas, who has a conviction for attempted kidnap and who has been described as "undoubtedly a far-right individual, with a well-established position within the British far-right scene". On one trip, Bridge and Danny Tommo travelled to Paris, where they filmed themselves harassing homeless migrants sleeping on the streets, posting the videos on the Raise the Colours social media pages. According to The i Paper, in the videos "the men repeat several claims commonly used by the far right, such as saying that migrants entering the UK illegally are all 'rapists and murderers… coming to a town near you'". In one video, filmed from their car, the pair "accuse one of the migrants of holding a knife – despite his hands being empty – and make him stand back from the car window". The men also made "a number of unsubstantiated claims and conspiracies informed by their short time in France, including stating gangs are not involved in the movement of migrants over the English Channel". A researcher from Hope Not Hate responded to the footage by saying: "Their behaviour normalises the idea that it is acceptable to approach black and brown people and question them on their residential status, or their travel plans, in the name of 'patriotism'. The fact that they are not only doing these things themselves, but actively encouraging others to do the same, is very concerning".

Bridge, Tommo and Elliott Stanley are reported to have met over lunch in a pub on Monday 17 November to discuss what they called on social media "Operation Overlord" (echoing the codename for the Allied invasion of occupied Europe in June 1944). Another customer who overheard their conversation and recognised them from previous media coverage told an i Paper reporter that "Thomas got his phone out and showed the others a Tommy Robinson demo", referring to a march organised by Robinson. "I heard [Tommo] say, 'if you look at the number of people here, and if you take out all the women and children…' They only wanted men involved". The source also told the paper that the group "were planning to do something on the coast... They wanted to set up shifts going backwards and forwards across the Channel" and that Stanley had mentioned the need to buy a "decent boat", suggesting they could get "what was needed for £35,000". Bridge, Tommo and Stanley also reportedly "discussed needing 'some sort of diversion', and appeared to talk about how to evade police while making their actions 'public and visible'", with one of them reportedly stating "The police will be looking in that direction, and then it'll be, 'boom' and we'll be off in the other direction".

After being contacted for comment by the newspaper, the group reportedly "appear to have moved their plans forward", undertaking the trip on Friday 28 November, "putting the accelerated timeline down to weather conditions". On the morning of their trip to France, Tommo shared a photo of himself and Bridge on social media, which showed them wearing a mock military-style outfits with Union flag patches, accompanied by the caption "#OperationOverlord Incoming". According to Searchlight, the group posted a video filmed by Bridge of him and Tommo fleeing a refugee camp in France. In the video, Bridge and Tommo "[shout] abuse at migrants in a camp" and the video "concludes with Bridge panting and out of breath having run a short distance to a waiting getaway car after a water bottle is thrown at them on camera".

On 5 December 2025, Bridge, Tommo and a third activist visited northern France again, "targeting migrants for harassment and searching for dinghies buried in sand dunes to destroy". They livestreamed a walk around Dunkirk, during which they accused members of Médecins Sans Frontières (MSF) of supporting an "invasion" of the UK by migrants. According to MSF's local coordinator, an MSF car was followed by Bridge and two other men in a British-registered car, and when the MSF members parked, the Raise the Colours members approached them, verbally abused them and tried to prevent them from closing their car door when they got back into it. Earlier in the day in Gravelines, the Raise the Colours group had confused journalists for members of an NGO, claiming that they helped migrants reach the UK illegally, that those migrants committed murders and that it was members of the NGO who were smugglers. One French association that works with migrants reported Raise the Colours to the police, noting that members of the group "were detained for several hours before being released". The association stated that it had "been monitoring the social media accounts of these various groups daily and reporting them to the public prosecutor and prefecture. However, even though we hear our alerts are taken seriously, to date nothing has been done to prevent them from coming to the beaches along the coast. When the far right advances unchecked, human rights erode". Nine French associations subsequently issued a statement condemning the UK and French governments for "encouraging violent and xenophobic practices" by failing to stop anti-migrant activists engaging in vigilantism on the French coast.

In one video posted on social media, a French police officer asks members of the group whether they have a press pass. When the group visited France again the following week, videos show Bridge "brandishing what appears to be a homemade press card printed out on white paper". In one video, Bridge "asks a migrant if he would be interviewed, falsely telling the man he is 'from the press association'", and later "from 'a press association called Raise the Colours'". In one video, a member of Raise the Colours asks whether a migrant wants to be interviewed in exchange for money: "Do you want to speak to us for money? Do you want some money? Do you want some euro?".

During Raise the Colours' visit to France on 5 December 2025, the police were called. Tommo and two other Raise the Colours members said that they were arrested, with their passports seized by French authorities. They were apparently later released without charge. Members of aid groups attempted to report Raise the Colours to their local prefecture, but said "It seems like they are waiting for something bad to happen before they press charges of direct violence". MSF announced in March 2026 that they had filed a complaint of defamation against Raise the Colours in relation to claims three of the group's members made on 5 December.

Amongst the members who joined Bridge, Stanley and Tommo on visits to France were Billy ALlison and "Angloid". On one of the group's visits to France, Raise the Colours were joined by former Chelsea Headhunters leader Jason Marriner.

The group said on social media that 5,500 people had offered to travel to France to "stop the boats". It "circulated appeals for stab-proof vests, plate carriers, high-powered torches, thermal cameras, drones and encrypted radios" and called itself a "true professional civilian border control force, ready to take control of the beaches". Journalist Sanya Burgess wrote that the group's claims about having recruited 5,500 people to engage in vigilantism contrasted with "there not being a large amount of traction online around their chosen hashtag '#OperationOverlord'". Data analysed by the Institute for Strategic Dialogue showed that the hashtag's daily peak was around 4,800 mentions on 28 November, when the group first used it, dropping to only 100 posts on 1 December.

Bridge and Tommo launched a website for their "Operation Overlord" campaign in late November, but according to The Independent, the website no longer appeared to be live as of 10 December 2025. At the time of setting up the website, Raise the Colours announced that they would be holding a conference on 24 January 2026, describing it as "an opportunity to meet fellow Patriots, discuss upcoming plans and listen to YOUR ideas". The group circulated a form to vet people in order to block "lefties" and "people who are MI5". The group stated that 25,000 sign-ups had been reached within a week and that the conference would attract more than 500 attendees. According to The i Paper on 15 January 2026, "The conference was quietly cancelled last week, and the group's original social media post advertising it has now been deleted". The newspaper also reported that "Analysis of their sign-up website also shows it was visited only around 14,400 times since its launch on 4 December until 14 January, making the claim of 25,000 sign-ups highly improbable".

=== Ban from entering France and split with Danny Tommo ===
In early January 2026, it was reported that French authorities were considering arresting members of the group on charges of obstruction and aggravated violence. A source close to French interior minister Laurent Nuñez told local newspaper La Voix du Nord that Nuñez had "requested that the members of these groups be identified, apprehended in case of action, and that measures to hinder them be considered".

On 14 January, the French interior ministry announced that 10 British nationals "identified as activists within the movement and having carried out actions on French soil", belonging to the "far-right", had been banned from entering or residing in the country. The interior ministry stated "Our rule of law is non-negotiable. Violent and hate-inciting tactics have no place in our territory". Raise the Colours said in a statement it had always maintained that its activities must remain peaceful and within the law and it "does not support violence or any unlawful activity". The names of the 10 people who were banned were not released but a spokesperson for Raise the Colours stated that the group was "aware of public statements made today by the French interior ministry referring to administrative measures relating to certain individuals identified as members of Raise the Colours. At the time of issuing this statement, no formal notification has been received by Raise the Colours regarding any administrative measures. We understand that the statements refer to administrative decisions concerning specific individuals, rather than the organisation as a whole".

Raise the Colours subsequently announced that Tommo had "chosen to step away" from the group, but according to The i Paper, Danny Tommo "denied this on his own social media account, saying "we are just getting started"". Diane Taylor wrote in The Guardian that "They do not appear to have parted on good terms". According to Sanya Burgess, "A disagreement appears to have been rumbling before news of the ban". Burgess said that "The two sides clashed over the speed of efforts to bring an army of men to France, and over the level of acceptable risk that any trip may escalate into violence".

According to Searchlight, after the split, Tommo published a video in which he explained that he had asked Ryan Bridge not to put out a statement about his departure from the group, saying "No, they decided to put a statement out, which then made the left start putting bloody news reports about me, saying 'Danny Tommo has left the movement'". Tommo also said that "Ryan Bridge threatened me tonight that he would ruin me, whatever that means, if I came on here and cleared the mess that he created yesterday". Searchlight reported that Tommo alluded to a split over the future direction of Raise the Colours, with Bridge wanting to set up structures, organise training courses and conferences, whereas Tommo described himself as "someone that needs stuff to happen now". "His direction is not the direction that needs this country needs to go in. It's too long-winded. The power has gone to his mind. He's gone on GB News too many times", said Tommo of Bridge. Searchlight also reported that Tommo wanted Bridge to use part of Raise the Colours' proceeds from fundraising to pay him a salary and that Bridge refused. Recordings of voice notes leaked in May 2026 show that Tommo and Bridge traded violent threats against one another in the context of the split. In an online rant, Tommo told Bridge: "Do I need to stab you in the eye?" Raise the Colours subsequently renamed its planned activities in northern France "Operation Stop the Boats", while Tommo continued to use the "Operation Overlord" name.

On 23 January 2026, the prefects of Nord and Pas-de-Calais announced they had issued an interdepartmental order prohibiting self-proclaimed members of groups including Raise the Colours and others involved in anti-migrant vigilantism from being present and gathering in the districts of Dunkirk, Calais, Boulogne-sur-Mer, Montreuil-sur-Mer and Lille that weekend, timed to coincide with actions announced by Tommo .

After his split from Raise the Colours, Tommo went on to form a group called Patriot Platform, which claims to have been behind an anti-immigration protest that involved several hundred black-clad and masked men blocking roads in Dover on 5 September 2026 and a separate incident the following night, when members of the group blocked roads in Portsmouth to try to stop newly arrived migrants being taken to a processing centre.

== Trips to Afghanistan and Somalia ==
In March 2026, Ryan Bridge travelled to Afghanistan, stating that he "need[ed] to go and have a look at why… people leave their own country to come into our country". He filmed himself describing law and order in Afghanistan under the Taliban as "second to none" and "perfect". According to the Birmingham Mail, Bridge has "repeated his view that the only Afghanis fleeing the country are 'the shit of this country and the deserters...Yes, you're in serious trouble if you break the law [in Afghanistan]... but people who leave [...] want to come to the UK for financial benefit and because they are wrong uns". Journalist Jane Haynes has written that in making such statements, Bridge has showed "his ignorance of what Taliban rule means for women, girls and anyone else who fails to conform to their narrow worldview".

In October 2026, the Raise the Colours X account stated that Bridge had been detained in Mogadishu, Somalia and placed under house arrest there. According to Searchlight, Bridge "is being held in a more or less deserted UN compound", while "The circumstances of his detention remain unclear, as does the reason for his visit to Mogadishu". Raise the Colours' claims about Bridge being placed under house arrest have not been confirmed by the Somali authorities or independently verified. Kaab TV reported that Bridge "was reportedly detained for several hours by Somali authorities after allegedly filming restricted locations inside the Halane compound in Mogadishu without permission" and that the British Embassy had contacted the Somali government to discuss the situation. Back in the UK for a court hearing relating to Birmingham City Council's application for an injunction against Raise the Colours on 2 November, Bridge told Jane Haynes of the Birmingham Mail that he had visited Somalia as an "investigative journalist" and that footage he had posted online showed that it was a "safe country" to which migrants could be returned. Asked about the Somali Civil War and human rights abuses in the country, he said "Don't believe everything you read".

== Parades, protests and marches ==
=== Shirley St George's Day parade ===
In April 2026, it was reported that Raise the Colours were to be involved in an annual St George's parade taking place in Shirley, West Midlands on 26 April. A coalition of faith groups and anti-racist organisations wrote an open letter to the organisers, urging them to cut ties with the group, calling it a "far-right, anti-migrant" organisation and citing the police investigation into Ryan Bridge's actions in Oxfordshire. The groups writing the letter stated "To be clear, we have no objection to any event that celebrates community in a way that is open, inclusive, and respectful of all who call this country home. But Raise the Colours have made it very clear on numerous occasions that they have no interest in promoting unity, inclusivity or respect."

=== Henry Nowak protest ===
Current and former members of Raise the Colours were present at the violent protest that took place in Southampton on 3 June 2026, following the murder of Henry Nowak. A video taken from the crowd was posted to the group's social media, "showing protesters throwing a bin towards police outside the family home of Henry Nowak's murderer". An Institute for Strategic Dialogue analyst stated that this involvement reflected a "graduation" in the activity of groups such as Raise the Colours, which had "intensified over the past year". "Their involvement at Southampton reflects how Henry Nowak's murder has become yet another focal point, like the Southport stabbing, to prove purity within the movement and to take part in direct physical action", reported the analyst.

=== Brighton march ===
Ryan Bridge was announced as a speaker at an anti-immigration march in Brighton organised by the group South East Patriots, taking place on 13 June 2026. Other advertised speakers included UKIP leader Nick Tenconi. Around 300 people are estimated to have attended the protest, with around 4,000 people attending a counter-protest organised by Carnival Against Fascism, at which DJ Fatboy Slim performed. Eight people were arrested on the day, including Ryan Bridge, who was arrested on suspicion of common assault and bailed until 14 July. In late July, he was charged with common assault. Bridge appeared in court in Brighton on 5 October, when the charge against him was changed to assault by beating. He pleaded not guilty and a trial date was set for 15 March 2027.

=== Shrewsbury protest ===
On 22 August 2026, Raise the Colours took part in a protest organised by local flag-raising group Raise The Flags Shrewsbury Plus in The Quarry in Shrewsbury town centre. According to Searchlight, Britain First leader Paul Golding was due to address the protestors, but announced the evening before that he was ill, leaving Ryan Bridge as the main speaker. The Shrewsbury Star reported that there were around 100 present at the flags protest and that they were "vastly outnumbered" by a Stand Up To Racism counter-protest, which consisted of around 250 people.

== Statements from religious figures ==
The group have sought to "[position] their activities as the actions of English Christians protecting the Christian faith", with Danny Tommo stating at the beginning of one video "Christianity is at the forefront of everything we do". Members of the group have "share[d] images featuring Christian symbols of the cross and crucifix as well as pictures suggesting they are religious soldiers". The Bishop of Southwark, Christopher Chessun, and the Bishop of Kirkstall, Arun Arora, issued statements in December 2025 criticising Raise the Colours. Arora said: "Christ's call to love your neighbour is a hallmark and authenticator for all of those who would seek to follow his teachings or act in His name. It is a non-negotiable teaching which is glaringly absent in the actions of these men". Chessun stated that "Any co-opting or corrupting of the Christian faith to exclude others is unacceptable, and I am gravely concerned about the use of Christian symbols and rhetoric to apparently justify racism, violence and anti-migrant behaviours".

In February 2026, seven Church of England bishops, including Arora, the Bishop of Leicester Martyn Snow and the Bishop of Birmingham Michael Volland, issued a statement calling for the England flag to be a "symbol of unity" and criticising those "seeking to sow division and misunderstanding" by using it a symbol of anti-migrant sentiment.

== Relationship with the media ==
Ryan Bridge and Elliott Stanley have been interviewed several times on GB News. Early in Raise the Colours' flag-raising campaign in 2025, a journalist from the Birmingham Dispatch challenged Bridge's claim that his trial in Spain had already happened. Bridge reportedly grew frustrated, saying "well, that's nothing to do with what y–you either want to talk about flags or that, I mean this is mental. So you're obviously from left-wing, and you're trying to make something that's not…", before trailing off.

After Bridge and other Raise the Colours members had walked to the summit of Yr Wyddfa (Snowdon) with union flags and had an argument with a group of medical students in October 2026, Bridge wrote an article for the Bromsgrove Standard under the heading "They call us far right. But on top of Snowdon, I saw the true heart of Britain." In the article, Bridge wrote that when he unfurled a flag on the summit, "the divisions we are constantly told define our country simply fade away". Private Eye subsequently noted that "Bridge's piece played down a confrontation he had with a group of junior doctors at the summit after he had chosen to shout 'stop the boats'". The author biography accompanying the piece described Bridge as someone who "lives in the Bromsgrove area and writes about patriotism, national identity and his experiences travelling across the country", but Private Eye noted that it failed to mention that he was recently charged with 14 alleged offences, including racially aggravated harassment. After the article's publication, the newspaper's editor posted a comment beneath it, stating that the decision to publish it was "taken by the publisher and not the editor" and that any complaints should be sent to the publisher. Private Eye noted that the co-owner of the newspaper is Claire Bullivant, who set up the Great British PAC. Bullivant stated that publishing Bridge's article was not a sign of personal support for him or of bias, and "she berated local councillors who suggested otherwise".

The Birmingham Mail's politics and people editor, Jane Haynes, interviewed Bridge by telephone an hour after the announcement of the granting of an interim injunction against him and other flaggers in November 2026. Haynes wrotes that she realised quickly that Bridge had the call on speakerphone "livestreaming our conversation to his followers - a ploy he has used before without first seeking consent despite it contravening communications laws". According to Haynes, Bridge had done the same on a previous occasion, when he showed him phone screen to the camera, revealing her phone number to his followers. She reports receiving multiple "silent calls" in the following week, "along with unpleasant online messages, which may or may not have been connected".
