= Stephen A. Miles =

Businessperson (born 1967)

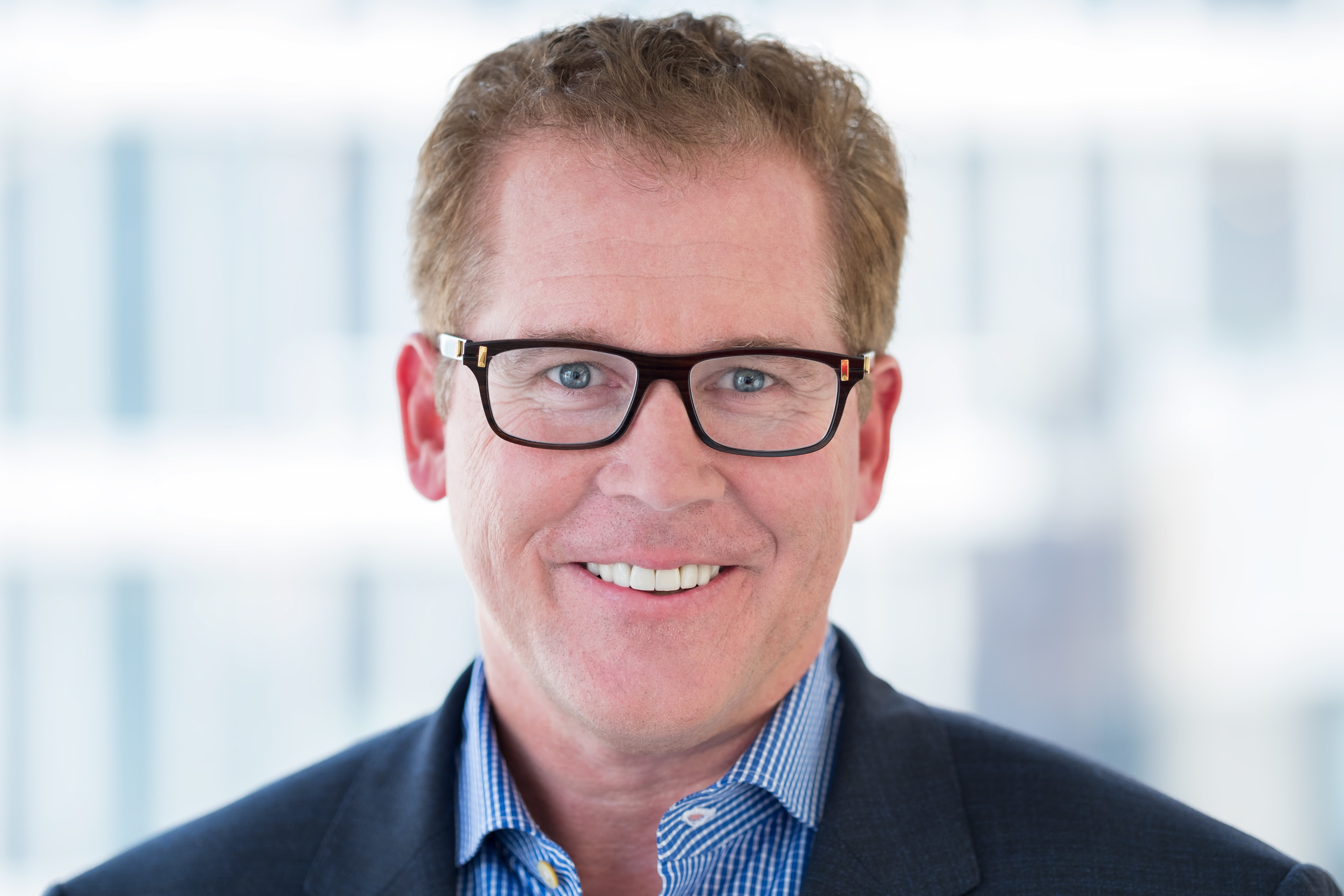
- Miles in 2021
- Born: November 28, 1967 (age 58); Nairobi, Kenya
- Education: Queen's University (B.A., MBA); University of Victoria (M.A. Psychology)
- Occupations: Author; CEO Coach; Consultant; Specialist on succession planning, Board Effectiveness and Role of COO

Stephen A. Miles is an author and executive consultant, and founder and chief executive officer of The Miles Group, as well as a director at CDK Global (NASDAQ: CDK; formerly ADP Dealer Services), where he serves as a member of the Compensation and Nominating & Governance Committees. Previously, he was a vice chairman at Heidrick & Struggles, where he ran Leadership Advisory Services and was a member of both the Global CEO and Board Practice, and the firm's management committee.

== Background ==
Miles was born in Nairobi, and spent his childhood in South Africa, Iraq, Argentina and Canada. In 1991, Miles received his Bachelor of Arts in Psychology from Queen's University in Kingston, Ontario and a Masters in Psychology from the University of Victoria in 1994.

After working as a social worker counseling maximum-security inmates at the Kingston Penitentiary in Ontario, Miles turned his focus to management and leadership, receiving his master's degree in Business Administration from Queen's University in 1999.

After graduating, Miles worked for a year as a consultant, before arriving at Heidrick & Struggles in 1999. After arriving at Heidrick & Struggles as a research analyst, Miles moved on to become a vice chairman and run Leadership Advisory Services within the Leadership Consulting Practice, overseeing the firm's worldwide executive assessment/succession planning activities.

== Career ==
Miles' research centers on CEO succession and leadership, using the 360 degree evaluation process. In 2010, Bloomberg Businessweek profiled Miles as a "rising star of CEO consulting" and CEO whisperer, highlighting his work in the area of CEO and executive coaching. Miles was mentioned in a 2018 Bloomberg Businessweek article as the executive coach of Snap, Inc. CEO Evan Spiegel, and is credited with helping Snap move from a "hub-and spoke" to a "distributed" model of leadership. Miles was featured in Fast Company's 2020 article on the Most Innovative Company of the year, Snap, Inc., in which he recounts his work with CEO Evan Spiegel.

His 2006 book, Riding Shotgun: The Role of the Chief Operating Officer, was featured in the Harvard Business Review as an in-depth study of the COO's role within a corporation and how the role can successfully intersect with that of the CEO.

In 2010, Miles and Stanford University Graduate School of Business Professor David F. Larcker collaborated on a Stanford Graduate School of Business case study on CEO succession planning, entitled "Multimillionaire Matchmaker." In the study, they found that 51% of companies could not name a CEO successor today, if needed. Miles and Larcker continued this thread of research in 2011 to examine whether active CEOs make the best board members, finding evidence to suggest that while active CEOs bring prestige to a board, they are often not the best choice because they are commonly too busy with their own businesses to be a fully effective director.

He is a regular contributor to Forbes and the Management Blog at Bloomberg Businessweek, and in 2019, Stephen launched the "C-Suite Intelligence" podcast.

== Bibliography ==
- Miles, Stephen A.; Larcker, David; & Tayan, Brian. (2021). "Protests from Within: Engaging with Employee Activists". Stanford Closer Look Series.
- Miles, Stephen A.; Larcker, David; Tayan, Brian; & Wright-Violichm Kim. (2018). "The Double-Edged Sword of CEO Activism". Stanford Closer Look Series.
- Bennett, Nathan; & Miles, Stephen A. (2017). "Re-invent Yourself as COO". European Business Review.
- Griffin, Taylor; Larcker, David; Miles, Stephen A.; & Tayan, Brian. (2017). "Board Evaluations and Boardroom Dynamics". Stanford Corporate Governance Research Initiative.
- Miles, Stephen A.; Larcker, David; Griffin, Taylor; & Tayan, Brian. (2017). "How Boards Should Evaluate Their Own Performance". Harvard Business Review.
- Miles, Stephen A.; Larcker, David; Griffin, Taylor; & Tayan, Brian. (2016). "2016 | Board Directors Evaluation and Effectiveness". Stanford Corporate Governance Research Initiative.
- Miles, Stephen A.; Larcker, David; & Tayan, Brian. (2016). "Succession "losers": What happens to executives passed over for the CEO job?". Stanford Closer Look Series.
- Miles, Stephen A.; Larcker, David; & Tayan, Brian. (2014). "The Handpicked CEO Successor". Stanford Closer Look Series.
- Miles, Stephen A.; & Sager Ira (2013). "Top Athletes Use Coaches. Why Don't CEOs?". Bloomberg Businessweek.
- Miles, Stephen A. (2013). "Why Are Boards Coming Up Short In Performance?". Corporate Board Member.
- Bennett, Nathan; & Miles, Stephen A. (2012). "Is Your Board About to Pick the Wrong CEO?". Corporate Board Member.
- Miles, Stephen A.; & Larcker, David (2011). "Do Active CEOs Make the Best Board Members?". Stanford Graduate School of Business.
- Miles, Stephen A.; & Bennett, Nathan (July 10, 2011). "Are You Ready to Replace Your CEO?". Bank Director.
- Bennett, Nathan; & Miles, Stephen A. (2010). Your Career Game: How Game Theory Can Help You Achieve Your Professional Goals. Palo Alto: Stanford Business Books. ISBN 0-8047-5628-7.
- Bennett, Nathan; & Miles, Stephen A. (March 24, 2010). "Business Decisions Are Like Golf Decisions". Forbes.
- Miles, Stephen A.; & Bennett, Nathan (November 18, 2010). "How The SEC Just Changed Succession Planning: Part II". Forbes.
- Miles, Stephen A.; & Bennett, Nathan (November 17, 2010). "How The SEC Just Changed Succession Planning: Part I". Forbes.
- Miles, Stephen A. (July 31, 2009). "Succession Planning: How To Do It Right". Forbes
- Miles, Stephen A. (July 30, 2009). "Succession Planning: How Everyone Does It Wrong". Forbes.
- Miles, Stephen A.; & Bennett, Nathan (March 31, 2009). "The Changing Employer-Employee Relationship". Businessweek.
- Bennett, Nathan; & Miles, Stephen A. (January 29, 2008). "The Right War To Fight?". Forbes.
- Miles, Stephen A. & Watkins, M.D. (2007). "The Leadership Team: Complementary Strengths or Conflicting Agendas?". Harvard Business Review. 85 (4): 90–98. PMID 17432156.
- Bennett, Nathan; & Miles, Stephen A. (2006). Riding Shotgun: The Role of the COO. Palo Alto: Stanford Business Books. ISBN 0-8047-5166-8.
- Bennett, Nathan & Miles, Stephen A. (2006). "Second in Command: The Misunderstood Role of the Chief Operating Officer". Harvard Business Review. 84 (5): 20–78.
