= Danny Tommo =

British far-right activist

- Tommo in 2025
- Born: Daniel Thomas; 25 December 1988 (age 37)
- Occupation: Roofer
- Known for: Patriot Platform; Far-right activism
- Children: 4

Daniel Thomas (born 25 December 1988), known publicly as Danny Tommo, is a British far-right activist who founded the anti-immigration group Patriot Platform. By posting footage from anti-migrant protests he has cultivated a following on social media.

In 2016, he was convicted of attempted kidnapping and sentenced to two years in prison. After his release, he became a bodyguard for Tommy Robinson followed by involvement with UKIP. Tommo later became a member of Raise the Colours, but left after falling out with the co-founder. His anti-migrant vigilantism with the group resulted in a ban on entering France.

In August 2026, he pleaded guilty to one charge relating to attempts to film asylum seekers who had been rescued from small boats in the English Channel. In November 2026 he was convicted of criminal damage to a dinghy, also in the English Channel, and sentenced to 15 months' imprisonment.

== Background ==
Tommo grew up on Hayling Island near Portsmouth. According to Hope Not Hate, he attended a fee-paying private school in Hampshire.

=== Early career ===
Tommo served in the British Army as a tank driver with the King’s Royal Hussars. However, his military career ended before he saw active service when he was medically discharged after dislocating his kneecap during bayonet training.

Before his political activism Tommo worked as bricklayer, a sales and marketing manager, and ran a web design firm. During a September 2026 court appearance, his barrister said that he was a "professional roofer by trade".

== Political activism ==
Following his release from prison after a conviction for attempted kidnap in 2016, Tommo became a close associate and bodyguard for English Defence League founder Tommy Robinson. In 2018, Tommo was photographed with Robinson at a planning event for a UKIP “Brexit Betrayal” rally, which was held the following year.

Tommo cultivated a following on social media platforms such as X and YouTube by regularly posting footage from anti-migrant protests, as well as interviews and viewpoints on Robinson, and supporting him during court cases.

In December 2019, Tommo was arrested while taking part in a counter-rally to an anti-Trump protest outside Buckingham Palace.

During the riots that followed the 2024 Southport stabbings, Tommo told his social media followers "Every city needs to go up".

In April 2026, Tommo promoted protests in Epsom after it had been alleged online that a woman had been gang-raped. Surrey Police later said they had "not found any evidence" of the offence as reported, but the investigation was ongoing. The police subsequently closed the case after it appeared the woman concerned made a "confused report" after sustaining "an accidental head injury" following a night out.

On 27 September, the Prime Minister, Andy Burnham, was asked by the BBC's Laura Kuenssberg whether he thought Tommo was a racist. Burnham responded that while he doesn't "just throw labels on people" and that he hadn't observed everything that he had said and done, "It's hard to conclude that he's anything other than someone who has racist views". He called his actions "the worst kind of hateful behaviour".

=== Raise the Colours ===
In January 2026, Tommo was one of 10 British nationals banned from entering France for engaging in anti-migrant vigilantism with the group Raise the Colours. According to Searchlight, in leaked voice recordings between Tommo and Raise the Colours co-founder Ryan Bridge, Tommo told Bridge that he felt it was time for him to "move away from Tommy [Robinson]" and that while he "loved him to bits", Robinson was no longer the right person for his ambitions. Searchlight states that Raise the Colours was the "vehicle Tommo initially saw as a route to a bigger role on the far right". He subsequently left the group after he fell out with Bridge.

=== Belfast riots ===
In June 2026, Tommo travelled to Belfast during the 2026 Northern Ireland riots. He was subsequently incorrectly identified in social media posts to be the victim of the stabbing attack that precipitated the riots. His photo appeared in posts purporting to identify the victim, who was in fact an Irish man named Stephen Ogilvie.

=== Patriot Platform ===
What I've witnessed in Belfast has given me the inspiration to realise that when everyone gets involved who's committed, a change can be made. [...] We are going to produce a patriotic army of thousands and thousands of English and British men that are done with protesting, done with walking down roads, and want to make a difference.

— Danny Tommo, June 2026

In June or July 2026, Tommo formed a group called Patriot Platform. In a video, he declared his intent to establish the group a day after the riots in Belfast. He then held recruitment rallies during summer 2026. He said that members of Patriot Platform are "encouraged to give their life to Jesus [and] to go to church".

The group, led by Tommo, was behind an anti-immigration protest in Dover on 5 September 2026 and the following night in Portsmouth to try to stop newly arrived migrants being taken to a processing centre. Tommo livestreamed the Portsmouth protest from the scene. On the livestream, he filmed himself and another, bare-chested man, running along a beach, shouting at emergency workers. According to The National, Tommo was subsequently "widely mocked for clambering into the sea in the apparent belief that police can't arrest people if they're swimming".

On 9 September 2026, a protest led by Tommo was held outside the London office of the Daily Mail demanding that the newspaper buy a new house for Tommo's mother, after he said that it had "doxxed" her by publishing the name of the town she lives in and the name of his roofing firm. Tommo later appealed for donations online to help his mother move house. During the protest he offered to pay supporters, in cash, for any work they had missed to attend.

Later in September 2026, after Tommo said that thousands of Patriot Platform members could travel to Piddington, Oxfordshire to prevent asylum seekers being moved to the site, should plans to use a former military site to house them go ahead, the Home Secretary, Shabana Mahmood, said that Tommo was "a far-right and outright racist" who would feel "the full force of the law" should Patriot Platform commit any crimes near sites including Piddington.

== Criminal charges ==
=== 2016 Conviction for attempted kidnapping ===
In July 2016, Tommo pleaded guilty to attempting to kidnap a man at knifepoint. Along with two others, he broke into the man's house armed with knives, shouting "You're coming with us". The group falsely alleged that the man had stolen £10,000 worth of drugs from them. The judge, who sentenced Tommo to two years in prison, called the incident "extraordinarily frightening" and said it was matched only by its "stupidity". The judge told Tommo and his accomplices "Go and serve your sentences, learn the lesson and for God's sake don't get involved in anything as stupid again".

=== 2026 Port of Dover charges ===
In August 2026, Tommo appeared at Margate Magistrates' Court on charges relating to small boats in the English Channel as they were landed at the Port of Dover. He pleaded guilty to entering a restricted harbour area and not guilty to charges including using threatening or abusive words or behaviour and using racially abusive words or behaviour. His trial date has been set for 1 to 3 June 2027.

=== 2026 Conviction for criminal damage to a dinghy ===
On 22 September 2026, Tommo recorded himself on a small boat on the English Channel, tracking two dinghies that were carrying asylum seekers. As the migrants were assisted off one of the dinghies, he approached it, shouting "Let's get rid of that boat". He then slashed the side of the dinghy with a knife while a French rescue worker was still on board. Police said that they were examining footage of him slashing the dinghy. Soon after, the RNLI facilitated the transfer of the asylum seekers to a Border Force vessel. On social media, Tommo called on his followers to travel to Gosport to conduct a protest where the Border Force were expected to land the asylum seekers.

The day after the slashing, Tommo was arrested on suspicion of criminal damage with intent to endanger life, as well as several offences under maritime law. He recorded his arrest, which was streamed on his YouTube channel. The next evening, police announced that Tommo had been charged with criminal damage and failing to disclose his phone PIN. That evening, around 200 supporters gathered outside a police investigation centre in Basingstoke, believing that he was inside.

On 25 September, Tommo entered a plea of not guilty to both charges via video link to Basingstoke Magistrates' Court and was remanded in custody. Tommy Robinson was in attendance. On 29 September, Tommo appeared at Portsmouth Crown Court via video link. He was refused bail and again remanded into custody. The date of trial was set for March 2027, but on 12 November he changed his plea on the criminal damage charge to guilty. He was sentenced to 15 months in jail on 20 November. The judge called Tommo a "publicity seeker" and said that the "offence amounted to a flagrant interference and a deliberate disruption of the legitimate activities of the border force, the coastguard and RNLI volunteers."

== Personal life ==
Tommo has four children. His partner is pregnant with their fifth child.

Declaration of Christian faith has become part of Tommo's public persona. He was photographed at St Lawrence Church, Morden in February and March 2026, and has said: "I have repented my sins and, under Jesus Christ, I am a new man". The BBC journalist Daniel Sandford described Tommo's public Christianity as potentially "a way of painting the UK as a Christian country, and Muslim immigrants as outsiders".
