= Chief operating officer =

Executive position

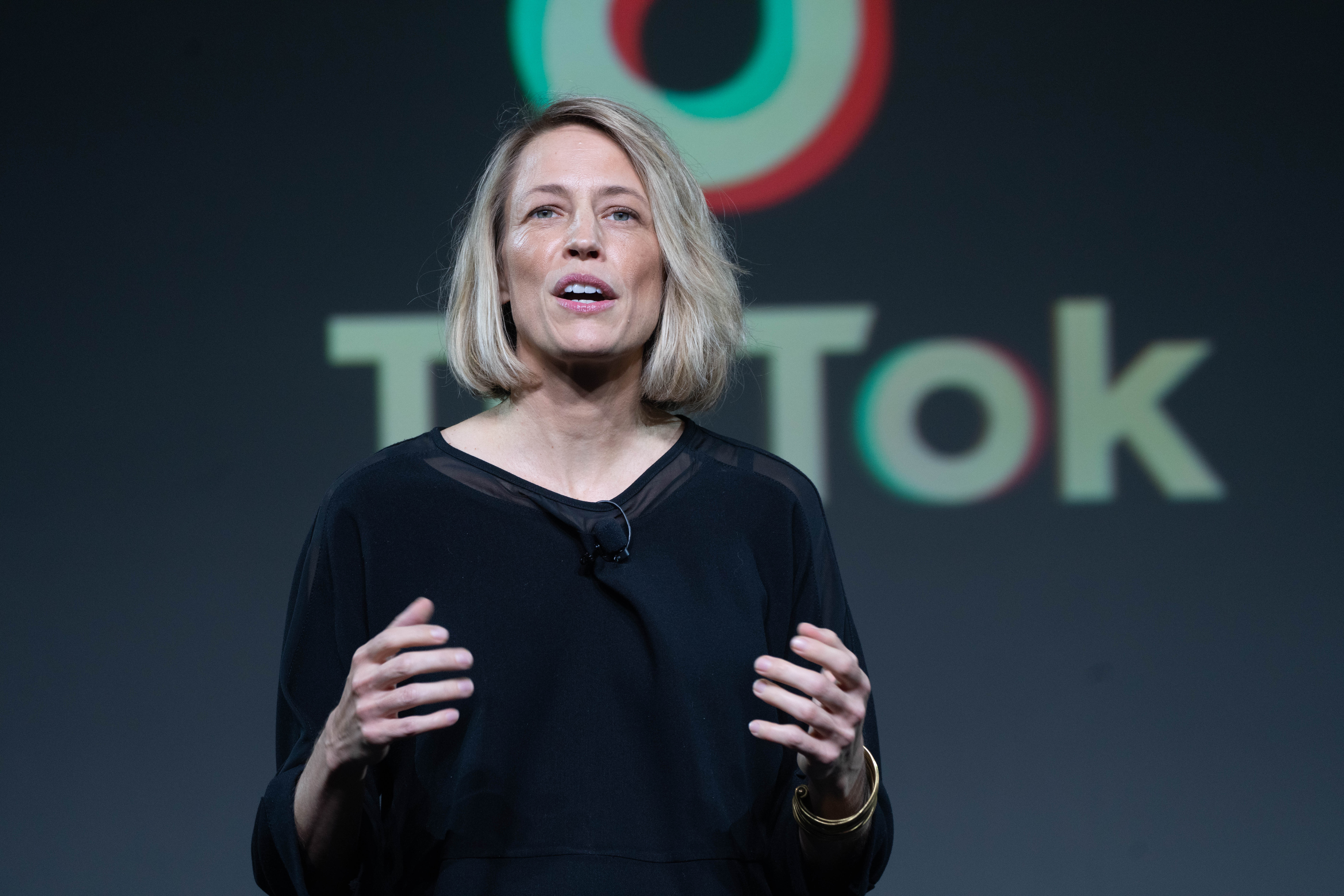
Vanessa Pappas, former COO of TikTok

A chief operating officer (COO), also called chief operations officer, is an executive in charge of the daily operations of an organization (i.e. personnel, resources, and logistics). COOs are usually second-in-command to the chief executive officer (CEO), and report directly to them, acting on their behalf in their absence.

In some situations the position may be appointed by the board of directors, for example where a COO is appointed as the CEO's successor.

== Responsibilities and relationships ==
=== Roles and functions ===
The role of the COO differs from industry to industry and from organization to organization. Some organizations function without a COO. Others may have two COOs, each assigned to oversee several business lines or divisions, such as Lehman Brothers from 2002 to 2004 when Bradley Jack and Joseph M. Gregory were the co-COOs. A COO could also be brought in from other organizations as a "fixer", such as Daniel J. O'Neill who in 1999 joined Molson in that capacity.

In the manufacturing sector, the primary role of the COO is routinely one of operations management, meaning that the COO is responsible for the development, design, operation, and improvement of the systems that create and deliver the firm's products. The COO is responsible for ensuring that business operations are efficient and effective and that the proper management of resources, distribution of goods and services to customers and analysis of queue systems is conducted.

Despite the functional diversity associated with the role of COO, there are some common functions the COOs usually perform:

- At the direction of the CEO and board of directors, marshalling limited resources to the most productive uses with the aim of creating maximum value for the company's stakeholders
- Developing and cascading the organization's strategy/mission statement to the lower-ranking staff, and implementing appropriate rewards/recognition and coaching or corrective practices to align personnel with company goals
- Planning by prioritizing customer, employee, and organizational requirements
- Maintaining and monitoring staffing, levels, knowledge-skills-attributes (KSA), expectations and motivation to fulfill organizational requirements
- Driving performance measures for the operation (including a consideration of efficiency versus effectiveness), often in the form of dashboards convenient for review of high-level key indicators

=== Relationship with CEO ===
Unlike other C-suite positions, which tend to be defined according to commonly designated responsibilities across most companies, a COO's job tends to be defined in relation to the specific CEO with whom they work, given the close working relationship of these two individuals.

The selection of a COO is similar in many ways to the selection of a vice president or chief of staff of the United States: power and responsibility structures vary in government and private regimes depending on the style and needs of the president or CEO. Thus, the COO role meets individual expectations and changes as leadership teams adjust.

The COO position is common in firms that are operationally intensive, such as airline and automotive industries.

Because the COO is often responsible for serving as an information conduit to the CEO, it is essential that the relationship between COO and CEO be a positive one. Trust is the most important ingredient necessary for a CEO-COO relationship to thrive. The CEO must have full confidence that the COO is not making direct passes for their job, can get the work done, and shares their vision (rather than using their trusted spot and access to information to undermine the CEO's strategy or implement his/her own vision). When a relationship built upon trust is created between the CEO and COO, firm performance is improved and shareholder results are strengthened. Some strategies that are key to building trust in the CEO-COO relationship include:

- Communication—The CEO has to be comfortable sharing information with the COO and regularly communicating the strategy and any changes to it. Similarly, the COO has to be comfortable regularly providing status updates to the CEO. When communication breaks down, mistrust or misunderstanding is likely to mess things up.
- Clear decision rights—The COO role appears to work the best when the roles and responsibilities of the COO have been clearly delineated ahead of time and the COO is allowed to make the final decision within a pre-agreed-upon scope.
- Lock on the backdoor—The CEO must not undermine the COO's credibility by continually reversing decisions. When employees learn that they can get a different answer by going directly to the CEO as opposed to the COO, the COO role quickly becomes impotent.
- Sharing the spotlight—In effective CEO-COO relationships, both parties are comfortable with how much "credit" they receive for their work internally, externally, from the board of directors, and from each other.
- Fit between CEO and COO—The two individuals must respect each other and effectively partner together. This is not a partnership that can be forced.
- Fit Between the COO and the position—The selected COO must have the right credentials to carry out the purpose for which the COO role was created (which can include everything from operations expertise to change expertise to having a complementary skill set to the CEO).
- Transparency of succession expectations and timeline—Both parties must understand whether the COO desires the CEO job, whether the COO is in consideration for the top job, and what the timing might be for such a transition.

=== Successor to CEO ===
Routinely in large organizations the COO will be the heir apparent to the CEO. Individuals may have worked their way (internally) up the company ladder before being named COO, or may have been recruited from an outside company. Either way, the position is used as a training and testing ground for the next CEO.

A 2003 Crist Associates study revealed that only 17% of companies that promote a COO to a CEO replace the COO within the next year.

An Accenture study found that approximately one in nine COOs moved into the CEO's shoes within a year of their departure and that half of COOs see themselves as the "heir apparent." COOs transitioning into the CEO role often face similar challenges including:

- Not being automatically granted the luxury of a diagnostic period. Given that they know the company, COOs turned CEOs are often expected to hit the ground running when in actuality they too need to enter diagnostic mode to fully understand their new role and to see the company from a new perspective.
- Finding time to manage a new key stakeholder: The board. Many COOs turned CEOs are often surprised how time-intensive managing the board of directors can be and must learn to incorporate this important responsibility into an already packed schedule.
- Being in the spotlight. COOs are used to having the luxury of working "behind the scenes." As CEO, many are surprised to find they have become a "public" figure both inside and outside the organization and must learn how to manage this additional obligation.
- Recalibrating their image. Often COOs struggle not with the strategy portion of the job itself, but overcoming the perception of other stakeholders that they are an "execution" executive versus a "strategy" executive. As a result, nearly 50% of the S&P 500 companies have opted to appoint a Chief Strategy Officer (CSO) to be a "mini CEO" and as peer to the COO.

According to researchers Miles and Bennett, just knowing these common pitfalls can help a COO "heir" better prepare for the transition, thereby avoiding them in totality or ensuring that at least they do not evolve into full derailers once they are in the CEO seat.

=== Relationship with board of directors ===
In addition to having a strong and trusting relationship with the CEO, the COO should also have an effective relationship with the board. A good relationship between COO and the board allows the board to better understand and independently judge a potential successor. A strong relationship between the board and the COO also offers the board an additional expert opinion on the health of the company, and status of key initiatives. It benefits the CEO to allow such a relationship to form because it reflects confidence and fosters transparency. It also reinforces that the CEO is capable of developing talent, and helps the CEO to retain the COO by further empowering the individual. A strong relationship benefits the COOs in that they are able to expand their experience as well as their professional network. Additionally, if they are looking to be the next CEO, it allows them to develop credibility with the board. Researchers advise the COO to go beyond simply presenting at board meetings, to ensure they are developing strong one-on-one relationships with each board director. Researchers also urge the COO to develop their own voice, independent of the CEO.

=== Relationship with president ===
In a similar vein to the COO, the title of corporate president as a separate position (as opposed to being combined with a "C-suite" designation, such as "president and CEO" or "president and COO") is also loosely defined. The president is usually the legally recognized highest rank of corporate officer, ranking above the various vice presidents (including senior vice president and executive vice president), but on its own generally considered subordinate, in practice, to the CEO.

Lloyd E. Reuss was president of General Motors from 1990 to 1992, as the right-hand man of chairman and CEO Robert C. Stempel. Stempel insisted on naming Reuss as company president in charge of North American operations, the board reluctantly agreed but showed their displeasure by not giving Reuss the title of COO.

Richard D. Parsons was number two in the company hierarchy during his tenure as president of Time Warner from 1995 to 2001, but he had no authority over the operating divisions, and instead took on assignments at the behest of chairman and CEO Gerald Levin.

Michael Capellas was appointed president of Hewlett-Packard in order to ease its acquisition and integration of Compaq, where Capellas was previously chairman and CEO. Capellas ended up serving just six months as HP president before departing. His former role of president was not filled as the executives who reported to him then reported directly to the CEO.

In 2007, the investment banking firms of Bear Stearns and Morgan Stanley each had two presidents (Warren Spector and Alan Schwartz at Bear, Robert Scully and Zoe Cruz at Morgan) reporting to one CEO (who was also chairman of the board); each president was essentially a co-COO (despite the lack of title) overseeing half of the firm's business divisions. Schwartz became sole president of Bear after Spector was ousted, and several months later assumed the position of CEO as well when James Cayne was forced to resign (Cayne remained chairman).

Tom Anselmi of Maple Leaf Sports & Entertainment was chief operating officer from 2004 until September 6, 2013. Between the departure of Richard Peddie and the hiring of Tim Leiweke for the posts of president and CEO, Anselmi added the title of president from September 4, 2012, to June 30, 2013, however he remained COO and did not receive the title of CEO.

Richard Fuld, the chairman and CEO of Lehman Brothers, had a succession of "number twos" under him, usually titled as president and chief operating officer. Chris Pettit was Fuld's second-in-command for two decades until November 26, 1996, when he resigned as president and board member. Pettit lost a power struggle with his deputies (Steve Lessing, Tom Tucker, and Joseph M. Gregory) on March 15 that year that caused him to relinquish its COO title, likely brought about after the three men found about Pettit's extramarital affairs, which violated Fuld's unwritten rules on marriage and social etiquette. Bradley Jack and Joseph M. Gregory were appointed co-COOs in 2002, but Jack was demoted to the office of the chairman in May 2004 and departed in June 2005 with a severance package of $80 million, making Gregory the sole COO. While Fuld was considered the "face" of Lehman brothers, Gregory was in charge of day-to-day operations and he influenced culture to drive the bottom line. Gregory was demoted on June 12, 2008, and replaced as president and COO by Bart McDade, who had been serving as head of Equities, and McDade would see Lehman through bankruptcy.

Thomas W. LaSorda served as president and CEO of Chrysler from January 1, 2006, to August 5, 2007, while Chrysler was owned by Daimler-Benz. When Cerberus Capital bought majority control of Chrysler, Bob Nardelli was appointed chairman and CEO of Chrysler, while LaSorda became vice chairman and president. Despite the appointment of a second vice chairman and president, Jim Press, LaSorda stayed on. LaSorda's titles as vice chairman and president officially stated that he was in charge of manufacturing, procurement and supply, employee relations, global business development and alliances. However, LaSorda's actual role was to find a new partner or buyer for Chrysler, leading to speculation that Cerberus Capital was less interested in rebuilding the auto manufacturer than it was to turning profit though a leveraged buyout.

Research in Motion's corporate structure had more than one COO, including Jim Rowan as chief operating officer for global operations, and Thorsten Heins as COO of products and sales.

The Walt Disney Company has used the president and COO titles in varied ways for their number two executive. Ron W. Miller was president from 1978 to 1984, while serving additionally as CEO for 18 months from 1983 to 1984. Frank Wells was president from 1984 to 1994, where he reported to the board of directors and not chairman and CEO Michael Eisner. When Wells died in a helicopter crash, no replacement president was named as his duties were resumed by Eisner. Michael Ovitz was president from 1995 to 1997, being hired by Eisner and then dismissed not long afterwards. Bob Iger was president and COO from 2000 to 2005, when he succeeded Eisner as CEO. Thomas O. Staggs was COO from 2015 to 2016, during that time the senior executive team had a dual reporting structure to both Staggs and Iger; Staggs resigned after the board did not give him assurances that he would succeed as CEO.

Manulife has used the president and COO titles for separate roles. From June 5 until September 30, 2017, Rocco "Roy" Gori served as president where he oversaw Manulife's global operating businesses, with his subordinates being the general managers of the Canadian, U.S., and Asia Divisions, and the chief investment officer. Gori reported to chief executive officer Donald Guloien before additionally assuming the title of CEO on October 1, 2017, upon Guloien's retirement. Linda Mantia, the chief operating officer, reported to the president on corporate strategy while continuing to report to the CEO on all other matters including corporate development, Analytics, Technology, Marketing, Innovation, human resources, regulatory and public affairs, global resourcing and procurement, and the global program office.

Advance UK, a far-right political party in the United Kingdom, appointed Tim Power as its COO instead of having a deputy leader. In June 2026, the party was merged into the Great British PAC (a campaign group), which led to conflict between party leader Ben Habib (along with Claire Bullivant), and Power.

At the World Bank, the president outranks the other executives including the CEO and chief economist.

== Failure in the COO role ==
Any breakdown in trust between the CEO and COO can lead to failure. Additionally, the COO typically has to be a high-level leader who is comfortable being fully in charge. Many executives with the leadership skills necessary to be a top-level COO would prefer to be running their own organization as opposed to taking orders from a CEO. For COOs who are expecting to serve their time and be promoted to the top spot, their timelines for such a move can often be out of sync with the CEO's, causing a breakdown in the relationship. COOs can also find themselves trapped into being labeled an "operations" person or a "number two" as opposed to being seen as a strategic and top-level leader by the board of directors, which causes some executives to steer clear of the position. Harry Levinson effectively summarized the challenges of the COO position: "The relationship between the chief executive officer and the chief operating officer in any organization is fraught with many psychological complexities. Perhaps it is the most difficult of all organizational working relationships because more than others, it is a balancing act on the threshold of power.".

== Experts and research ==
Nathan Bennett and Stephen A. Miles have researched the role of COOs. Their published works analyse the role and its effectiveness, classify the different types of COOs, and examine relationships between CEOs and COOs.

Most modern companies operate without a COO. For example, in 2007 almost 58% of Fortune 500 companies did not have a COO. In these instances the CEO either takes on more roles and responsibilities, or the roles traditionally assigned to the COO are carried out by sub C-suite executives. Although the number of COOs has been in decline for the past 10 years, there are reasons to anticipate an increased utilization of the position in the future, including:

- Companies are becoming larger and more complex, making it more difficult for one person alone to have total oversight over the whole organization.
- Companies are finding a strong relationship between firm performance and the presence of a COO.
- Companies are becoming more deliberate about CEO succession planning and will use the role to on-board and train successors.
- The increase in talent mobility means that the role will likely be used more often as a retention mechanism for key executives who are at risk of moving to a competitor.
