= Patriot Platform =

British far-right group

- Founded: June 2026
- Founder: Danny Tommo
- Type: Far-right activist group
- Location: United Kingdom
- Fields: Anti-immigration
- Website: patriotplatform.co.uk

Patriot Platform is a far-right anti-immigration activist group in the United Kingdom, established in summer 2026 by Daniel Thomas, known as Danny Tommo. He founded the group after he split from Raise the Colours, having fallen out with one of its co-founders. The group has brought together a number of existing, local far-right groups under Tommo as a single leader. It came to public prominence due to its organisation of anti-immigration protests in Dover, Portsmouth and Gosport in September 2026, at which its members wore all black clothing and balaclavas. Police have made a number of arrests in relation to the protests.

== Formation and leadership ==
Tommo founded the far-right (Note: Multiple sources describe the group as far-right) group Patriot Platform after his involvement with the Raise the Colours group ended when he fell out with its co-founder, Ryan Bridge. The group was launched in June or July 2026. Its website was registered in May and Tommo first posted about the group on YouTube on 8 June.

What I’ve witnessed in Belfast has given me the inspiration to realise that when everyone gets involved who’s committed, a change can be made. [...] We are going to produce a patriotic army of thousands and thousands of English and British men that are done with protesting, done with walking down roads, and want to make a difference.

— Danny Tommo, June 2026

After visiting Belfast during the 2026 Northern Ireland riots, Tommo declared his intent to establish the group via video. According to Searchlight, he held a number of recruitment rallies for Patriot Platform during summer 2026. These included one at Burton Dassett Hills, at which Searchlight reported Tommo had said to attendees: "The threat of a violent act is more powerful than the violent act itself".

According to the Daily Telegraph, Tommo set up the group to "reclaim our borders, restore order and send a clear message: Britain belongs to the British". He has stated that he wants "discipline" from group members rather than "drinkers" or "violence", but an investigation by Hope Not Hate found that his hand-picked supporters included men with histories of criminality, including convictions for violence against women. Kevin Rawlinson of The Guardian reported that "Patriot Platform is actually the moulding together of a series of local far-right groups under a single leader". In The Conversation, academic William Allchorn described what appeared to be "an evolution in British far-right activism: away from conventional demonstrations and towards something more mobile, networked and potentially vigilante in nature."

Tommo has raised money for Patriot Platform via an American Christian crowdfunding platform. The group sought to raise £5,000 a month to pay for transport, boats and a studio. In September 2026 alone the group raised around £9,000.

Tommo has said that every member of Patriot Platform "is encouraged to give their life to Jesus [and] to go to church". Conversely, Arun Arora, the Bishop of Kirkstall, views the use of the cross on protest marches as "a fashion accessory utilised by opportunists".

In June 2026, a boat purchased by Tommo using donations from supporters sunk in Littlehampton Harbour after developing mechanical issues. In September, it was reported that he was crowdfunding to buy a replacement boat for use by Patriot Platform.

Searchlight reports that, following Tommo's arrest in connection with the Gosport protest, Billy Cooper appears to have assumed the leadership, noting that he was in charge of a gathering of the group at Bolton Arch near Basingstoke on 29 September 2026. Searchlight further asserts, as reported in the Insurance Times, that in 2018 Cooper was found to be "fundamentally dishonest" by a court in Brighton after making a fraudulent injury claim for £98,000 following a car accident. Cooper has previously been reported as involved in the raising of Union Jacks and St George's flags similar to the activities of Raise the Colours.

Each week churches across our diocese welcome through their doors people of all ethnicities, backgrounds, political and ideological perspectives. We believe that the gospel is for everyone – that we all need God and that those who seek him in faith will find him. [...] Nevertheless, we – alongside the leadership of the church in question – deplore any kind of violent or menacing behaviour, behaviour which is contrary to the law, or which denies the dignity and rights of others. We find in the Bible no grounds for the justification of Christian nationalism.

— Bishops of the Diocese of Southwark, September 2026

In September 2026 the Bishops of the Diocese of Southwark released a statement after concerns had been raised to them about members of Patriot Platform attending St Lawrence Church, Morden, which highlighted the group's "language and actions" and "anti-migrant rhetoric". The statement affirmed support for "all ethnicities, backgrounds, political and ideological perspectives" while condemning "violent or menacing behaviour".

== Dover and Portsmouth protests ==
Patriot Platform was behind an anti-immigration protest that involved several hundred men wearing black clothes and balaclavas, which were described by observers as "paramilitary gear", blocking roads in Dover on 5 September 2026. The group had reportedly "initially threatened to blockade Dover for three days". The group had reportedly "initially threatened to blockade Dover for three days". According to The i Paper, "Videos of the demonstration have drawn comparisons to the 'Blackshirts', the paramilitary wing of Benito Mussolini's National Fascist Party in Italy, as well as Oswald Mosely's British Union of Fascists in the 1930s".

The following night, members of the group blocked roads in Portsmouth to try to stop newly arrived migrants being taken to a processing centre. A boat carrying around 140 migrants had arrived, having left Baie de Seine in the morning. The French authorities stated that it was unusual for a boat carrying migrants to depart from as far from Calais as Baie de Seine. The number of boat crossings over summer 2026 had dropped to its lowest level since 2019, but in response to British and French government actions to prevent crossings, smuggling gangs are reported to have changed tactics, loading more people onto a smaller number of larger boats, which have been called "mega dinghies". Prior to 6 September, there had been a period of six days in which there were no boat arrivals.

You know who I am, my name is Danny Tommo, you saw what I did in Dover and if you don't stop right now I'm calling 1,000 men to come to this place.

— Danny Tommo, September 2026

Tommo livestreamed the Portsmouth protest from the scene, he filmed himself and another, bare-chested man, running along a beach, shouting at emergency workers. According to The National, he was subsequently "widely mocked for clambering into the sea in the apparent belief that police can't arrest people if they're swimming". Nick Lowles of Hope Note Hate said that the protests had attracted "some of the more aggressive and more violent of the far-right activists from around the country".

A number of police officers were injured during the Portsmouth protest. The chair of Hampshire Police Federation said that officers had been pushed off of police motorbikes and had stones and bricks thrown at them. One of the injured officers had only finished his training three days earlier. A group of protestors confronted a Royal National Lifeboat Institution (RNLI) crew, calling them "traitors". Two RNLI members were the subject of online doxing attempts. The RNLI lifeboat station in Portsmouth has been temporarily closed since 10 September as a result of abuse received since the protest.

=== Political reaction ===
The events in Dover with masked Patriot Platform members blocking roads were widely condemned by mainstream political parties. Jonathan Reynolds, the Secretary of State for Business, Innovation, Science and Trade, said of the Dover protest: "I condemn it. Peaceful protest is an essential part of British life but that's not dressing up in costumes like this and disrupting people's lives." After the Portsmouth protest, the government said that people had a right to protest peacefully but that it condemned "intimidating and thuggish behaviour". The Shadow Home Secretary Chris Philp said that the Portsmouth protest showed that people were "genuinely angry at the government's failure to stop the boats", but also that "nothing excuses either violent or disruptive protest".

Reform UK leader, Nigel Farage, called the fact that the Dover protestors were wearing balaclavas "disgusting" and called for the wearing of them in public spaces to be banned, but the party's chairman Lee Anderson, while condemning "attacks on our police", said: "If you're going to protest then be careful, do it the right way then you have my full support because the left are just looking for an excuse to label you all as far right thugs. You're not, you are decent patriotic Brits who've had enough." The Guardian wrote that "Reform is gripped with internal friction over the activists". Restore Britain leader Rupert Lowe said that his party "proudly stands with those peacefully protesting against illegal immigration in Dover". He called the group's use of face coverings "undesirable" but said that it was "perfectly fair for people living in this Orwellian age".

I just want to make that really clear, just so that we’re really clear about this, right? There is never any excuse for violence against police officers who are doing their job. They are taking orders, and that is what it is.

— Zia Yusuf, September 2026

The day after the Portsmouth protest, Tommo interrupted Reform UK home affairs spokesperson Zia Yusuf, who was giving an interview to media outlets in the city. Tommo told Yusuf that Nigel Farage needed to be "careful with his words", after he had referred to people participating in the Unite the Kingdom march earlier in the year "knuckle-draggers". Yusuf responded to Tommo and condemned police violence.

=== Criticism of police response ===
I will be looking urgently on Monday to ask questions around why we didn’t know about this, because we do tend to know when protests are coming to the area. In this instance it would appear that the police didn’t know about it and the resources were pretty thin on the ground.

— Mike Tapp, September 2026

The fact that the Dover protest appeared planned led to criticism of the police's lack of preparedness by Labour MP for Dover, Mike Tapp, due to perceived lack of resources and intelligence. Police initially called the protest "spontaneous". The BBC reports that the police "have admitted not knowing about the protest in advance, leading to accusations of a failure in intelligence-gathering".

On 10 September, the Home Secretary, Shabana Mahmood, announced that she expected police forces to make "full use" of powers allowing them to ban the use of face coverings at protests in future. The Hampshire and Isle of Wight Constabulary announced that it planned to use the powers in relation to a further protest planned for Portsmouth on 12 September and that anyone breaching the restriction could face arrest.

== Daily Mail protest ==
On 9 September 2026, members of Patriot Platform led by Tommo held a protest outside the London office of the Daily Mail. He demanded that the newspaper buy a new house for his mother, after he said that it had "doxxed” her by publishing the name of the town she lives in and the name of his roofing firm, which he had publicly registered to the address, saying that if this did not happen within 48 hours then he would return with a larger group of men. Tommo later appealed for donations online to help his mother move house.

== Proposed Piddington action ==
Tommo has said that thousands of Patriot Platform members could travel to Piddington, Oxfordshire, should plans to use a former military site to house asylum seekers go ahead, in order to attempt to prevent asylum seekers being moved on to the site. The Home Secretary, Shabana Mahmood, said that he was "a far-right and outright racist" who would feel "the full force of the law" should Patriot Platform commit any crimes near sites including Piddington.

== Gosport protest and arrests ==
On social media on 22 September 2026, Tommo called on his followers to travel to Gosport to conduct a protest when the Border Force were expected to land asylum seekers. He spent the afternoon on a boat in the English Channel, following two dinghies carrying migrants. Tommo recorded himself on a small boat on the English Channel, tracking two dinghies that were carrying asylum seekers. As the migrants were assisted off one of the dinghies, he approached it, shouting "Let's get rid of that boat". He then slashed the side of the dinghy with a knife while a French rescue worker was still on board.

Several hundred people turned up in Gosport, but the Border Force boat to which migrants had been transferred landed in Dover instead. According to The Times, at the protest, "Crowds of masked protesters confronted a line of police to chants of 'let them drown' sung by a child over a megaphone". The police made six arrests in relation to the Gosport protest, for suspected offences including assaulting an emergency worker, aggravated trespass, and careless driving.

The day after the incident, Tommo was arrested on suspicion of criminal damage with intent to endanger life, as well as several offences under maritime law. He was later charged with criminal damage and failing to disclose his phone PIN. That evening, around 200 supporters gathered outside a police investigation centre in Basingstoke, believing that he was inside.

On 25 September, Tommo entered a plea of not guilty to both charges via video link to Basingstoke Magistrates' Court and was remanded in custody. Tommy Robinson was in attendance. On 29 September, Tommo appeared at Portsmouth Crown Court via video link. He was refused bail and again remanded into custody. The date of trial was set for March 2027, but on 12 November he changed his plea on the criminal damage charge to guilty.

Tommo was sentenced to 15 months in jail on 20 November. The judge said that the "offence amounted to a flagrant interference and a deliberate disruption of the legitimate activities of the border force, the coastguard and RNLI volunteers", adding: "Those organisations perform essential roles in policing the maritime border. They do necessary, highly sensitive and very difficult jobs. Their work should not be interrupted by a publicity seeker slashing with a knife at a boat that they were trying to recover."

== Local groups and "Patriot Patrols" ==
According to advocacy group Hope Not Hate in November 2026, Patriot Platform consists of 29 affiliated local groups, many of which are organised under regional groups. There are also unofficial "patriot" groups, some of which "are almost entirely inactive, while others are effectively PP affiliates in all but name, attending meetings and events alongside formal chapters with little differentiation between them".

In late September 2026, a Facebook page with the name Blackpool Patriot Platform posted a video of the group "patrolling" a public park. In the video, several members of the group approach a young black man, with one telling him: "You can’t sit here where the women and children are, mate. Can you just go round there, please? There are women and children on the park. They don't feel safe at the minute, that's all. They don't feel safe with foreign men sitting staring at them unimpeded." The post accompanying the video told readers, "If you see any migrants hanging round your local areas please message the page and we will peacefully patrol these areas". Searchlight reports that members of Greater Manchester Patriots have also "patrolled" areas of Manchester, to "make sure our women are safe from migrants".

A group called the Chelmsley Wood Patriots, formed as a local branch of Patriot Platform, organised its first march in Chelmsley Wood in late September 2026. The march was attended by several Reform UK local councillors. In October, the group posted a recording of several of its members, dressed in black and wearing balaclavas, confronting, interrogating and checking the phones of a three male Indian university students in Meriden Park in Chelmsley Wood. In the footage, the Patriots group asked the men when they moved to England, and told them: "Do not come round here again. Do not be seen here again. This is your final warning. You will not get a warning again, stay away, stay away! Go back to your house yeah and stay away. Take yourself back to where you f****g live then yeah." The students told police that a larger group of people had then surrounded them and the Birmingham Dispatch reports that "In an attempt to quash the concerns of the group that they didn't mean harm, the students provided their address to members of the group — who followed them home". Their house was then attacked, though "It isn't clear whether any of the original group who went out on patrol were part of the attack". During the attack, a window was broken. The house was attacked again on the following two nights.

Following the third attack on the students' house in Chelmsley Wood, a 15-year-old boy was arrested on suspicion of criminal damage and possession of a knife. According to the Birmingham Dispatch, the leader of Chelmsley Wood Patriots, Rachel Burbidge, "has been posting on Facebook with extraordinary frequency" since the incident in the park, and has called claims that the attacks on the house were linked to her group "fake news". The newspaper reports that "Insisting that hers is a mission of peace, she strongly denies allegations of criminal damage or intimidation. At one stage she even seemed to suggest the images being circulated of the smashed windows were AI-generated." Burbidge has also stated online that on the night of the incident in the park, members of her group were joined by a group of younger people, who she has described as "ASBOs".

According to Hope Not Hate, members of the Patriot Platform affiliate groups the Greater Manchester Patriots and Protect Our Postcode travelled to France on 22 September "to track asylum seekers".
