= Conservative Democratic Organisation =

Organization within the British Conservative Party

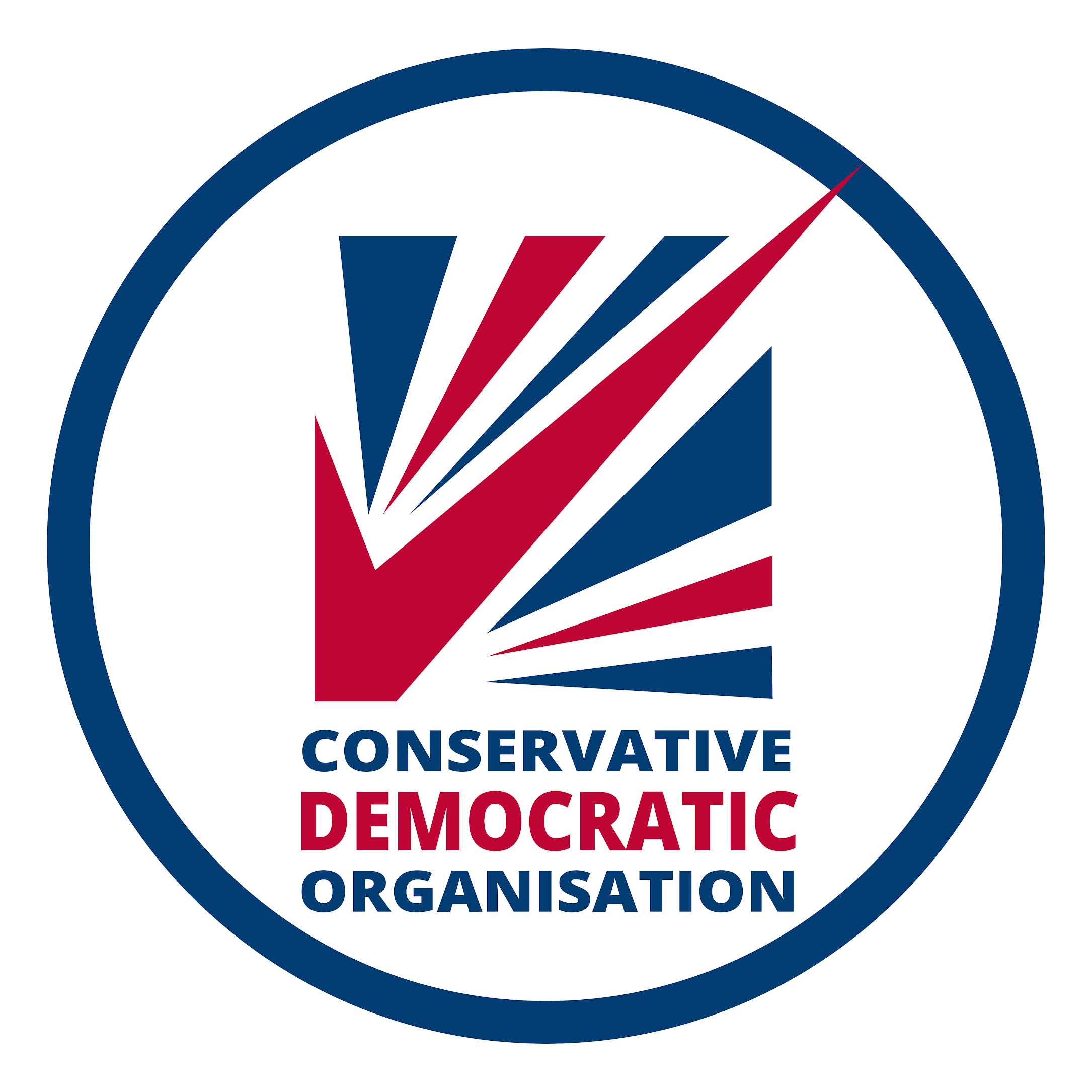
- Abbreviation: CDO
- Formation: 11 December 2022; 3 years ago
- Founders: Baron Greenhalgh, Claire Bullivant
- President: Peter Cruddas
- Vice President: Stephen Greenhalgh
- Chairman: David Campbell Bannerman
- Parent organisation: Conservative Party

The Conservative Democratic Organisation is a grouping within the British Conservative Party. It is widely believed to be aligned with Boris Johnson.

The CDO was launched on 11 December 2022 by Claire Bullivant and Baron Greenhalgh, and is backed by the Conservative peer Lord Peter Cruddas. Its website states that its mission is to "strengthen party democracy by ensuring the Conservative Party is representative of the membership and fairly represents their views", and criticises the October 2022 leadership election process which led to the unopposed "coronation" of Rishi Sunak as Prime Minister. The party was also critical of Sunak's dismissal of Suella Braverman as home secretary in the November 2023 cabinet reshuffle, calling it "political suicide". The group explicitly includes non-Conservative members.

The CDO's first public conference was held on 13 May 2023 in Bournemouth. Priti Patel, formerly Johnson's Home Secretary, gave a keynote address in which she blamed Conservative losses in the 2023 local elections on a disconnect between leadership and the party grassroots and lauded Johnson as a "vote-winning political giant" who she felt was unfairly removed from power by Conservative MPs.
