= Injunctions against Raise the Colours =

Injunction in England

During 2026, two local authorities in England – Oxfordshire County Council and Birmingham City Council – were granted injunctions against members of the group Raise the Colours and others, prohibiting the unauthorised attachment of flags to highways infrastructure in Oxfordshire and Birmingham. Oxfordshire County Council was granted a full injunction in June and Birmingham City Council was granted an interim injunction in November.

== Oxfordshire County Council injunction ==
=== Application and evidence ===
In June 2026 Oxfordshire County Council sought an injunction against the group to prevent them from raising flags on or near public highways, having spent over £15,000 removing over 300 flags from lampposts. The council told the court that its contractors had met "with hostility and obstruction" when removing flags and also noted Raise the Colours' founder Ryan Bridge's arrest on suspicion of causing religiously and racially aggravated harassment in Oxford in April.

Reports that were submitted to the High Court as part of the case included allegations that Ben Cullen had headbutted a highways worker; that highways workers now had to wear unbranded uniforms and drive unbranded vehicles and cover their faces for fear of being attacked; that Raise the Colours supporters had spat at streetlight maintenance workers; that Cullen and Trudy Wells had posted details of council depots online; and that the group had attached trackers to highway workers' vehicles, using them to find out their home addresses, which were then posted online.

=== Granting of the injunction ===
The High Court heard the case on 23 June, granting an injunction against the unauthorised attachment of flags on or near public highways. The council had indicated that it also wanted an additional, specific injunction against four named members of Raise the Colours – Ryan Bridge, Ben Cullen, Trudy Wells and Kevin Good – but opted not pursue this when the four agreed to stop attaching flags to lampposts in Oxfordshire and "also agreed not to encourage others to put flags up, and not to obstruct any council worker or contractor taking them down".

=== Reactions ===
Ryan Bridge stated that the injunction was "horrendous" and that Oxford was "completely finished", saying "We haven't had the result we wanted today, because we want to be able to put up flags of our country wherever we like". Reform UK MP Richard Tice accused the Liberal Democrats, who control the council, of hating patriotism and England. The council leader stated that "We are very explicitly not about banning people who want to fly the flag on their own private property. We fly the flag on our own council buildings and we're very proud to do so".

Two days after giving an undertaking to the court not to put more flags up, Ben Cullen contacted the leader of Oxfordshire County Council on Facebook, telling him:

We are going to fight it all the way now as we have been given the financial backing and the best legal team free of charge And we never had enough [time] to get legal help and u will not be happy when you see who is backing us We win this case watch And I think we can get a petition with millions to back it With just are groups we have over a million followers and that's including Tommy [Robinson] and people like that with there [sic] followers."

=== Confirmation of permanence ===
The injunction was confirmed as permanent by the High Court on 9 July. The judge noted in his judgment that Ben Cullen was "accused of serious criminal offences relating to possession of child pornography", which he had denied, and that Bridge told the hearing that the group "knew nothing about the child pornography allegations".

=== Potential contempt of court ===
On 22 July, the BBC reported that the Attorney General's Office was reviewing footage shared by the group on social media, which had been filmed inside the Royal Courts of Justice, to determine whether it was in the public interest to bring contempt of court charges. The Criminal Justice Act 1925 makes it illegal to take or publish film footage within court precincts in England and Wales.

== Birmingham City Council injunction ==
After the news of the Oxfordshire injunction, some residents of areas of Birmingham where Raise the Colours have put flags up argued that Birmingham City Council and West Midlands Police were "dragging their heels" about pursuing a similar injunction covering Birmingham. A group of residents of Stirchey, where Raise the Colours put up flags in September 2025 and had returned several times after local people took them down, had had a series of online meetings with the council and the West Midlands Police and Crime Commissioner, Simon Foster, starting in March 2026, pushing for action against the flagging group. A Birmingham Green Party councillor told The Guardian in July that the council was in a "quagmire" over the issue but that "There's a huge amount of evidence of the aggressive, intimidating, violent behaviour of Raise the Colours and that is being used to request an injunction against that organisation".

=== Application and evidence ===
On 26 August 2026, Birmingham City Council applied to the High Court for an injunction to prevent Ryan Bridge, Elliott Stanley, Julian Keane, Ross Child, Billy Allison, Ben Cullen, Mark Keating and "persons unknown" from putting up flags, as part of its "ongoing work to manage unauthorised attachments on the highway, including flags, banners and signage". The Birmingham Mail reported that "In its submissions to the court, the council will say it had witnessed incidents that involved harassment, intimidation or obstruction during removal activity". The council stated that it was pursuing an injunction as a "last resort" after it had "sought voluntary compliance" from Raise the Colours without success.

In documents filed with the court by Birmingham City Council, it stated that its highways contractor Kier Group was "no longer willing to deploy operatives for [removing flags] due to concerns regarding health and safety" owing to threats and intimidation. The council stated that an alternative contractor was quoting £132 per flag for removals, and that it estimated that there were 20,000 flags that had been raised in the city, meaning it was facing a £2.6 million bill for their removal. The council's Director of Highways and Infrastructure stated that the council could not afford this and that it would divert resources from other, vital tasks. The manager of the council's community safety partnership stated that the council was not "taking sides" but that when opposed or questioned, Raise the Colours "respond with aggression, intimidation and, in some cases, violence....this has resulted in many people feeling unsafe in their own homes and increased tension within local communities". He confirmed that "there have been instances of Palestinian flags being flown from street infrastructure and the council is also seeking to prevent these flags, and any other attachment depicting a flag, being erected on highway furniture or infrastructure without prior authorisation". The documents also included a statement from West Midlands Police that flagging activity had "created a sustained and disproportionate demand upon [our] resources".

In a witness statement, the council's executive director of operations stated "For the avoidance of doubt, the (council) does not seek to restrict the defendants from affixing flags to their own private property...residential or commercial premises". Answering questions on a phone-in programme on BBC Radio WM, the council leader, Liberal Democrat Roger Harmer, said that the council was not banning national flags and that those people wanting to see more flags in their ward should speak to their local councillor to ask for one to be flown from council property, saying "If you have a library with a flag pole, engage with your local councillor, let's see if we can get more flags up legitimately".

The group Brummies United Against Racism and Hate Crime welcomed the news of the injunction application and said that it had been assisting the council in collating evidence of Raise the Colours members' "thuggish behaviour". The group said that it hoped that, if awarded, the injunction would "prohibit further flagging activity, limit RTC’s... behaviour, and ultimately restore the nation’s flag as a true symbol of unity". Local Reform UK councillors criticised the council's actions, calling the proposed injunction "extraordinary" and "not a priority for residents". Ryan Bridge called the council's evidence and the witness statements submitted to the court "99 per cent lies" and said that "The majority of people here (in Birmingham) are pro flag and pro British, and you can see the love I get. It's that horrible 5 per cent, the liberal middle class left, who object and say not in my neighbourhood".

After it was reported that the council was applying for an injunction, false claims circulated on social media that the council was seeking an outright ban on the flying of national flags. Elon Musk called the council "traitors". A council spokesperson told Reuters "We are not stopping people flying flags on their property".

=== Hearings ===
Sitting at the High Court in Birmingham on 8 September, a judge adjourned the case for three weeks. Bridge, Stanley and Keane attended the hearing. Prior to the court sitting, "there was a brief, hostile exchange between Bridge and Stanley, who had co-founded Raise the Colours before apparently falling out". In court, Bridge and Stanley "sat a row of seats apart and did not speak to each other". Keating and Childs did not attend as they were at work and on holiday respectively. Allison appeared briefly by video link from custody as he was awaiting trial for murder; he chose to leave the room he was appearing from before the judge spoke to him and did not appear again during the injunction hearings. Cullen "sent a message to the city council to say he did not wish to contribute to the hearing or have anything to do with activities in Birmingham". Bridge, Stanley and Keane indicated that they were willing to make legal undertakings not to participate in further flagging in the city. The council's barrister said that the authority was willing to accept these undertakings from Stanley and Keane but not at that stage from Bridge. He acknowledged that Oxfordshire County Council had accepted such an undertaking from Bridge, but said: "His involvement is considerably more central. The activity in Birmingham has been at a level that is a different order of magnitude to that which took place in Oxfordshire. There has been significantly more anti-social behaviour, threats and intimidation." Stanley and Keane signed agreements not to engage in or encourage flagging or to intimidate or abuse those who oppose flagging, for an interim period before the full injunction hearing. Neither was required to attend the adjourned hearing.

According to the Birmingham Mail, at the first hearing, the judge "appeared to criticise the council for not clearly setting out the case against each of the seven named men". The judge said: "I conclude that the fair thing to do is to relist the case and for the council to set out more clearly the case against each defendant". Brummies United Against Racism and Hate Crime expressed its disappointment at the adjournment, stating "It is incredibly frustrating that this interim injunction is now delayed" and "We hope that the council and their legal team will prepare the evidence carefully and present it ready for the next hearing".

New paperwork submitted to the court by Birmingham City Council ahead of the 30 September hearing stated that "The authority is of the view that the behaviour, for which there is no lawful basis, will, if not prevented by way of an injunction, continue to escalate. It is highly likely that such behaviour will ultimately lead to serious injury or death, and further disruption to and division within its local communities." The council reiterated its intention that the injunction would apply to flags of all types, not just Union and St George Cross flags.

The council's paperwork highlighted a number of incidents as evidence against Bridge, including that he and other Raise the Colours members filmed and shouted "eat your pizza you greedy pig" at a woman in a restaurant who had objected to them putting up flags in Moseley, that he called opposing his actions "traitors" and mocked their appearance, speech and other traits, that the Raise the Colours cherrypicker was parked on double yellow lines, blocked pavements and obstructed pedestrians and traffic, and that in Stirchley, "a member of the public suffered a broken leg following a collision with the cherry picker used by the defendants to install flags". The council also noted that after being served with court papers before the first hearing, Bridge had recorded himself saying "I ain’t giving up, I ain’t stopping, I ain’t doing Oxford on this one" and "We don’t want to rollover like we done Oxford, it’s not my style, I don’t give up and I don’t give in." The council stated that this demonstrated that Bridge did not intend to abide by the proposed injunction. When delivering his case papers to the council on 25 September, Bridge broadcast a video to social media in which "he revealed a section of his paperwork stating he wished to make an undertaking not to put up flags in future".

At the 30 September hearing, the council presented its case but there was not time for Bridge's defence counsel to present his submission, so the case was adjourned again until 2 November. Child and Keating signed legal undertakings to not raise flags in future, meaning that the council's case was then against Bridge, Cullen (who indicated that he was not interested in attending and that he severed his links with Ryan Bridge and the Birmingham branch of Raise the Colours) and "persons unknown". At the 2 November hearing, Bridge's lawyer told the court that that putting up flags was an expression of Bridge's political views that should be regarded as protected by the European Convention on Human Rights. He argued that "An expression of article 11 [of the ECHR] will inevitably involve some disruption. The authorities do have to tolerate that to some extent". The council's lawyer argued that there were "other ways" that Bridge could protest without attaching flags to highway infrastructure and that the evidence against Bridge demonstrated that there was "significantly more" activity than Bridge admitted to. Three local men, Adam Biggs, Mark Hudson and Tony Kaye, joined the case in order to oppose the injunction, representing "persons unknown". They expressed concerns that the proposed injunction would ban people from flying flags for pride and other causes and might criminalise the attachment of lost cat posters and adverts for local events to lampposts. Judgment in the case was reserved.

=== Judgment and reactions ===
On 18 November, the judge issued her written decision, granting Birmingham City Council an interim prohibitory injunction banning Ryan Bridge, Ben Cullen and "persons unknown" from attaching flags to public infrastructure without permission and granting power of arrest should Bridge or "persons unknown" break the order.

Upon issuing her judgment, the judge noted the "very emotive language" that had surrounded the case and stated: "The interim injunction needs to be understood for what it is. It is not the Court nor the (council) ‘banning the Union Jack’ or the display of Pride flags or anything of the like. Whilst the interim injunction order will cover flags of all types, it is limited in scope to the restraint of unauthorised flags attached to highway street furniture or infrastructure, and to the restraint of associated conduct, within the administrative area of Birmingham. There are many different ways in which flags of all types can still be displayed in Birmingham." The judge stated that concerns that the injunction would unduly restrict free expression were "unwarranted".

Addressing the submissions made by Adam Biggs and Mark Hudson, representing "persons" unknown, the judge wrote that these "were both articulate and passionate" but clarified the scope of the injunction: "However, many of the concerns they expressed about not being able to fly flags from their homes or walking down the highway wearing t-shirts with Pride flags are unfounded. The proposed order would not prevent such behaviour. Similarly, it would not prevent the ‘missing cat’ type of notice being attached to a street lamp, as it is not a flag."

After the announcement of the granting of the interim injunction, Ryan Bridge posted a video on Facebook, in which he said that he was "gutted" and "devastated" by the decision, including the granting of powers of arrest. He said that Raise the Colours was "not about race, colour, creed" but about opposing "illegal invaders breaking in our country, jeopardising our borders, on the rubber dinghies". He said that he was considering an appeal against the judgment.

The council's cabinet member for equalities, communities and social justice, Jane Baston of the Green Party, welcomed the decision, calling it an "important step" in tackling unauthorised attachments and noting that residents remained free to display flags on their private property. Robert Alden, leader of Birmingham's Conservative Party councillors, criticised the council's decision to apply for the injunction, saying it should instead be focused on improving basic public services and resolving a long-running refuse collection strike. The Reform UK leader on the council, Jex Parkin, said the council had its "priorities entirely wrong" and accused it of pursuing an "ideologically driven case against residents proudly displaying our national flags – at huge public expense". Brummies United Against Racism and Hate Crime welcomed the judgment, calling it "a welcome decision and long overdue".

The Birmingham Mail's politics and people editor, Jane Haynes, wrote that despite the fact that the judge "reiterated at least twice" in her judgment that the Union and St George's flags were not being banned, but rather only the unlawful attachment of flags to street furniture, "That hasn’t stopped local and national politicians claiming the ban as an attack on the national flag, parroting Bridge in doing so".

When interviewed by Haynes an hour after the issuing of the interim injunction, Bridge suggested that she must have a "back door" to the courts and council, stating that he had not received a copy of the judgment. Haynes writes that the judgment "was released simultaneously by the court to every ‘interested party’ who had registered with the court, including the council, defendants and media".

=== Consequential hearing ===
The day after the judgment had been issued, a follow-up, "consequential" hearing was held. Bridge attended the hearing without his barrister, who the court was told was working on another case in London. The judge asked Bridge "Why did you not tell your barrister on November 10 that the hearing was today?" and said that "I'm lost at why your barrister is accepting other work". Bridge was told that the interim injunction had now come into force and would remain in place until a trial took place or there was a further court order. He told the judge that he thought the matter was over for the defendants who had agreed to undertakings to comply, asking "And now it's going to trial?" The judge told him that the court's position "has never changed" and that "This has always been about the interim injunction". Bridge was told that if the council sought to make the injunction permanent, the trial could take three to fours days, and he responded that "It's spiralling out of control, isn't it?", adding that he did not "want to exploit any more of the public purse and the council's money". The judge said that the court would encourage the parties to the case to reach a resolution without the need for a trial.

Bridge asked for clarification on what was meant by "encouragement", relating to the injunction prohibiting him from encouraging others to attach flags to street furniture, telling the court "If I say 'your flag looks nice' I could be encouraging somebody and go to jail for two years". The judge responded by that the word "encourage" was routinely included in injunctions and that she was not willing to go over the wording any further with Bridge, stating "It's everyday expressions in the English language". Bridge said: "Because they're everyday words, it's quite worrying for me and everyday people."

At the post-judgment hearing, the judge also reiterated that the injunction was "not the court nor the claimant 'banning the union jack' or the display of Pride flags or anything of the like" and that while it applied to all types of flag, it only related to those attached without authorisation to street furniture.
