= International Day of Birmingham =

International Day of Birmingham is an annual festival held in Birmingham in the United Kingdom. The event celebrates the city's cultural diversity, civic pride and connections to the 18 other Birminghams around the world. It was established in 2024 as part of the Sky TV series Joe Lycett's United States of Birmingham and is now delivered by the International Day of Birmingham Community Interest Company.

== 2024 edition ==
Joe Lycett and the Lord Mayor of Birmingham designated 24 September as the International Day of Birmingham. The event featured a collective chant of "Alright Bab", featuring local people and delegates from other Birminghams around the world, with which Lycett signed "friendship agreements" on his United States of Birmingham programme. A new flag designed by Lycett for the "United States of Birmingham" was unveiled.

== 2025 edition ==
The 2025 edition was on 24 September and featured celebrations at venues and locations across the city. It began with a "flashbab-flashmob" and an "Alright Bab" chant led by the Lord Mayor as well as a flag raising in Victoria Square. Activities included a photography exhibition, film screening, a papier-mâché Mr Egg making session as part of a Mr Eggshibition, and a six kilometre running tour of the city. Buildings around the city were lit up to celebrate.

== 2026 edition ==
The 2026 event took place on 24–25 September, growing to include a second day. Ten rooms in the Council House were transformed into a cultural space under the banner "the House That Brum Built". Atendees were issued with a "Brummie Passport" with stamps to complete. Activities included a mini film festival and workshops run by local designers.

The 2026 edition featured the debut of Re-Union Jack, a large union flag made of worn and ripped polyester flags removed from lampposts in the city, sewn and stuck together by participants in a three-month community project, led by a Birmingham-based textile artist. The flag features signatures signatures of local figures, including a descendant of James Watt and members of bands Steel Pulse and UB40. The flags had originally been put up on lampposts as part of Operation Raise the Colours and the artist said that the project was a reaction to Raise the Colours' flag-raising, which "has caused division in communities across the country". She described the reimagined flags as "covered in the names of influential people in the Midlands who mean a lot to people and who make the Midlands this magical melting pot that we have".
