= Claire Bullivant =

British political campaigner and journalist

Chief Executive of the Great British PAC
- Incumbent
- Assumed office 4 September 2024
- Preceded by: Office established

Personal details
- Born: December 1979 (age 46) Redditch, England
- Party: Conservative
- Other political affiliations: Great British PAC (since 2024)
- Occupation: Political campaigner, journalist

Claire Dorothy Bullivant is a British political campaigner and journalist, who is the founder and owner of the Great British PAC, a far-right pressure group. She was also involved in founding the Conservative Democratic Organisation, a grassroots organisation within the Conservative Party.

== Political career ==
=== Journalism ===
Bullivant lives in both Los Angeles and in the Redditch, writing for a number of local newspapers in the West Midlands, owned by her family. In 2020, she launched The Conservative Post (later renamed as the Conservative and Reformer Post), a right-wing media platform.

=== Conservative Party activism ===
In 2022, Bullivant and Baron Greenhalgh co-founded the Conservative Democratic Organisation (CDO), which is aligned to Boris Johnson. The following year, she told LBC that the partygate scandal had been a 'witch-hunt' from the left.

At the 2024 Conservative Party leadership election, she expressed support for Suella Braverman to run as leader of the Conservative Party.

In May 2026, Bullivant wrote to party leader Kemi Badenoch expressing concern over the suspension of the Conservative group leader in Worcestershire, who had been suspended as a result of entering a four-party coalition which included Green Party councillors.

=== Chief executive of the Great British PAC ===
According to Hope not Hate, in September 2024, Bullivant established the Great British PAC, a far-right campaign group modelled after American political action committees. The group stated it was a cross-party movement which intents to 'unite the right' before the next general election. Its chairman is Ben Habib, the former Deputy Leader of Reform UK, and its governed by an advisory board which includes two House of Lords peers, and one Member of Parliament.

The group has campaigned primarily against the Chagos Deal, and in July 2025 it alleged that the government was engaged in covert deals with Greece over the return of the Elgin Marbles. Bullivant is the owner and chief executive of the organisation.

In June 2026, Advance UK, a far-right political party, was merged into the Great British PAC, a move which led to conflict between party leader Ben Habib (along with Bullivant), and the chief operating officer, Tim Power.
