= Far-right politics in the United Kingdom =

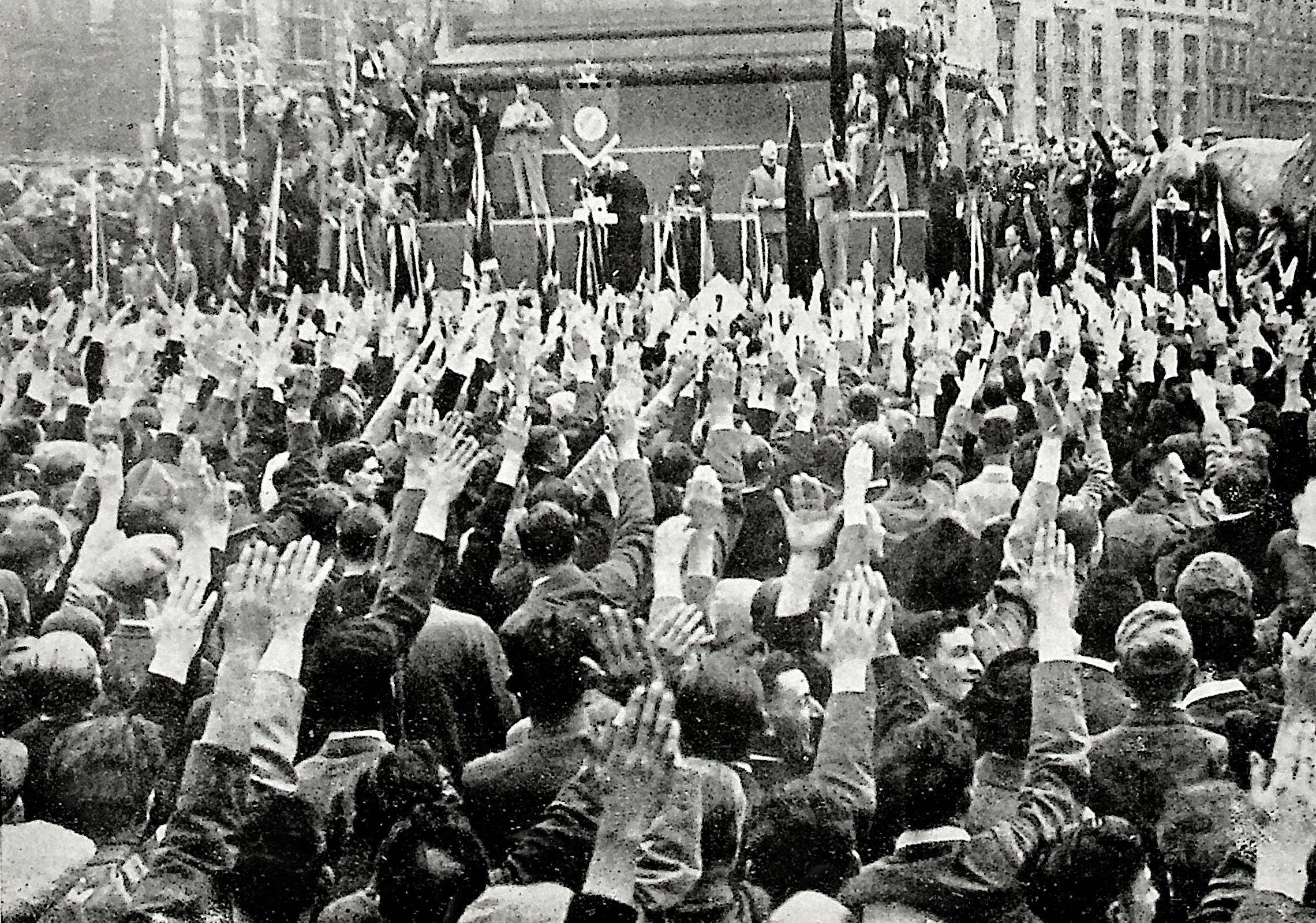
British fascists doing the fascist salute at a 1938 demonstration in Trafalgar Square

Far-right politics have been present in the United Kingdom since the early 20th century, with the formation of fascist, antisemitic, or Islamophobic movements. The far-right is an umbrella term that can encompass a diversity of ideologies, ranging from populist to neo-Nazi, and is commonly distinguished between the radical right and fascism. In the UK, the radical right generally accepts electoral democracy while challenging aspects of liberal democracy, whereas the extreme right rejects democratic principles and includes fascist and Neo-Nazi movements. However, some scholarship identifies an historical and ideological link between the two groups, including in Britain. Since the 21st century, far-right terrorism from the British extreme right has become a growing threat which includes cultural nationalism, white nationalism and white supremacist ideologies.

Early examples of far right politics in Britain include the formation of British Fascisti by Rotha Lintorn-Orman in 1923, inspired by Benito Mussolini's fascism in Italy, and Oswald Mosley's British Union of Fascists (BUF), founded in 1932. The best known episode involving the BUF occurred in 1936 when antifascists prevented the group from marching through the East End of London, as part of the Battle of Cable Street. After the wartime ban of the BUF, Mosley founded the Union Movement in 1948, and in 1954, A. K. Chesterton founded the League of Empire Loyalists (LEL), with both groups maintaining a focus on the global Jewish conspiracy.

The league then merged into the National Front (NF) in the 1960s, along with the first iteration of the British National Party formed in 1960. The NF subsequently became the largest post-war far-right party, boosted by the Rivers of Blood speech given by Enoch Powell in 1968, and experienced a rise in popularity during the 1970s. John Tyndall then launched another version of the British National Party (BNP) in the 1980s. By the mid to late 20th century, the far right had become dominated by white nationalist organisations that opposed non-white immigration. In the 1990s, with the NF beginning its decline, the BNP found electoral success in local elections. In 1992 the BNP then formed Combat 18, a neo-Nazi militant wing of the party, and by the end of the decade, Nick Griffin replaced Tyndall as BNP leader. During the 2000s, the BNP grew in popularity under Griffin. In 2009 the party gained two MEPs, reaching an electoral peak in the 2010 general election with 1.9% of the vote; meanwhile, the NF continued its decline.

The 2010s saw the rise of the English Defence League (EDL), National Action, and Britain First. With the EDL seeing rapid growth, the UK Independence Party (UKIP) started to gain popularity soon after, while the NF continued declining and the BNP vote share collapsed in the 2015 general election. Two years prior, UKIP leader Nigel Farage said that his party absorbed much of the BNP's former voters, with support peaking for the party in 2015. Former BNP members also joined the newly formed English Democrats and British Democratic Party. In 2017, UKIP lost their final MP with Farage departing the party the following year. In 2019 he launched the Brexit Party, which renamed to Reform UK in 2021, and won five seats in the 2024 general election.

In 2020, Europol reported that the UK had the highest number of far-right terrorist attacks and plots in Europe during the previous year. That same year, National Action became the first far-right group proscribed under the Terrorism Act, and the first banned since the Second World War, and the white nationalist group Patriotic Alternative (PA) was established, later splitting to form the Homeland Party in 2023. The following year, far-right riots occurred in England and Northern Ireland, the worst disorder in the UK in over a decade, involving racist attacks, arson, and looting. 2025 then saw anti-immigration protests and a flag-raising campaign, supported by far-right groups and individuals including Britain First and EDL founder Tommy Robinson. Restore Britain split from Reform UK. In 2026, having split from Raise the Colours, Danny Tommo founded the anti-immigration group Patriot Platform.

== Terminology ==
According to the Centre for Research and Evidence on Security Threats (CREST), in the UK, far-right is an umbrella term for various groups located to the right of mainstream politics. CREST wrote that the term can encompass a diversity of ideologies, and often in a politicised way, is used to label groups ranging from populist political parties to neo-Nazi cells. While the term far-right is often associated with fascism, not all far-right groups are fascist, instead some have adopted liberal arguments.

The radical right has been categorised by scholars as belonging to a subset of far-right politics, distinguished from the extreme right. CREST reported that 'radical' and 'extreme' are regularly used to distinguish between far-right groups: the radical right-wing groups, those working within democratic processes that share a common ideology with the far-right, and the extreme right, who oppose parliamentary democracy. Far-right has also been described as the range between the violent extremism of the extreme right and the illiberal populism of the radical right.

Since 2008, the term 'far right' has been increasingly invoked by scholars, as an umbrella term, based on nativist and authoritarian politics between the extreme right and radical right. As of 2022, this usage has also been reflected within the public sphere, the media, and among governing leaders. Concerned with normalising illiberalism by reducing the label to only applying to violent "old-school" white supremacists, professor Nigel Copsey wrote that at its core "all those who comprise the far right share a common chauvinistic and exclusionary nationalism, whether cultural, ethnic or racial". In 2026, Copsey attributed the ambiguity of the term 'far right' partly to the fragmented nature of organisations in the UK, along with the rejection of the term by far-right figures.

In the British Journal of Politics & International Relations, Alice Silbey categorises the post-war fascist movement as splitting into three: the "revolutionary ultranationalists" (otherwise referred to as fascists), the ethnopluralists, and the less extreme groups that are "compatible with liberal democracy". According to Silbey, the far-right are focused on identity, race, and immigration; they accept nativism, inequality, and authoritarianism; and are made up of "both democratic and anti-democratic extremists".

According to CREST, with formally organised groups, the origins of such organisations are sometimes used to interpret conclusions, while manifestos and affiliations with other political parties can help to clarify political positions. Often there is limited information available about such groups and the information is contested, examples include the attempted transition of the BNP from racism to cultural nationalism and populism. With less formalised groups, a greater emphasis can be placed on statements and activities of its members, in absence of further information. The terminology far-right is also used in popular debate to make political arguments, with the politicisation of the term making analysis more difficult.

=== New far-right ===
In 2023, Silbey described a "New Far-Right", based on an anti-Islam (or counter-jihad) framework and distinguished from the "traditional right" by means of opposing fascism, as being defined by "an aggressive opposition to Islam, support of democracy, use of social media, ultra-patriotism, critique of mainstream politics, and the adoption of some liberal values".

The EDL has been described as being part of the European 'new far-right', with scholars identifying the groups ideology as being "a new iteration of traditional far right politics", within a broader ideology of Islamophobia. In 2011, Dr Paul Jackson noted different fractions of the EDL blurring the lines regarding moderate Muslims and radical Islam, while the official EDL narrative was to at minimum try and distinguish between the two, rather than to characterise the religion in its entirety.

=== Radical right ===
In the 2020s, UKIP and Reform UK (formerly the Brexit Party) were labelled as radical right, while the categorisation of the BNP remains disputed. In West European Politics, Martin, Scott, & Kappe, based the classification of the three parties on their "traditional, authoritarian, and nationalist" characteristics.

In Parliamentary Affairs, Bennie & Widfeldt categorised Reform UK as fitting "into a broader European family of radical right parties working within democratic structures". In British Politics, Hayton placed this as "outside of the mainstream right and as part of the far right, but distinguishes it from the extreme right elements of the far right."

In the Australian Journal of Politics and History, LeCras argued that, prior to 2016 and the EU referendum, the emergence of the radical right in the UK can be ideologically traced back to the rise of UKIP, originating from the "radical traditions of English conservatism", as opposed to the fascist origins of the extreme right. Additionally, that "the ideological interests of conservative populists and right‐wing extremists in the United Kingdom have frequently intersected — and that this blurring of the boundaries is likely to continue in future manifestations of the country's populist radical right". LeCras further wrote that prior to Brexit there was "some uncertainty among political scientists as to what British parties could be included within the populist radical right‐wing family", with Cas Mudde in 2016 predicting that UKIP would "gravitate further to the radical right" after the result of the EU referendum. In 2020, LeCras said that UKIP had been "broadly accepted as the exemplar of radical right‐wing populism in Britain", whereas BNP remains contested (or "borderline" according to Mudde), based on "its historical connection with neo‐fascism and the extreme right". According to CREST, with the BNP serving as an example, there are concerns that "distinguishing between radical and extreme groups serves to gloss over the extreme roots of many of the groups now considered radical, potentially legitimising them."

== History ==
=== 1920s to 1960s ===
==== British Fascisti ====
Founder of British Fascisti, Rotha Lintorn-Orman, in 1916

One of the earliest examples of fascism in the UK can be traced back to the formation of the British Fascisti (BF) in May 1923 by First World War veteran Rotha Lintorn-Orman, with Robert Blakeney serving as president of the organisation until 1926. The group later renamed to become the British Fascists. Guided by Mussolini’s Italy and influenced by staunch British conservatives, the BF attempted to portray themselves as advocates for British heritage and tradition, alongside liberal tradition. The BF argued that "The purpose of Fascism in England is to lead thought, not to compel obedience. It was to preserve liberty that Fascism came into existence". The BF believed that, in opposition to communism that threatened British traditions, fascism was a progression force and a means of preserving freedom of speech, despite the inherent contradictions.

According to The Daily Herald, the 1923 United Kingdom general election and formation of the first Labour government, caused the 'events in the British Fascisti movement to speed up considerably'. Unverified claims were made of 27,000 supporters across the country, with 3,000 in London. Government intelligence officials reported that this figure however included active and inactive members, along with sympathisers who occasionally worked with the BF. The estimated number of active members by security services was placed around a few thousand, of which, around 1,800 participated in a large Armistice Day rally in November 1924. After a memo referencing violence at public meetings, the group were considered a threat by February 1925. Security officials noted members referring to 'the day' in which the BF would install a dictatorship by seizing power, placing doubt on the claims to be a constitutional movement.

In 1925, 100 activists split from the BF to form the National Fascisti, as an ideologically more hardline group. Another split then occurred in the lead up to the 1926 general strike, regarding how the BF would assist the government in response to the strike. Blakeney's splinter were willing to support parliamentary democracy in order to join the National Citizens Union, as part of accepting Home Secretary William Joynson-Hicks' compromise. In the end Lintorn-Orman narrowly won the vote but the party remained fractured and continued its decline after the general strike until its dissolution in 1935. The party had also become further excluded on the far-right after the formation of the BUF in 1932. In the 1930s, the BF drifted further towards German National Socialism, moving away from the coded phrasing of 'alien immigration' and instead towards a focus on explicit anti-Semitic propaganda.

==== British Union of Fascists ====
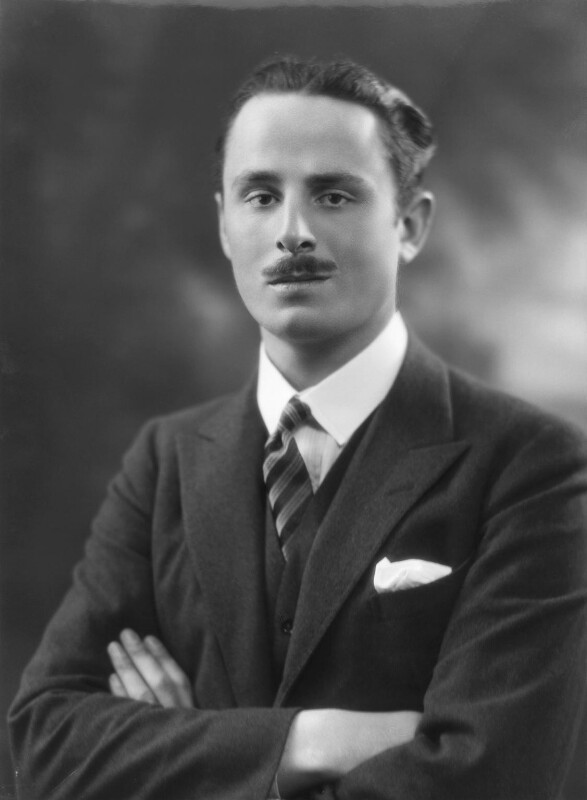
Founder of the British Union of Fascists and later the Union Movement, Oswald Mosley, in 1922

The British far right rose out of the fascist movement. In 1932, Oswald Mosley founded the British Union of Fascists, which was banned during the Second World War. The party peaked in popularity in mid-1934 with approximately 50,000 members, only to plummet to 5,000 members by late 1935. By the outbreak of the war, the party had recovered to 22,500 members, but remained an underachieving fascist group.

The most famous episode involving the BUF was the Battle of Cable Street, which occurred in October 1936, after the party announced a march to celebrate the fourth anniversary of the organisation. The increasingly antisemitic BUF chose East London as the location, a decision regarded as deliberately provocative as the area was then home to Britain's largest Jewish community. The Home Secretary declined appeals for the march to be banned, leading to approximately 100,000 to 300,000 people to take to the streets in an attempt to block the route.

The fascists assembled at Tower Hill, where there were clashes between the BUF and counter-protesters. The Police separated the two sides and attempted to clear a route through either Aldgate or Cable Street for the marchers to take. They failed in this, frustrated by a both passive and direct resistance. The BUF got no further than Tower Hill, and the Police, wishing avoid further disorder, instructed Mosley to leave the East End, and march to the West End instead.

The Battle was a heavy psychological blow to the BUF and undermined Mosley's authority among senior party figures, leading to resignations, sackings and splits in the months that followed. The BUF also lost prestige with Mussolini and Italian funding began to dry up, leading the BUF to identify more closely with Hitler.

A flowchart showing the history of the early British fascist movement

Following the wartime ban, Mosley founded the Union Movement in 1948, the year after India achieved independence from Britain. The movement aimed to curb decolonisation, concerned with the diminishing powers of European imperialism, such as in Africa. It was following this that far-right groups became more prevalent. Mosley argued that fascism was the only possible way to save Britain from socio-economic ruin and a communist takeover.

During the 1950s and 1960s, the landscape of extreme right groups continued to evolve with the emergence of organisations such as the League of Empire Loyalists (LEL) and the National Front (NF). The rise of far-right ideologies during this period can be attributed, in part, to the dismantling of the British Empire, due to a sense of national decline.

==== League of Empire Loyalists ====
Founded in 1954 by A. K. Chesterton, the League of Empire Loyalists (LEL) became the main British far right group at the time. The LEL believed that the British empire brought around a sense of "pride and joy" and so aimed to "force upon existing parties favourable to national and imperial survival," with the hope to see a return of the "British world... at home and abroad." The LEL was a pressure group rather than a political party, and did not contest elections. Most of its members were part of the Conservative Party, and they were known for politically embarrassing stunts at party conferences. Additionally, throughout its time, LEL was involved in many non-violent protests, which involved heckling speakers.

Along with the Union Movement, a global Jewish conspiracy behind the dismantling of the British empire was central to the beliefs of the group. However, in contrast to the Union Movement that promoted new imperialism with the formation of a collaborative European colonial power, LEL cherished the traditional British empire, instead desiring Britain to re-establish imperial control. Despite this diversity of views, both groups failed to mobilise a mass movement of political support.

In 1958, with power transferred from Mosley to the LEL, the White Defence League (WDL) and the National Labour Party (NLP) emerged. Both groups would then merge into the neo-fascist British National Party (BNP) two years later, led by former leaders of the WDL and NLP; Andrew Fountaine, Colin Jordan, and John Bean. The BNP, which attracted up to 200 supporters, campaigned against what they described as "the Black invasion of Britain", before being absorbed into the NF by 1967. According to Hope not Hate, "despite antisemitism remaining at its core, anti-immigrant and anti-black racism began to take centre stage".

=== 1970s to 1990s ===
==== National Front ====
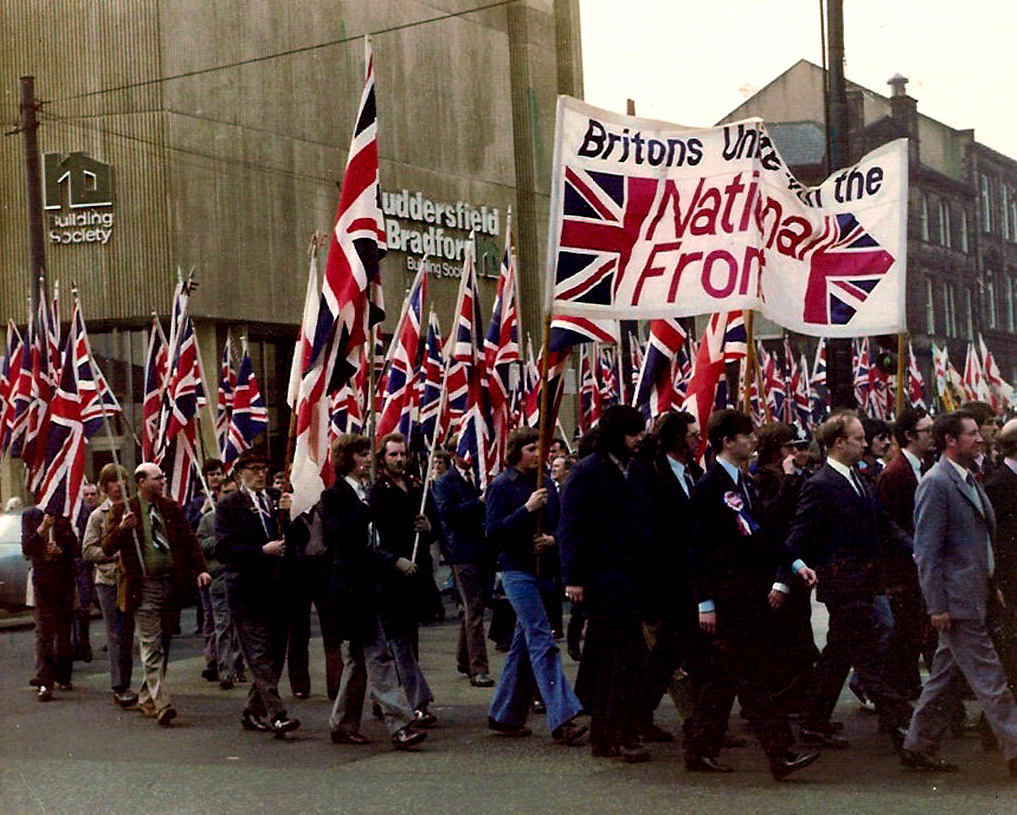
A National Front march in Yorkshire during the 1970s

The National Front (NF) quickly became Britain's largest far-right party post-war, boosted in popularity by the Rivers of Blood speech given by Enoch Powell in 1968. Founded by A. K. Chesterton, the NF was formed from the merging of the LEL, the Bean's BNP, the Racial Preservation Society, and the Greater Britain Movement, that was at the time led by Tyndall. The NF opposed the mass-migration of non-white migrants throughout the 1970s and was able to boost its popularity through the opposition to the immigration rules introduced by Edward Heath, leader of the Conservative and Unionist Party and prime minister, which saw a boost to their membership, to an estimated 17,500 by 1972.

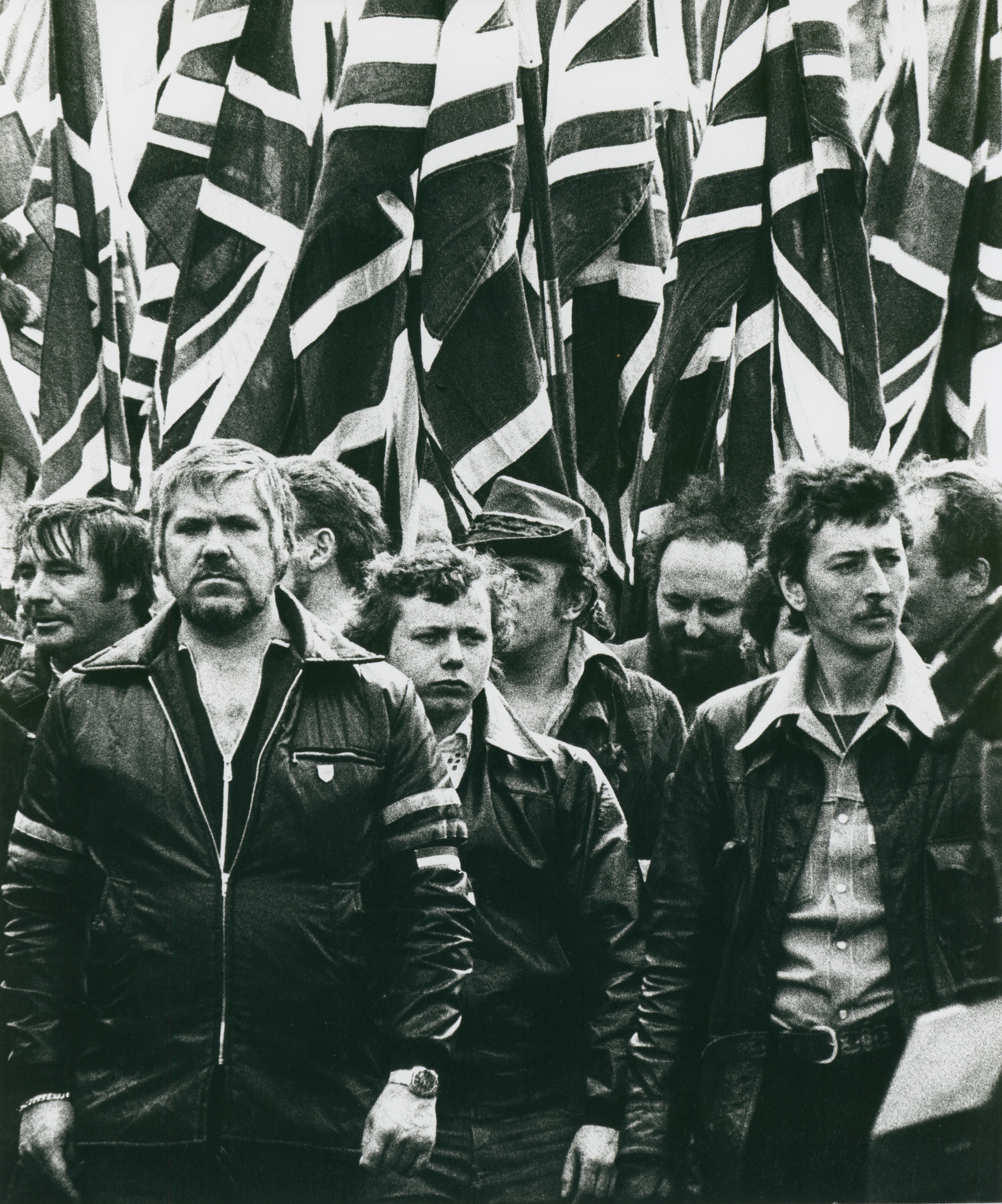
The National Front march as part of the Battle of Lewisham, 1977

Throughout the 1970s, the NF saw a rise in popularity and influence, mainly at a local level; for example, in the 1973 West Bromwich by-election the NF won 16 per cent. They finished third in three by-elections, although these results were atypical of the country as a whole. The party supported extreme loyalism in Northern Ireland, and attracted Conservative Party members who had become disillusioned after Harold Macmillan had recognised the right to independence of the African colonies, and had criticised Apartheid in South Africa. During the 1970s, the NF's rallies became a regular feature of British politics. Election results remained strong in a few working class urban areas, with a number of local council seats won, but the party never came anywhere near winning representation in parliament. Throughout its active years, the NF were involved in several violent incidences, notably the 1974 Red Lion Square disorders, over the amnesty of illegal immigrants and the 1977 'Battle of Lewisham', which aimed to intimidate local minority residents.

In 1983, the political soldiers, supported by Nick Griffin, known as the radicals, gradually gained control of the party and pursued the politics of the Third Way, a specific strain of neofascist ideology that embraced radicals such as Louis Farrakhan. Integrated with the European neofascist movement, the political soldiers advocated for ethnonationalism and "the death of Europe". On the other hand, the older generation split to form the National Front Support Group, also known as the Flag Group.

==== British National Party ====
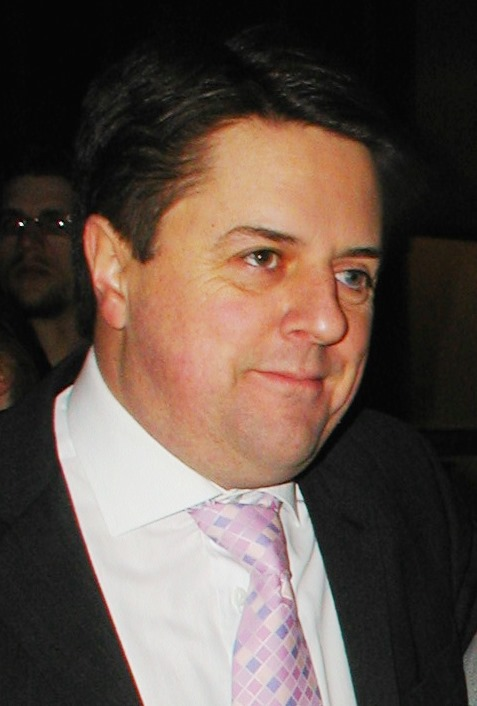
Nick Griffin in 2016, who led the British National Party from 1999 to 2014

John Tyndall formed the New National Front in 1980, and changed its name to the British National Party (BNP) in 1982. They, alongside the Conservative Monday Club, campaigned against the increasing integration of the UK into the European Union. However, with Thatcher in her prime and Tyndall's reputation of a 'brutal, street fighting background' and his admiration for Hitler and the Nazis prevented the party from gaining any respectability.

The BNP have had a number of local councillors in some inner-city areas of East London, and towns in Yorkshire and Lancashire, such as Burnley and Keighley. East London has been the bedrock of far-right support in the UK since the 1930s, whereas BNP success in the north of England was a newer phenomenon. The only other part of the country to provide any significant level of support for such views is the West Midlands.

There was some success in 1993, BNP scored its first electoral success when Derek Beackon won a council vote seat on the Isle of Dogs with 34 per cent vote. They developed a policy of eschewing the traditional far right methods of extra-parliamentary movements, and concentrated instead on the ballot box. Nick Griffin replaced Tyndall as BNP leader in 1999 and introduced several policies to make the party more electable. Repatriation of ethnic minorities was made voluntary and several other policies were moderated.

==== Combat 18 ====
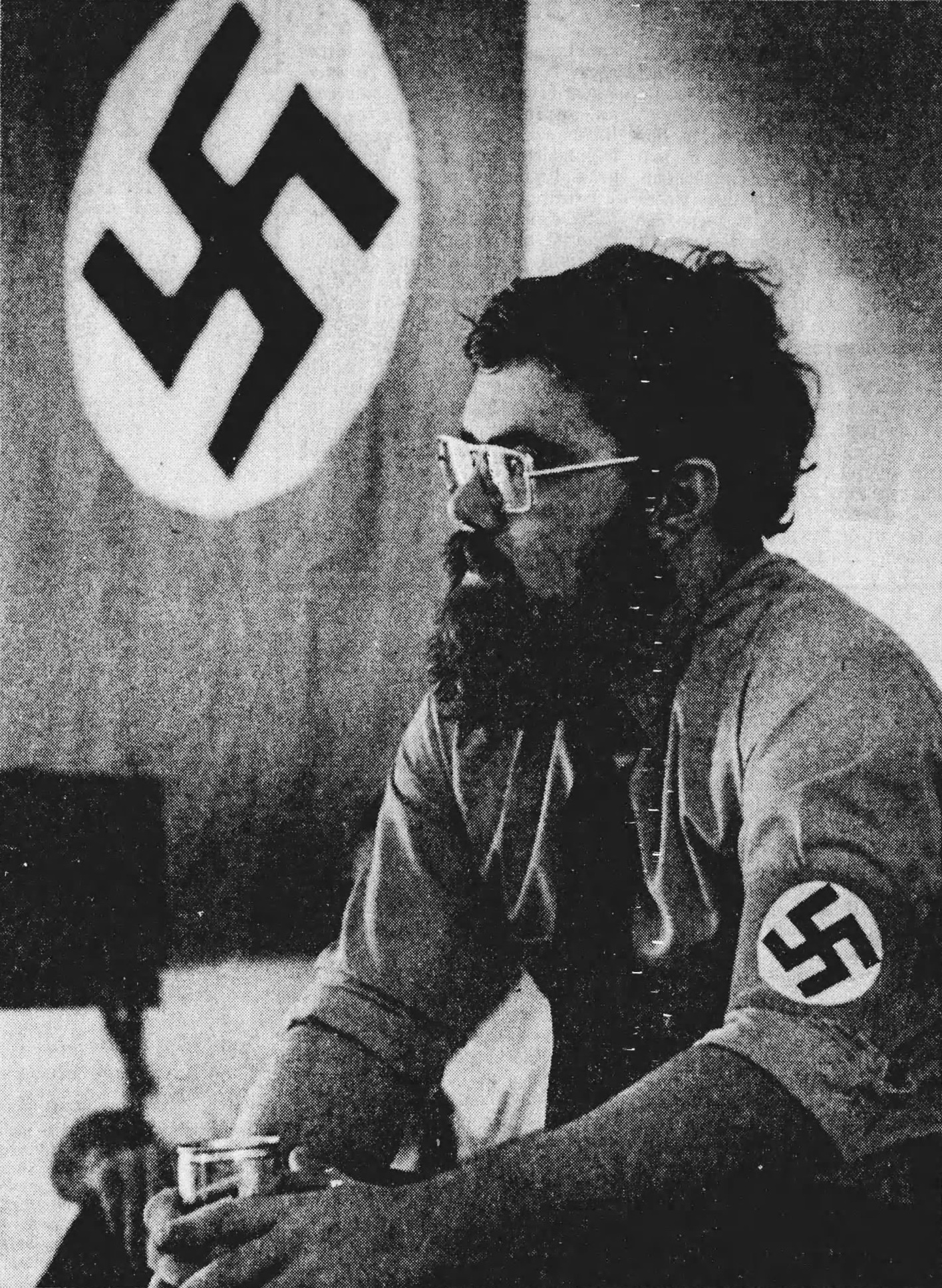
Neo-Nazi Harold Covington in 1977, who assisted the BNP with the formation of Combat 18

In 1992, with assistance from US neo-Nazi Harold Covington, the BNP formed the neo-Nazi Combat 18 (C18) group intended as stewards for events, while operating as a militant wing. The "18" in its name is derived from the initials of the Nazi Party leader Adolf Hitler: A and H are the first and eighth letters of the Latin alphabet. Adopting features of the far-right in the United States, the group promotes violence and antisemitism. In 1998, after the imprisonment of the groups leader for killing a C18 supporter, The Independent described the group as "the UK's most notorious neo-Nazi group".

=== 2000s ===
The National Front continued to decline, whilst Nick Griffin and the BNP grew in popularity and was one of the most successful and fastest-growing far-right parties in the twenty-first century. It promoted ethnic nationalism and believed that "being British is more than merely a passport," as such, it is noted by some, such as Matthew Goodwin, that this is what separates the BNP from other parties in British politics. However, throughout the twentieth and twenty-first century the BNP were able to established itself as an alternative for working-class voters who were angry at the "political establishment" for its ignorance towards their concerns over immigration, which allowed the BNP to have representation at a local council level throughout the mid-2000s.

The 2006 local elections brought the BNP a considerable breakthrough. They gained 33 council seats, the second highest gain of any party at the elections; in Barking and Dagenham, they gained 12 councillor seats. In the 2008 local elections, the party won a seat on the Greater London Assembly for the first time. In the 2009 European Parliament Election, the BNP gained two Members of the European Parliament for Yorkshire and the Humber and North West England. Analysing the EU elections, Ford, Goodwin, & Cutts, concluded that "aggregate research provides evidence of high correlations between support for UKIP and the extreme right BNP", due to the perception of both parties "adopt[ing] similar discourses on issues of immigration and national identity.

In the 2009 Doncaster mayoral election, English Democrats candidate and former UKIP campaigner, Peter Davis, was elected, becoming the party's only electoral success. In October 2009, BNP leader Nick Griffin was invited on the BBC topical debate show Question Time. His appearance caused much controversy and the show was watched by almost 8 million people.

=== 2010s ===
British National Party (BNP) vote share in the 2010 UK general election

The 2010s saw the rise of the English Defence League (EDL), National Action (NA) and Britain First (BF). At the beginning of this decade, it was determined that domestic terrorism, such as ERW terrorism, was not a threat to the UK. Throughout the 2010s, there was a continuing trend of the far-right being more intimidating towards minority groups.

At the 2010 general election, the BNP fielded a record 338 candidates, more than 200 candidates compared to 2005, and won 563,743 votes (1.9% of total) but no seats. The election was the largest push for success at the ballot box by an extreme right party in British history. Considered a blow to the party despite arguably being their best performance by vote count, the party also failed to retain any of the 12 councillors in Barking and Dagenham in the concurrent local election, with only 2 councillors re-elected out of a total of 28. In Barking, 6,620 votes were cast for party leader Griffin, becoming the highest number of votes for a BNP candidate in a general election; although in percentage terms, Griffin's vote share declined by 2.3 percent to 14.6.

Since 2010, a number of former BNP members joined the English Democrats. In 2013, Peter Davies, the incumbent Mayor of Doncaster, quit the party due to the concern over the influx of BNP member joining the party. Party leader Robin Tilbrook stated that approximately 200–300 out of the party's membership of 3,000 were former BNP members. The BNP and English Democrats shared views including opposing the Barnett formula and the creation of an English Parliament, along with rejecting political correctness, multicultural Britishness, and the perceived threat of Islamification in Britain or England. While UKIP felt the politics of ethnic nationalism threatened the British Union, the EDL shared common views with the BNP on immigration and Islam, along with the English Democrats' version of English preservation. In The British Journal of Politics & International Relations, Hayton & Mycock wrote that "it is clear that Englishness is implicitly ethnicised", in reference to the English Democrats stating "public culture of England should be that of the indigenous English", similar to the BNP's conceptions based on the 'white working class'.

In 2010, Nick Griffin announced that he would resign as BNP leader in 2013 after 15 years steering the party. Having stepped down in 2014 he was subsequently expelled later that year, accused of factionalism and destabilising the party. According to Griffin, divisions were based on the decline in electoral support since 2009. The following year, BNP membership was estimated at 500, and at the 2015 general election, the party's vote share declined 99.7% from 2010, having fielded only eight candidates.

Nigel Farage, who had departed from UKIP in early December 2018, launched the Brexit Party in April 2019, that would later change its name to Reform UK. Farage stated that there was "no difference between the Brexit party and UKIP in terms of policy, [but] in terms of personnel, there's a vast difference", criticising UKIP's connections to the far right.

Professor Copsey wrote that the British far-right in the post-2010 era had "lost its organisational anchor" after the collapse of the BNP, with what developed described as "unpredictable and fluid, ranging from Islamophobic street protest on the one hand, fronted by online/street influencers such as ‘Tommy Robinson’, to radicalising right-wing populism on the other, associated with Nigel Farage, and his many party-political incarnations", including UKIP and the Brexit Party.

==== English Defence League ====
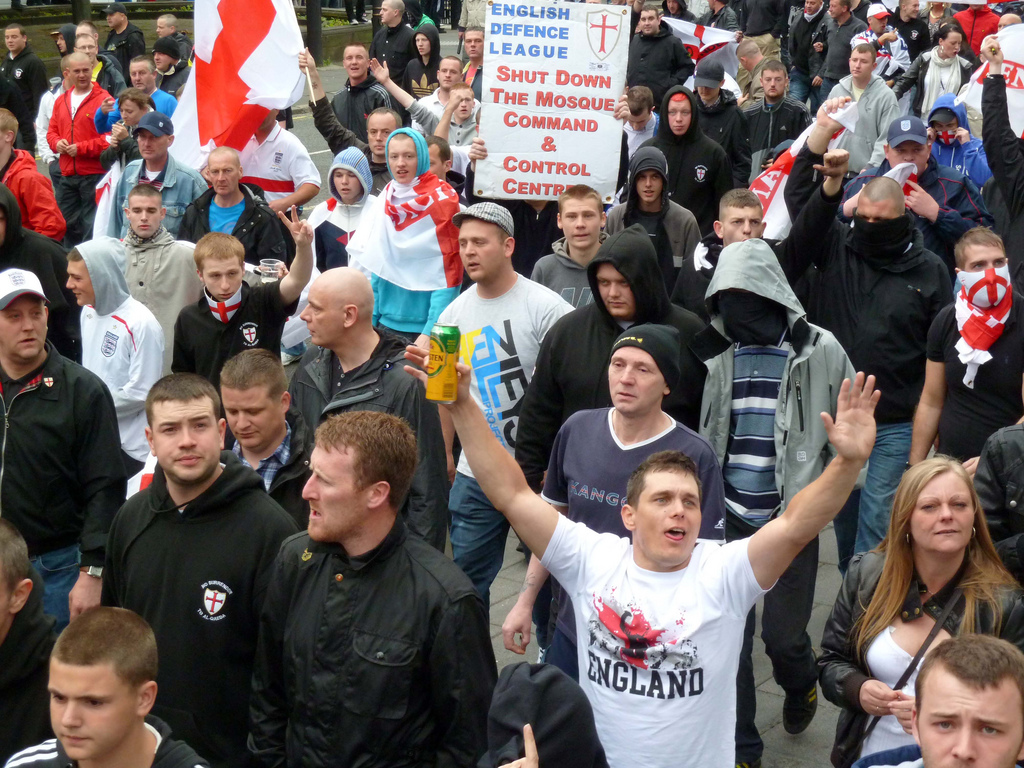
Street protest organised by the EDL in Newcastle, England, in 2010

The racist and Islamophobic group, the English Defence League, oversaw early "rapid and unprecedented" growth, appealing to nationalist sentiments on a cultural rather than explicitly racial basis. Originally formed in Luton in 2009, by former BNP member Tommy Robinson, it protested against what it considered the Islamification of Britain. Its ideology was driven by opposition to Islam, which it deemed a "threat" to "our way of life, our customs, and our rule of law." This opposition led the EDL to organise demonstrations in towns and cities across England, the largest of which occurred in Luton in February 2011.

In November 2011, the EDL came to an agreement with the British Freedom Party, in order to contest local elections. Robinson shared a vice-chair role in the party, with Paul Weston, a former UK Independence Party candidate, as chairman. The party was founded as a BNP breakaway founded by Eddy Butler, who had previously made an unsuccessful attempt to oust the BNP leader Griffin.

==== Britain First ====
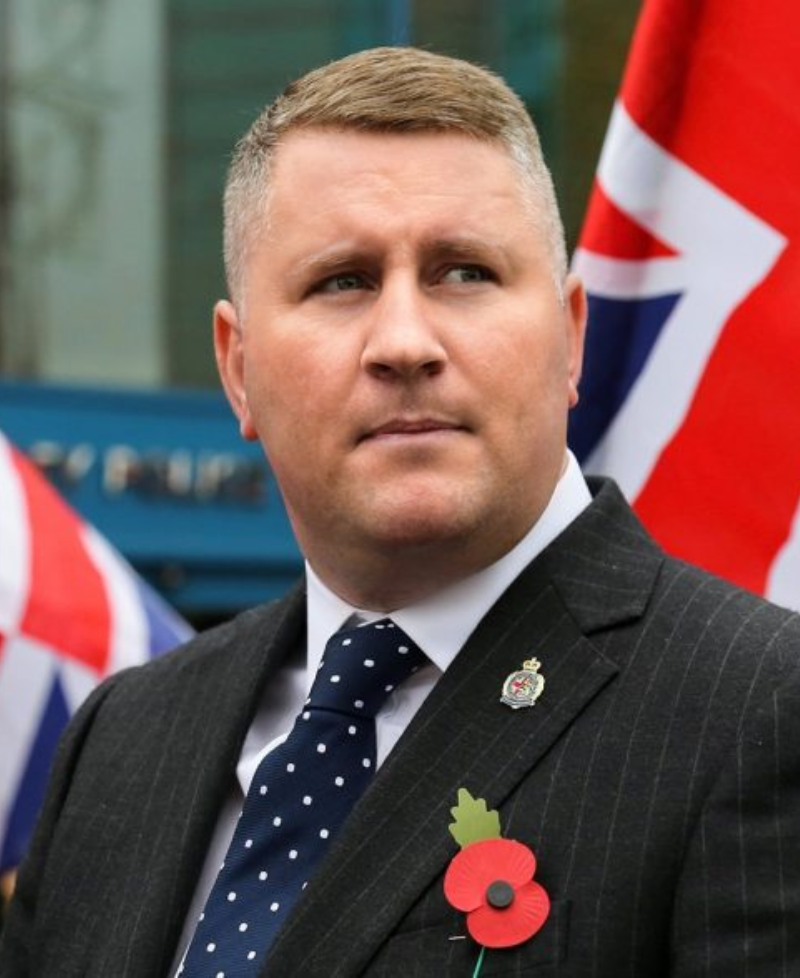
Leader of Britain First, Paul Golding, in 2017

In 2011, the far-right, anti-Islam, and fascist party Britain First shared views similar to that of the EDL. The movement was formed by former members of the BNP, campaigns primarily against immigration, multiculturalism and what it sees as the Islamisation of the United Kingdom, and aims to protect with the intention of "protecting British and Christian morality." The group is inspired by Ulster loyalism and has a vigilante wing called the "Britain First Defence Force". Throughout its time, BF was largely digital. In response to videos of young Muslims intimidating women, gay men and those drinking alcohol, BF became more confrontational in its resistance against Muslims and Islam. It attracted attention by taking direct action such as protests outside homes of alleged Islamists, self-described "Christian patrols", "invasions" of British mosques, and online activism. Its leader Paul Golding stood as a candidate in the 2016 London mayoral election, receiving 1.2% of the vote. Golding was jailed for eight weeks in December 2016 for breaching a court order, and in 2018, he was convicted for harassment and imprisoned again.

==== British Democratic Party ====
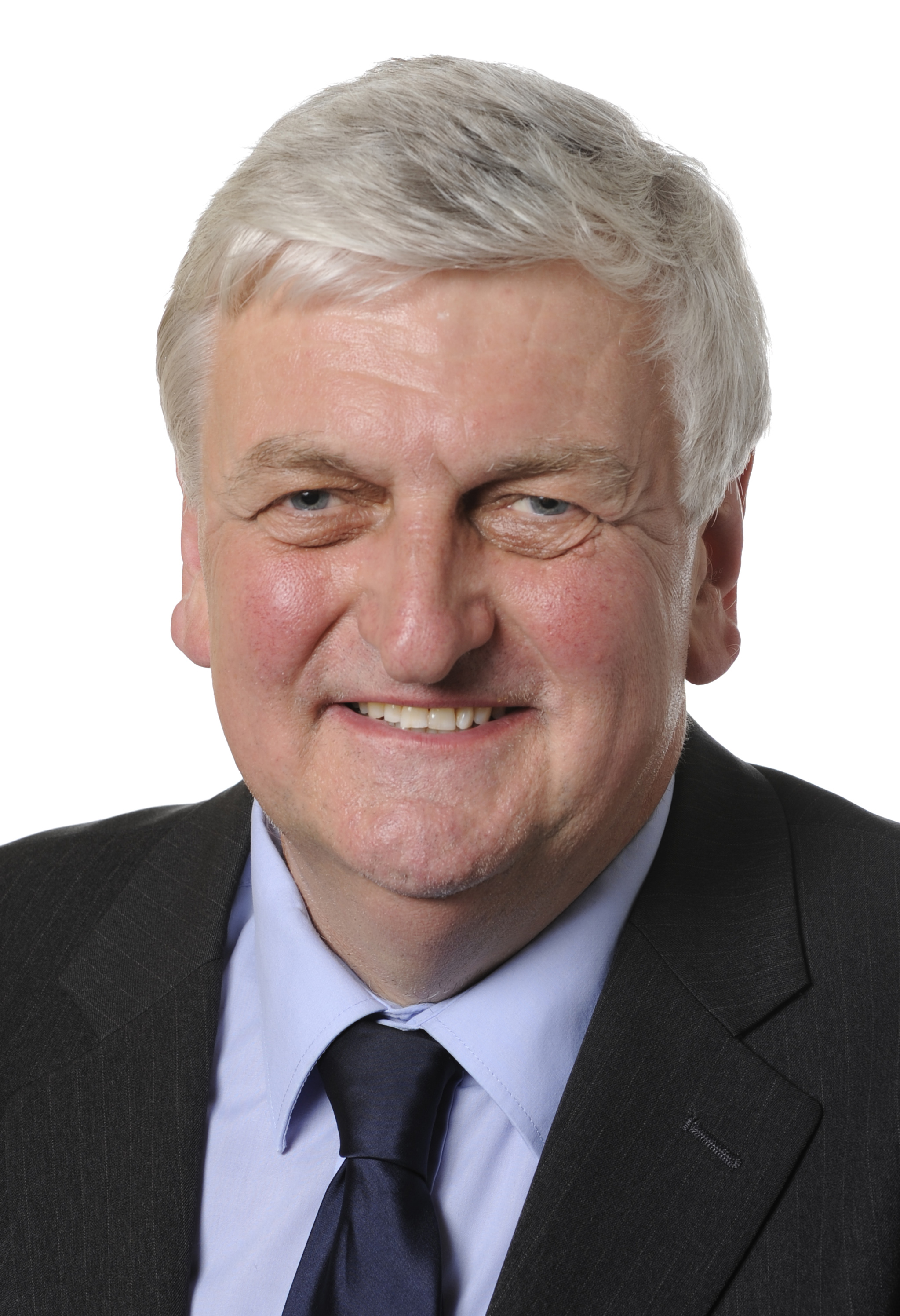
President of the British Democratic Party, Andrew Brons, in 2009

In February 2013, the British Democratic Party (BDP) was launched by former Member of the European Parliament (MEP) and National Front chairman Andrew Brons, who had resigned from the BNP in October 2012 after narrowly failing in his campaign to unseat Nick Griffin as BNP leader in 2011. Brons remains the BDP's inaugural president, and the chairman is James Lewthwaite. The BDP has attracted former members of the British National Party (BNP), Democratic Nationalists, Freedom Party, UK Independence Party (UKIP), For Britain Movement, and Civil Liberty, including long-standing far-right political leader John Bean. In 2013, Nick Lowles of Hope not Hate believed the party would be a serious threat to the BNP, commenting "The BDP brings together all of the hardcore Holocaust deniers and racists that have walked away from the BNP over the last two to three years, plus those previously, who could not stomach the party's image changes".

==== National Action ====
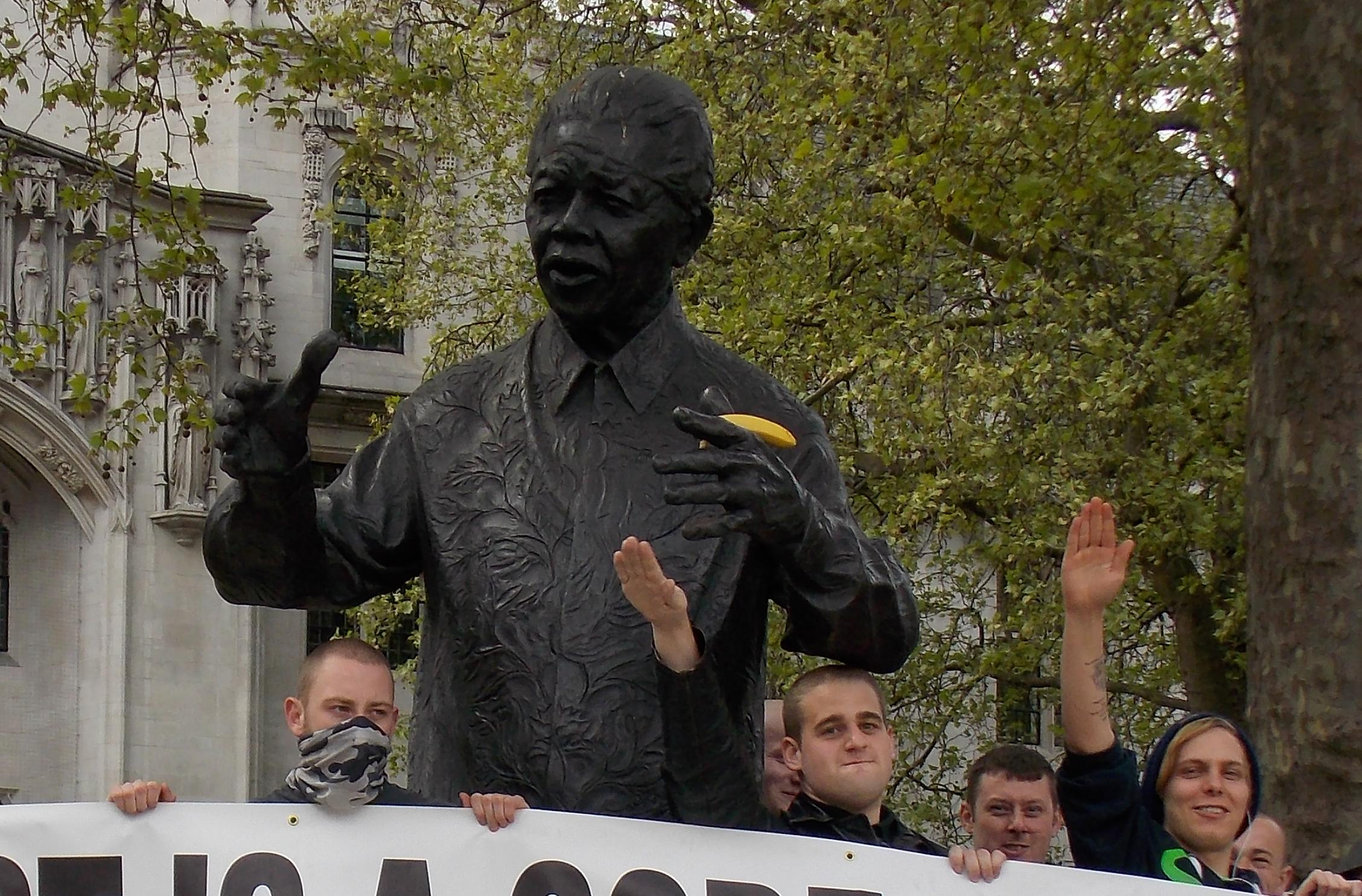
A National Action protest in 2014 at the statue of Nelson Mandela in Parliament Square, with Nazi salutes

Founded in 2013 by Christopher Lythgoe, National Action is a terrorist organisation and the first extreme right-wing group banned by the UK government since the Second World War. National Action is described as a Neo-Nazi organisation that stirs up "hatred, glorifies violence and promotes vile ideology." It focused mainly on attracting young people through targeted propaganda. In 2016, 22 members were arrested and charged for being members, with by the end of the year the group being proscribed under the Terrorism Act 2000. In the years that followed, many figures were linked to the group and arrested on suspicion of plots to commit extremist acts, such as plotting to kill Rosie Cooper, in a bid to "replicate" the murder of Jo Cox, and the possession of terrorist manifestos.

With origins rooted in the BNP, National Action was originally part of the intellectual tradition within the far-right, before moving towards direct action and becoming increasingly confrontational with other far-right groups, such as the EDL. In contrast to the tradition within the British far-right since the 2000s, the organisation publicly identified as part of the national socialist movement and embraced a more traditional Nazi ideology, while distancing itself from populism such as that of UKIP and its supporters. In 2017, Hope not Hate suggested that the group had become the most dominant influence within the British far-right. Its ideology includes ultranationalism, racism, and antisemitism.

==== UK Independence Party ====
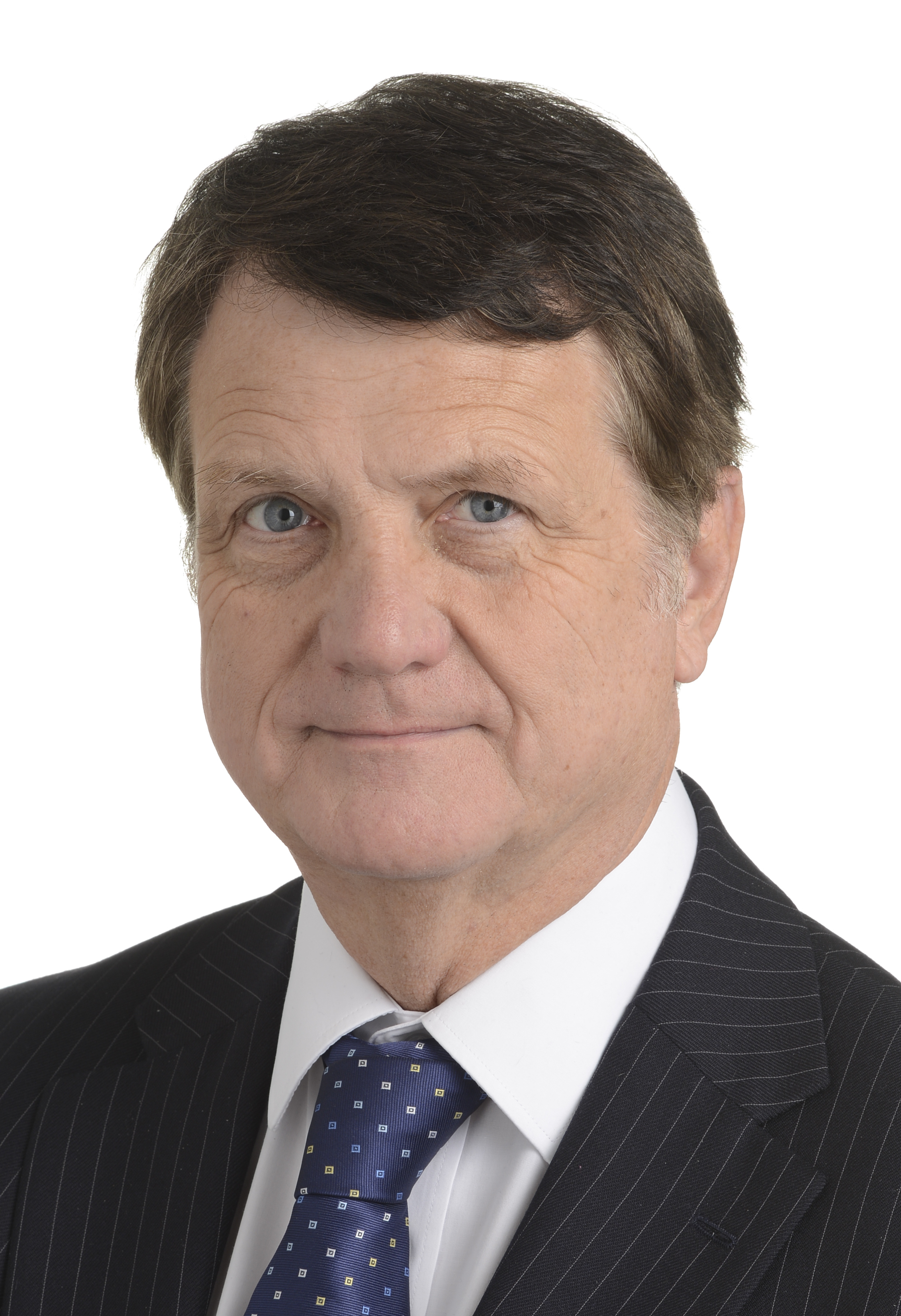
Former UKIP leader, Gerard Batten, in 2018, described as moving the party towards the far-right

In 2015, the UK Independence Party (UKIP) was not universally considered far-right. With the recent collapse of the BNP and EDL, professor Steven Fielding attributed the rise of the UKIP to having gained BNP voters and "extreme Eurosceptics". Political scientist, Tim Bale, commented "you could say that UKIP is populist radical right".

The British National Party (BNP) blamed UKIP for its decline, accusing the latter of stealing BNP policies and slogans. UKIP leader Nigel Farage claimed that his party absorbed much of the BNP's former voters during their electoral peak in the early 2010s. UKIP's vote and support peaked at the 2015 United Kingdom general election with nearly 4 million votes representing 12.6% of the vote, up from 3.1% in the 2010 election, consequently surpassing the Liberal Democrats as the third most voted for party. UKIP support steadily declined thereafter, polling only 1.8% percent in the 2017 and losing their final seat, followed by 0.1% in 2019.

From 2018 to 2019, under the leadership of Gerard Batten, UKIP was widely described as moving into far-right territory, at which point many longstanding members – including former leaders Nigel Farage and Paul Nuttall – left. As the new permanent leader, Batten focused the party more on opposing Islam and sought closer relations with the far-right activist Stephen Yaxley-Lennon, otherwise known as Tommy Robinson, and his followers. Batten would leave the leadership of UKIP in 2019.

==== For Britain Movement ====
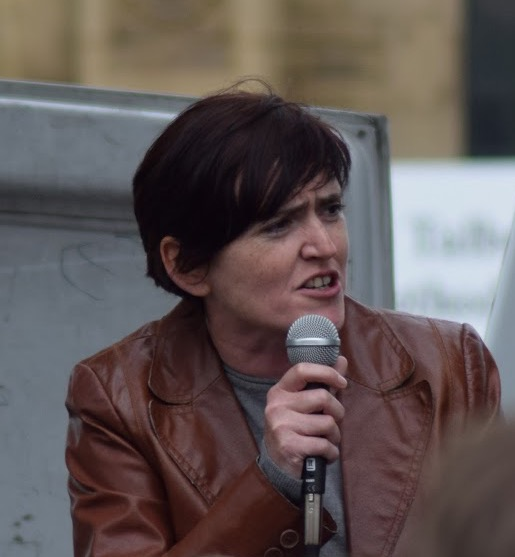
Leader of For Britain (2017–2022), Anne Marie Waters, in 2016

In October 2017, former UKIP leadership candidate and anti-Islam activist Anne Marie Waters launched the For Britain Movement. Unlike most far-right parties that came before them, For Britain were zionist, opposed to antisemitism, and held more moderate views on social issues like LGBT rights. Former English Defence League leader Tommy Robinson and singer-songwriter Morrissey announced their support for the party, and fellow far-right and counter-jihad political party Liberty GB merged with For Britain. The party received support from several former members of the BNP, Generation Identity, and National Action. For Britain had some limited success in local council elections, but failed to make any significant breakthroughs in the parliamentary by-elections they contested.

==== Patriotic Alternative ====
In September 2019, the former director of publicity of the BNP, neo-Nazi and antisemitic conspiracy theorist Mark Collett established the far-right group Patriotic Alternative (PA). The group promotes a white nationalist ideology; its stance has been variously described as Islamophobic, fascist and racist. According to Hope not Hate, members of PA have supported political violence, the white genocide conspiracy theory, and Holocaust denial. The group opposes Black Lives Matter, has displayed White Lives Matter banners around the UK, and campaigned against what they call "white genocide".

=== 2020s–present ===
In July 2022, Waters announced that For Britain was ceasing all operations with immediate effect, with their elected councillor subsequently joining the British Democrats. The BDP experienced a sharp increase in membership that year, with several former members of Britain First and the BNP. In the local elections the following year, UKIP lost its remaining district and county councillors, with professor Tim Bale declaring the party as having been wiped out. The BDP also performed poorly losing its sole councillor amid standing five candidates, with PA supporting the BDP in the elections, according to Searchlight.

In November 2023, The Times described PA as "Britain's largest far-right white supremacist movement". According to Hope not Hate, splits, especially the 2023 creation of the Homeland Party, which has eclipsed it, then pushed PA into decline. The following year, a prominent member of PA was reported to have taken part in the Southport riot, while another member helped to promote the event, amid the EDL being considered defunct as an organisation. As of April 2025, PA has around 500 members, and in May, Collett urged PA supporters to infiltrate the Reform UK party, seeking to move the party further to the right. Supporters of the group also organised and participated in anti-immigration protests. The following month, after disagreement with Nigel Farage, former Deputy Leader of Reform UK, Ben Habib, launched Advance UK. Having received endorsement from Tommy Robinson, the party sponsored the Unite the Kingdom rally in September. It announced de-registering as a political party the following June, with Habib endorsing Restore Britain due to being "very, very similar".

After the 2024 riots, what developed was based on the same "underlying grievances" according to professor Copsey, this includes the Operation Raise the Colours campaign the following year. As of 2025, the UK far-right currently thrives on social media platforms, having adapted after the riots towards flag raising that lacks an openly extremist appearance.

In 2026, Copsey described the shift as transitioning in recent years "from violent, extra-parliamentary protest to decentralised, non-violent cultural-symbolic activism that weaponised national identity through flags, heritage and territorial marking." Jonathan Portes, writing for UK in a Changing Europe, argued that claims the UK was close to civil war and could encourage narratives in which democratic processes are seen as fundamentally compromised.

==== Reform UK ====
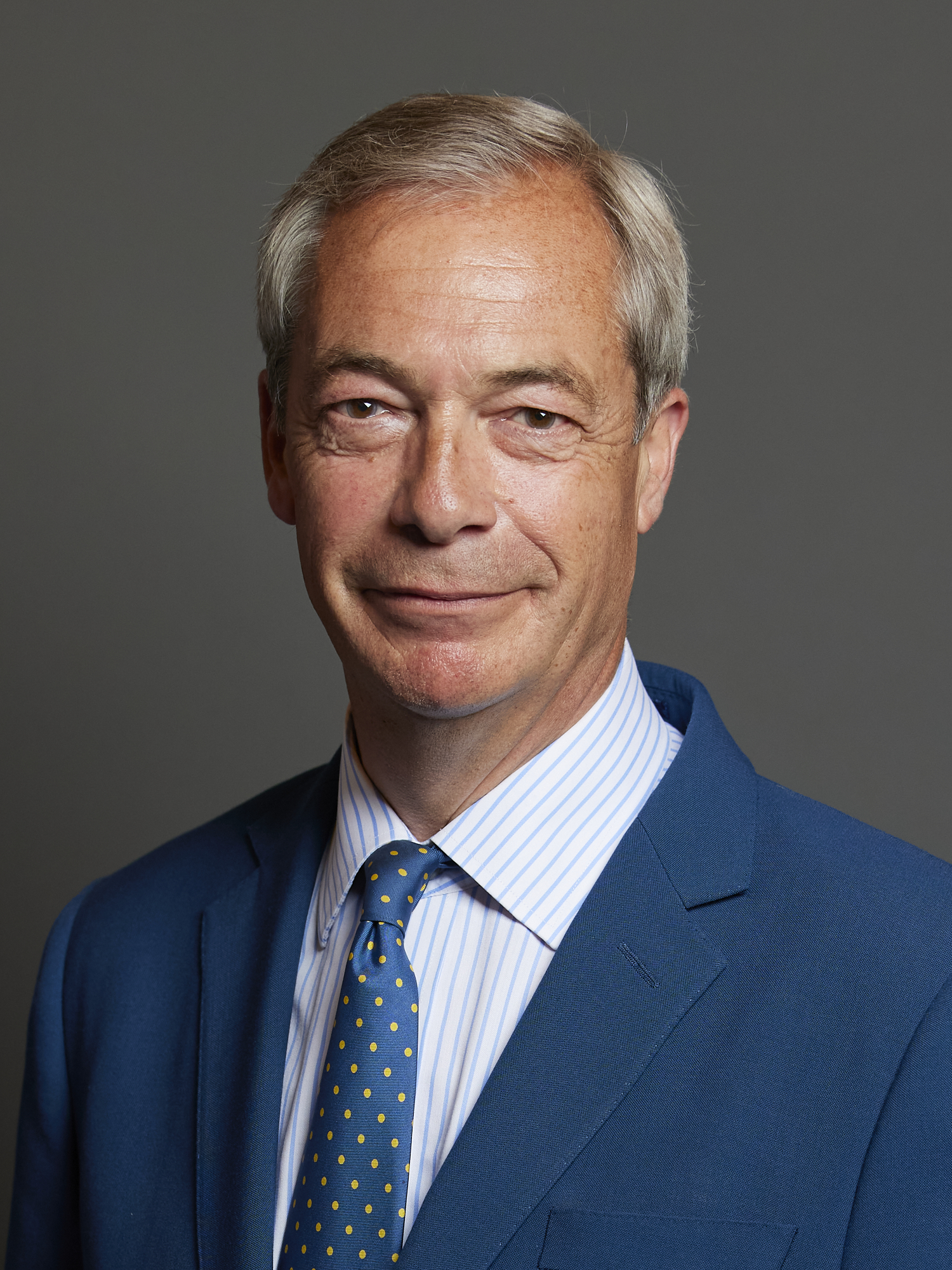
Reform UK leader Nigel Farage, described by professor Tim Bale as the "British representative of the populist radical right in Europe"

The Brexit Party officially changed its name to Reform UK in January 2021. Farage subsequently stepped down as leader and was replaced by the party chairman, Richard Tice, before Farage replaced Tice as leader again in June 2024.

Since 2020, Reform UK has been described by political scientists as radical right, as a subset of far-right politics, and the party has been categorised as far-right in various peer-reviewed academic journals. Reform UK rejects the descriptor of far-right, and has threatened legal action against media using it. After winning 14% of the vote and winning five seats in the 2024 UK general election, political scientist Tim Bale described Reform UK party leader Farage as the "British representative of the populist radical right in Europe". According to Bale in 2025: "most political scientists" would say that Reform is a far-right party, "if you accept that as the umbrella term and then say they're populist radical right". In the Journal of Contemporary European Studies, Shuttleworth, Brown & Mondon stated that the categorisation of Reform UK as far-right had been regularly left out from academic and public discourse, despite its "clear credentials".

==== Homeland Party ====
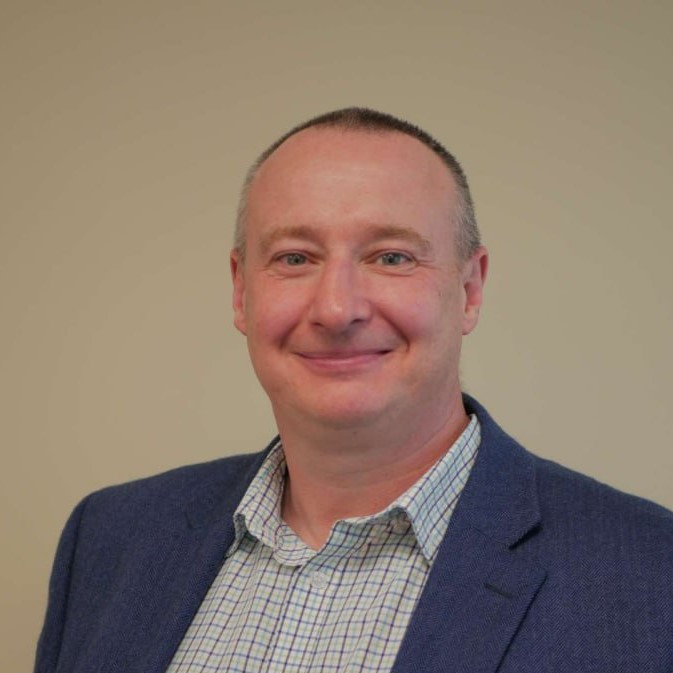
Founder of the Homeland Party, white nationalist Kenny Smith, in 2023

The Homeland Party split from Patriotic Alternative (PA) in April 2023, founded by the white nationalist Kenny Smith, The party was formed predominately by Scottish members who had left PA. It is ideologically similar to PA and ideological differences were not a reason for the split. Homeland espouses the white genocide conspiracy theory and has been described as the largest fascist group in the UK by Hope not Hate.

Internationally, Homeland is associated with the far-right European parties Alternative for Germany (AfD) and the Polish Confederation Liberty and Independence. The party also merged with a local branch of the European Identitarian movement. In April 2025 The Telegraph described the party as "nationalist and anti-immigration", highlighting one of its policies of "the re-migration, or encouraged mass emigration, of unintegrated and illegal migrants."

==== 2024 riots ====
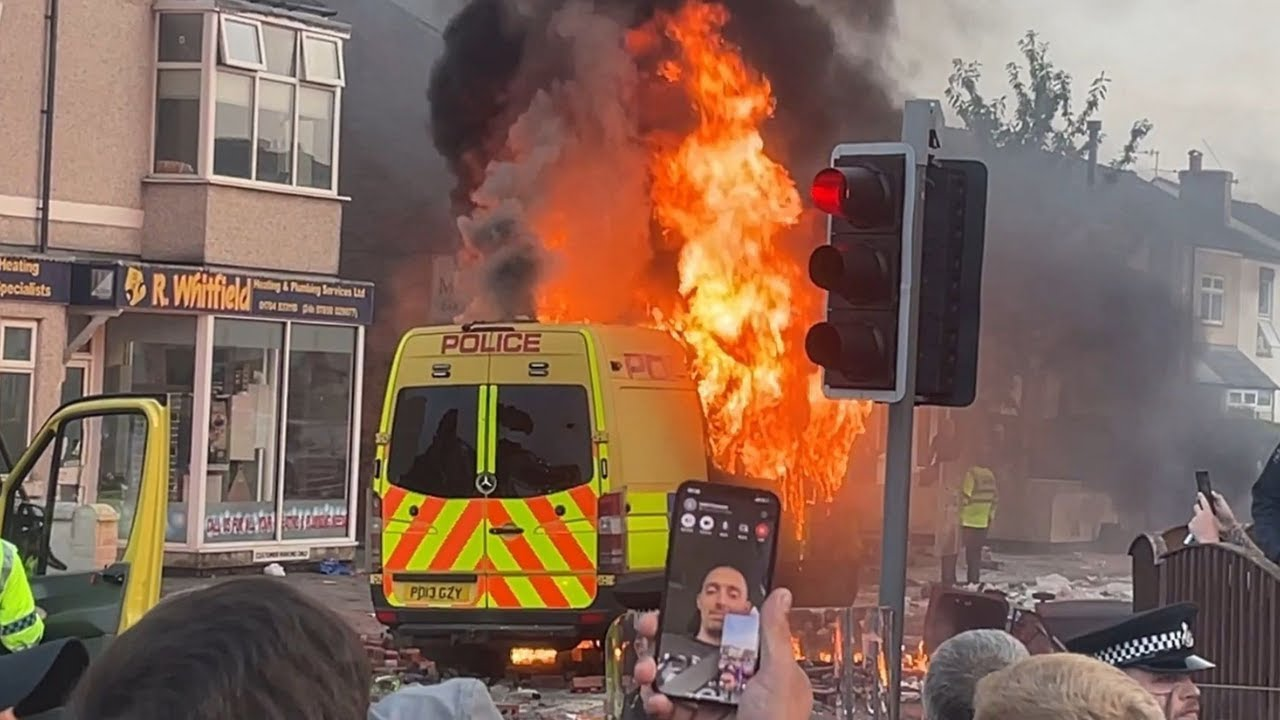
A police van on fire during the 30 July 2024 riots in Southport

In July and August 2024, far-right riots occurred in England and Northern Ireland, after a mass stabbing in Southport on 29 July. The first riot started in Southport and later many protests and riots spread across the country. The riots involved racist attacks, arson and looting, and were the worst disorder in the United Kingdom since the 2011 England riots. The riots were fuelled by underlying Islamophobia, racist, anti-immigrant and anti-mass immigration sentiments, and disinformation about the identity of the Southport stabber. Far-right groups spread misinformation online.

The riots had limited formal organisation; instead, rioters assembled around individual far-right social media personalities with the aid of far-right Telegram group chats affiliated with Active Club England, the terrorgram network, and football hooliganism firms. Groups involved in the riots included supporters of the EDL, including its former leader Tommy Robinson, members of Patriotic Alternative, and Britain First. The riots were also supported by the British Movement and National Front. Rioters clashed with local Muslims and counter-protesters, who were mobilised by Stand Up to Racism and other anti-fascist and anti-racist groups.

==== 2025 anti-immigration protests and disorders ====
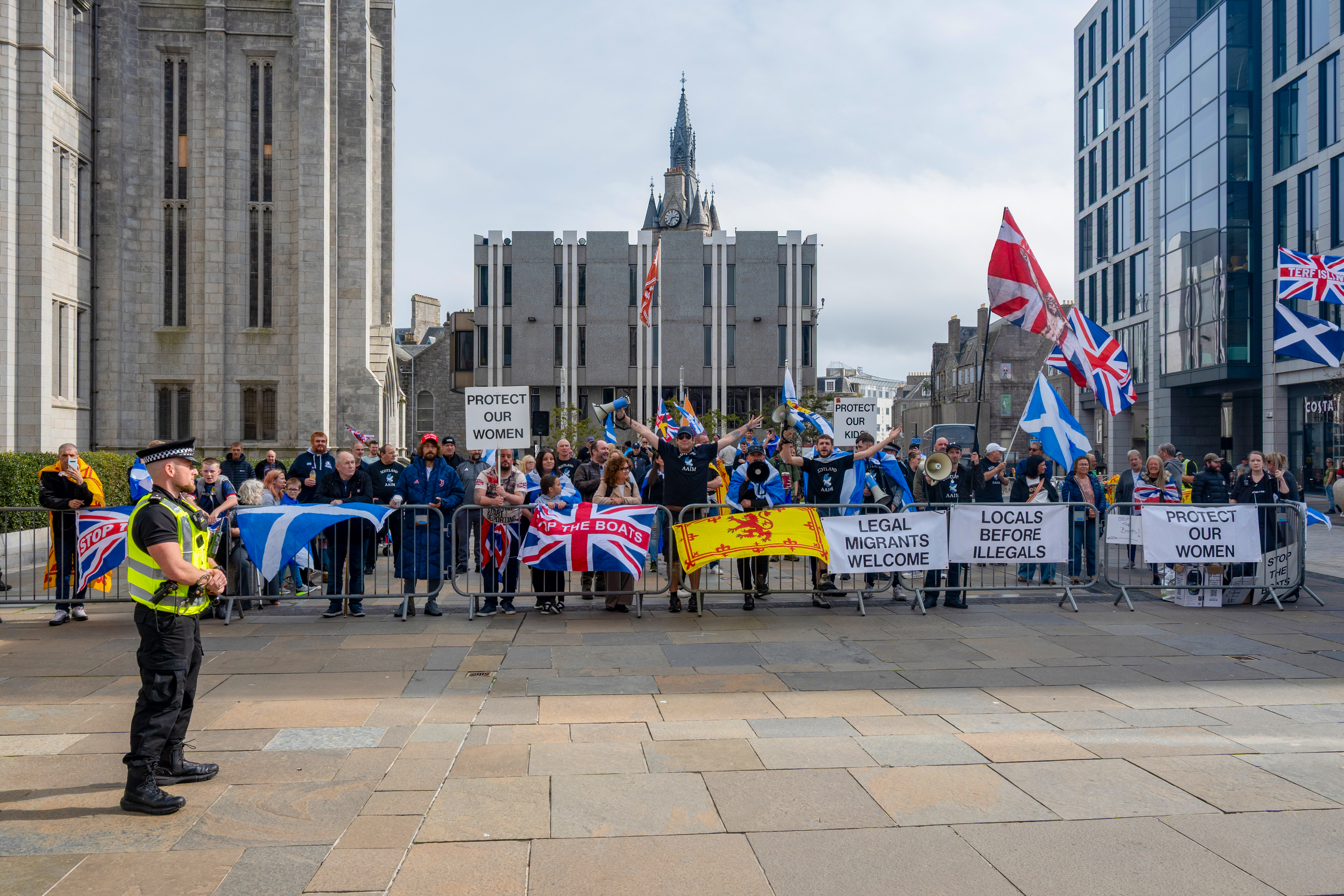
Anti-immigration protest in Aberdeen, September 2025

Since early 2025, protests against immigration have taken place in parts of the United Kingdom. The protests have led to officers being attacked and multiple arrests. Some have been focused around hotels being used by the government of the United Kingdom to provide accommodation for asylum seekers, while others are against immigration more broadly. Many were organised or attended by far-right groups including Britain First, UKIP, Homeland Party, and Patriotic Alternative, who have also been accused of spreading misinformation online.

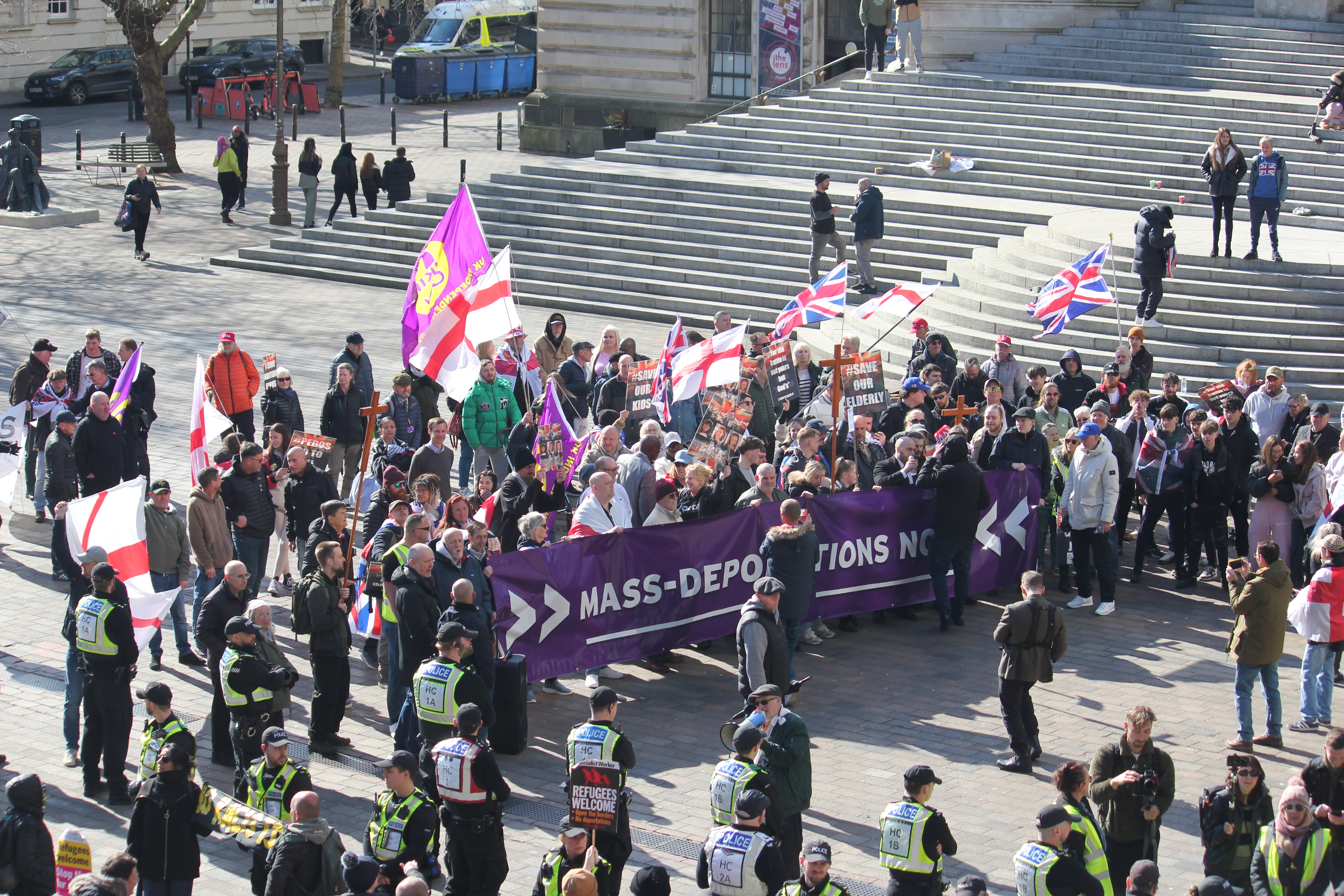
UKIP rally in Portsmouth behind the banner "Mass Deportations Now"

The wave of far-right anti-immigration protests began in the aftermath of a series starting in Epping in July, later spreading to other cities, including Bristol, Glasgow, Liverpool, Manchester and Newcastle; the largest protest came on 13 September when up to 150,000 people took part in a London march organised by far-right activist Tommy Robinson, where 26 police officers were injured. UKIP organised some of the protests under their "Mass Deportations Tour", which saw sometimes large counter-protests organised by groups such as Stand Up To Racism. The anti-immigration protests saw an increase in efforts to use fears of violence against women to lend respectability and palatability to far-right views.

==== Restore Britain ====
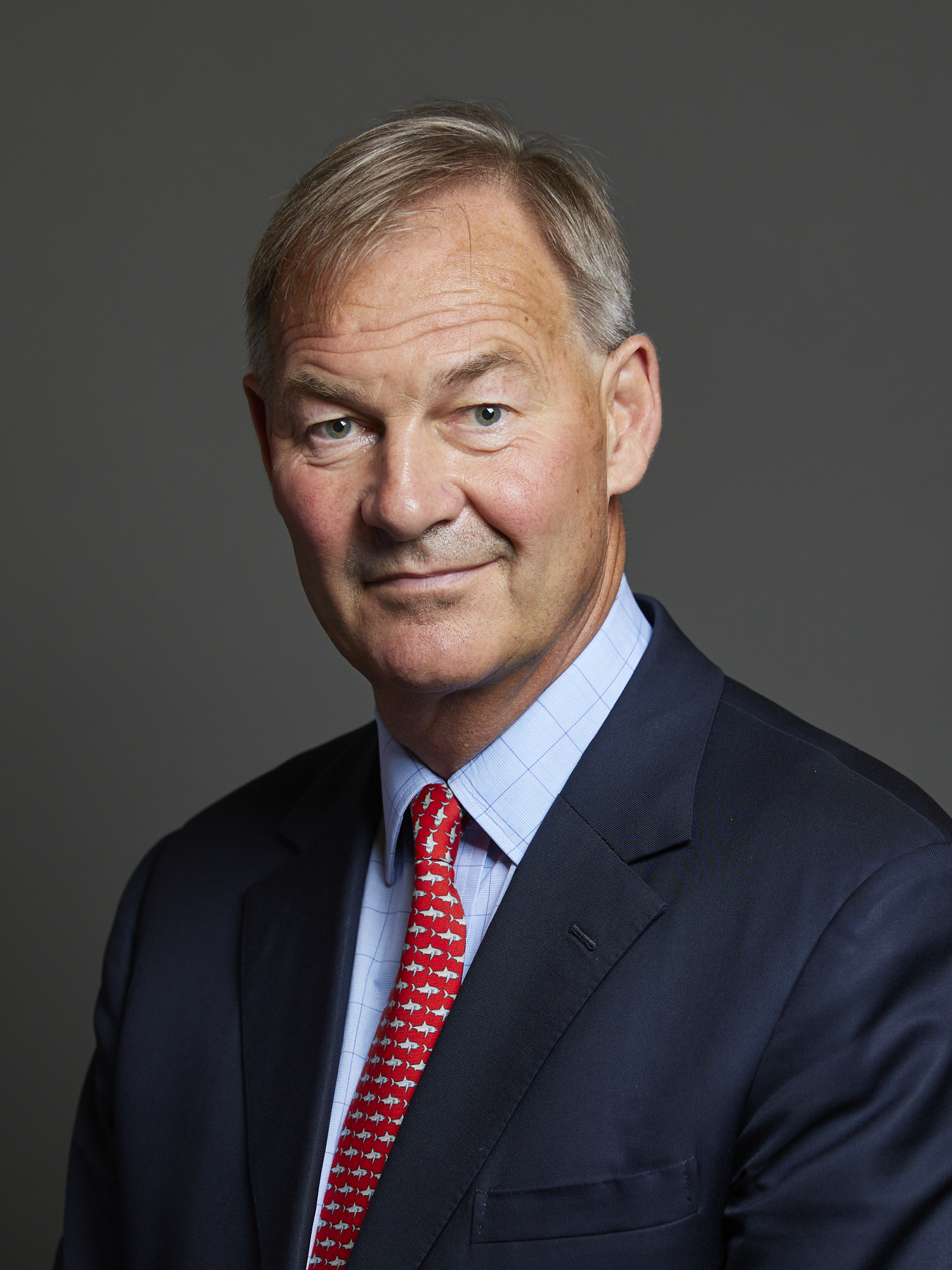
Leader of the ethno-nationalist party Restore Britain, Rupert Lowe, in 2024

In June 2025, Rupert Lowe launched Restore Britain. Restore is openly ethno-nationalist and considered to be part of the radical right. Lowe has stated indifference to Restore Britain being described as far-right or racist. Hope not Hate categorised Restore as "part of a broader re-racialisation of the British far right" with openly racial politics, while assembling a coalition of figures located "to the right of Reform, all the way through to open fascists". According to the advocacy group, by February 2026, ethnonationalists had joined the party, with support from British neo-Nazis including the leadership of Patriotic Alternative.

In April 2026, The Times reported that "prominent neo-fascist leaders" had backed the party. Former official of the British National Party, Simon Birkett, described Restore Britain as the last hope for the far-right to achieve political power, stating that there was a "a world of difference" between the party and Reform UK. According to Steve Laws, the party can be trusted due to being "well to the right" of other far-right parties including Britain First, the British Democratic Party, and the Homeland Party. Another supporter of Restore, Miles Routledge, described Laws' views on mass deportations as "liberal". Former officials of the British Democratic Party and For Britain have also declared their support for the party. A month prior, Britain First had agreed to defer to Restore Britain in order to avoid fielding candidates in the same areas.

==== 2025 flag raising ====
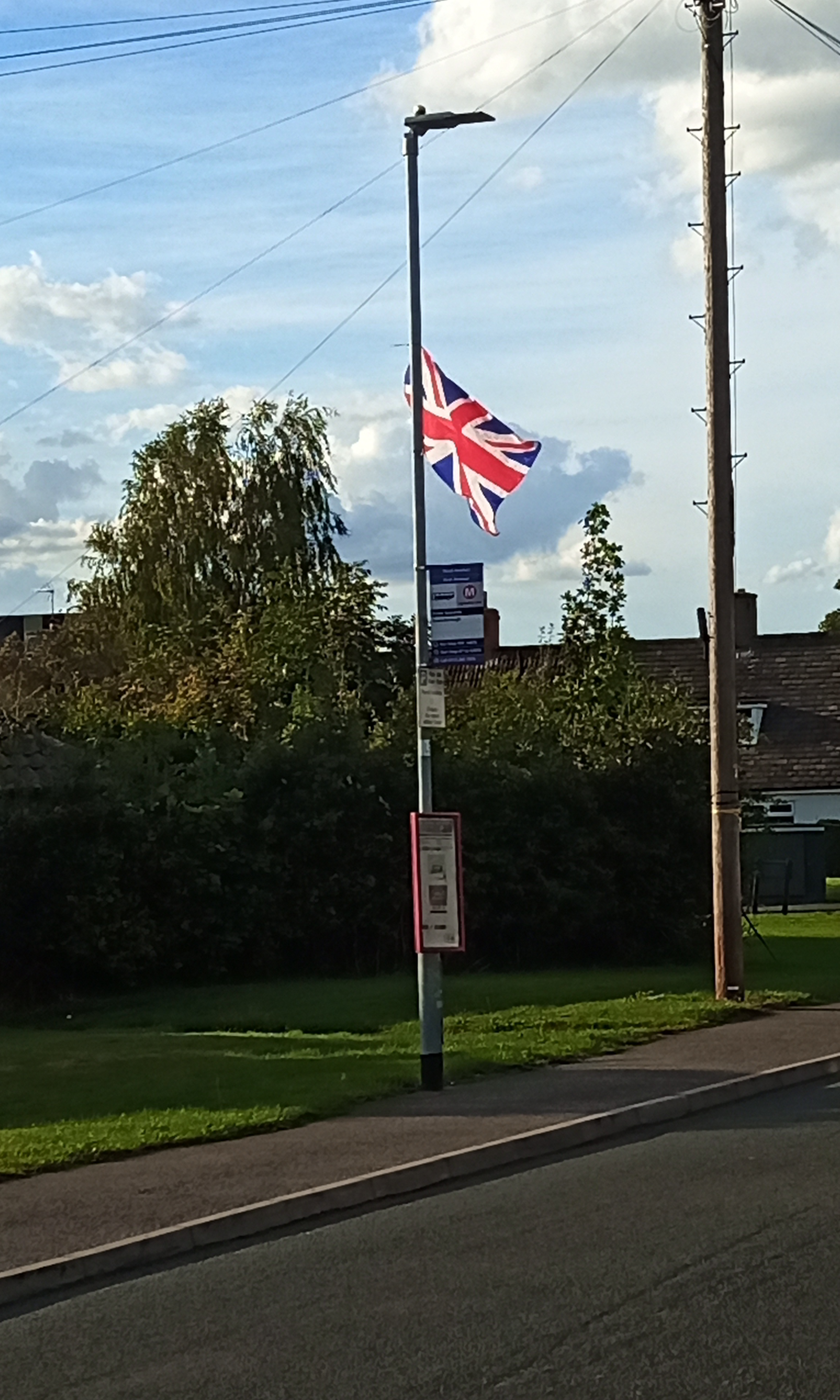
A Union Flag flying from a lamppost, September 2025

"Operation Raise the Colours" is a 2025 political campaign in the United Kingdom that consists of displaying the Union Flag and the Saint George's Cross in public places, as well as the flags of the other constituent countries of the UK. The campaign began in August 2025, shortly after the beginning of the 2025 British anti-immigration protests, and has particularly aroused controversy around the Flag of England due to its history of use by anti-immigration nationalists. It has involved tying flags to lamp-posts and painting them onto mini-roundabouts. Supporters of the campaign say that this is with the aim of promoting patriotism and it is non-partisan, although it has been supported by several figures and organisations associated with the far-right, including the fascist political party Britain First, the anti-Islam campaigner Tommy Robinson, and the organisation named Raise the Colours.

Anti-racist organisation Stand Up to Racism expressed its opposition to the campaign and organised counter-protests against Raise the Colours campaigners putting up flags. The group, citing the campaign's support by Robinson and Britain First, said that it is an intentional attempt by the far-right to spread their ideas, inflame tensions and intimidate asylum seekers, immigrants, Muslims and other minority groups amid rising anti-immigration sentiment in the United Kingdom. Anti-racist group Hope not Hate have said that some of the campaign's organising had been implemented by far-right activists.

==== Patriot Platform ====
Danny Tommo in 2025, founder of Patriot Platform

In summer 2026, having left the Raise the Colours group after falling out with its co-founder, Danny Tommo founded the group Patriot Platform. The group, wearing all black clothing and balaclavas, came to public prominence in September 2026 with anti-immigration protests in Dover, Portsmouth, and Gosport. Several hundred supporters turned up in Gosport, a number of participants were arrested, and in Portsmouth, police officers were injured. The i Paper compared the Dover protest to the 'Blackshirts', as well as Oswald Mosely's British Union of Fascists. The Guardian described the group as "the moulding together of a series of local far-right groups under a single leader". In reporting "an evolution in British far-right activism", The Conversation described a shift "towards something more mobile, networked and potentially vigilante in nature".

== Right-wing terrorism ==
Between 2007 and 2022, seventy people associated with the far-right have been convicted of more than two hundred terrorist offences. In 2013, the UK government assessed that right-wing extremism was "very low risk"; this changed the following year after the emergence of the neo-Nazi group National Action. Since 2014, there has been a significant increase in the threat from extreme right-wing terrorism (Note: Extreme right-wing terrorism (ERWT) is a term coined by the Intelligence and Security Committee of Parliament (ISC) referring to "the segment of the far-right movement involved in politically motivated violence".) (ERWT) in the UK. ERWT includes cultural nationalism, white nationalism and white supremacist ideologies. In response, experts in security and intelligence have increased monitoring of threats from groups and individuals holding extreme right-wing views. Counter Terrorism Policing reported that between March 2017 and December 2021, 12 of 32 imminent terrorism plots that were thwarted were ERWT.

In 2020, Europol reported that the UK had the highest number of far-right terrorist attacks and plots in Europe during the previous year. The Independent Reviewer of Terrorism Legislation reported in 2022 that one in five counter-terrorism investigations and 40% of terrorism-related arrests were related to far-right perspectives. That same year, the Intelligence and Security Committee of Parliament published a report on ERWT which said that key views of various far-right groups include white supremacy, cultural nationalism, opposition to immigration and the Identitarian movement. In 2026, Director General of MI5, Ken McCallum, described right-wing violence over the past year as the most notable trend with immigration centres and asylum hotels becoming increasingly likely targets for anti-migrant extremists, contributing to a rise in the UK Threat Levels.

In the UK, ERWT can be traced back to Sir Oswald Mosley’s British Union of Fascists, an ultranationalist group that was subsequently banned in 1940. In Studies in Conflict & Terrorism, Jupp wrote that "Politically motivated violence and terrorism have been persistent features of this movement, which comprises a complex assortment of political parties, street movements, extremist organizations and atomized lone actors advocating a diverse range of ideologies and narratives." This includes individuals associated with the NF and BNP, with David Copeland's London bombings serving as a notable example.

== Election results ==
Year	Candidates	Votes	%	Rank
1959	National Labour Party (UK, 1957)	1,685	0.0	14th
Total		1,685▲	0.0	Lost
1964	British National Party (1960)	3,410	0.0	11th
1964	National Democratic Party (UK, 1966)	349	0.0	
1964	Patriotic Party (UK)	1,108	0.0	15th
Total		4,867▲	0.0	Lost
1966	British National Party (1960)	5,182	0.0	11th
1966	National Democratic Party (UK, 1966)	769	0.0	
1966	Patriotic Party (UK)	126	0.0	
Total		6,077▲	0.0	Lost
1970	National Front (UK)	11,449	0.0	13th
1970	National Democratic Party (UK, 1966)	14,276	0.0	12th
Total		25,725▲	0.0	Lost
1974	National Front (UK)	76,865	0.2	9th
1974	National Democratic Party (UK, 1966)	1,161	0.0	24
Total		78,026▲	0.2	Lost
1974	National Front (UK)	113,843	0.4	8th
Total		113,843▲	0.4	Lost
1979	National Front (UK)	191,719	0.6	6th
Total		191,719▲	0.6	Lost
1983	National Front (UK)	27,065	0.1	12th
1983	British National Party	14,621	0.0	9th
Total		41,686▼	0.1	Lost
1987	British National Party	553	0.0	22
Total		553▼	0.0	Lost
1992	British National Party	7,631	0.1	16th
1992	National Front (UK)	4,816	0.1	19th
Total		12,447▲	0.2	Lost
1997	British National Party	35,832	0.1	16th
1997	National Front (UK)	2,716	0.0	28th
Total		38,548▲	0.1	Lost
2001	British National Party	47,129	0.2	15th
2001	National Front (UK)	2,484	0.0	29th
Total		49,613▲	0.2	Lost
2005	British National Party	192,745	0.7	8th
2005	National Front (UK)	8,079	0.0	23rd
Total		200,824▲	0.7	Lost
2010	British National Party	564,331	1.9	5th
2010	National Front (UK)	10,784	0.0	21st
Total		575,115▲	1.9	Lost
2015	British National Party	1,667	0.0	32nd
2015	National Front (UK)	1,114	0.0	37th
2015	British Democratic Party (2013)	210	0.0	58th
Total		2,991▼	0.0	Lost
2017	British National Party	4,580	0.0	17th
Total		4,580▲	0.0	Lost
2019	British National Party	510	0.0	47th
Total		510▼	0.0	Lost
2024	British Democratic Party (2013)	1,860	0.0	46th
Total		1,860▲	0.0	Lost

== See also ==
- List of British far-right groups (1945–present)
- Far-left politics in the United Kingdom
- Paki-bashing
