= Battle of Lewisham =

1977 battle in southeast London, England

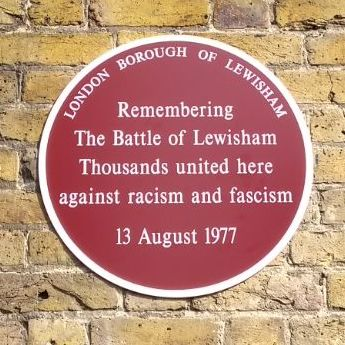
- Commemorative plaque in New Cross
- Date: 13 August 1977
- Location: Lewisham, London, England

Parties
| National Front | Socialist Workers Party; Communist Party of Great Britain | Metropolitan Police |

Lead figures
| John Tyndall | Tony Cliff; Gordon McLennan | Sir David McNee |

Number
| 500 | 4,000 | 5,000 |

Casualties
- Injuries: 111
- Arrested: 214

The Battle of Lewisham took place on 13 August 1977, when 500 members of the far-right National Front (NF) attempted to march from New Cross to Lewisham in southeast London but were met by various counter-demonstrations of approximately 4,000 people that led to violent clashes between the two groups and between the anti-NF demonstrators and police. 5,000 police officers were present, and 56 officers were injured, 11 of whom were hospitalised. In total, 214 people were arrested. Later disturbances in Lewisham town centre saw the first use of police riot shields on the British mainland.

== Background ==
In the mid-1970s, New Cross and surrounding areas of South London became the focus of intense and sometimes violent political activity by neo-Nazis and members of the National Front, led by John Tyndall and the National Party, a breakaway faction led by John Kingsley Read. In 1976, the two organisations had a particularly strong showing in a local ward election to Lewisham London Borough Council. In response to this, the All Lewisham Campaign Against Racism and Fascism (ALCARAF) was launched with the support of local trade unions, anti-racist and anti-fascist groups.

On 30 May 1977, the police staged dawn raids in southeast London and arrested twenty-one young black people, including a 24-year-old woman, in connection with a series of muggings. Following the arrests, the police said they believed the "gang" was responsible "for 90 per cent of the street crime in south London over the past six months." They appeared at Camberwell Green Magistrates' Court on 1 June 1977, charged with various offences of "conspiracy to rob." During the hearings, some of the defendants fought with the police while spectators in the public gallery attempted to invade the court. The Lewisham 21 Defence Committee was set up soon after. They heavily criticised police tactics.

On 2 July 1977, the Lewisham 21 Defence Committee held a demonstration in New Cross. Up to 200 National Front supporters turned out to oppose it, throwing "rotten fruit and bags of caustic soda at marchers". More than 80 people were arrested.

== National Front march ==
In the following weeks, the National Front (NF) announced plans to march from New Cross to Lewisham. The NF national organiser, Martin Webster, told the press: 'We believe that the multi-racial society is wrong, is evil and we want to destroy it'. Local church leaders, Lewisham Council and the Liberal Party all called for the march to be banned, but Metropolitan Police Commissioner David McNee declined to make an application to the Home Secretary for a ban to be imposed. McNee reasoned that if a ban were imposed, then this would lead to "increasing pressure" to ban similar events and would be "abdicating his responsibility in the face of groups who threaten to achieve their ends by violent means." Deputy Assistant Commissioner David Helm requested that the National Front abandon their march voluntarily, but they refused. When Helm asked how they would respond if the march was banned, they said they would march elsewhere. This meant that any ban would have to be imposed and enforced across the entire Metropolitan Police district, which would still not prevent the NF from marching outside of the proscribed area. A ban on marching would also not prevent the NF from holding a static public meeting "perhaps in provocative circumstances", which would still attract a counter-demonstration. The police dilemma was further compounded by the limitations of the Public Order Act 1936, which granted no powers of arrest in the event that a ban was ignored.

There were political differences between anti-fascists about how best to respond, and as a result, there were three distinct mobilisations for the counter-demonstration. Earlier in the day of the National Front march, ALCARAF called for a peaceful demonstration. Later, on 13 August, the Ad Hoc Organising Committee urged people to occupy the National Front's planned meeting point at Clifton Rise in New Cross. A third organisation, the Anti Racist/Anti-Fascist Co-ordinating Committee (ARAFCC, the London-wide Federation of Anti-Racist/Anti-Fascist Committees, including ALCARAF) also mobilised activists from across Greater London and called for support for the ALCARAF march and for a physical attempt to stop the NF march.

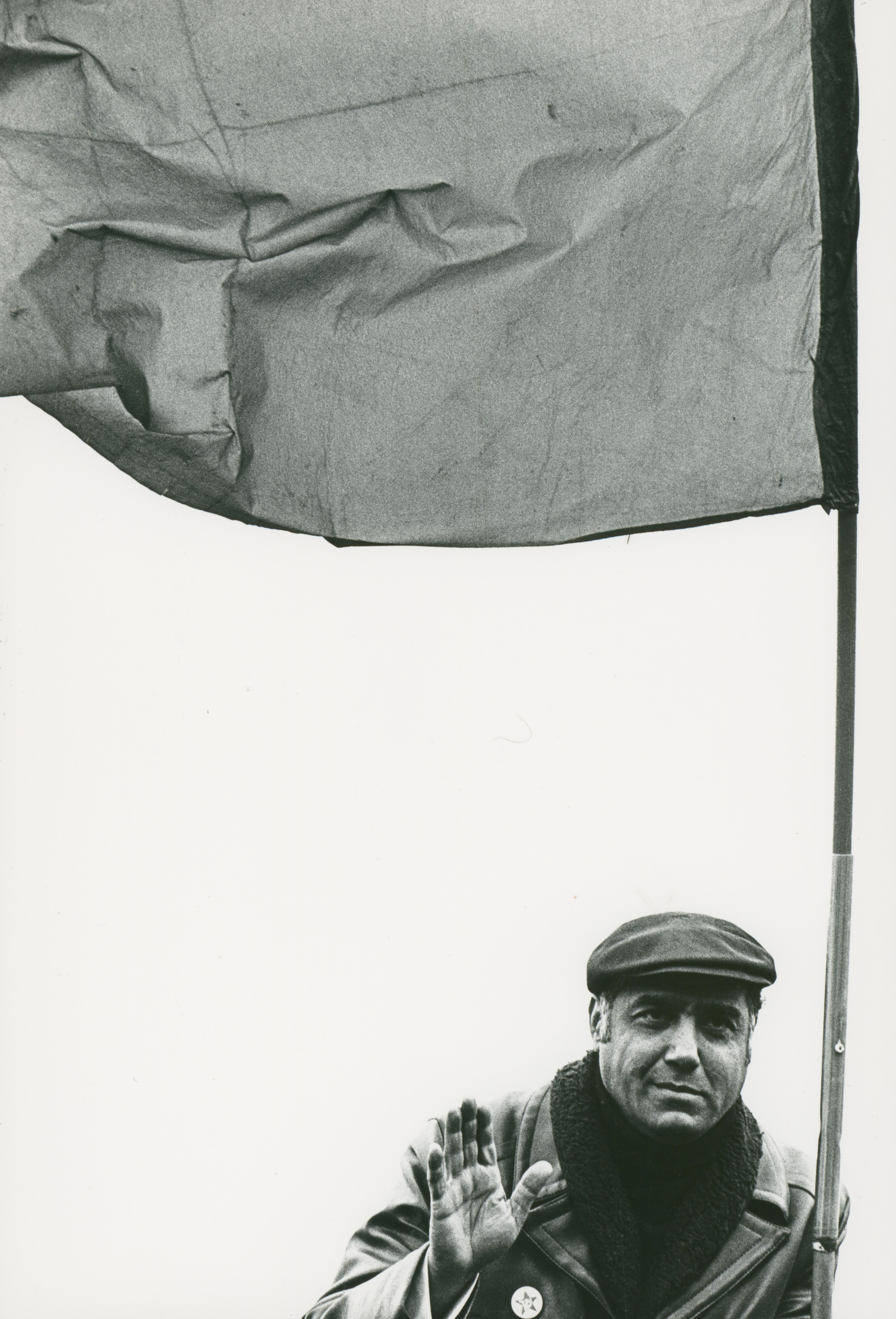
Anti-NF speaker

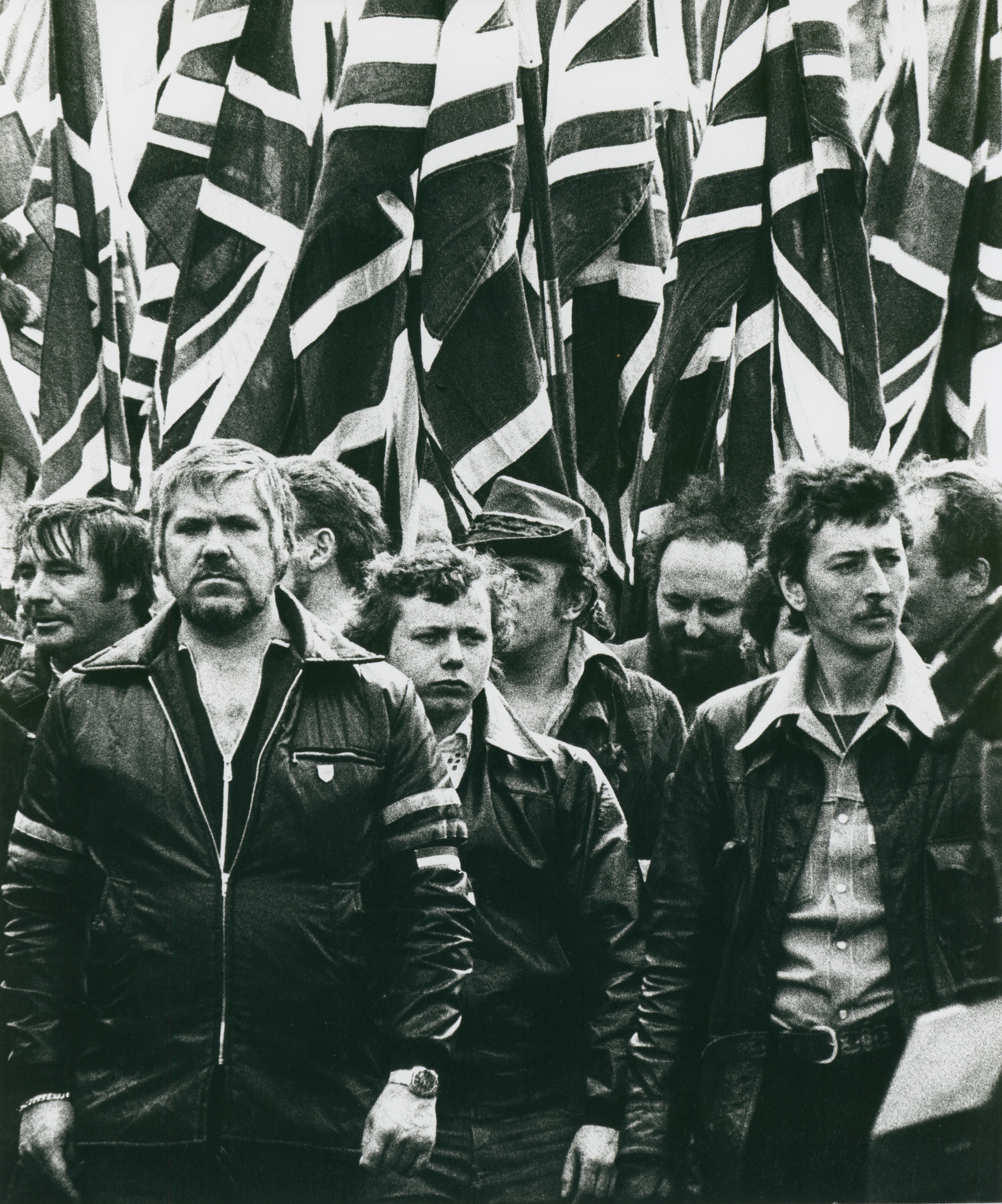
The National Front march

In the week before the demonstration, a meeting took place in a pub in Deptford between ARAFCC and the Socialist Workers' Party (SWP) Central Committee member responsible for their mobilisation. This meeting was intended to produce an agreed joint plan (as both organisations intended to physically block the streets to stop the NF march). However, the SWP insisted that the London Anti-Fascist Committees must accept the leading role of the SWP and mobilise their supporters under the direction of the SWP-appointed stewards. This demand was rejected by the ARAFCC (whose members included many veteran Anti-Fascists, some anarchists, Communist Party and YCL members and trade union activists). Thus, ARAFCC appointed its own stewards and made detailed plans to combine support for the ALCARAF demonstration in the morning with a physical blockade of New Cross Road in the afternoon. Although the official position of ALCARAF was that it was only mounting a peaceful demonstration on the morning of 13 August to show public opposition to the racist march planned for that afternoon, several ALCARAF activists collaborated with and supported the ARAFCC plans to mobilise for two events on the day.

== 13 August 1977 ==
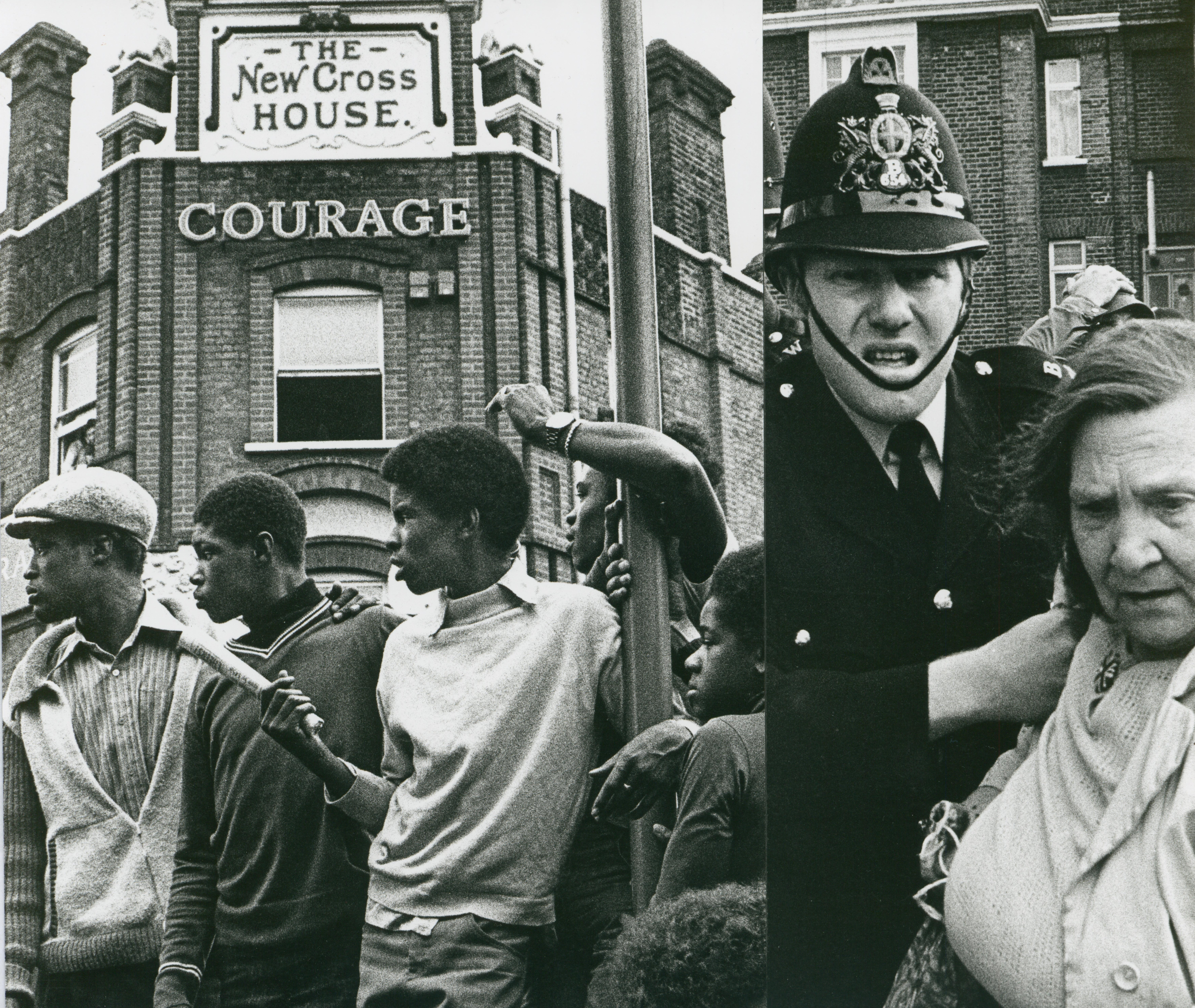
Residents look on, are escorted to safety

At 11:30 am, the ALCARAF demonstration gathered in Ladywell Fields, a park in Ladywell. Over 5000 people from more than 80 organisations heard speeches by the Mayor of Lewisham, the Bishop of Southwark, the exiled Bishop of Namibia and others. By agreement with the police the ALCARAF march halted at the top of Loampit Vale between Lewisham and New Cross. However, the Anti-Racist/Anti-Fascist Co-ordinating Committee stewards encouraged many marchers to go with them through the back-streets from Loampit Vale to New Cross Road. Through this method, many people from the ALCARAF march succeeded in getting into New Cross Road and onto the route of the NF march. Meanwhile, many of the protesters mobilised by the SWP had gathered in Clifton Rise, a side street off New Cross Road, but were then contained there by police and unable to get into the main road.

There were clashes when the police tried to push demonstrators further down Clifton Rise, away from where the National Front demonstrators were assembling in nearby Achilles Street. Police horses were sent into the crowd, and smoke bombs thrown.

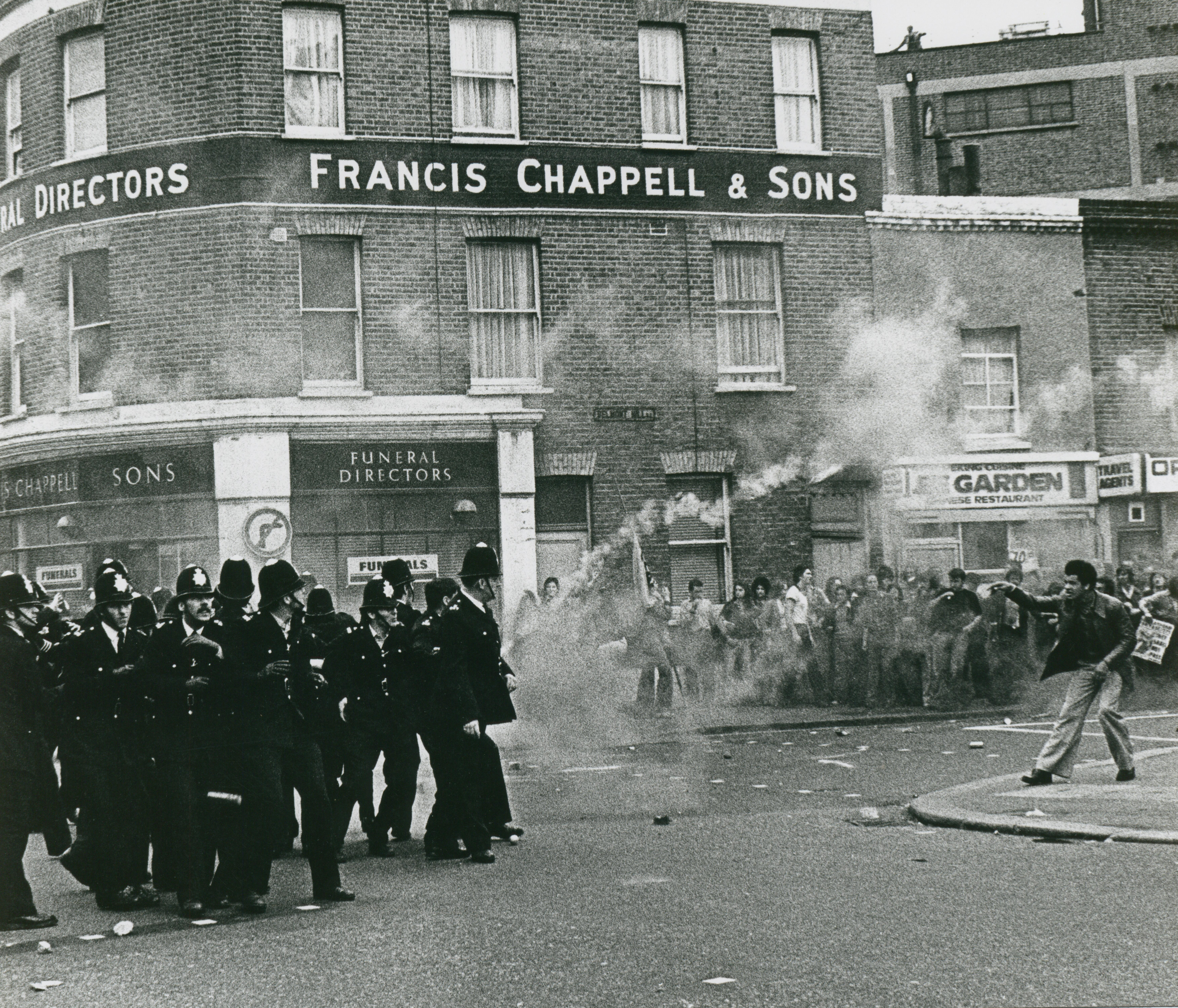
Police clash with demonstrators on Lewisham High Street

At 3.00 pm, the police escorted National Front marchers out of Achilles Street, up Pagnell Street and into the main New Cross Road, behind a large 'Stop the Muggers' banner. Although the police had cleared a route along New Cross Road, it was still lined with a great many people (many from the ALCARAF march in the morning). The marchers were pelted with bricks, smoke bombs, bottles and pieces of wood. Anti-NF demonstrators managed to briefly break through police lines and attack the back of the march, separating them from the main body. The protesters then burnt captured National Front banners.

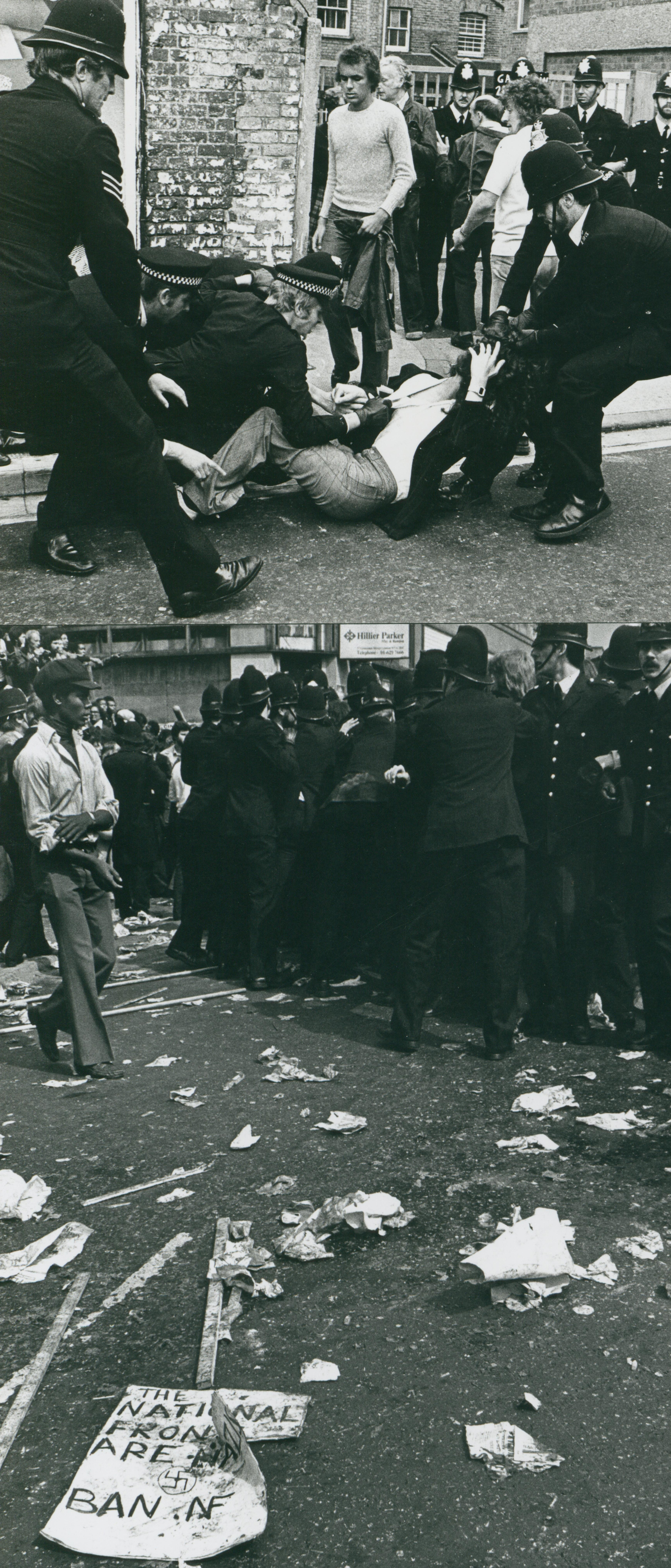
Police tackle a demonstrator

The police separated National Front and anti-fascists, and mounted police cleared a path through the crowd attempting to block the progress of the march towards Deptford Broadway. Police led the march through deserted streets of Lewisham, with crowds held back by roadblocks throughout the whole area. Marchers were flanked by police three deep on either side, with 24 mounted police in front.

Meanwhile, the anti-NF demonstrators joined by increasing numbers of local people (especially young people), made their way to Lewisham Town Centre, where they blocked the High Street. Due to the inability to gather in the town centre, the National Front conducted a brief rally in a parking lot on Connington Road and then were escorted onto waiting trains by the police.

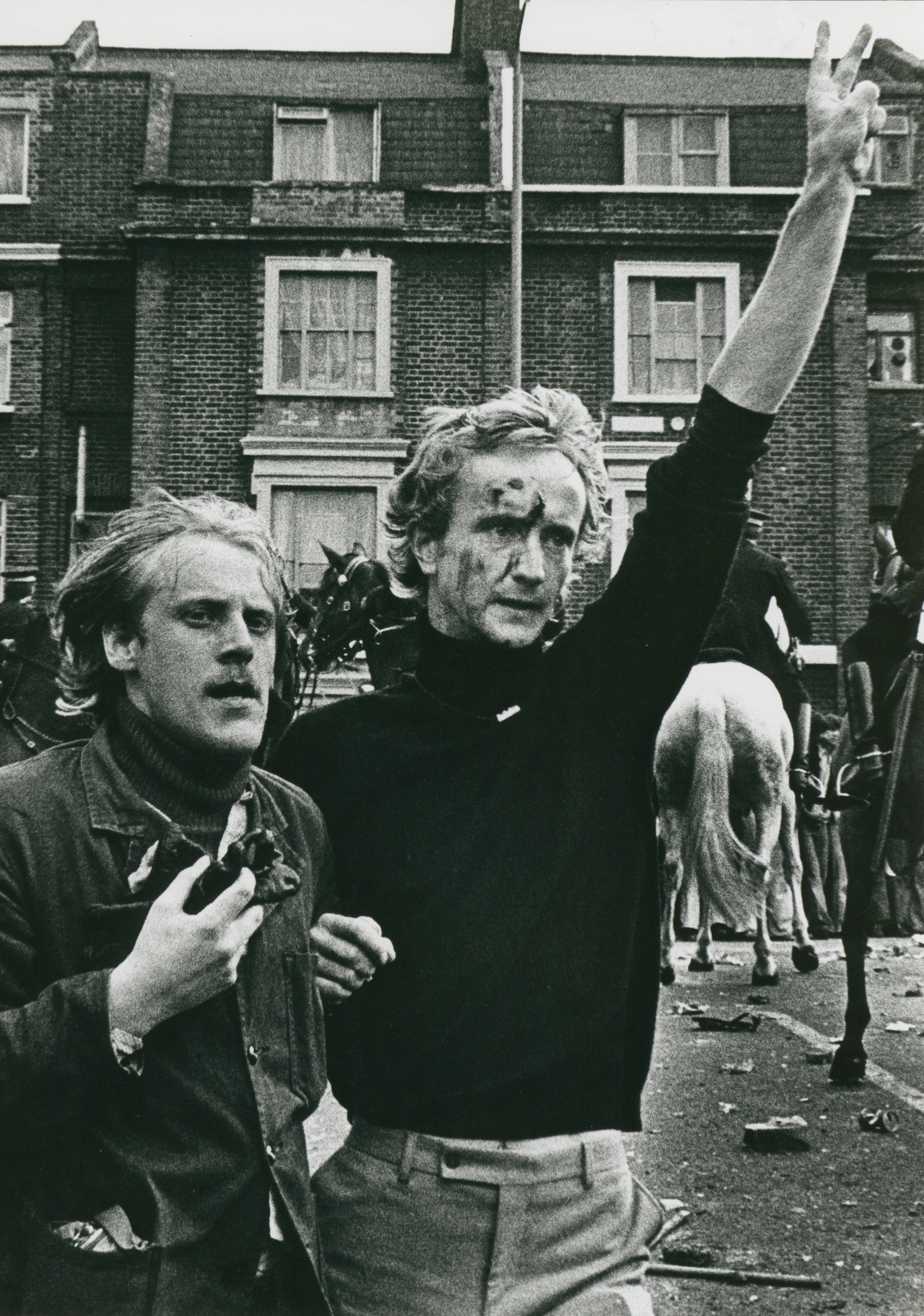
A demonstrator makes a "V for Victory" sign

Clashes continued between the police and counter-demonstrators, the latter largely unaware that the National Front had already left the area. The police brought out riot shields for the first time on the British mainland, and baton charges and mounted police were used in an attempt to disperse the crowd. Bricks and bottles were thrown at police, and police vehicles were damaged.

There was a brief period when the police completely lost control of the centre of Lewisham (later dubbed the People's Republic of Lewisham Clock-Tower). There was also an apparent break-down in the police chain of command, with officers driving vehicles at high speed up and down the Lewisham High Street under a hail of bricks and bottles until one crashed into a railway bridge, and the police charged to prevent the three occupants from being attacked by the demonstrators. There was also some minor looting of shops, and a vehicle was set on fire before police restored control of the area.

111 people in the march were injured, and up to 214 people were arrested during the clashes.

== Legacy ==
On the 40th anniversary of the Battle of Lewisham in 2017, a maroon plaque was unveiled by Lewisham council Councillor Joan Millbank at 3 Batavia Mews, on the corner of New Cross Road and Clifton Rise, where the resistance to the National Front march began.

In October 2019, a new public artwork commemorating the Battle of Lewisham was unveiled on Lewisham Way in New Cross. Designed in consultation with local people, it was inspired by 1970s zines. It drew heavily on many of the iconic images taken on 13 August 1977. Prominent in the design is the civil liberties campaigner, Darcus Howe, in recognition of his role in the events of 13 August 1977 and wider impact on UK society.

== See also ==
- Battle of Cable Street
- Joseph Pearce
