= Right-wing terrorism in the United Kingdom =

Right-wing terrorism from the British extreme right, also referred to as extreme right-wing terrorism (ERWT), (Note: Extreme right-wing terrorism (ERWT) is a term coined by the Intelligence and Security Committee of Parliament (ISC) referring to "the segment of the far-right movement involved in politically motivated violence".) has become a growing threat in the United Kingdom, featuring cultural nationalism, white nationalism, and white supremacist ideologies. Seventy people associated with the far-right have been convicted of more than two hundred terrorist offences between 2007 and 2022. The origins of ERWT can be traced back to the British Union of Fascists, individuals associated with the National Front (NF) and British National Party, and the 1999 London bombings.

In 2012, a Home Affairs Select Committee reported "persuasive evidence" regarding the possible threat from the far-right, and the following year, the UK government deemed that right-wing extremism was of "very low risk". In 2016, the perpetrator convicted of the murder of Jo Cox was linked to British far-right political groups including the NF and the English Defence League. By the end of the year, National Action was prescribed as a terrorist organisation, becoming the first extreme right-wing group banned by the UK government since the Second World War.

In 2018, the Home Office reported that the threat from ERWT had been growing. The following year, Metropolitan Police assistant commissioner, Neil Basu, declared that ERWT was his "fastest-growing problem", and according to Europol, the UK had the highest number of far-right terrorist attacks and plots in Europe for the year. In 2022, the Intelligence and Security Committee of Parliament published a report on ERWT which stated that key views of various far-right groups include white supremacy, cultural nationalism, opposition to immigration and the Identitarian movement. In 2026, Director General of MI5, Ken McCallum, described right-wing violence over the past year as the most notable trend.

== Background ==
Between 2007 and 2022, seventy people associated with the far-right have been convicted of more than two hundred terrorist offences, based on eight differenent offences from the Terrorism Act 2000 and 2006. In 2013, the UK government assessed that right-wing extremism was a "very low risk to national security"; this changed the following year after the emergence of the neo-Nazi group National Action. ERWT includes cultural nationalism, white nationalism and white supremacist ideologies.

In February 2012, a Home Affairs Select Committee reported "persuasive evidence" regarding the possible threat from the far-right, referring to the criticism of the government's Prevent strategy. The committee also referenced the growth of such groups as well as connections with European organisations. Chairman of the committee, Keith Vaz MP, stated that "more resources need to be directed to these threats and to preventing radicalisation through the internet and in private spaces". The Home Office responded stating that the strategy primarily "tackles the threat from home-grown terrorism on and off line".

In 2018 February, Mark Rowley, the outgoing head of UK counter-terror policing, revealed that four far-right terror plots had been foiled since the Westminster attack in March 2017. In November, the Home Office reported that the threat from ERWT had been growing. The government added that in the previous five years there had been four lone-actor terrorist attacks, including the murder of Jo Cox, motivated to varying degrees by extreme right-wing ideologies. The department also stated that prior to 2014, far-right activity was confined to a small, established group that promoted anti-immigration and white supremacist views, and that these groups were assessed present a very low risk to national security.

Since 2014, there has been a significant increase in the threat from ERWT in the UK. In response, experts in security and intelligence have increased monitoring of threats from groups and individuals holding extreme right-wing views. Counter Terrorism Policing reported that between March 2017 and December 2021, 12 of 32 imminent terrorism plots that were thwarted were ERWT.

The Independent Reviewer of Terrorism Legislation reported in 2022 that one in five counter-terrorism investigations and 40% of terrorism-related arrests were related to far-right perspectives. That same year, the Intelligence and Security Committee of Parliament published a report on ERWT which said that key views of various far-right groups include white supremacy, cultural nationalism, opposition to immigration and the Identitarian movement. Far-right groups and individuals disproportionately target ethnic minority and religious groups, LGBT+ groups, politicians, and public figures. The threat by the extreme right had moved from being a political movement to being a greater threat to national security. On 31 March 2022, of the 233 prisoners in custody for terrorism-connected offences, 57 were categorised as extreme-right.

Home Office figures for England and Wales for the year to September 2025, demonstrated that 20% of the total referrals to Prevent were because of concerns over extreme right-wing ideology – an increase from 1,480 to 2,103 in the previous 12 months.

With rising anti-migrant threats from the far-right and years of anti-Muslim hostility, Director General of MI5, Ken McCallum, in October 2026 during an annual threat update, described "a complex area, but one certainly fuelled by political hate narratives and online subcultures", in which "extremist versions of anti-immigration and anti-Muslim grievance are tipping into terrorist intent". McCallum described right-wing violence over the past year as the most notable trend with immigration centres and asylum hotels becoming increasingly likely targets for anti-migrant extremists, contributing to a rise in the UK Threat Levels.

== Origins ==
In the UK, ERWT can be traced back to Sir Oswald Mosley’s British Union of Fascists, an ultranationalist group that was subsequently banned in 1940. In Studies in Conflict & Terrorism, Jupp wrote that "Politically motivated violence and terrorism have been persistent features of this movement, which comprises a complex assortment of political parties, street movements, extremist organizations and atomized lone actors advocating a diverse range of ideologies and narratives." This includes individuals associated with the National Front and British National Party, with David Copeland's London bombings serving as a notable example.

Over three successive weekends between 17 and 30 April 1999, David Copeland set off homemade nail bombs in Brixton in south London; at Brick Lane, Spitalfields, in the East End; and at the Admiral Duncan pub in Soho in the West End. Copeland, who became known as the "London nail bomber", was a neo-Nazi militant and a former member of the BNP and the National Socialist Movement. The bombings were aimed at London's Black, Bengali, and LGBT communities. Copeland was convicted of murder in 2000 and given six life sentences. Copeland killed 3 people and injured 140 others.

== Timeline ==
=== 2008–2019 ===
In June 2008, a Nazi sympathiser was convicted of three terrorism charges, having kept four home-made and other weapons in his home. He was convicted for preparing, possessing articles, and collecting information, for terrorist purposes; and also admitted to thousands of images of child pornography. In December 2008, a neo-Nazi was sentenced to more than seven years for racially aggravated harassment and possession of material for terrorist purposes. In June 2009, a neo-Nazi who wanted to target 'non-British' people was jailed for more than seven years.

In April 2013, Mohammed Saleem, an 82-year-old Muslim man, was stabbed to death by Pavlo Lapshyn, a Ukrainian national and far-right extremist who had arrived in Birmingham five days prior. Lapshyn later went on to bomb three mosques across the West Midlands in June and July. There were no further casualties and he was arrested on 18 July.

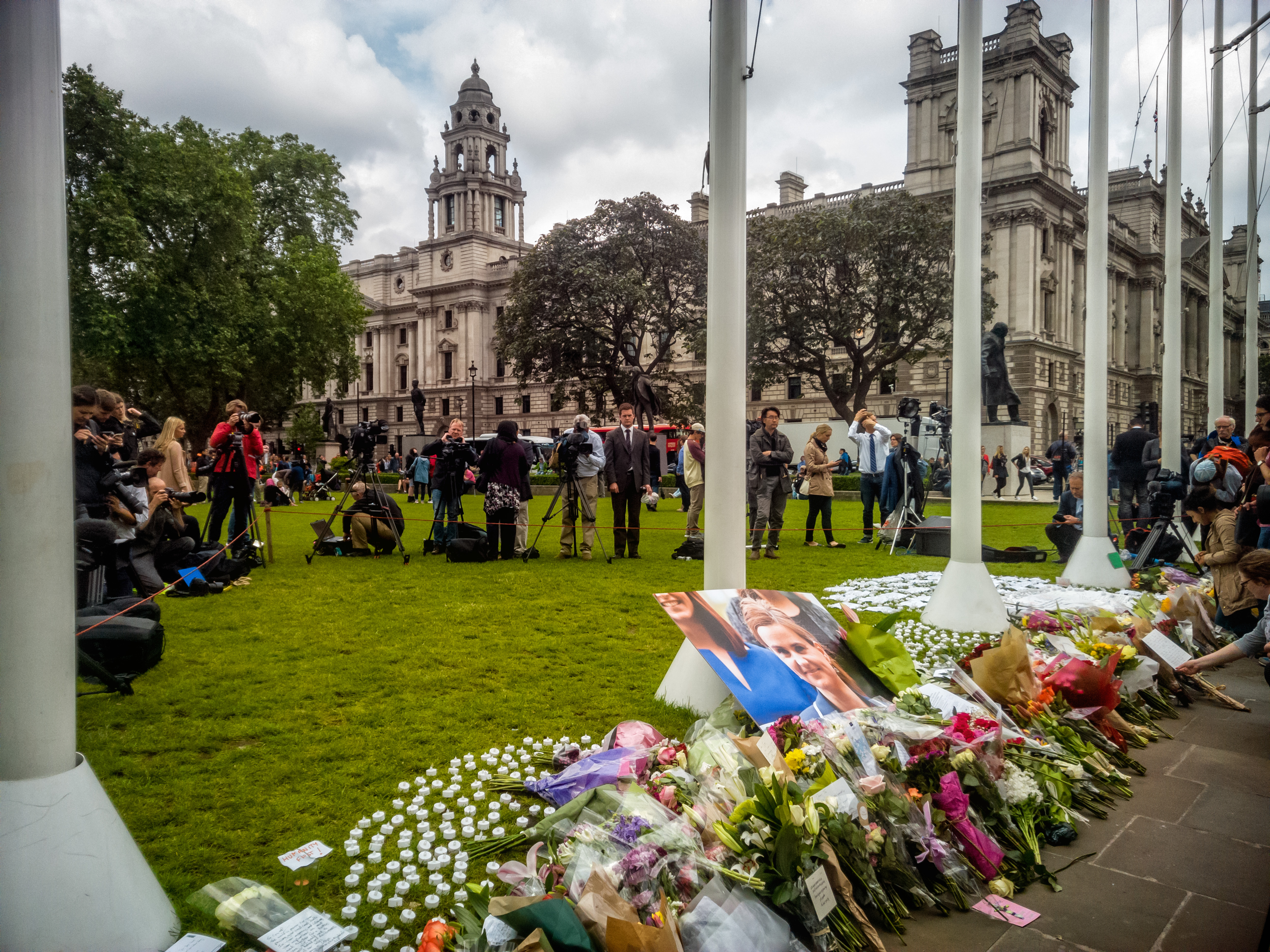
Cox's memorial at Parliament Square in London, June 2016

In June 2016, member of parliament, Jo Cox, was murdered by Thomas Alexander Mair who had links to British and American far-right political groups including the National Front, the U.S. neo-Nazi organisation National Alliance, and the English Defence League. Writers at The Guardian suggested that he targeted Cox, because he viewed her as "one of 'the collaborators' [and] a traitor" to white people. In December, Home Secretary Amber Rudd designated National Action as a terrorist organisation, becoming the first extreme right-wing group banned by the UK government since the Second World War. In the years that followed, many figures were linked to the group and arrested on suspicion of plots to commit extremist acts, such as plotting to kill Rosie Cooper, in a bid to "replicate" the murder of Jo Cox, and the possession of terrorist manifestos.

In June 2017, multiple far-right terrorist incidents occurred. Darren Osborne used a van to attack Muslim worshippers at Finsbury Park mosque, killing 1 and injuring 11. Ethan Stables planned an attack with a machete on a Gay Pride event in Cumbria, and was later sentenced to life in prison. Jack Renshaw, a neo-Nazi from Lancashire, was charged with the attempted murder of Labour MP Rosie Cooper, and also subsequently jailed for life. The following month, Centre for Research and Evidence on Security Threats stated that: "Although the vast majority of far-right activists are non-violent, far-right activism has security implications in the UK and globally. Risks associated with the far-right include large-scale acts of terrorism, hate crime, and public order issues. Far-right narratives also undermine community cohesion and can support narratives offered by opposing extremist groups."

In June 2018, Jack Renshaw, an alleged former member of NA, admitted planning to murder Rosie Cooper MP using a gladius machete as an act of terrorism, and sentenced to three years in prison. Renshaw was additionally convicted of four child sexual offences at the same trial and sentenced to an additional 18 months.

In May 2019, the Royal United Services Institute criticised the Home Office for its "apparent unwillingness" to engage with the threats from ERWP. The institute anticipated further increase in right-wing extremist activity in the UK as well as Europe, describing a "leaderless vacuum in which these groups can flourish". Four months later, the Metropolitan Police assistant commissioner, Neil Basu, declared that ERWT was his "fastest-growing problem" and that there was the clear correlation between far-right activity and the rise of hate crimes; while being unsure if the link was "causal", given the history of the threat from the far-right in the country.

=== 2020–present ===
In June 2020, Europol reported that the UK had the highest number of far-right terrorist attacks and plots in Europe during the previous year, with one attack and three foiled. The attack was a 50-year-old in Stanwell attacking cars with non-white drivers before stabbing a Bulgarian teenager. The man was targeting Muslims, and shouted: "All Muslims should die, white supremacists rule. I’m going to murder a Muslim." The Independent reported that a plot referred to in the report was believed to be a teenage neo-Nazi who had planned attacks on synagogues and other targets in Durham, England.

In September 2021, a neo-Nazi member of "The British Hand" was convicted for attempting to acquire a gun to shoot his friend as part of a terrorist plot. The group, which consisted of a small cell of up to 15 young members, was founded by a 14 year old teenager in August 2020 who was also convicted.

In April 2024, the Terrorgram Collective was added to the list of proscribed organisations, becoming the sixth extreme right-wing group proscribed. The National Centre for Social Research described the collective as "a network of fascist, neo-Nazi and white supremacist channels on Telegram that label terrorists as ‘Saints’ and praise their attacks, including the 1999 London nail bombs, the 2011 Norway attack and the 2019 Christchurch attack." Home Secretary James Cleverly labelled the international group "an online network of neo-fascists" and stated that the collective "spreads vile propaganda and aims to radicalise young people to conduct heinous terrorist acts". The UK was the first country to proscribe the group, with the United States and Canada following suit.

In January 2025, a white supremacist with a tattoo of Adolf Hitler’s signature on his arm was sentenced to life in prison for attempting to kill an asylum seeker, stabbing him in the hand and chest. He described the victim as "one of the Channel migrants" and part of an "invasive species". The prosecutor described the text he attempted to post on X after the incident "bears all the hallmarks of being an extreme rightwing terrorist manifesto", and that the man "identified and targeted his victim on the basis of his ethnicity". The judge said he was motivated by his adoption of "a far-right neo-Nazi mindset" and that it was "undoubtedly a terrorist attack."

In August 2025, a teenager inspired by Hitler, Mussolini and Anders Breivik, was sentenced to 10 years in custody for planning a terrorist attack on an Islamic centre in Greenock, Inverclyde, after pleading guilty to two terrorism offences. According to prosecutors, he was arrested at the centre while carrying "a German-manufactured Glock-type air pistol, ammunition, ball bearings, gas cartridges and aerosol cans". He had boasted on social media platform Telegram about his intent to set fire to the centre.

In October 2025, three Nazi supporters were convicted of terrorist offences, with plans of attacks on mosques and synagogues, including an attack on an Islamic education centre in Leeds. They were sentenced to 8 to 11 years in prison, having amassed 200 weapons and after their online group became infiltrated by undercover officers. Counter-terrorism police said the group, Einsatz, facilitated an "echo chamber of extreme right-wing views where they shared horrific racial slurs, glorified mass murderers and encouraged violence against anyone deemed an enemy". The group were "inspired by SS tactics and supremacist ideology".

In May 2026, a nineteen year old who had been radicalised by neo-Nazi extremism and been in contact with far-right groups, was sentenced to a minimum of fifteen years and six months in prison for a "terrorism motivated attack" in Bristol in August 2025, during which she attempted to behead a Kurdish barber with an axe.

In June 2026, a 36-year-old man was arrested as the suspected perpetrator of a stabbing spree targeting Muslim people on the streets of Edinburgh, wounding five people. The perpetrator is alleged to have shouted xenophobic and Islamophobic slurs at the time of the arrest. The suspect was charged with attempted murder with a "terrorist connection".

In September 2026, a former councillor was jailed for five years and three months. Having previously admitted to "encouraging terrorism and sharing a manifesto by Norwegian mass killer Anders Breivik", he had also discussed "killing migrants when they arrive on their boats", as well as "poisoning Jews and Muslims". He denied possession of The Great Replacement manifesto, written by white supremacist Brenton Tarrant responsible for the Christchurch mosque shootings, having described the need for a "bigger impact" in referencing to the shootings. The judge described him as holding "deeply held abhorrent and racist views".
