= Tim Bale =

British political scientist (born 1965)

Timothy Paul Bale (born 4 November 1965) is an English political scientist who is professor of politics at Queen Mary, University of London.

Bale was born in Frome, Somerset. He was educated at Eastbourne Grammar School and Gonville and Caius College, Cambridge, where he read history. He then studied for an MA in history at Northwestern University, Chicago, before changing disciplines and completing a PhD in politics at the University of Sheffield. He spent several years as a politics lecturer at Sheffield and Victoria University, Wellington before becoming a senior lecturer, then professor of politics at the University of Sussex. In 2012 he moved from Sussex to take up a similar position at Queen Mary.

His main research interests are in the fields of British, European and Comparative politics, especially in relation to centre-right and conservative politics. He was the founding convenor of the Political Studies Association specialist group on Conservatives and Conservatism, which brings together leading scholars with an academic interest in this area.

From September 2019 to December 2020, Bale was deputy director of UK in a Changing Europe. He is also a member of the board of the Social Market Foundation.

== Selected publications ==
- The Conservative Party: From Thatcher to Cameron (2010, second edition 2016)
- Five Year Mission: The Labour Party Under Ed Miliband (2015)
- The Conservative Party After Brexit: Turmoil and Transformation (2023)
