= List of British far-right groups (1945–present) =

Far right, extreme right, hard right, radical right, and fascist right are terms used to discuss the position a group or person occupies within right-wing politics. The terms are often used to imply that someone is an extremist. The terms have been used by different scholars in somewhat conflicting ways.

Far right politics are usually supremacist; a belief that superiority and inferiority is an innate reality between individuals and groups, and a complete rejection of the concept of social equality as a norm. Far right politics often support segregation; the separation of groups deemed to be superior from groups deemed to be inferior. Far right politics also commonly include authoritarianism, nativism, racism and xenophobia.

Many of these parties stem from either the legacy of Oswald Mosley's British Union of Fascists, or the political views held by either John Tyndall, Andrew Fountaine, Eddy Morrison, Ian Anderson, Colin Jordan and A. K. Chesterton, along with those of their parties like the British National Party, National Front, National Socialist Movement and National Democrats over the last 40 years.

The ideologies usually associated with the far right include fascism, Nazism and other ultra-nationalist, religiously extreme or reactionary ideologies.

The term radical right refers to sections of the far right that promote views which are very conservative in traditional left-right terms, but which aim to break with prevailing institutions and practices. The radical right does not have a clear structure, but rather consists of overlapping subcultures with diverse styles of rhetoric, dress, and symbolism whose cohesion comes from the use of alternative system of communications.

The flag of the British Union of Fascists. The party was created in 1932 and banned in 1940.

== 1940s ==
=== British League of Ex-Servicemen and Women ===
The British League of Ex-Servicemen and Women had its roots in a 1937 former soldiers' welfare group. This was taken over by Jeffrey Hamm in 1944 and became a Mosleyite group. It was absorbed into the Union Movement in 1948.

=== British Peoples' Party ===
The British People's Party (BPP) was formed in 1939 by BUF member and former Labour Party MP John Beckett. The party, which campaigned against the Second World War, continued to exist until 1954.

=== English National Association ===
The English National Association (ENA) was a political group active in the United Kingdom during the Second World War, founded in 1942. The ENA, Seeking to regroup former members of the British Union of Fascists, the group was founded by John Webster and Edward Godfrey and was originally called the British National Party (BNP). The group contested the 1943 Acton by-election with Godfrey officially running as independent, although he finished bottom of the poll with 258 votes. It did not survive the war.

=== Union Movement ===
The Union Movement was established by Oswald Mosley in 1948 as an amalgamation of a number of groups formed by ex-members of the British Union of Fascists. The party advocated a Pan-European nationalism policy that Mosley termed Europe a Nation and on this basis sought close links with parties in other European countries through initiatives such as the National Party of Europe and the European Social Movement. It also campaigned domestically against immigration at home and contested a number of elections, albeit without having any candidates elected. The party continued in existence until 1973 when it became the Action Party.

== 1950s ==
=== British Empire Party ===
The British Empire Party was a minor right-wing party in the United Kingdom. It was founded in the early 1950s by P. J. Ridout, a former member of the Imperial Fascist League. It had a single candidate in the 1951 general election.

=== League of Empire Loyalists ===
The League of Empire Loyalists was a ginger group established in 1954, campaigning against the dissolution of the British Empire in the 1950s and 1960s. It was a small group of current or former members of the Conservative Party led by Arthur K. Chesterton, a former leading figure in the British Union of Fascists, who had served under Oswald Mosley. The League found support from a number of Conservative Party members, although they were disliked very much by the leadership. They were well known for various stunts at Conservative Party meetings and conferences (acting as a constant irritant to the party). As time progressed, the group became primarily concerned with opposing non-white immigration into Britain and were instrumental in the founding (with other right-wing and neo-Nazi groups) of the National Front in February 1967.

=== White Defence League ===
The White Defence League was formed in 1958 as a splinter group from the League of Empire Loyalists, formed from those who resented the LEL's refusal to contest elections and its strong links to the Conservative Party. The WDL was vehemently against non-white immigration and used the provocative marching techniques popularised by Oswald Mosley, although with much less support than Mosley had in his heyday. In 1960 the party merged with the National Labour Party to form the old British National Party. It was led by Colin Jordan and produced its own newspaper Black and White News sporadically between 1958 and 1959. John Tyndall had also been a member.

=== The National Labour Party ===
The National Labour Party was another splinter group from the League of Empire Loyalists, founded by John Bean in 1957. The group was similar to the White Defence League, albeit along the lines of a political party rather than a pressure group, and the two merged to form the British National Party in 1960.

== 1960s ==
=== British National Party ===
The British National Party was formed in 1960 by the merger of the National Labour Party and the White Defence League. The party was led by John Bean, with Andrew Fountaine holding the position of Party President, and other leading members including John Tyndall, Colin Jordan (who served as Activities Organiser), Denis Pirie and Ted Budden. The widow of Arnold Leese served as vice-president of the party. The party's main policies were an end to immigration, repatriation of immigrants and belief in an international Jewish conspiracy. Elements within the party also expressed support for Nazism and a paramilitary arm, Spearhead, was set up by Tyndall. The BNP managed to secure an 8.1% share of the vote in Deptford in the 1960 London County Council (LCC) elections, a large result for a new party without name recognition. After some in-fighting Jordan and Tyndall left in 1962 to set up the National Socialist Movement, leaving the BNP in the hands of Bean. The group merged into the National Front in 1967.

=== The National Socialist Movement ===
The National Socialist Movement was formed on 20 April 1962, Adolf Hitler's birthday, by Colin Jordan, with John Tyndall as his deputy. as a splinter group from the original British National Party. A strongly neo-Nazi group it campaigned against "race traitor" Patrick Gordon Walker, the Foreign Secretary. It collapsed in the late 1960s and was replaced by the British Movement.

=== The Greater Britain Movement ===
The Greater Britain Movement was a political group formed by John Tyndall in 1964 after he split from Colin Jordan's National Socialist Movement. The group broke from open Nazism to follow what Tyndall called "Authoritarian Nationalism". It was absorbed into the National Front in 1967 with members admitted 'on probation', leading to the GBM ceasing to exist.

=== The British Movement ===
The British Movement (BM), later called the British National Socialist Movement (BNSM), was a neo-Nazi political party founded by Colin Jordan in 1968 as a continuation of the NSM. It contested the UK general elections in 1970 and in February 1974 on a neo-Nazi platform, attracting little support. Michael McLaughlin became the leader in 1975 and won the BM new support from the growing racist skinhead and football hooligan movements. The group disappeared in the mid-1980s following revelations from Ray Hill but returned in September 1983 and has continued to exist in some form to the present day.

=== The Racial Preservation Society ===
The Racial Preservation Society (RPS) was a right-wing pressure group opposed to non-white immigration and in favour of white supremacy. It was established in 1965 by Robin Beauclaire and Jimmy Doyle as a propaganda organisation. Elements of the group were associated with the National Democratic Party and others with the National Front although it continued to exist at least until the 1970s.

=== The National Democratic Party ===
The National Democratic Party was formed by Dr David Brown of the RPS in 1966. The group attracted local pockets of support but struggled to cope with the emergence of the National Front the following year and faded in the 1970s.

=== The National Front ===
The National Front (NF) was formed in 1967 by the amalgamation of a number of other groups. Initially led by A.K. Chesterton it went through a number of stages of development. John Tyndall led the party twice during the 1970s, a time marked by his clashes with John O'Brien and John Kingsley Read, the latter forming his own National Party in 1976. Nonetheless, the NF also reached its zenith in terms of support during the 1970s and had as many as 20,000 members in 1974.

The NF failed to make any headway at the 1979 general election, resulting in the group falling apart as various factions left to found the British Democratic Party, the Constitutional Movement and the New National Front. Under Andrew Brons the remaining members were regrouped for a time but in 1986 the NF fell apart completely as two parties, the Official National Front and the Flag Group, emerged. The Flag Group eventually regained control of the NF name in 1990 and the party has continued to date, albeit very much in the shadow of the British National Party.

=== The National Independence Party ===
The National Independence Party was a minor far-right group established in the late 1960s that was close to John O'Brien. Although never a national force the party enjoyed support in the London Borough of Haringey where it had a councillor elected.

=== Minor groups ===
The Anti-Communist Commando was led by Victor Norris, a pro-Rhodesia activist and sometime member of the National Socialist Group, throughout the 1960s. Targeting left-wing demonstrations where it attempted to provoke violence, the Commando disappeared when Norris was jailed in 1969.

The National Socialist Group, led by the Olliffe brothers and Dave Courtney, was a paramilitary organisation linked to the British Movement in the late 1960s. Following the conviction of a number of members for possession of illegal weapons the NSG disappeared.

== 1970s ==
=== National Party ===
The National Party was formed by John Kingsley Read after he was replaced by Tyndall as NF chairman in 1976. The group brought together populists and Strasserites. It proved short-lived.

=== 9 November Society ===
The November 9th Society is a neo-Nazi group established by Terry Flynn in 1977 and subsequently led by Kevin Quinn. A hardline Nazi group, it has since represented as a political party under the name British First Party.

=== British Democratic Party ===
The British Democratic Party (BDP) was a short-lived party formed in 1979 when the Leicester branch of the NF under the leadership of Anthony Reed Herbert broke away from the main party. During his work with the BDP, Ray Hill secretly took part in a World in Action documentary about the party, during the course of which Reed Herbert and other leading members were put in touch with an American (who was also working with the show) from whom they could buy guns. When the programme was broadcast, the BDP was left badly discredited. (Ultimately, when he returned to Britain, no charges were laid). It became a founder group of the British National Party in 1982.

=== Constitutional Movement ===
The Constitutional Movement was another NF splinter group from 1979, this time led by Andrew Fountaine. right wing political group in the United Kingdom. It contested the 1981 GLC elections. After it changed its name to the Nationalist Party, it contested only five seats in the 1983 general election. The party soon disappeared, with many members joining the BNP.

=== Minor groups ===
The British Defence League was a very short-lived group led by John O'Brien in 1970 that was absorbed by the National Democratic Party.

The Integralists were a small body of intellectuals led by Russian emigre George Knuppfer active during the early 1970s. The body, which concerned itself with conspiracy theories regarding international finance, was close to John O'Brien. It produced its own journal Right.

The National Party of St George was a local far right party based in Reading, Berkshire. It was close to John O'Brien.

The Newcastle Democratic Movement was an anti-immigration group based in Newcastle-upon-Tyne that merged with the National Front in December 1971. Their membership provided the basis of a new large party group on Tyneside.

The National Socialist British Workers' Party was largely the work of one man, G.R. Jenin, whose National Observer published Nazi Party material in the early 1970s.

Trade Unions Against Immigration (TRU-AIM) was a joint initiative of the National Front and British Movement. Led by Bill Whitbread it hoped to infiltrate the mainstream trade union movement but was eventually scuppered by internal differences.

The National Assembly was formed by Mary Stanton in 1974 as an umbrella organisation for various anti-immigration activists. Changing its name to the Anti-Communism Movement in 1977 it continued to exist until the early 1980s.

The United Party was a minor group based in Derby that existed briefly during 1974. It merged with the supporters of Leicester NF chairman John Kynaston and the Enoch Powell support group of Stan Wright to form the English National Party, which presented candidates in the October 1974 United Kingdom general election.

The British National Party was a Leeds-based group led by Eddy Morrison during the mid-1970s. The group, which was linked to the League of St. George, helped to organised the White Defence Associations, armed gangs of vigilantes active in areas of racial tension. Morrison would later join John Tyndall's BNP following its formation in 1982.

The National Democratic Freedom Movement was a violent group led by Morrison, David Myatt and Joe Short of Column 88.

The Britannia Party was a short-lived breakaway from the NF, organised by Henry Lord and Marion Powell from 1978 to the following year.

== 1980s ==
=== British National Party ===
The British National Party was formed by John Tyndall in 1982 from his New National Front and other minor groups. Subsequently, led by Nick Griffin the party achieved levels of political representation hitherto unseen by the far-right in Britain, including seats in the European Parliament in 2009. The party subsequently split, and declined to an electoral irrelevance winning only 1,667 votes at the 2015 election, though as of 2015, it continues to exist.

=== The National Socialist Action Party ===
The National Socialist Action Party was formed in 1982 by Tony Malski, who split from the British Movement, which was by that period in terminal decline. Malski wanted to form a party based solely on National Socialism. The group had a military structure and was divided into four distinct groups, although membership was always tiny at best. They produced a magazine, The European, which called for the formation of a paramilitary army which would be distinct from the NSAP. Malski assumed the title of Field Marshal. The Party comprised some of his neighbours in South Oxhey.

The group had connections in France and these were exposed in 1984 by the Channel 4 documentary about Ray Hill, during which Malski was shown by a hidden camera claiming to have imported explosives. The NSAP went into immediate decline after this exposé. Malski, who was dismissed by many on the far right in Britain as something of a Walter Mitty character, has occasionally surfaced at meetings, including speeches by David Irving, although the NSAP is defunct. The party's last appearance in the public eye came in 1986 when member Graham Paton was convicted of sending propaganda and a concealed razor blade to an anti-apartheid activist. Most recently he has been found guilty of racially harassing his neighbour, a woman of Pakistani origin. He has, on occasion, stood for election to St Albans District Council, as an independent.

=== Our Nation ===
Our Nation was a minor movement briefly led by Martin Webster. He set it up after his expulsion from the NF in December 1983 but it proved unsuccessful.

=== Official National Front ===
The Official National Front was one of the two groups into which the NF split in 1986. Its members belonged to the "Political Soldier" tendency that eschewed electoral politics. Leading members included Nick Griffin, Derek Holland and Patrick Harrington. It disappeared in 1990 with the emergence of the Third Way.

=== Flag Group ===
The Flag Group was the other of the two NF factions. It sought to continue on the path previously followed by the NF in contesting elections and organising on a strongly anti-immigration basis. This group eventually regained control of the NF name.

=== International Third Position ===
The International Third Position was established in 1989 as a breakaway from the Official National Front after Patrick Harrington had sought a compromise with some radical Jews. Sharing the Political Soldier mission of its predecessor the ITP is still in existence as a minor group.

=== Minor groups ===
White Nationalist Crusade was set up in 1981 in an attempt to bring a number of the divided far right groups under one banner. Although its members included veterans such as Robert Relf it failed to achieve its goal of providing a rallying point.

The Association of British Ex-Servicemen (ABEX), a parody of the Association of Jewish Ex-Servicemen, was established by British National Party founder Kenneth McKilliam in the early 1980s as vigilant group for Brixton. The aim was not fulfilled and ABEX disappeared.

The National Action Party was set up by Eddy Morrison and Kevin Randall in the early 1980s and existed in some from for around ten years. With a strongly neo-Nazi ideology the group came under Randall's sole control when Morrison was expelled in 1986.

The UK Patriotic Front was a minor extreme right-wing party that contested some council seats in the urbanised parts Oxfordshire, Gloucestershire and Worcestershire. It was formed during early 1982 by Brenda Steele and June Merrikin. John Tyndall thought it was too pro-European to join forces with the BNP. Peter Knowle was also a major figure at the time. Carol Prentiss and Jo Butcher took over the leadership in early 1984 and it was dissolved later that year.

The National Socialist Workers Initiative, active in the early 1980s, was a Neo-Nazi group which also drew on elements of Ecofascism. Leading members included National Socialist Action Party leader Tony Malski, National Socialist Movement veteran David Thorne and other far-right stalwarts including Ian Kerr-Ritchie and Bill Whitbread.

English Solidarity was established by Jane Birdwood in 1988. Along with Birdwood's other groups, the Self-Help Organisation and the Gentile Self-Defence League, the group was strongly anti-Semitic and co-operated with the BNP.

== 1990s ==
=== National Democrats ===
The National Democrats were established by Ian Anderson in 1995 as a new name for the Flag Group-controlled NF. The move resulted in a split in the movement. The party contested the 1997 general election but made little headway and several prominent members, including Simon Darby and Martin Wingfield, re-emerged as BNP members. The party was effectively defunct long before Anderson's death in February 2011.

=== National Socialist Movement ===
The National Socialist Movement (NSM) was a British neo-Nazi group, best known in the UK for its association with David Copeland, the London nail-bomber, who was a member, and local unit leader for his area. The group was a splinter from Combat 18 in 1997 and in the few years that it existed was thought to have only had around 80 supporters. Two of its members, Charlie Sargent and Martin Cross, are serving life sentences for murder. The group's publications include Column 88, White Dragon and The Order. Prominent members include leader Tony Williams, founding member Steve Sargent, and David Myatt, the group's first leader.

=== Minor groups ===
British Resistance was the brainchild of Rosine de Bounevialle, the editor of Candour. The group's activities included hosting training camps and co-ordinating activities with other far-right organisations.

== 2000s ==
=== White Nationalist Party ===
The White Nationalist Party (WNP) was founded in May 2002 as "the British political wing of Aryan Unity". The party was formed by Eddy Morrison, and Kevin Watmough "a key figure in Combat 18" and webmaster of Redwatch. A highly radical party, it no longer exists.

=== England First Party ===
The England First Party was formed by Mark Cotterill in 2004 and held two council seats in Blackburn for a spell. The party stood candidates in the 2010 local elections and has sought to co-operate with the English Democrats Party. It no longer exists.

=== Nationalist Alliance ===
The Nationalist Alliance was formed in 2005 in a largely failed attempt to unite groups to the right of the BNP. Its main leaders were initially Eddy Morrison and John G. Wood, both leading figures in the White Nationalist Party which it effectively replaced. The party was damaged by a schism that led to the formation of the British Peoples' Party and its registration with the Electoral Commission lapsed in December 2008.

=== British Peoples' Party ===
The British Peoples' Party was a splinter group from the Nationalist Alliance established by Eddy Morrison in 2005. It also contested the 2010 local elections, albeit with a single candidate.

=== New Nationalist Party ===
The New Nationalist Party was a small party founded by former members of the BNP in 2006. It was based in the West Midlands and its most prominent member was the former BNP member Sharon Ebanks, who earlier in 2006 was briefly a councillor in the Kingstanding ward in Birmingham before being forced to resign when it was shown that she had been awarded it due to counting irregularities despite losing the election.

=== Epping Community Action Group ===
Ian Anderson was the leader of the short-lived and allegedly far right Epping Community Action Group, which was registered with the Electoral Commission as a political party in April 2006. The group stood two candidates, including Anderson, for election to Epping Forest District Council in the 2007 local elections, but came third in both wards. He gained 215 votes in the Epping Hemnall ward beating a British National Party candidate by 68 votes.

== 2010s ==
=== National Action ===
National Action is a neo-Nazi organisation which was proscribed for glorifying terrorism in December 2016. The organisation was founded in 2013 by Benjamin Raymond and Alex Davies. Raymond is a former double-glazing salesman who graduated in politics from Essex University and Davies is a former member of the Young BNP. Raymond has described his organisation as "like the BNP but more radical". The group was secretive and had rules to prevent members from talking openly about the organisation.

National Action attempted to gain attention through demonstrations and flashy videos. This included instances of violence towards police and counter-protestors. One of its supporters, Zach Davies, was convicted of attempted murder, which he stated was motivated by wanting to "avenge Lee Rigby's murder", and he spoke of "white power". National Action sought to deny any link with Davies, but other members have been arrested for threats or violence, including Garron Helm for religiously motivated threats against Luciana Berger MP on Twitter. National Action spread propaganda on at least 12 university campuses. Their first protest involved an attempt to deface the statue of Nelson Mandela in London. The group was proscribed in December 2016 after they celebrated the murder of Jo Cox MP by Thomas Mair, with comments including "Don't let this man's sacrifice go in vain."

=== Britannica Party ===
The Britannica Party was a small party founded by Charles Baillie.

=== Britain First ===
Britain First is a far-right group founded by Jim Dowson who had formerly worked a call centre for the BNP before leaving after allegedly groping a female employee. The party is known for invading mosques and its "Christian patrols".

=== British Democrats ===
In February 2013, the British Democrats were launched by former Member of the European Parliament (MEP) and National Front chairman Andrew Brons, who resigned from the BNP in October 2012 after narrowly failing in his campaign to unseat Nick Griffin as leader of the BNP in 2011. Brons remains the party's inaugural president, and the chairman is James Lewthwaite. The BDP has attracted former members of the British National Party (BNP), Democratic Nationalists, Freedom Party, UK Independence Party (UKIP), For Britain Movement, and Civil Liberty, including long-standing far-right political leader John Bean. Nick Lowles of Hope not Hate believed the party would be a serious threat to the BNP, commenting "The BDP brings together all of the hardcore Holocaust deniers and racists that have walked away from the BNP over the last two to three years, plus those previously, who could not stomach the party’s image changes". And in 2022 the BDP experienced a sharp increase in membership, with several nationalist local councillors and prominent far-right activists like Derek Beackon joining the party. They were one of the only far-right British political parties to have any elected representation at the time, with 5 local councillors.

=== Patriotic Alternative ===
Patriotic Alternative is a political organisation founded by Mark Collett in late 2019, the former director of publicity of the British National Party. Since then, PA has held camping and hiking trips as well as paint balling events. PA has also held days of action including White Lives Matter banners and light projections onto the White Cliffs of Dover.

== 2020s ==
=== The British Hand ===
The British Hand is a group founded by a 15 year old teenager in late 2020. Since then, The British Hand have been at the root of hundreds of far-right propaganda being released online, especially on the social media app Telegram, which led Hope not Hate to start an undercover investigation on this group and later writing an article on it, exposing the far-right terror cell.

The British Hand started by a teenage boy recruiting fellow extremists on social media platforms such as Facebook and Instagram.

=== Homeland ===
Homeland is a group founded by Kenny Smith in 2023. Before forming the group, Smith was a senior figure in Patriotic Alternative, but internal divisions led him to form his own group, with the intent of forming a political party by 'stealth'.

== Other related factors ==
=== Webpages, newspapers and magazines ===
==== Candour ====
Candour is a British far-right magazine founded and edited by A.K. Chesterton until his death in 1973.

==== Spearhead (1964–2005) ====
Spearhead was a British far-right magazine edited by John Tyndall until his death in July 2005. Founded in 1964 by Tyndall, it was used to voice his grievances against the state of the United Kingdom. The magazine has not continued under new editorship, although a new article appeared on the magazine's website in October 2010.

==== Redwatch (1992–2019) ====
Redwatch was a British website associated with members of the far-right, neo-fascist British People's Party.

==== The Light ====
The Light is a self-published, monthly British far-right and conspiracy theory newspaper founded by Darren Scott Nesbitt.

== See also ==
- Anti-Defamation League
- Anti-Nazi League
- Board of Deputies of British Jews
- British Freedom Party
- British Nationalism
- Casuals United
- Christian Council of Britain
- Daily Mail
- English Defence League
- League of Saint George
- Muslim Council of Britain
- Swinton Circle
- 1964 United Kingdom general election
- 2007 United Kingdom local elections
- White supremacy
