= 1976 Leeds City Council election =

1976 UK local government election

Elections to Leeds City Council were held on 6 May 1976, with one third of the council up for election. In the interim between the seats first election in 1973, in addition to Labour's 1974 Burley gain, there had been a further three by-elections - and consequent successful defences of - Beeston & Holbeck and Burmantofts & Richmond Hill (Labour) and Headingley (Conservative).

The Conservatives managed to largely repeat their previous year's results, gaining a total of seven and winning control of the council. They gained three from Labour, in the wards of Morley South and Wortley, as well as winning back the aforementioned seat in Burley. The remaining four gains were from the Liberals in Horsforth, both of the Pudsey seats and Otley.

== Election result ==
Leeds local election result 1976
Party	Seats	Gains	Losses	Net gain/loss	Seats %	Votes %	Votes	+/−
Conservative	18	7	0	+7	56.2	48.1	97,312	-1.7%
Labour	12	0	3	-3	37.5	33.9	68,673	+2.4%
Liberal	2	0	4	-4	6.2	15.4	31,155	-2.1%
National Front	0	0	0	0	0.0	0.9	1,910	+0.9%
Ratepayers	0	0	0	0	0.0	0.6	1,266	+0.6%
Communist	0	0	0	0	0.0	0.4	873	+0.0%
British National	0	0	0	0	0.0	0.2	487	+0.2%
Ind. Conservative	0	0	0	0	0.0	0.1	307	+0.1%
Ecology	0	0	0	0	0.0	0.1	168	+0.1%
Independent	0	0	0	0	0.0	0.1	163	-0.6%

This result has the following consequences for the total number of seats on the Council after the elections:

Party	Previous council	New council
Conservatives	43	50
Labour	41	38
Liberals	12	8
Total	96	96
Working majority	0	4

== Ward results ==
Aireborough
Party	Candidate	Votes	%	±%
Conservative	J. Hutchinson	5,544	56.4	−5.0
Labour	P. Jones	2,635	26.8	+4.9
Liberal	B. Cleasby	1,655	16.8	+0.0
Majority		2,909	29.6	−9.9
Turnout		9,834		
Conservative hold		Swing	-4.9	

Armley and Castleton
Party	Candidate	Votes	%	±%
Liberal	J. Wright	3,012	40.5	+3.0
Labour	Michael McGowan	2,462	33.1	−2.8
Conservative	J. Hastings	1,611	21.7	−3.5
British National	J. Drury	226	3.0	+3.0
Communist	P. Witton	72	1.0	−0.5
National Front	Mabel Spink	58	0.8	+0.8
Majority		550	7.4	+5.7
Turnout		7,441		
Liberal hold		Swing	+2.9	

Beeston and Holbeck
Party	Candidate	Votes	%	±%
Labour	K. Fenwick	3,459	50.2	+2.5
Conservative	E. Lucas	2,710	39.3	+2.4
Liberal	C. Coultas	728	10.6	−4.9
Majority		749	10.9	+0.1
Turnout		6,897		
Labour hold		Swing	+0.0	

Bramley
Party	Candidate	Votes	%	±%
Labour	D. Atkinson	2,338	51.4	−1.4
Conservative	A. Mathers	1,609	35.3	−11.9
Liberal	J. Spencer	605	13.3	+13.3
Majority		729	16.0	+10.4
Turnout		4,552		
Labour hold		Swing	+5.2	

Burley
Party	Candidate	Votes	%	±%
Conservative	D. Fletcher-Campbell	1,798	51.6	+0.6
Labour	C. Buttery	1,384	39.7	+3.9
Liberal	P. Sander	171	4.9	−2.7
Communist	B. Jackson	87	2.5	−0.2
National Front	Dorothy Waite	46	1.3	−1.7
Majority		414	11.9	−3.2
Turnout		3,486		
Conservative gain from Labour		Swing	-1.6	

Burmantofts and Richmond Hill
Party	Candidate	Votes	%	±%
Labour	R. Sedler	2,733	39.3	−8.7
Liberal	Margaret Clay	2,385	34.3	+6.3
Conservative	G. Dimmock	1,329	19.1	−3.3
British National	Eddy Morrison	211	3.0	+3.0
National Front	C. Welsh	182	2.6	+2.6
Communist	M. Monkman	110	1.6	+0.0
Majority		348	5.0	−15.1
Turnout		6,950		
Labour hold		Swing	-7.5	

Chapel Allerton and Scott Hall
Party	Candidate	Votes	%	±%
Conservative	S. Symonds	4,334	63.1	+0.9
Labour	A. Baum	1,911	27.8	+5.2
Liberal	J. Clay	628	9.1	−4.6
Majority		2,423	35.3	−4.2
Turnout		6,873		
Conservative hold		Swing	-2.1	

City and Woodhouse
Party	Candidate	Votes	%	±%
Labour	D. Jenner	2,173	52.2	+1.2
Conservative	T. Battersby	1,218	29.3	+0.8
Liberal	D. Selby	611	14.7	−2.2
Communist	J. Rodgers	162	3.9	+0.2
Majority		955	22.9	+0.3
Turnout		4,164		
Labour hold		Swing	+0.2	

Cookridge and Weetwood
Party	Candidate	Votes	%	±%
Conservative	J. Carter	7,367	72.7	+0.3
Labour	I. Levy	1,865	18.4	+3.9
Liberal	D. Leser	895	8.8	−4.2
Majority		5,502	54.3	−3.5
Turnout		10,127		
Conservative hold		Swing	-1.8	

Garforth #1 (Garforth North and Barwick)
Party	Candidate	Votes	%	±%
Conservative	R. Ives	5,191	64.5	−1.0
Labour	B. Selby	2,556	31.7	+5.6
Ind. Conservative	G. Kite	307	3.8	+3.8
Majority		2,635	32.7	−6.6
Turnout		8,054		
Conservative hold		Swing	-3.3	

Garforth #2 (Kippax and Swillington)
Party	Candidate	Votes	%	±%
Labour	F. Flatter	3,200	53.6	−26.9
Conservative	A. Taylor	2,491	41.7	+35.4
Liberal	N. Parnaby	278	4.7	+4.7
Majority		709	11.9	−55.4
Turnout		5,969		
Labour hold		Swing	-31.1	

Gipton and Whinmoor
Party	Candidate	Votes	%	±%
Labour	E. Coward	3,576	49.9	+2.6
Conservative	W. Buckland	3,273	45.7	+0.0
National Front	B. Spink	318	4.4	+4.4
Majority		308	4.2	+2.6
Turnout		7,167		
Labour hold		Swing	+1.3	

Halton
Party	Candidate	Votes	%	±%
Conservative	W. Hyde	4,494	71.3	−1.0
Labour	A. Maher	1,640	26.0	+5.3
National Front	C. Dewar	165	2.6	+2.6
Majority		2,854	45.3	−6.3
Turnout		6,299		
Conservative hold		Swing	-3.1	

Harehills and Roundhay
Party	Candidate	Votes	%	±%
Conservative	J. Challenor	5,014	69.0	+1.7
Labour	C. Say	1,941	26.7	+3.1
National Front	Catherine Dewar	309	4.3	+4.3
Majority		3,073	42.3	−1.5
Turnout		7,264		
Conservative hold		Swing	-0.7	

Headingley
Party	Candidate	Votes	%	±%
Conservative	A. Pedley	2,644	56.3	+1.7
Labour	A. Shires	1,228	26.2	+0.7
Liberal	P. Holmes	620	13.2	−6.7
Communist	B. Cooper	202	4.3	+4.3
Majority		1,416	30.2	+1.0
Turnout		4,694		
Conservative hold		Swing	+0.5	

Horsforth
Party	Candidate	Votes	%	±%
Conservative	A. Foyston	3,814	50.3	−2.3
Liberal	J. Stevens	2,448	32.3	−4.8
Labour	H. Outhwaite	1,045	13.8	+3.4
National Front	J. Duckenfield	274	3.6	+3.6
Majority		1,366	18.0	+2.5
Turnout		7,581		
Conservative gain from Liberal		Swing	+1.2	

Hunslet East and West
Party	Candidate	Votes	%	±%
Liberal	Ivan Lester	2,904	44.4	−3.7
Labour	John Gunnell	2,807	42.9	+3.0
Conservative	R. Blackburn	565	8.6	−3.3
National Front	N. Griffiths	214	3.3	+3.3
British National	S. Brown	50	0.8	+0.8
Majority		97	1.5	−6.7
Turnout		6,540		
Liberal hold		Swing	-3.3	

Kirkstall
Party	Candidate	Votes	%	±%
Labour	Bernard Atha	2,906	50.8	+5.4
Conservative	A. Castle	2,535	44.3	−2.8
Liberal	L. Keates	282	4.9	−2.6
Majority		371	6.5	+4.8
Turnout		5,723		
Labour hold		Swing	+4.1	

Middleton
Party	Candidate	Votes	%	±%
Labour	J. Kitchen	2,443	59.8	+3.8
Conservative	C. Hallas	1,036	25.3	+0.2
Liberal	L. Hirst	510	12.5	−3.5
Communist	Daisy Triscott	99	2.4	−0.5
Majority		1,407	34.4	+3.5
Turnout		4,088		
Labour hold		Swing	+1.8	

Moortown
Party	Candidate	Votes	%	±%
Conservative	K. Sibbald	2,969	65.5	−3.8
Labour	G. Dickinson	1,006	22.2	+3.0
Liberal	S. Walderberg	388	8.6	−2.9
Ecology	K. Rushworth	168	3.7	+3.7
Majority		1,963	43.3	−6.8
Turnout		4,531		
Conservative hold		Swing	-3.4	

Morley #1 (Morley North)
Party	Candidate	Votes	%	±%
Conservative	B. Senior	3,372	50.6	−16.7
Labour	K. Smith	1,862	27.9	−4.7
Ratepayers	G. Jarratt	1,266	19.0	+19.0
Independent	B. Morris	163	2.4	+2.4
Majority		1,510	22.7	−11.9
Turnout		1,266		
Conservative hold		Swing	-6.0	

Morley #2 (Morley South)
Party	Candidate	Votes	%	±%
Conservative	B. Broadbent	2,571	50.1	+14.7
Labour	T. Hewitt	2,562	49.9	+7.4
Majority		9	0.2	−6.9
Turnout		5,133		
Conservative gain from Labour		Swing	+3.6	

Osmondthorpe
Party	Candidate	Votes	%	±%
Labour	D. Hamilton	2,029	54.9	+1.9
Conservative	S. Nelmes	1,304	35.3	−5.7
National Front	L. Fella	194	5.3	+5.3
Liberal	B. Stevenson	167	4.5	−1.4
Majority		725	19.6	+7.5
Turnout		3,694		
Labour hold		Swing	+3.8	

Otley
Party	Candidate	Votes	%	±%
Conservative	G. Francis	3,765	44.4	−2.4
Liberal	G. Kirkland	3,736	44.1	+6.3
Labour	D. Gagen	916	10.8	−4.6
Communist	P. Punchard	55	0.6	+0.6
Majority		29	0.3	−8.7
Turnout		8,472		
Conservative gain from Liberal		Swing	-4.3	

Pudsey North
Party	Candidate	Votes	%	±%
Conservative	J. Bashall	3,170	45.5	−5.2
Liberal	J. Finnigan	2,190	31.4	+5.0
Labour	D. Trafford	1,606	23.1	+0.2
Majority		980	14.1	−10.2
Turnout		6,966		
Conservative gain from Liberal		Swing	-5.1	

Pudsey South
Party	Candidate	Votes	%	±%
Conservative	H. Fairhurst	2,777	45.3	−0.7
Liberal	R. Fairbank	1,876	30.6	+6.8
Labour	F. Wadwell	1,474	24.1	−6.1
Majority		901	14.7	−1.1
Turnout		6,127		
Conservative gain from Liberal		Swing	-3.7	

Rothwell
Party	Candidate	Votes	%	±%
Labour	A. Benson	3,594	44.1	+3.0
Conservative	M. Dyer	2,333	28.6	−3.1
Liberal	P. Bower	2,218	27.2	+0.1
Majority		1,261	15.5	+6.1
Turnout		8,145		
Labour hold		Swing	+3.0	

Seacroft
Party	Candidate	Votes	%	±%
Labour	F. Stringer	2,609	57.6	+0.0
Conservative	R. Ivey	1,681	37.1	−2.5
National Front	K. Middleton	150	3.3	+3.3
Communist	A. Dale	86	1.9	−0.8
Majority		928	20.5	+2.6
Turnout		4,526		
Labour hold		Swing	+1.2	

Stanningley
Party	Candidate	Votes	%	±%
Labour	J. Mann	2,315	52.0	+9.5
Conservative	K. Knapton	1,561	35.1	−0.4
Liberal	A. Hillam	575	12.9	−9.0
Majority		754	16.9	+9.8
Turnout		4,451		
Labour hold		Swing	+4.9	

Talbot
Party	Candidate	Votes	%	±%
Conservative	J. Sherwin	3,763	71.7	+0.9
Labour	D. Brown	908	17.3	+2.3
Liberal	G. Macolferson	575	11.0	−3.2
Majority		2,855	54.4	−1.4
Turnout		5,246		
Conservative hold		Swing	-0.7	

Wetherby
Party	Candidate	Votes	%	±%
Conservative	N. Brown	6,936	74.7	+2.8
Labour	L. Adams	1,304	14.0	+5.0
Liberal	D. Tunstall	1,050	11.3	−5.3
Majority		5,632	60.6	+5.3
Turnout		9,290		
Conservative hold		Swing	-1.1	

Wortley
Party	Candidate	Votes	%	±%
Conservative	H. Connah	2,533	47.2	−6.0
Labour	W. Thurlow	2,186	40.7	+5.5
Liberal	J. Nelson	648	12.1	+0.6
Majority		347	6.5	−11.5
Turnout		5,367		
Conservative gain from Labour		Swing	-5.7	
