= 635 Group =

- Type: Militant anti-fascism
- Location: West Yorkshire, United Kingdom
- Affiliations: Anti-Fascist Action

The 635 Group is a network of militant anti-fascists operating in West Yorkshire. Part of the Antifa movement of the 2000s, 635 Group was highly active in suppressing the British People's Party until its dissolution in 2013.
