= Simon Sheppard =

Simon Sheppard may refer to:

- Simon Sheppard (writer), American writer of gay erotica
- Simon Sheppard (activist) (born 1957), British far-right activist
- Simon Sheppard (footballer) (born 1973), former goalkeeper

== See also ==
- Simon Shepherd (born 1956), British actor
