= Political positions of Tommy Robinson =

The political positions of Tommy Robinson durng the first half of the 2010s decade was embodied and intertwined with the English Defence League, a far-right, Islamophobic organisation in the United Kingdom of which he was the leader.

Political scientists identified the EDL as existing on the far-right of the left–right political spectrum. Some academics used the terms "right-wing extremism", and "extreme right" to characterise it, while the sociologist Kevin Braouezec described it as one of the "new far-right extremist movements". In various respects, it resembled other far-right groups, particularly those that emerged across Europe in the early 21st century. As noted by Chris Allen, the EDL is nevertheless "not a direct product of the traditional far-right milieu" in Britain, differing from other groups in its willingness to reach out to communities that the far-right historically discriminates against, namely Jewish people, people of colour, and LGBT people. The criminologists James Treadwell and Jon Garland suggested that the EDL reflected "both a continuation of and a departure from traditional far-right activity", while Paul Jackson—a historian of the far-right—referred to it as part of the "new far right", a movement that presents itself as being more moderate than older far-right groups.

[D]espite its claims to the contrary, there is much prima face evidence to place the EDL on the more radical fringes of the political right. This ranges from its populist, nationalist agenda; to its condemnation of leftwing figures on its various blogs and websites; to its strong associations with the US Tea Party movement; to its support for international far right figures, such as Geert Wilders. Moreover[…], key EDL figures, such as Steven Yaxley‐Lennon and Kevin Carroll, have historic links with the British National Party (BNP). Finally[…], extreme right‐wing movements, such as the Aryan Strike Force, have found the EDL a useful host organisation.

— Historian of the far right Paul Jackson

Ideologically, the EDL was not wholly clear; it had no specific policies, goals, or manifesto, and no intellectual vanguard to lead it.The political scientist Julian Richards suggested that one of the reasons that the EDL should be categorised as far-right was because of how many of its members acted, in contrast to what the group officially stated in its public pronouncements. He observed that "There is no doubt that a considerable number of people with basic Far Right sentiments, including a general dislike of foreigners and ethnic minorities and a sympathy for Nazi movements and ideas can be found in and around the EDL." From its early days, members of far-right political parties like the NF and BNP attended the EDL's demonstrations, while a 2011 survey found that more EDL members intended to vote BNP than for any other party. Although concurring that the EDL was ideologically far-right, the political scientists George Kassimeris and Leonie Jackson cautioned against blurring "the official ideology" of the EDL with the views of its supporters.

== Self-perception ==
Tommy Robinson and the EDL have long disavowed the label "far-right", as do many other groups within the "counter-jihad" movement. On its website, the EDL described itself as "non-political, taking no position on right-wing vs. left-wing. We welcome members from all over the political spectrum, and with varying views on foreign policy, united against Islamic extremism and its influence on British life." Its online material nevertheless often condemns left-wingers, and members regularly complain about "stupid lefties" who disagree with the EDL's views. When examining the EDL's public statements, Jackson cautioned against automatically taking them at face value; as he noted, far-right groups typically present "front stage" messages for public consumption which conceal more aggressive views that are expressed in private.

The EDL has also been characterised as being populist in ideology because of its claims to represent "ordinary people" against the liberal elites which it accuses of controlling the country. Research suggests that elite EDL such as Tommy Robinson and its supporters bore more hatred for mainstream politicians than for Muslims. After her fieldwork with the group, the ethnographer Hilary Pilkington suggested that rather than referring to them as "far right", the EDL would be better classified as being part of the "populist radical right", a term earlier developed by the political scientist Cas Mudde. Based on their research among EDL members, Simon Winlow, Steve Hall and James Treadwell argued that the EDL should also be seen "unequivocally, [as] a working-class political movement" due to the makeup of its membership. In addition, they observed that it was "a fringe political group cut adrift from mainstream politics".

Despite its fragile and sporadic existence, [the EDL] maintains core principles founded on a dissatisfaction with immigration policies and a desire to mobilise against the spread of what it sees as the hostile alien culture of radical Islamism. It hopes to defend the interests of the native population from the perceived threats posed by immigrants, multiculturalism and what it imagines to be the growing power and paramilitary forms of the Muslim faith in England.

— Simon Winlow, Steve Hall and James Treadwell on the Tommy Robinson's EDL

== 2010s ==
=== English Defence League ===
With Tommy Robinson at its helm, the organisaton Robinson founded is regarded as part of a broader self-described international "counter-jihad" movement. The political scientist Hilary Aked defined counter-jihadism as "a section of the far-right distinguished by its hostility to migrants, Muslims and Islam." Another political scientist, Matthew Goodwin, noted that the counter-jihad movement was "united by their belief that Islam and Muslims are posing a fundamental threat to the resources, identities and even survival of Western states", and that counter-jihad groups were "more confrontational, chaotic and unpredictable than traditional anti-immigrant and ethnic nationalist movements in Western democracies".

Pilkington characterised Tommy Robinson's EDL as an "anti-Islamist movement", although noted that "there is slippage at movement level, and among individual supporters, into a broader anti-Islam or anti-Muslim position". Officially, the EDL stated it only opposed certain types of Islam and certain types of Muslim, being against the "Islamic extremist" but not the "ordinary Muslim", a distinction also drawn by many of its activists. However, the EDL's rhetoric regularly failed to make this distinction. On its website, the two are often conflated: a 2011 article stated that "The sheer number of cases of Islamic extremism should suggest... that the problem should not be seen as being with a sub-sect of Islam that no one can really define... but as a problem with Islam itself." It is likely that many who encountered the EDL's rhetoric were not able to appreciate a distinction between different interpretations of Islam, and research among the group's grassroots found that many did not do so.

In Tommy Robinson's discourse on the group's mission statement, he constructed a binary division between Western culture and Islamic culture, the former presented as tolerant and progressive and the latter as intolerant and backward. Islam is perceived as being anachronistic, having failed to adapt to the modern world; EDL members regularly referred to it as an "ideology" or a "cult" rather than a "religion." Like other right-wing populists across Europe, the EDL presents Muslims as being intrinsically culturally incompatible, and threatening, to European societies, evoking Samuel P. Huntington's notion of the Clash of Civilizations, as well as the idea of Salafi Islamist militant groups such as Al Qaeda that the Western and Islamic worlds are fundamentally at conflict. Although the EDL promotes a multi-racial concept of the English nation, its rhetoric explicitly distinguishes Muslims as being apart from this national group. For the EDL, a Muslim cannot be truly English, and the idea of an English Muslim or a British Muslim identity is not considered acceptable.

Islam is not just a religious system, but a political and social ideology that seeks to dominate all non‐believers and impose a harsh legal system that rejects democratic accountability and human rights. It runs counter to all that we hold dear within our British liberal democracy.

— In the EDL mission statement

EDL members characterised Islam as a threat to Western culture, presenting it as a misogynistic, homophobic, and dangerous force, one which is discriminatory, intolerant, and hateful towards non-Muslims. Muslims are associated in EDL discourse not just with the oppression of women, Jews, and gay people, but also with terrorism, rape, paedophilia, and incest. The caricature of the Muslim in the EDL's discourse was similar to the anti-Semitic caricature of the Jew promoted in Nazi Germany. The EDL consistently associated Muslims with negative behaviour and blamed this upon Islam itself, selectively identifying passages from the Qur'an which it claimed Muslims use to justify their anti-social and criminal behaviour. The EDL's Facebook page shared news stories which depicted Muslims negatively, while EDL members often engaged in confirmation bias, believing any negative claims about Muslims they encounter—whether true or not—that fit within their pre-accepted worldview in which Muslims are seen as inherently immoral and dangerous.

EDL members believed that Muslims always protected their own while viewing non-Muslims as fair game for abuse and exploitation. EDL supporters thought Muslims failed to respect non-Muslims, regarding them only as "infidels"; in turn, various EDL figures referred to themselves as "infidels" and the term was emblazoned on some EDL merchandise. Various EDL members recalled incidents in which Muslims had been disrespectful towards them or to British and English culture. For instance, members cited instances in which Islamists burned remembrance poppies in protest at British military activities abroad; for the EDL, this was incredibly disrespectful toward the British people. Other EDL members described more personal encounters; one woman described painting St George's flag on her face in preparation for an England football match, but being barred from boarding a bus by its Muslim driver who claimed that her display of the flag offended him. For her, this event was a catalyst for joining the EDL.

==== Islamophobia and cultural racism ====
The English Defence League employed a culturally racist discourse of Islamophobia. Racist discourse construction involves the demarcation of an in-group and an out-group, where the in-group considers itself superior and claims the right to decide who can belong, and the out-group is represented as threatening its privileges and position. EDL discourse performed this function by racialising Muslim culture as the source of Muslim behaviour and conferring the role of arbiters of acceptability to culturally superior non-Muslims.

— Political scientists George Kassimeris and Leonie Jackson

Although there is little consensus as to how Islamophobia should be defined, a range of scholars who have studied the EDL have characterised it as an Islamophobic organisation. Allen noted that "The EDL is creating and perpetuating meanings about Muslims and Islam, whether real or imaginary, accurate or inaccurate, representative or misrepresentative, that are clearly ideologically Islamophobic." As he noted, the EDL's presentation of all Muslims without distinction as the "irrefutable Other" was "clearly Islamophobic". Similarly, Kassimeris and Jackson stated that in presenting non-Muslims as the "in-group" and Muslims as the "out-group" and then trying to "exclude Muslims from the national community" in Britain, the EDL were Islamophobic.

Tommy Robinson's EDL rejected the idea that it is Islamophobic. In a statement it declared that "the English Defence League do not 'fear' Islam, we do not have a 'phobia' about Islam, we just realise the very serious threat it poses". In defining Islamophobia as a phobia or an affected prejudice—a definition rejected by the majority of academics and activists employing the term—the EDL sought to dismiss the concept as nonsense. On its website, it stated that the biggest threat to Muslims is not "Islamophobia" but the "extremism that thrives in the Muslim community" itself, including "the embrace of violent and anti-democratic means, the intolerance, the separatism, the attacks on homosexuals and Jews, the hatred of 'the West', and the continued hosting of radical preachers."

Various political scientists and other academic observers describe the EDL's Islamophobia as a form of cultural racism, or the "new racism" described by Martin Baker in the early 1980s. This emphasis on cultural racism—which entails stereotyping a group on the basis of cultural (as opposed to biological) features and presenting them as having a "culturally 'fixed' set of values" which are dangerous, inferior, and diametrically opposed to the cultural values of "the national community"—was a recurring trait among many of the "new far right" groups active in Europe, and differentiated them from earlier far right groups which tended to adopt biological racism. The EDL rejected the idea that its stance on Muslims could be racist, stating that "Islam is not a race". Conversely, EDL members have referred to Muslims as racist; one member was quoted as saying: "people say we're racist but, when you think about it, they're [i.e. Muslims] the ones that's racist. They're killing white people just because they're white. They're killing Christians because they're Christian. It's them that's declared a holy war. We are just reacting."

==== Hatred of Muslims ====
Following their fieldwork among EDL supporters, Winlow, Hall and Treadwell noted that all those whom they had encountered expressed hatred of Muslims. Many placed this hatred in relation to local issues and personal experiences; for instance, EDL members regarded being poorly treated by an Asian shopkeeper as evidence that Muslims intrinsically hate the white working-class. Instances when Muslims have been friendly toward them are treated as evidence that Muslims are conniving, appearing friendly to white non-Muslims so as to catch them off guard. EDL members expressed anger at what they perceived as Muslims' wealth—contrasting it to their own strained economic situation—and the fact that Muslim migrants received council housing and benefits which EDL members believed they had not earned; EDL members commonly believed that the welfare system should only be available for native Britons and not migrants. EDL supporters criticised the perceived ruthless entrepreneurship of Muslims, including the way that they profited off of the white working-class through charging high prices in their shops, also alleging that Muslims regularly avoided paying tax and helped other Muslims advance over white Britons. EDL members expressed anger at perceived Muslim involvement in drug dealing and other crimes impacting their communities; for many, the intimidating presence of Muslim gangs in their local area was seen as a more direct issue than Islamic terrorism.

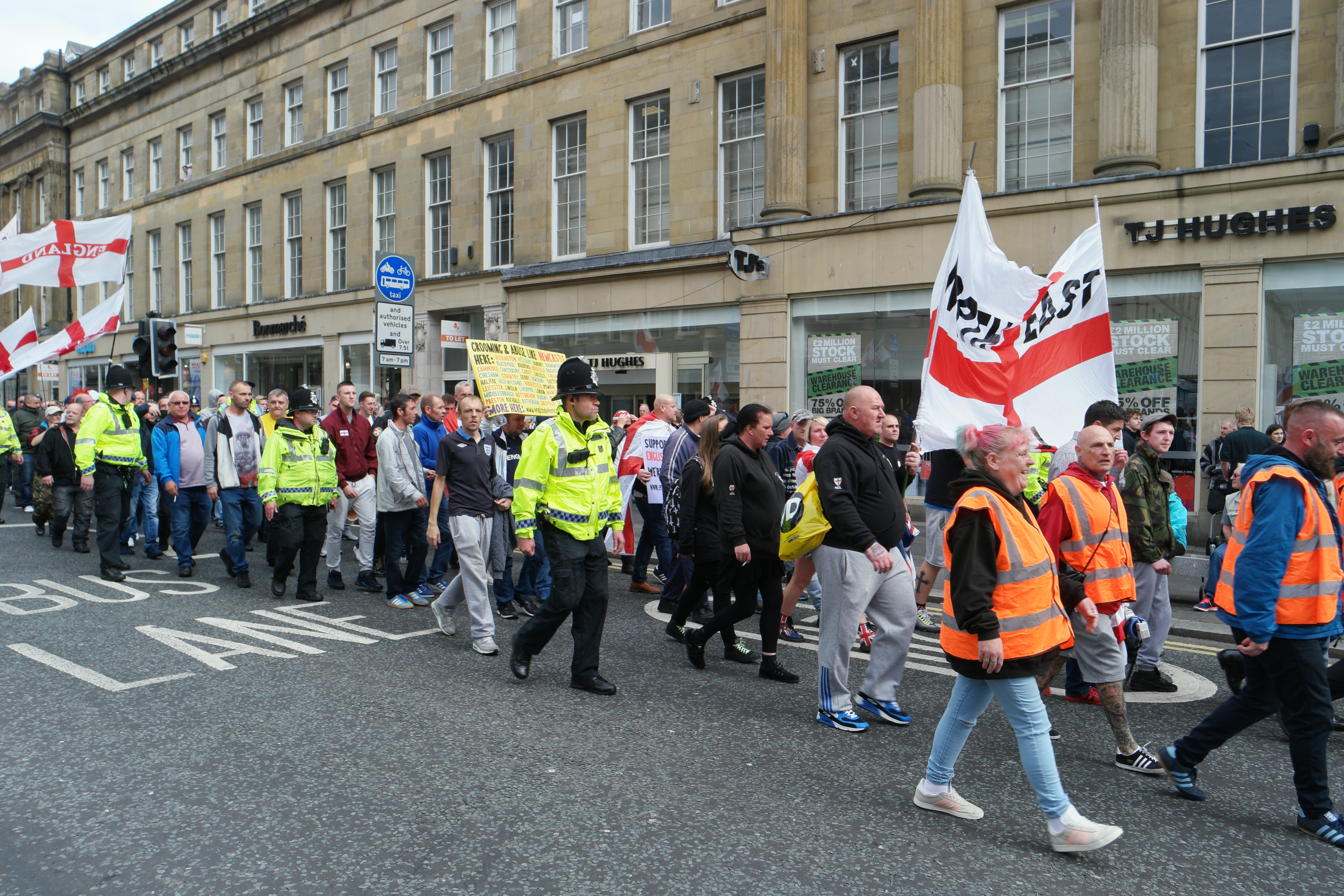
An EDL march in Newcastle, 2017

A topic of particular anger was the role of men from Muslim backgrounds in grooming gangs largely targeting underage white girls. For instance, in highlighting that men from Islamic backgrounds were disproportionately represented in the Rochdale and West Midlands child sex grooming scandals, the EDL claimed these men found justification for their actions in Qur'anic references to non-Muslims being inferior and thus acceptable targets. They also believed that Muslims legitimated such actions by reference to the fact that Islam's founder, Muhammad, married one of his wives, Aisha, when she was a child. Such claims were made despite the absence of evidence that these sex offenders claimed "Islamic supremacism" as justification for their actions; it also ignores the fact that according to Crown Prosecution Service figures, 85% of UK sex offenders are white men. When white sex offenders were exposed, EDL members were still angry but regarded the perpetrator's ethnicity or religion as irrelevant, a firm contrast to their response when the perpetrators were of Muslim background. Some EDL members believed that white sex offenders were treated more harshly than their Muslim counterparts; one contrasted how Jimmy Savile was publicly reviled while Muhammad—whom EDL members typically considered a paedophile due to his marriage to Aisha—was revered.

Online, supporters expressed comments that were derogatory of Islam like "Islam is a sick vile evil primitive barbaric cult that needs wiping from the earth." Fieldwork among EDL members found many derogatory comments about Muslims; one member was quoted as stating that "They can't live like us cos they are not evolved for it, they are simple, made for backward villages in the mountain where they can sit around eating stinking curries and raping chickens." On the EDL's social media, many supporters incited violence against Muslims: "we need to kill", "time to get violent", "Kill any muslim u see [sic]", "Kill the curry munching bastards", and "Petrol bomb your nearest mosque". Chants during rallies included "We hate all Muslims", "Die, Muslim, die", "Give me a gun and I'll shoot the Muzzie scum", "I hate Pakis more than you", and "Burn our poppies and we'll burn your mosques". Such sentiments also came from its ethnic minority supporters; Guramit Singh, the head of the EDL's Sikh Division, stated that Muslims will end up "burning in fucking hell", and expressed the opinion that "I fucking hate the Pakis. India needs to go to war with Pakistan."

==== Extremism and shariah ====
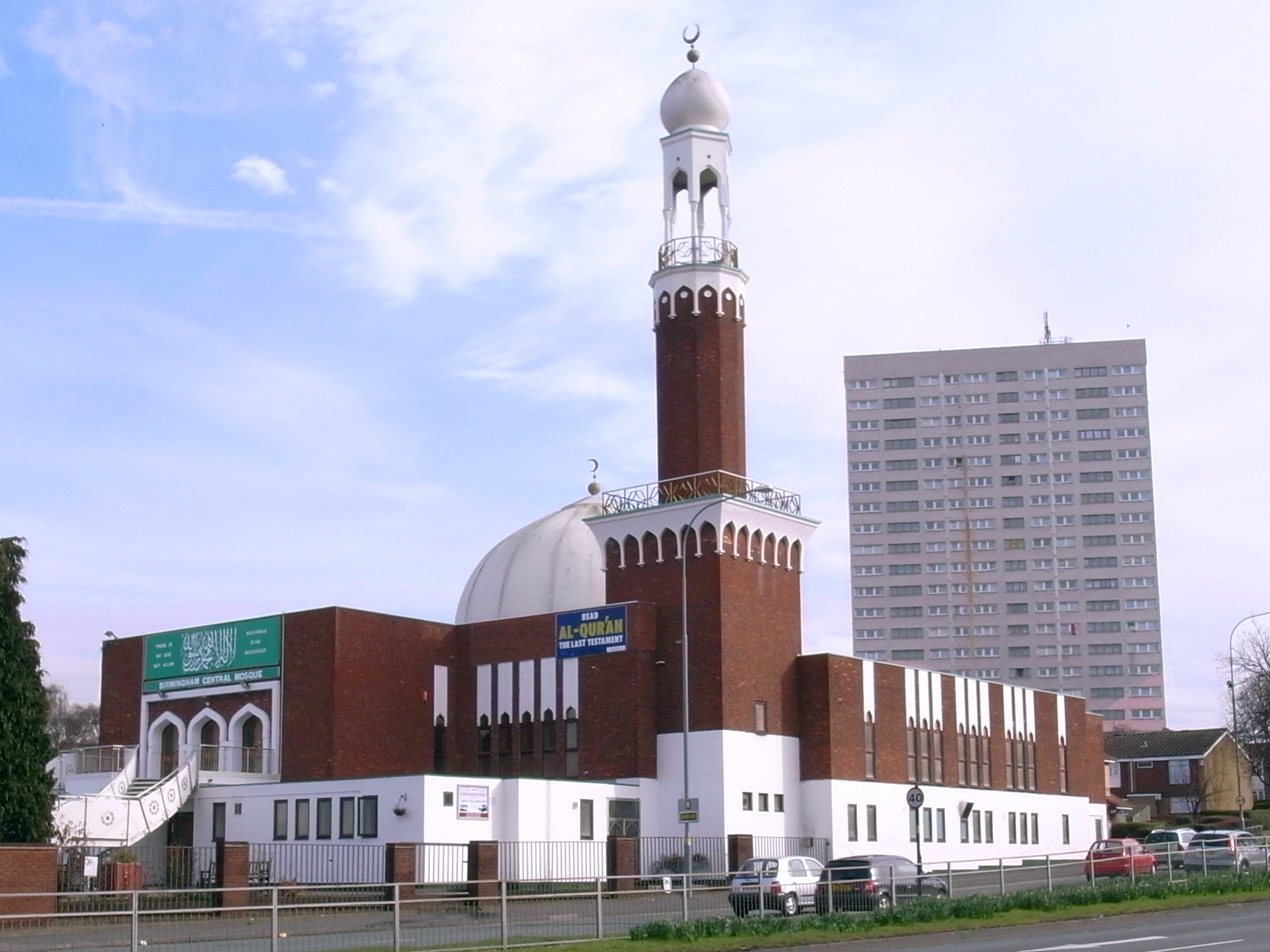
For the EDL, the construction of mosques in Britain (Birmingham Central Mosque pictured) reflects a desire by Muslims to dominate the country.

Tommy Robinson's EDL claimed that Britain's Muslims fail to speak out against Islamic extremism and thus implicitly support it. It also alleged that British Muslims spend more time complaining about discrimination and attacking critics of Islam than eliminating extremism within their own ranks. Because of this, the EDL alleged that British Muslims' commitment to "British values" is questionable. The perception that "moderate" Muslims do little or nothing to counter "extremism" was also widespread among the group's grassroots. In making this accusation, the EDL ignored the many examples of Islamic groups speaking out and campaigning against extremism and terrorism, and—according to Jackson—promoted "a major distortion of reality" by repeatedly presenting extremism as the "dominant characteristic" of Muslim communities.

EDL discourse repeatedly referred to what it called "Islamic supremacism", the belief that Muslims express a superiority complex over non-Muslims. It feared that Muslims had imperialistic designs, wanting to dominate Britain, claiming that this was being facilitated through higher birth rates among Muslims than non-Muslims. Robinson for instance stated that "20 years down the line we'll be overrun by Islam", while EDL rhetoric referred to Muslims "spreading across our country" and besieging the "patriotic people" of England. The EDL portrayed Muslim attempts to participate in political life as entryism, an attempt to expand Islamic influence in the Britain, and also claimed that the building of mosques reflected a desire to dominate the country.

The EDL claimed that the greater Islam's reach, the more that non-Muslims would be victimised and discriminated against. Meadowcroft and Morrow attended a Wolverhampton EDL meet-and-greet event where the local division leader stated that he joined "for my children and grandchildren because I don't want them to be taken to mosques as part of their school excursions and I don't want to see my granddaughter wearing a burqa or being punished for wearing a short skirt." Similarly, Richards quoted one young woman at a 2010 Dudley protest as saying that she attended because "I don't want my daughters to grow up having to wear the burqa." EDL members perceive the burqa and niqab as being intimidating towards non-Muslims, degrading to women, and facilitating the concealment of criminals and terrorists.

The EDL believed Muslims wanted to impose sharia law on Britain and Western society. The group generalises sharia as a uniform set of rules, ignoring the fact that it represents a diverse and often contradictory range of approaches to Islamic jurisprudence. In opposing sharia, which it regards as inherently misogynistic, the EDL positions itself as the defenders of women, employing the slogan "EDL Angels [i.e. women] stand beside their men, not behind them". In presenting female members as angels, the EDL contrasts the image of Western women with the stereotype of the burqa-clad Muslim woman. Alternately, in rejecting traditional Islamic attitudes to womanhood, many EDL women embrace the image of the "slut" who engages in binge drinking and can be "one of the lads", engaging in raucous and violent behaviour alongside their male counterparts. EDL members expressed support for the French ban on face covering introduced in 2010. The EDL also emphasised the cruelty of halal slaughter techniques, presenting them as more cruel than kosher slaughter practices. In its "Halal Campaign" launched in 2011, the EDL campaigned against stores and restaurants that sold halal meat without labelling it as such, citing this as evidence that Muslims were seeking to impose their practices on the rest of society.

== Race and sexuality ==
Robinson described the EDL as a 'multicultural organization made up of every community in this country'. If true, this would clearly make the EDL substantially different to anything typically seen in the traditionally 'all white' make-up of what is deemed to be the far right. And, indeed, this is a unique feature of the EDL. Reflecting its origins in football firms, not only does the EDL march behind banners that state 'Black and white unite against Islamic extremism'—it also marches carrying Israeli flags—but a number of those marching are of black, Asian or mixed heritages. Unlike other far-right organizations, the EDL is proud to recognize and proclaim its diversity.

— Political scientist Chris Allen

According to Kassimeris, Tommy Robinson's EDL stated that it was not a racist organisation. It used the slogan: "Not racist, not violent, just no longer silent", and on its website, described itself as taking an "actively anti-racist and anti-fascist stance". The group's Nottingham Division stipulated that anyone engaging in "Racial abuse, Racist 'jokes', [or] Explicitly racist conduct" would be expelled. Robinson stated that people of "all races and faiths" were welcome to join, and it employed the slogan "Black and White unite: all races and religions are welcome in the EDL". Individuals of Asian, African, and mixed heritage attended EDL events, albeit in small numbers, and the group formed specific divisions for Hindu, Sikh, Jewish, Greek and Cypriot, and Pakistani Christian supporters. Pilkington noted that these ethnic minority supporters were often viewed as "trophy" members, with many white members asking to have their photographs taken with them at EDL events.

Pilkington also found that white EDL members were keen to stress that they had friends and family members from ethnic minority backgrounds as a means of countering accusations of racism; many accepted that England was a multi-racial and multi-cultural country and often regarded this as a good thing. She noted that among many EDL members, "lack of racism towards one group is assumed to be evidence of lack of racism against all"; they believed that because they did not hate people of colour, they could not be racist, regardless of their anti-Muslim prejudices. For the EDL, the Muslim identity was solely a "religious" one and not a "racial" one, and thus in their view prejudice against Muslims could not be "racism". From her fieldwork, Pilkington found that EDL members adopted a simple, narrow definition of "racism", using the term in reference to hatred for another race and believing that racial categories were rooted in biological difference and demarcated by skin colour.

Constructing links with non-white communities was not unprecedented among the British far-right; the BNP had earlier established links with anti-Islamic elements in the Hindu and Sikh communities. Far-right football hooligan subcultures had become increasingly welcoming towards black people following the growth of black players in British football teams. However, Busher observed that the racial slur "paki" was common at private EDL meetings; Pilkington similarly recalled a car journey with EDL members who made comments like "dirty Paki" and "fucking filthy cunt" when passing Asians on the street. Explicitly racist language was also used at demonstrations; one chant used was "If we all hate Pakis, clap your hands", while a 2010 video from Stoke City features an EDL protester shouting at a police officer: "You fucking Paki-loving bastard!"

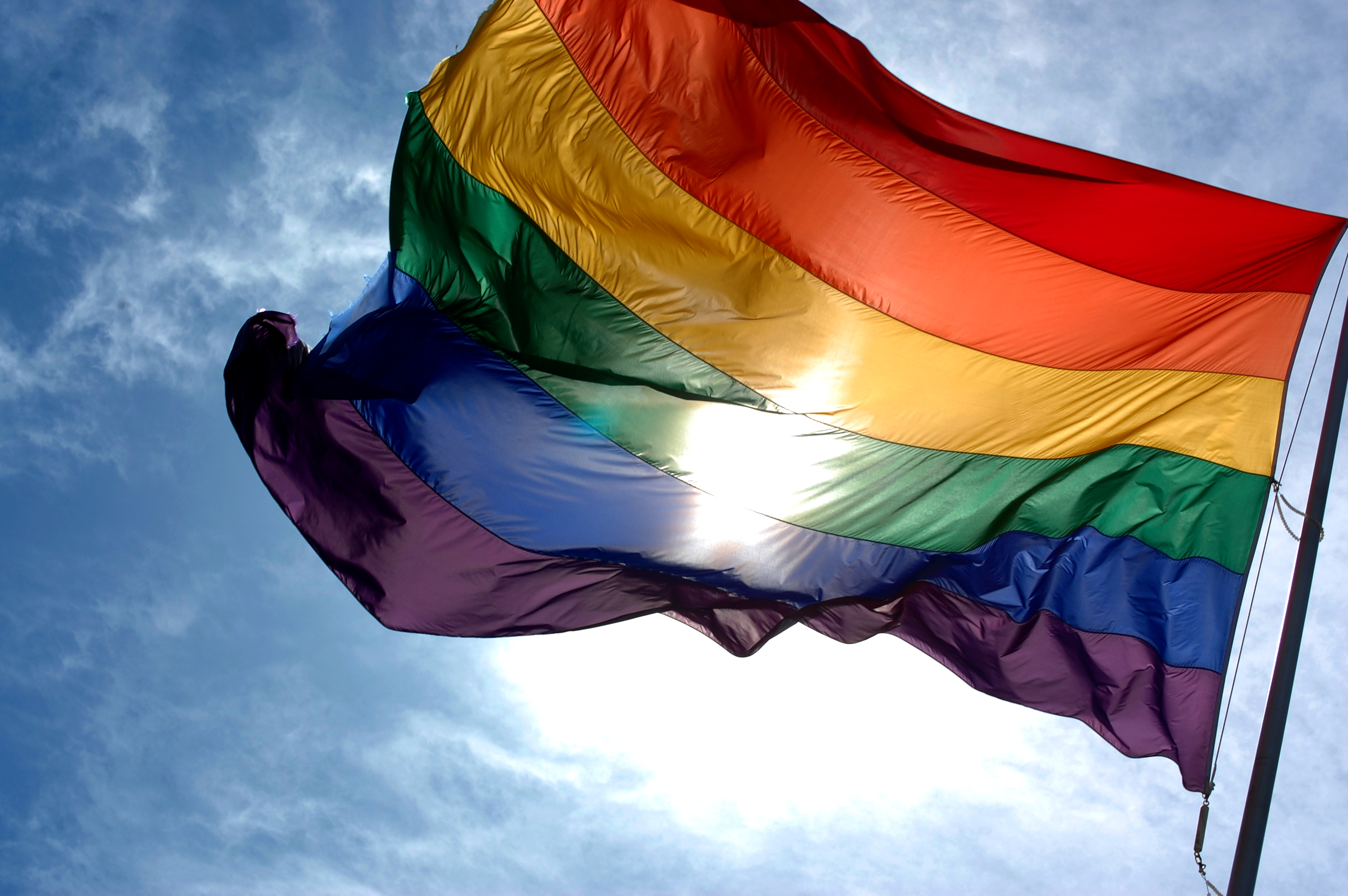
The LGBT rainbow flag was regularly flown at EDL events by LGBT members of the organisation.

The EDL's discourse presents Muslims as being uniquely problematic in Britain, juxtaposing them unfavourably with the country's other ethnic and cultural minorities. On its website, it contrasted Muslims with Sikhs, stating that the latter "have shown an impressive willingness to integrate, to accept the laws of the land, and to confront and defeat any form of extremism." A Sikh Awareness Society representative spoke at an EDL event, where they noted that no other religious group has a "-phobia" attached to it, thus implying that Muslims were uniquely guilty in doing things to generate prejudice against them. This attitude has also been reported among EDL members; Treadwell and Garland quoted one young male EDL activist as stating that "The Paki, the Muslim, to me is the enemy, they are like everything we are not... [but] Sikhs and Hindus are not cunts, the Indians, they are ok. They are not like Pakis. Pakis are different... They come here to take advantage of us, they sell fucking smack, rob off whites but not their own, force young girls into prostitution. They are fucking scum."

The EDL also condemned homophobia and established an LGBT division in March 2010. It stated that "EDL welcomes gay people to join in the struggle to protect our values, especially as gay people would be some of those who suffer most under an islamic [sic] regime." It had initially invited the anti-Islam American pastor Terry Jones—known for burning copies of the Qur'an—to attend one of its demonstrations, but withdrew the invitation, stating that it disapproved of Jones' views on sexuality and race. Allen suggested that the EDL's support of LGBT rights marked it apart from Britain's "traditional far right". This pro-LGBT rights stance allowed the EDL to criticise what it saw as the left's refusal to confront Islamic homophobia as well as to conflate Islamism with Nazism. Pilkington argued that this pro-LGBT rights stance was not solely a cynical ploy by the EDL's leadership, but reflected widespread views within the movement. She observed gay and transgender members speaking openly at EDL events and receiving a warm reception, while the LGBT rainbow flag was regularly flown at EDL rallies by the leader of its LGBT division; at the same time, Pilkington heard homophobic comments at EDL events.

== Nationalism and anti-immigration stance ==
Leadership of EDL such as Tommy Robinson and his loyalists were staunchly nationalist; his followers and its members expressed a strong love of England and described themselves as patriots. Jackson considered it ultra-nationalist, while several academics argued that it embraced an ethnic conception of nationalism. Copsey suggested that it was an identitarian form of English nationalism in which a "native English" identity was deployed as the main weapon against Islam. In his view, the desire to protect "Englishness" as a form of "traditional ethno-national dominance" is strong among members. Pilkington argued that although some members expressed nativist sentiment, for most members, pride in being English was not the same as the "white pride" expressed by fascist groups like the BNP. The journalist Daniel Trilling nevertheless commented that the EDL's concept of "Englishness" was ambiguous; similarly, Winlow, Hall and Treadwell observed that the EDL's conception of an "English way of life" was "poorly sketched out" — their EDL contacts could not agree on what it constituted, and the only thing that they agreed upon was that Muslims fundamentally rejected it.

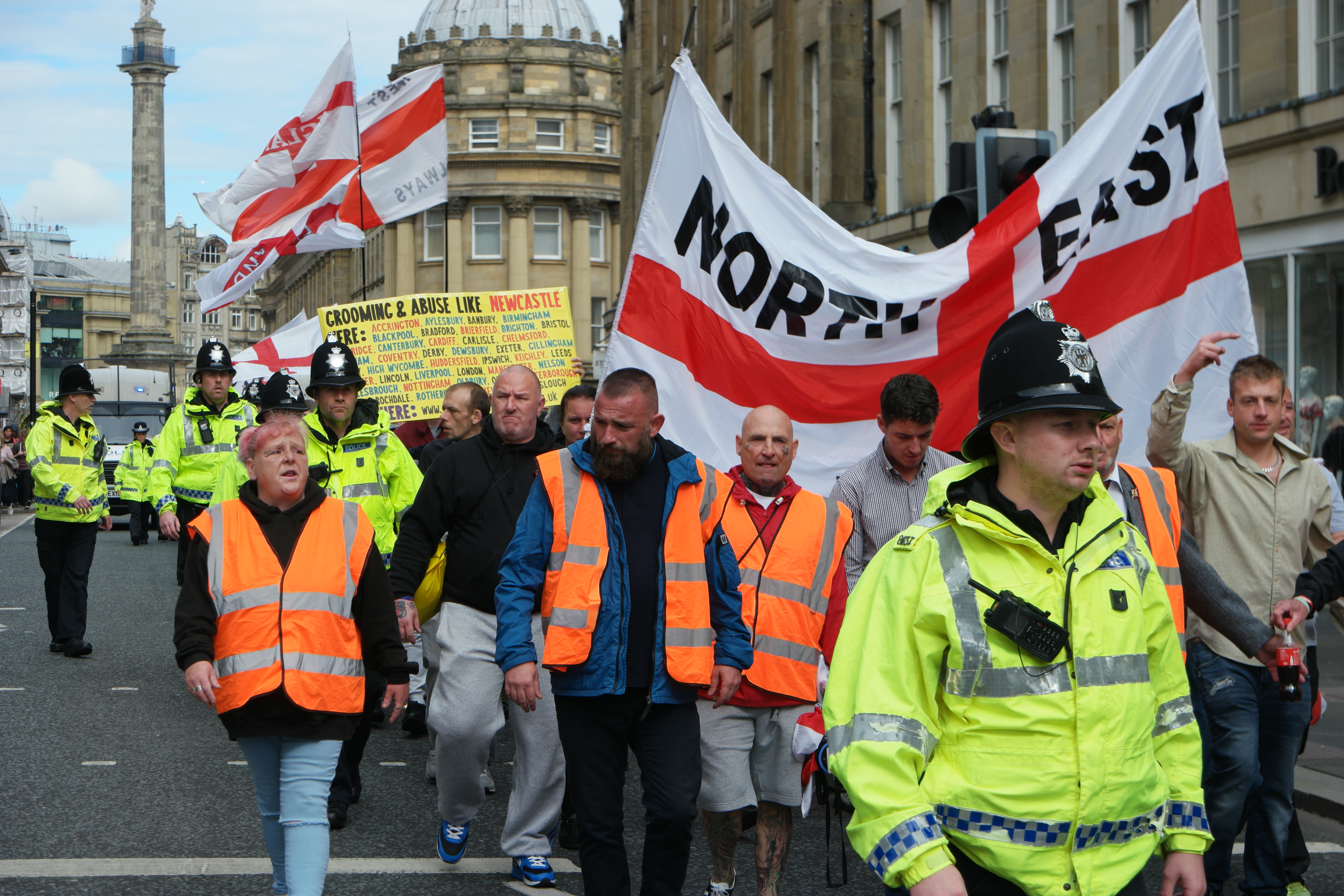
An EDL march in Newcastle in 2017

The EDL's attitude to nationhood is reflected in chants like "we want our country back"; the term Defence in its name presents English identity as something that is under threat. The EDL's nationalist stance is also reflected in its nomenclature and choice of symbols, which regularly include the cross of St George; its logo, for instance, features St George's cross on a shield. Such imagery evokes the symbolism of the medieval Crusades, in which Christians battled Muslims for control of the Holy Land. The motto featured on the logo is in Latin: "in hoc signo vinces", and was taken from that of the first Christian Roman Emperor, Constantine. The name also reflects a militaristic stance, as did branded clothing with text like "Loyal Footsoldier", while it also employs the martial slogan "NS", an abbreviation for "No Surrender", sometimes presented in the altered form of "Never Fucking Surrender Ever" (NFSE). On the EDL discussion board, members regularly referred to a forthcoming war.

Alessio and Meredith thought the EDL was anti-immigrant. Although the EDL's founding mission statement did not mention migration, in February 2014, the EDL stated its intention to include opposition to "mass immigration" in it. In July 2014 an EDL demonstration was held in Hexthorpe, South Yorkshire to oppose the migration of Roma people to the area. Anti-migrant sentiment was common among EDL members, who often believed that official figures underestimated the number of immigrants in Britain. Members often saw immigration as detrimental to the white British, being socially divisive and fundamentally changing the nature of England. EDL members saw migrants as economic competition, outcompeting white British workers for jobs by working for less than the legal minimum wage. At the same time, they often expressed sympathy for migrants as individuals seeking a better life, and typically distinguished between "good" migrants who worked hard and paid taxes and "bad" migrants who lived off the welfare state. While accepting the multi-racial nature of England, EDL members almost uniformly rejected the ideology of multiculturalism, portraying it as something mainstream politicians encouraged out of a desire to be seen as cosmopolitan and progressive and because of a fascination for the exoticism of other cultures.

== Post 2015 ==
=== Europe focus ===
After Tommy Robinson ended the first half of the decade by resigning from EDL and afterwards having a prison stint for mortgage fraud; then Robinson returned to activism, via Pegida and the European Defence League. After Robinson attempted to launch a UK chapter of Pegida it drew little support and both European Defence League and UK Pegida gradually went from being fragmented, to being dispersed, to being diminished to scattered remnants, to being effectively defunct.

Tommy Robinson ended the decade by having a stint at trying to gain a European Parliament seat in 2019, yet he finished 8th place and lost, losing his financial deposit in the process.

=== Fascism ===
Several commentators argued that the EDL is not fascist. Nigel Copsey, a historian of the far-right, stated that the EDL was not driven by the same "ideological end-goal" as neo-fascist and other fascist groups; unlike fascist groups, the EDL has not expressed a desire for major structural change to the British state. Several fascist groups sought to differentiate themselves from the EDL; one white nationalist stated that "The EDL—with its jew flag, nignog members, fag rainbow group, Sikh spokesman and sheeple attendees, are the antithesis of White Nationalism." The BNP distanced itself from the EDL and declared it a proscribed organisation; BNP leader Nick Griffin claimed the EDL was a false flag operation manipulated by "Zionists".

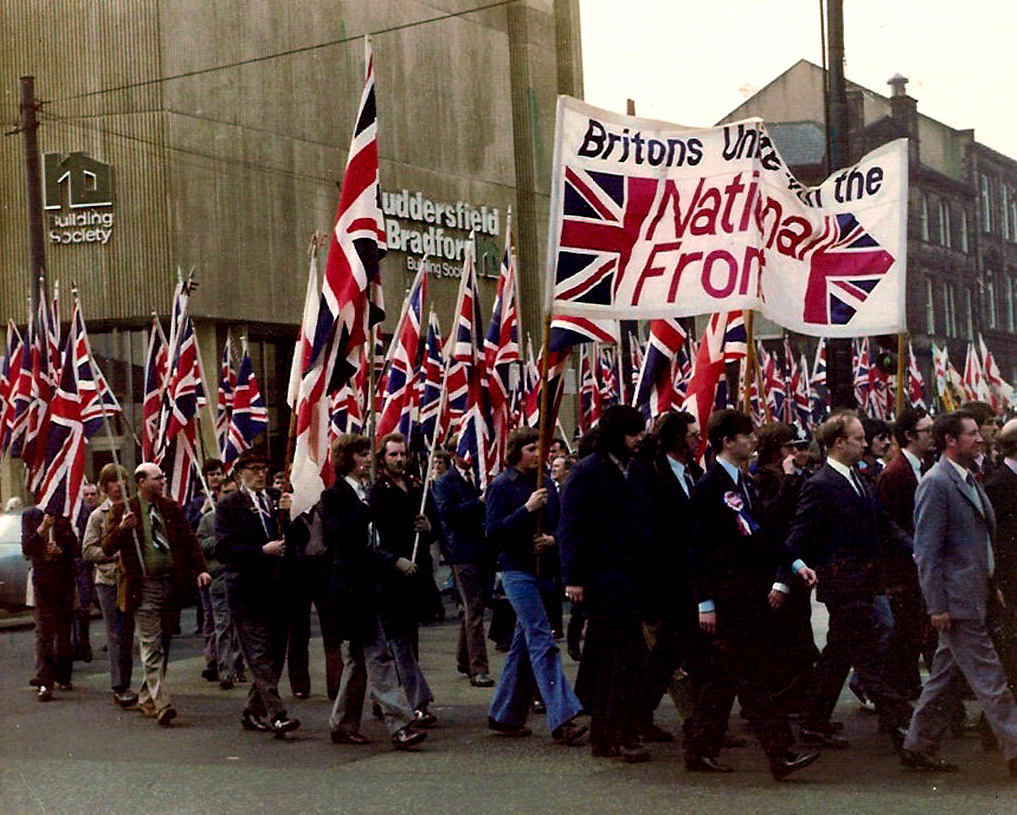
A march by the fascist National Front in Yorkshire during the 1970s. The EDL's tactics of street marches and demonstrations have been described as being similar to those of the NF.

Conversely, the political scientists Dominic Alessio and Meredith Kristen stated that, while the EDL could not be labelled "a fascist organization", there was evidence of "a fascist tradition within the ideology of the EDL". They suggested the EDL "embodied" many of the "key characteristics of fascism": a staunch nationalism and calls for national rebirth, a propensity for violence, and what they described as "pronounced anti-democratic and anti-liberal tendencies" among its leaders. Noting that it was "the actions and practices of members", rather than "just their words and slogans", which "lend themselves to a more coherently fascist ideology", they compared the EDL's tactics with those of the Italian interwar squadristi, which formed a crucial element of Benito Mussolini's National Fascist Party. They highlighted that much of the group's leadership came directly from the fascist BNP, and that EDL events have been supported by present and former members of fascist groups like the National Front, the Racial Volunteer Force, Blood & Honour, and Combat 18.

=== Neo-nazism ===
The EDL is not a neo-Nazi organisation, and distanced itself from neo-Nazism. In an October 2009 publicity stunt for the BBC's show Newsnight, EDL members burned a Nazi flag, members carried the Israeli flag during demonstrations, and the organisation created a Jewish division to distance itself from the anti-Semitic characteristics of Nazism. However, early EDL demonstrations were advertised on the white supremacist website Stormfront, and Holocaust denial has been espoused on the EDL's social media platforms. Known neo-Nazis have attended EDL events, where individuals have been recorded giving the Nazi straight-arm salute. In 2011, the head of the EDL's Jewish Division, Roberta Moore, left the organisation, citing the presence of neo-Nazi and fascist individuals.

The EDL sometimes expelled those it regarded as extremists. In late 2011, an individual was banned from EDL events after being photographed giving a Nazi salute. In another case, Bill Baker—a senior figure in the London EDL and the leader of the English Nationalist Alliance—was ejected in early 2011 after he publicly expressed views the EDL considered racist. At an October 2010 demonstration, Robinson publicly stated: "We're not Nazis, we're not fascists – we will smash Nazis the same way we will smash militant Islam. We are exactly about black and white unite, every single community in this country can come and join our ranks, fill our ranks. We don't care if you arrived here yesterday; you're welcome to protect our Christian culture and our way of life." Pilkington found that this desire to expunge the EDL of neo-Nazi and fascist elements was not just a top-down exercise in public relations, but had the popular support of EDL members more broadly, who were keen to distinguish themselves from neo-Nazis.
