= RVF =

RVF may refer to:

- Racial Volunteer Force, a violent British neo-Nazi splinter group
- Rift Valley fever, a viral disease first reported among livestock in Rift Valley of Kenya in the early 1900s, also affecting humans
- Right ventricular failure
- La Revue du vin de France, a monthly French magazine on wine
- Rylands v Fletcher, English tort law case
