= 1976 City of Bradford Metropolitan District Council election =

1976 UK local government election

Elections to City of Bradford Metropolitan District Council were held on 6 May 1976, with one third of council up for election as well as vacancies in Bolton and Thornton. The election resulted in the Conservatives retaining control with voter turnout at 39.7%.

== Election result ==
Bradford local election result 1976
Party	Seats	Gains	Losses	Net gain/loss	Seats %	Votes %	Votes	+/−
Conservative	22	5	1	+4	66.7	48.4	62,607	-2.8%
Labour	10	1	2	-1	30.3	34.2	44,177	+2.8%
Liberal	1	0	3	-3	3.0	7.9	10,163	-3.9%
National Front	0	0	0	0	0.0	7.3	9,399	+6.1%
Ratepayers & Residents Association	0	0	0	0	0.0	1.7	2,151	-0.4%
Ind. Conservative	0	0	0	0	0.0	0.3	392	+0.3%
Communist	0	0	0	0	0.0	0.2	213	-0.0%
British National	0	0	0	0	0.0	0.1	125	+0.1%
Social Credit	0	0	0	0	0.0	0.0	74	-0.1%

This result had the following consequences for the total number of seats on the council after the elections:

Party	Previous council	New council
Conservatives	57	61
Labour	28	27
Liberals	8	5
Total	93	93
Working majority	21	29

== Ward results ==
Allerton
Party	Candidate	Votes	%	±%
Conservative	N. Walker	2,819	52.0	−6.8
Labour	J. Whiteside	1,852	34.1	+5.0
National Front	D. Regan	402	7.4	+7.4
Liberal	A. Roberts	350	6.4	−5.7
Majority		967	17.8	−11.8
Turnout		5,423	41.2	+5.1
Conservative hold		Swing	-5.9	

Baildon
Party	Candidate	Votes	%	±%
Conservative	D. Moore	2,727	52.9	+16.4
Liberal	K. Greenwood	1,502	29.1	−16.3
Labour	D. Foster	926	18.0	−0.1
Majority		1,225	23.8	+14.8
Turnout		5,155	45.8	−1.9
Conservative hold		Swing	+16.3	

Bingley: Central, East, North & West
Party	Candidate	Votes	%	±%
Conservative	M. Carter	3,379	61.6	+7.9
Labour	S. Barlow	1,107	20.2	−1.3
Liberal	P. Blaine	999	18.2	−6.6
Majority		2,272	41.4	+12.6
Turnout		5,485	45.6	+4.6
Conservative hold		Swing	+4.6	

Bolton
Party	Candidate	Votes	%	±%
Conservative	F. Lee	1,822	42.2	−6.4
Conservative	E. Wooler	1,480		
Labour	E. Brown	1,205	27.9	+0.9
Liberal	W. Sheffield	787	18.2	−6.0
Liberal	F. Sugden	694		
National Front	E. Barszak	500	11.6	+11.6
Majority		342	14.3	−7.3
Turnout		4,314	37.3	+4.1
Conservative gain from Liberal		Swing		
Conservative gain from Liberal		Swing	-3.6	

Bowling
Party	Candidate	Votes	%	±%
Labour	R. Kitson	1,104	46.0	+1.9
Conservative	P. Kitchingman	875	36.4	−2.7
National Front	J. Dawson	422	17.6	+17.6
Majority		229	9.5	+4.6
Turnout		2,401	32.1	+7.1
Labour hold		Swing	+2.3	

Bradford Moor
Party	Candidate	Votes	%	±%
Labour	J. McKenna	2,344	46.8	+11.8
Conservative	J. Ambler	1,649	32.9	−3.4
National Front	J. Merrick	1,018	20.3	+20.3
Majority		695	13.9	+12.5
Turnout		5,011	45.9	+12.3
Labour hold		Swing	+7.6	

Clayton, Ambler Thorn & Queensbury
Party	Candidate	Votes	%	±%
Conservative	J. Hirst	3,460	55.9	−10.9
Labour	C. Smith	2,056	33.2	+3.7
National Front	S. Merrick	514	8.3	+8.3
Communist	J. Baruch	160	2.6	−1.0
Majority		1,404	22.7	−14.6
Turnout		6,190	38.5	+7.5
Conservative hold		Swing	-7.3	

Craven: Silsden, Addingham, Kildwick & Steeton with Eastburn
Party	Candidate	Votes	%	±%
Conservative	A. Jerome	3,228	72.1	+16.1
Labour	R. Walton	1,249	27.9	+10.5
Majority		1,979	44.2	+12.6
Turnout		4,477	48.5	+2.6
Conservative hold		Swing	+2.8	

Denholme, Cullingworth, Bingley South & Wilsden
Party	Candidate	Votes	%	±%
Conservative	N. Nelson	3,271	79.8	+21.1
Labour	P. Wall	829	20.2	+1.1
Majority		2,442	59.6	+23.0
Turnout		4,100	40.0	−0.1
Conservative hold		Swing	+10.0	

Eccleshill
Party	Candidate	Votes	%	±%
Conservative	H. Smith	1,619	40.4	−2.8
Labour	G. Midwood	1,397	34.9	+5.5
Liberal	N. Todd	600	15.0	−8.2
National Front	K. Farrow	388	9.7	+5.5
Majority		222	5.5	−8.4
Turnout		4,004	38.3	+5.3
Conservative gain from Liberal		Swing	-4.1	

Great Horton
Party	Candidate	Votes	%	±%
Conservative	H. Oromndroyd	2,279	52.5	−2.0
Labour	D. Bowers	1,591	36.6	+5.3
National Front	W. Thay	473	10.9	+10.9
Majority		688	15.8	−7.3
Turnout		4,343	42.5	+4.2
Conservative hold		Swing	-3.6	

Haworth, Oakworth & Oxenhope
Party	Candidate	Votes	%	±%
Conservative	W. Proom	2,941	66.4	−2.1
Labour	H. Binns	1,485	33.5	+2.1
Majority		1,456	32.9	−4.3
Turnout		4,426	38.0	+5.6
Conservative hold		Swing	-2.1	

Heaton
Party	Candidate	Votes	%	±%
Conservative	R. Bateson	2,737	59.2	−14.9
Labour	B. Longbottom	1,150	24.9	−0.9
National Front	A. Cureton	431	9.3	+9.3
Liberal	R. Barton	302	6.5	+6.5
Majority		1,587	34.3	−14.0
Turnout		4,620	42.5	+8.8
Conservative hold		Swing	-7.0	

Idle
Party	Candidate	Votes	%	±%
Liberal	J. Rennison	1,622	34.6	−0.2
Conservative	H. Worsley	1,521	32.5	+7.9
Labour	K. Hemingway	1,156	24.7	+2.9
National Front	S. Matson	383	8.2	+5.9
Majority		101	2.2	−8.1
Turnout		4,682	40.5	+3.0
Liberal hold		Swing	-4.0	

Ilkley: Ben Rhydding, Ilkley North, South & West
Party	Candidate	Votes	%	±%
Conservative	J. Lightbank	2,244	51.1	+3.6
Ratepayers & Residents Association	G. Ingle	2,151	48.9	+6.4
Majority		93	2.1	−2.9
Turnout		4,395	46.5	+3.5
Conservative hold		Swing	-1.4	

Ilkley: Burley, Holme & Menston
Party	Candidate	Votes	%	±%
Conservative	K. Emsley	2,531	64.5	+11.2
Liberal	C. Svensgaard	891	22.7	−12.8
Labour	C. Hunter	500	12.7	+1.7
Majority		1,640	41.8	+24.0
Turnout		3,922	53.9	+0.4
Conservative hold		Swing	+12.0	

Keighley: Keighley Central, East & South
Party	Candidate	Votes	%	±%
Labour	E. Newby	2,044	46.7	+2.7
Conservative	H. Harrison	1,770	40.4	+4.4
National Front	G. Wright	288	6.6	+0.4
Liberal	M. Arnold	276	6.3	−7.5
Majority		274	6.3	−1.6
Turnout		4,378	40.9	+4.8
Labour hold		Swing	-0.8	

Keighley: Morton & Keighley North East
Party	Candidate	Votes	%	±%
Conservative	A. Trigg	2,023	65.3	+1.2
Labour	K. Clark	822	26.5	−0.8
National Front	S. Wood	255	8.2	−0.4
Majority		1,201	38.7	+2.0
Turnout		3,100	41.1	+7.9
Conservative hold		Swing	+1.0	

Keighley: North West & West
Party	Candidate	Votes	%	±%
Conservative	P. Gilmour	2,375	46.2	−6.3
Labour	B. Thorne	2,138	41.5	−0.3
National Front	A. Fairey	321	6.2	+0.6
Liberal	J. Arnold	311	6.0	+6.0
Majority		237	4.6	−6.0
Turnout		5,145	44.3	+8.1
Conservative gain from Labour		Swing	-3.0	

Laisterdyke
Party	Candidate	Votes	%	±%
Labour	L. Coughlin	1,393	57.3	−3.2
Conservative	R. Robinson	711	29.3	−10.2
National Front	C. Murgatroyd	325	13.4	+13.4
Majority		682	28.1	+7.0
Turnout		2,429	32.5	+10.8
Labour hold		Swing	+3.5	

Little Horton
Party	Candidate	Votes	%	±%
Labour	T. Brown	1,880	57.6	+3.2
Conservative	A. Townsend	1,018	31.2	−14.4
National Front	T. Cranston	365	11.2	+11.2
Majority		862	26.4	+17.7
Turnout		3,263	29.3	+4.3
Labour hold		Swing	+8.8	

Manningham
Party	Candidate	Votes	%	±%
Labour	F. Sunderland	1,883	49.2	+15.2
Conservative	M. Wood	1,449	37.9	−15.0
National Front	L. Ramsden	418	10.9	+10.9
Social Credit	J. Jennings	74	1.9	−1.3
Majority		434	11.3	−7.5
Turnout		3,824	34.5	+6.8
Labour gain from Conservative		Swing	+15.1	

Odsal
Party	Candidate	Votes	%	±%
Conservative	K. Caroll	2,292	54.2	−1.8
Labour	M. Thornton	1,564	37.0	−7.1
National Front	F. Harris	376	8.9	+8.9
Majority		728	17.2	+5.3
Turnout		4,232	40.9	+10.0
Conservative hold		Swing	+2.6	

Shipley: Central, North & East
Party	Candidate	Votes	%	±%
Labour	E. Saville	1,924	49.7	−12.6
Conservative	M. Holling	1,489	38.5	+2.4
Liberal	M. Stapylton	403	10.4	+10.4
Communist	L. Shields	53	1.4	−0.1
Majority		435	11.2	−15.0
Turnout		3,869	35.2	+1.8
Labour hold		Swing	-7.5	

Shipley: South & West
Party	Candidate	Votes	%	±%
Conservative	J. Evans	3,242	70.3	−0.3
Labour	F. Bastow	1,370	29.7	+9.3
Majority		1,872	40.6	−9.6
Turnout		4,612	46.2	+1.9
Conservative hold		Swing	-4.8	

Thornton
Party	Candidate	Votes	%	±%
Conservative	E. Kinder	2,336	47.8	−5.4
Conservative	G. Chapman	2,276		
Labour	F. Longstaff	1,153	23.6	−0.4
Liberal	R. Taylor	611	12.5	−10.3
National Front	D. Brook	397	8.1	+8.1
Ind. Conservative	P. Townsend	392	8.0	+8.0
Majority		1,123	24.2	−4.9
Turnout		4,889	41.8	+8.2
Conservative hold		Swing		
Conservative hold		Swing	-2.5	

Tong
Party	Candidate	Votes	%	±%
Labour	T. Mahon	2,082	62.6	+0.9
Conservative	L. Heginbotham	807	24.2	−14.1
National Front	S. Collins	314	9.4	+9.4
British National	R. Shears	125	3.8	+3.8
Majority		1,275	38.3	+15.1
Turnout		3,328	27.2	+8.2
Labour hold		Swing	+7.5	

Undercliffe
Party	Candidate	Votes	%	±%
Conservative	W. Boyce	1,419	40.1	−3.9
Labour	G. Goodyear	1,330	37.6	+3.3
National Front	D. Matson	446	12.6	+8.3
Liberal	E. McElveen	345	9.7	−7.6
Majority		89	2.5	−7.2
Turnout		3,540	40.8	+8.9
Conservative gain from Labour		Swing	-3.6	

University
Party	Candidate	Votes	%	±%
Labour	G. Rawnsley	1,370	42.4	−8.5
Conservative	T. Dines	757	23.5	−16.8
Liberal	M. Sheikh	723	22.4	+22.4
National Front	N. Ratcliffe	377	11.7	+2.9
Majority		613	19.0	+8.3
Turnout		3,227	39.6	+12.2
Labour hold		Swing	+4.1	

Wibsey
Party	Candidate	Votes	%	±%
Conservative	A. Hodgson	1,817	47.6	−18.8
Labour	T. Baines	1,149	30.1	−3.5
Liberal	A. Barker	441	11.5	+11.5
National Front	D. Brown	411	10.8	+10.8
Majority		668	17.5	−15.4
Turnout		3,818	36.5	+9.3
Conservative hold		Swing	-7.6	

Wyke
Party	Candidate	Votes	%	±%
Labour	D. Birdall	2,124	78.7	+30.7
National Front	G. Lupton	575	21.3	+21.3
Majority		1,549	57.4	+53.4
Turnout		2,699	23.7	−1.6
Labour hold		Swing	+4.7	
