= 2011 Calderdale Metropolitan Borough Council election =

2011 UK local government election

- 5 May 2011

17 of 51 seats on Calderdale Metropolitan Borough Council 26 seats needed for a majority

	First party	Second party	Third party
Leader			Tim Swift
Party	Conservative	Liberal Democrats	Labour
Leader's seat		Warley	Town
Seats before	19	17	10
Seats won	8	2	7
Seats after	21	14	13
Seat change	▲2	▼3	▲3
Popular vote	19,747	10,943	21,347
Percentage	32.3%	17.9%	35.0%
Leader before election
Stephen Baines
Conservative
Leader after election
Janet Battye
Liberal Democrat (UK)

Elections to Calderdale Metropolitan Borough Council took place on Thursday 5 May 2011.

2011 local election results in Calderdale

There were 17 seats up for election, one third of the council. After the election the council continued to have no overall control and continue to be run by a coalition between the Labour Party and the Liberal Democrats.

During 2011 the Liberal Democrat councillor for the Warley Ward, Robert Pearson, left the Liberal Democrats and spent the remainder of his time on the council as an Independent Liberal Democrat. Councillor Tom Bates of the BNP left the party and continued his term as an independent councillor.

== Election result ==
Calderdale Metropolitan Borough Council Election, 2011
Party	Candidates						Votes		
Party	Stood	Elected	Gained	Unseated	Net	% of total	%	No.	Net %
Labour	17	7	3	0	+3	41.2	35.0	21,347	
Conservative	17	8	3	1	+2	47.1	32.3	19,747	
Liberal Democrats	17	2	0	3	-3	11.8	17.9	10,943	
Independent	7	0	0	2	-2	0.0	6.8	4,165	
Green	6	0	0	0	0	0.0	3.6	2,175	
BNP	6	0	0	0	0	0.0	3.4	2,099	
BPP	1	0	0	0	0	0.0	0.3	203	

== Council composition ==
Before the election the composition of the council was:

↓
19	17	10	4	1
Conservative	Lib Dem	Labour	Ind	BN

After the election the composition of the council was:

↓
21	14	13	2	1
Conservative	Lib Dem	Labour	Ind	BN

Party	Previous council	New council
Conservative	19	21
Liberal Democrats	17	14
Labour	10	13
Independent	4	2
BNP	1	1
Total	51	51

== Ward results ==
=== Brighouse ward ===
Brighouse
Party	Candidate	Votes	%	±%
Conservative	Scott Lloyd Benton	1,278	35.2	−3.3
Labour Co-op	Edith Ann Martin	1,180	32.5	+1.6
Independent	Joyce Cawthra	968	26.7	−11.8
Liberal Democrats	Mat Bowles	200	5.5	−5.7
Majority				
Turnout				
Conservative gain from Independent		Swing		

The incumbent was Joyce Cawthra as an independent. She had been elected as a Conservative.

=== Calder ward ===
Calder
Party	Candidate	Votes	%	±%
Labour	Dave Young	1,660	35.8	−1.0
Liberal Democrats	Hywel Morgan	1,042	22.5	−16.6
Conservative	Gail Patricia Lund	915	19.7	+19.7
Green	Alan Patrick McDonald	754	16.3	−7.8
Independent	Stephen Denis Curry	262	5.7	+5.7
Majority				
Turnout				
Labour gain from Liberal Democrats		Swing		

The incumbent was David O'Neill for the Liberal Democrats.

=== Elland ward ===
Elland
Party	Candidate	Votes	%	±%
Conservative	John Frank Brearley Ford	997	32.2	+10.5
Liberal Democrats	Stella Haigh	932	30.1	−18.6
Labour	Angi Gallagher	905	29.2	+14.7
Green	Susan Ann Thomas	262	8.5	+8.6
Majority				
Turnout				
Conservative gain from Independent		Swing		

The incumbent was Diane Park, an Independent. She had been elected as a Liberal Democrat.

=== Greetland and Stainland ward ===
Greetland and Stainland
Party	Candidate	Votes	%	±%
Liberal Democrats	Peter Joseph Wardhaugh	1,271	37.5	−15.8
Conservative	Sam Stafford	1,138	33.5	+9.8
Labour	Jim Gallagher	722	21.3	+11.7
Green	Mark Richard Mullany	261	7.7	+2.6
Majority				
Turnout				
Liberal Democrats hold		Swing		

The incumbent was Peter Wardhaugh for the Liberal Democrats.

=== Hipperholme and Lightcliffe ward ===
Hipperholme and Lightcliffe
Party	Candidate	Votes	%	±%
Conservative	David Eric Kirton	1,628	43.0	−2.6
Independent	Chris O'Connor	1,256	33.2	+0.7
Labour	Anthony Rutherford	710	18.8	+3.8
Liberal Democrats	Jennie Rigg	188	5.0	−1.8
Majority				
Turnout				
Conservative hold		Swing		

The incumbent was David Kirton for the Conservative Party.

=== Illingworth and Mixenden ward ===
Illingworth and Mixenden
Party	Candidate	Votes	%	±%
Labour Co-op	Barry Kaye Collins	1,489	44.4	+1.8
Conservative	Andrew James Tagg	1,039	31.0	+12.0
BNP	Jane Ann Shooter	614	18.3	−12.0
Liberal Democrats	Kenneth Albrett	109	3.3	−2.2
Independent	Seán Vincent Loftus	101	3.0	+0.4
Majority				
Turnout				
Labour hold		Swing		

The incumbent was Barry Collins for the Labour Party.

=== Luddendenfoot ward ===
Luddendenfoot
Party	Candidate	Votes	%	±%
Conservative	Richard Hugh Marshall	1,414	38.7	+5.1
Labour Co-op	Simon Robert Young	1,361	37.2	+17.9
Liberal Democrats	John Boje Frederiksen	879	24.1	−9.5
Majority				
Turnout				
Conservative hold		Swing		

The incumbent was Richard Marshall for the Conservative Party.

=== Northowram and Shelf ward ===
Northowram and Shelf
Party	Candidate	Votes	%	±%
Conservative	Roger Laurence Taylor	2,142	56.0	+2.2
Labour	Gary Walsh	1,205	31.5	+9.2
BNP	Simon Michael Gill	262	6.9	−7.7
Liberal Democrats	Glen Mattock	213	5.6	−3.8
Majority				
Turnout				
Conservative hold		Swing		

The incumbent was Roger Taylor for the Conservative Party.

=== Ovenden ward ===
Ovenden
Party	Candidate	Votes	%	±%
Labour Co-op	Bryan Thomas Raymond Smith	1,265	57.1	+13.9
Conservative	Peter Caffrey	464	20.9	+3.9
BNP	Katie Jane Gill	330	14.9	−14.8
Liberal Democrats	John Dennis Reynolds	157	7.1	−3.0
Majority		801		
Turnout		2,231		
Labour hold		Swing		

The incumbent was Bryan Smith for the Labour Party.

=== Park ward ===
Park
Party	Candidate	Votes	%	±%
Labour	Faisal Shoukat	2,353	52.5	+17.1
Liberal Democrats	Shazad Fazal	1,272	28.4	+4.3
Independent	Shakar Saghir	444	9.9	−3.5
Conservative	Naveed Khan	416	9.3	+9.3
Majority		1,081		
Turnout		4,553	51.39	
Labour hold		Swing		

The incumbent was Arshad Mahmood for the Labour Party.

=== Rastrick ward ===
Rastrick
Party	Candidate	Votes	%	±%
Conservative	Chris Pillai	1,239	35.5	−7.5
Labour Co-op	Peter Judge	1,136	32.6	+7.4
Independent	Adrian Hartshorn	673	19.3	+19.3
Liberal Democrats	Nick Yates	439	12.6	+3.2
Majority		103		
Turnout		3,498	41.01	
Conservative hold		Swing		

The incumbent was Craig Whittaker for the Conservative Party.

=== Ryburn ward ===
Ryburn
Party	Candidate	Votes	%	±%
Conservative	Robert Ernest Thornber	1,896	53.0	+2.9
Labour	Judy Gannon	1,089	30.4	+13.1
Green	Freda Mary Davis	300	8.4	+8.4
Liberal Democrats	Malcolm Graham James	292	8.2	−16.3
Majority		807		
Turnout		3,594	41.91	
Conservative hold		Swing		

The incumbent was Robert Thornber for the Conservative Party.

=== Skircoat ward ===
Skircoat
Party	Candidate	Votes	%	±%
Conservative	Marcus Joseph Chance Thompson	1,584	36.7	+3.7
Liberal Democrats	Stephen Gow	1,401	32.5	−11.0
Labour Co-op	Anne Collins	993	23.0	+11.6
Green	Charles Gate	339	7.9	+3.9
Majority		183		
Turnout		4,335	45.87	
Conservative gain from Liberal Democrats		Swing		

The incumbent was Stephen Gow for the Liberal Democrats.

=== Sowerby Bridge ward ===
Sowerby Bridge
Party	Candidate	Votes	%	±%
Labour Co-op	Dave Draycott	1,364	43.2	+10.8
Conservative	Andrew David Feather	1,164	36.9	+1.2
BNP	Emma Louise Haldenby	315	10.0	−8.3
Liberal Democrats	Denise Jagger	312	9.9	−3.7
Majority		200		
Turnout		3,170	38.35	
Labour gain from Conservative		Swing		

The incumbent was Andrew Feather for the Conservative Party.

=== Todmorden ward ===
Todmorden
Party	Candidate	Votes	%	±%
Labour	Jayne Booth	1,182	32.5	+10.5
Conservative	Julie Louise Stansfield	822	22.6	+0.2
Liberal Democrats	Olwen Jennings	705	19.4	−12.6
Independent	David William O'Neill	461	12.7	+12.7
Green	Kate Sweeny	259	7.1	−3.2
BPP	David Jones	203	5.6	+5.6
Majority		360		
Turnout		3,667	43.69	
Labour gain from Liberal Democrats		Swing		

The incumbent was Olwen Jennings for the Liberal Democrats.

=== Town ward ===
Town
Party	Candidate	Votes	%	±%
Labour Co-op	Timothy John Swift	1,552	53.5	+5.7
Conservative	Geoffrey Thompson	828	28.5	+9.3
BNP	Richard Wayne Armstrong	325	11.2	−7.9
Liberal Democrats	James Baker	197	6.8	−1.2
Majority		724		
Turnout		2,928	33.95	
Labour hold		Swing		

The incumbent was Timothy Swift for the Labour Party.

=== Warley ward ===
Warley
Party	Candidate	Votes	%	±%
Liberal Democrats	Keith Jones Hutson	1,334	37.6	−8.4
Labour Co-op	Martin Burton	1,181	33.3	+25.1
Conservative	Beverley Anne Carter	783	22.1	+7.5
BNP	Paul Leslie Steven Wadsworth	253	7.1	−4.6
Majority		398		
Turnout		3,567	41.88	
Liberal Democrats hold		Swing		

The incumbent was Jennifer Pearson for the Liberal Democrats.
