= Nationalist Alliance =

British far-right movement

- Leader: Catherine Parker-Brown
- Founded: 2005
- Dissolved: 2008
- Headquarters: England, United Kingdom
- Ideology: Far-right

The Nationalist Alliance was a far-right movement in British politics that aimed to serve as an umbrella group for the various white supremacist groups in Britain. The party was registered with the Electoral Commission in 2005, although its registration has since lapsed.

== History and activities ==
Founded in 2004 by majority-BNP members, the NA sought to build a closer alliance with other groups on the far right that were not affiliated with and worked outside of the British National Party. One such alliance was a potential merge with the Freedom Party, though this did not come to pass, as Adrian Davies, chairman of the party, felt reluctant to join with some of the more extremist elements of the NA.

Seeking to further ties with other far-right activists, the party held a meeting attended by members of the White Nationalist Party and the National Front at Rawdon Conservative Club in September 2005 as a memorial to John Tyndall, British fascist political activist and previous chairman of the National Front. The event featured an address by a number of notable far-right nationalists, such as Richard Edmonds, member of the BNP, Eddy Morrison, NA party leader and ex-leader of the White Nationalist Party, and John Wood, former senior member of the WNP. Towards the end of the meeting, the club had some of its windows smashed by unknown assailants; the club secretary later stated that the event had been booked under a false address with the booking secretary, and that he had been unaware of the nature of the group before the event took place.

== Split ==
The meeting held at Rawdon brought media attention upon both the NA and the far-right activists affiliated with the event, and leading to its eventual split. A photograph of some of the members inside the meeting appeared in an edition of Searchlight magazine, leading to accusations made amongst the activists as to where and from whom the image had come from.

Along with the failure of the Freedom Party initiative and the rise of ideological clashes within the party, the NA split in September of 2005, with Morrison, Wood and Watmough breaking off to form the British Peoples Party.

The split led to recriminations across the far-right movement, Morrison himself being verbally attacked by Martin Webster - former far-right leader and political activist - on Webster's online bulletin, Webster having accused Morrison of simply using the NA as a way to collect money from its members, a charge Morrison denied.

== Existing party activities and membership drift ==
Despite the split, the Nationalist Alliance continued to operate as a political entity, offering a political platform for nativist politics in favour of deportation, capital punishment and white nationalism. The Alliance - largely under the direction of former Burnly BNP activist Sharon Pastow - continued their moves towards a wider alliance amongst the far-right in Britain by working closely with the National Front and the England First Party (EFP), whilst holding a large dual membership with the Wolf's Hook White Brotherhood, a splinter group of the BNP founded in 2004. The white supremacist organisation Patriots of the White European Resistance ("P.O.W.E.R.") described the NA as a "brother of the 816" in an April 2007 newsletter, referring to the greeting of "816" reported to have been used by members of the organisation. It was reported by Searchlight that at least at least four known members of the NA were known to have been members of the online forums run by P.O.W.E.R. at some point.

In November 2006, a prominent member of the Nationalist Alliance, Mick "Belsen" Sanderson, was stabbed to death in Nottingham following a fight with fellow NA member John Pakulski. Pakulski was sentenced to six years of imprisonment for manslaughter for the murder, whilst fellow member Catherine Parker-Brown received a community order for conspiracy to pervert the course of justice after she was found to have attempted to clean the scene of the crime. Parker-Brown had been a former organiser for the BNP in the East Midlands and was formerly the nominal leader of the NA, though their membership had later become largely interchangeable with the increasingly more prominent EFP.

The Wolf's Hook White Brotherhood - which had been considered a sister organisation to the NA - has since ceased to exist, with most of its membership transferring to the Racial Volunteer Force. Beyond a former internet presence and its occasional publication Axiom (succeeding its two previous publications, Vanguard and Imperium, which have since been published by the BNP), the party is by and large defunct.

== Previous use of the name ==
The name had been used 'in house' for an initiative driven by Andrew Brons to achieve a reconciliation and joint electoral action between the Flag Group and the BNP in 1986, a move which ultimately came to nothing. The modern incarnation of the Nationalist Alliance has no connection to this proposal.
