= John Graeme Wood =

English politician (1933–2007)

John Graeme Wood (27 December 1933 – 22 November 2007) was an English politician who was prominent on the far-right political scene from the late 1950s until his death.

== Career ==
Wood was a member of Sir Oswald Mosley's Union Movement and became a Branch Leader. He remained in the UM until 1964, when he joined the British National Party. Remaining with the BNP, Wood became a founding member of the National Front when it was formed in 1967. He was later expelled after it was discovered he had joined under the assumed name John Howard ffrench (two lower-case f's).

Wood left the British far right not long after this as work commitments took him to the Federal Republic of Germany. While there, he established links with the National Democratic Party.

After returning to Britain, Wood linked up with Eddy Morrison in Leeds and followed him into the New National Front. In April 1982 at the Charing Cross Hotel in London, Wood was present at the launch of the (third) British National Party. John Tyndall and a few others, including Charles Parker, Tyndall's father-in-Law, wanted the new party to be called the National Party but Wood, under pressure from a great majority of northern nationalists in Leeds and Manchester, persuaded Tyndall to adopt the name of the BNP. At the meeting Wood announced that he was there as a representative of the League of Saint George. Wood remained with the BNP until 1990, when he resigned from the party due to personality clashes with some moderate senior officers. He continued to appear as a guest speaker at party events, fulfilling a similar function for the NF and other groups, without formally participating in any group.

Wood joined the NF in the late 1990s when Morrison became the group's organiser in Yorkshire, although the two became estranged soon afterwards. However they eventually renewed their alliance and when the White Nationalist Party was formed in 2002, Wood was offered the position of propaganda and training officer, which he accepted. Later, in 2003, he led the party as national organiser. In 2004 he sided with Morrison as the group split and became part of a tendency known as the Spearhead Support Group. This group was loosely associated with John Tyndall in his ultimately failed attempt to regain the leadership of the British National Party from Nick Griffin, although it also flirted with the NF. As this group began to disintegrate Wood briefly served as leader of a rump WNP before in 2005 agreeing to merge into the Nationalist Alliance, another group that Morrison had established a few months earlier. This group further split in September 2005 with Wood joining Morrison and Kevin Watmough in establishing the British Peoples Party as a new entity. Wood became chairman of the BPP with Morrison as national organiser. Wood's membership was short-lived however as he was expelled from the BPP following personality clashes with Morrison and Watmough, who would publicly accuse Wood of being an ideological "traitor" without elaborating on the claim.

This marked the effective end of his political career and he decided to distance himself from fringe politics. From then and until his death, Wood enjoyed a semi-retirement from nationalist politics. Nonetheless, in 2006 he applied to rejoin the BNP, but his application was turned down by the BNP's leadership. Despite this, Wood maintained good relations with his local BNP branch in Sheffield and provided the branch with both advice and financial support in the run up to the UK's 2007 local elections.

During the last two years of his life Wood wrote a blog, which he documented his family life and his times with his mistress, Iris.
