= Racial Volunteer Force =

British neo-Nazi organisation

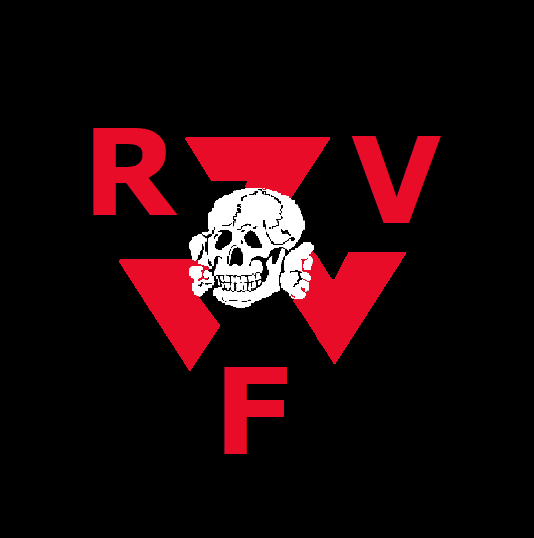
Logo used by the Racial Volunteer Force

The Racial Volunteer Force (RVF) is a violent neo-Nazi splinter group of the British neo-Nazi group Combat 18 (C18) with close ties to the far right paramilitary group, British Freedom Fighters. Although originating as a breakaway group, the RVF has since re-established links to C18 whilst maintaining a distinct identity. In addition to the United Kingdom, RVF has chapters in the Netherlands and Finland.

== Formation ==
The RVF emerged in 2002 after a split in C18. The long-established extreme right group had entered a period of severe inactivity under the leadership of Will Browning, leading to a sense of frustration amongst activists keen to reignite activity. As a consequence a group of militants under the leadership of Mark Atkinson, a long-term activist in C18, and John Hill, an Oldham-based organiser, split to establish the RVF as a separate paramilitary organisation.

The RVF claims to be part of an international organisation led by a European Council and states that it aims for unity between all National Socialists and white nationalists (including Combat 18) in an alliance against the supposed Zionist Occupation Government. The group has garnered a reputation for its highly violent nature to the extent that other groups on the fringes of the British far right have sought to avoid being publicly associated with the RVF.

== Trial ==
A few of the group's members were arrested in 2003 on suspicions of weapons stockpiling and other charges and five members, including Atkinson and Hill, subsequently pleaded guilty to conspiracy whilst a sixth, November 9th Society leader Kevin Quinn pleaded guilty to possession of the banned booklet The Longest Hatred. According to Peter Davies, the Assistant Chief Constable of Lincolnshire Police (the force making the arrests), "it is difficult to imagine more extreme race hatred than was contained in the material which was seized during this meticulous enquiry. In addition to the guilty pleas last month, we can draw satisfaction from the fact that the Lincolnshire Police investigation team succeeded in discrediting and disrupting the organisation behind the production of this material". Amongst the offending items which came to light at the trial were an RVF magazine that encouraged violence, guides on how to make nail bombs and incendiary devices and copies of the Polish neo-Nazi magazine Stormer. The police had first become aware of the group whilst monitoring far right and racist websites and their investigations led them to Nigel Piggins, who was sentenced to two and a half years imprisonment for his part in the affair.

== Activities ==
The group has been investigated for a series of threats made to journalists. According to Hope not Hate, an anti-fascist campaigning group organised by Searchlight magazine, members former members of the RVF have attended events run by the English Defence League.

The RVF has been active in street violence against perceived enemies, including attacks on anti-fascists in Blackpool and Republican Sinn Féin supporters in Glasgow. Various members have also been seen at street demonstrations in the Netherlands confronting anti-fascists. Early in 2009, alleged RVF activists were raided by counter terrorism police in south west England on suspicion of bomb making. The alleged members were later released due to lack of evidence.

The RVF has also been associated with hardliners within the National Front (NF) under the leadership of Leeds organiser Tony White and his associates Stuart Hollingdale and Dave Hill. On Remembrance Day 2008, RVF members joined White's supporters, along with members of other extreme right groups including the British People's Party, British Freedom Fighters and the Patriots of the White European Resistance, in holding a march to the Cenotaph, Whitehall. This group took a leading role in criticising Terry Blackham's leadership of the NF. Links between the RVF and the NF were noted in 2010, when the nomination papers for NF council election candidate Nick Walsh in the council election in Kingston upon Hull were signed by Nigel Piggins. The RVF was again linked to the NF in late 2011 after RVF members attended an NF event commemorating John Tyndall in Preston.

As of 2013, the group was said to be still active, with around 80-100 members. They had become particularly critical of the English Defence League, accusing them of being a Zionist organisation established to gather intelligence on neo-Nazis.
