= Sharon Ebanks =

British politician

Leader of the New Nationalist Party
- In office 2006–2007

Personal details
- Party: New Nationalist Party (2006 - 2007); British National Party (Until 2006)

Sharon Elizabeth Ebanks (born 1963 or 1964) is former member of the British National Party and one of the founder members of the New Nationalist Party. In 2006, she was wrongly declared elected to Birmingham City Council.

== BNP activism ==
Ebanks was the British National Party (BNP) organiser in Birmingham, and was the BNP candidate in Birmingham Erdington in the 2005 general election.

She came to wider prominence in the 2006 local elections when she was announced as the winner of a council seat in the Kingstanding ward of Birmingham City Council.

While the other 39 wards in Birmingham were each electing a single candidate, in Kingstanding there were two vacancies, as an incumbent councillor in the ward had resigned. Therefore, each voter was able to cast two votes on their ballot paper. The Labour, Liberal Democrat and Conservative Parties each stood two candidates for the two vacancies, while a number of minor parties - including the BNP - stood just one.

It initially appeared that Ebanks had been elected in first place, with a Labour candidate elected in second and the other Labour candidate missing out in third place. Two recounts were called by the Conservative and Labour candidates, which appeared to confirm this result.

However, following the declaration, the deputy returning officer discovered an error in the calculation of the results which meant that the 'mixed' votes - where a voter had split their two votes between candidates of different parties - had all been counted twice. As Ebanks was the BNP's only candidate in the ward, a large number of her votes had been 'split' in this way, with voters casting one vote for the BNP and one vote for another party. Because of this, a large proportion of BNP votes had been double-counted. 2,367 votes had been counted twice, including just under 1,000 votes cast in support of Ebanks. As 4,981 ballot papers were issued, with two votes to be cast per ballot, the maximum number of votes that could have been cast was 9,962; but on the declared result, a total of 12,329 votes were recorded against the candidates.

However, as Ebanks had already been declared elected, it was determined that the result would have to stand until overturned by an election petition, to be brought by the defeated Labour candidate. Birmingham City Council announced that they would not contest the petition, although Ebanks did so. The petition was presented to the High Court in July 2006 and accepted; the result was thus overturned. Labour's Catherine Grundy was declared the rightful winner and took Ebanks' place on the council.

== Ethnicity and BNP departure ==
Following the election it was alleged by Ebanks' stepmother that her biological father was a Black Jamaican Radwell Ebanks. However Ebanks, who had been a critic of interracial marriage, denied that Radwell Ebanks was her father to the Sunday Mercury. She claimed that she was the result of an affair her mother had with a Scotsman.

In September 2006 Ebanks was expelled from the BNP for reasons that the BBC described as 'unexplained' although Ebanks herself claimed "I'm sacked for speaking out about the lack of transparency regarding the BNP accounts and I am apparently being charged with being anti-Semitic". Searchlight magazine, which campaigns against the BNP, claimed that her expulsion came from a dispute with the party's legal officer Lee Barnes over paying for the legal fight that followed the disputed election. Simon Darby, at the time the BNP organiser in the area, refused to reveal the reason for her expulsion but stated that they had nothing to do with her family background.

== New Nationalist Party ==
Later in 2006, she set up the New Nationalist Party (NNP), of which she was the Chairman until the party's closure less than a year after its founding.

She stood as a NNP candidate for Kingstanding in the 2007 Birmingham City Council election. She received only 171 votes and was not elected.

== General elections contested ==
Date of election	Constituency	Party	Votes	%
2005	Birmingham Erdington	BNP	1512	4.8
