= Kevin Quinn (neo-Nazi) =

English neo-Nazi

Kevin Quinn (born 1965) is a British neo-Nazi and the current leader of the November 9th Society (N9S).

== Biography ==
Quinn was born in Northampton. He was an officer in the Territorial Army and later worked as a psychiatric nurse.

According to the former website of the November 9th Society, Quinn initially was director of security and personal bodyguard to Terry Flynn, the founder of the movement, until he became leader himself, taking the title of national director, in 2000. According to the Electoral Commission's register of political parties, from August 2004, he was party leader, nominating officer and treasurer of the British First Party until it was "voluntarily deregistered" on 28 July 2010.

In 2005, as a member of Combat 18, Quinn was charged with distributing copies of The Longest Hatred: An Examination of Anti-gentilism, a book effectively banned when Lady Jane Birdwood had been convicted in 1991 for distributing it. He pleaded guilty to possession of racist material and was given a suspended sentence, although attempts to prove links to the Racial Volunteer Force were not pursued.

In September 2008, Quinn appeared before St Albans Crown Court on a charge of racially aggravated public disorder. The charge related to an incident in South Oxhey on 1 December 2007 after he had abused ethnic minority passers-by from a British First Party table that he had set up in the area. The jury failed to agree on a verdict, but he was convicted and given a six-month suspended prison sentence at a retrial in St Albans Crown Court in April 2009.
