= Redwatch =

British far-right website

- Website type: Far-right politics, anti-communism
- Available in: English
- Founded: March 1992 (in print); Early 2000s (website)
- Dissolved: Summer 2019
- Predecessor: Redwatch (print magazine)
- Headquarters: West Yorkshire, United Kingdom
- Owner: Simon Sheppard
- Website: redwatch.org (defunct) redwatch.org.uk (defunct) redwatch.net (defunct) redwatch.co.uk (defunct)
- Commercial: No
- Registration: None
- Current status: Defunct

Redwatch was a British website, previously a magazine, associated with members of the far-right British People's Party. It published photographs of, and personal information about, alleged far left and anti-fascist activists. It typically targeted activists in political parties, advocacy groups, trade unions and the media. The website's slogan was "Remember places, traitors' faces, they'll all pay for their crimes", a quote from neo-Nazi musician Ian Stuart Donaldson.

The information gathered by Redwatch was indexed by cities or regions. Many of the people listed were members of the Unite Against Fascism or other anti-racist or left-wing groups, such as the Socialist Party (England and Wales), the Socialist Party (Ireland), Sinn Féin, Social Democratic and Labour Party, Alliance for Workers' Liberty, Workers' Power (UK) and Socialist Workers Party (Britain). Some Labour Party, Liberal Democrat and Conservative members were also listed. Trade unionists, in particular teachers and journalists, figured prominently in the listings. There were dozens of photographs of anarchists and single-issue protesters.

== History ==
A now-defunct printed magazine Redwatch was first published by the neo-Nazi paramilitary group Combat 18 in March 1992, when its slogan was "oderint dum metuant": "let them hate as long as they fear" (a quotation from Caligula).

The website was hosted by Simon Sheppard, a former British National Party (BNP) member who was expelled from the organisation after circulating a leaflet which the leadership of the BNP regarded as a prima facie breach of race-discrimination legislation. Other BNP contributors to Redwatch included Adrian Marsden (a former BNP councillor in Halifax), Mike Lester (then the party's organiser in Stockport, named "Activist of the Year" at a Red, White and Blue festival organised by the party), Trevor Agnew (County Durham organiser and confidant of Nick Griffin, then the BNP leader) Mark Collett (then the Yorkshire BNP organiser), Keith McFarlane (a leading Sunderland activist at the time) and others. On 1 May 2005, Sheppard's home in Hull was searched by police investigating "incitement to racial hatred."

In January 2004, questions concerning the legality of the Redwatch website were raised in the House of Lords. The Home Office stated that listing public information online is not a crime.

The website has been heavily criticised by the Trades Union Congress and many affiliated unions. Following the TUC's annual Congress in September 2004, where an anti-Redwatch resolution was passed, the TUC General Secretary Brendan Barber wrote to Home Secretary David Blunkett, requesting a meeting to discuss the issue. Further discussions and correspondence with government members ensued, and in March 2005, a meeting took place with Home Secretary Charles Clarke. The TUC have promised to provide the Home Secretary with examples of experiences that trade unionists and other left-wing campaigners have had as a result of having their details published on Redwatch, whilst the Home Secretary promised to hold discussions with the police about what could be done to stop the activities of the website.

The website temporarily became unavailable around 6 December 2008, with all of its various URLs leading directly to error or Internet service provider pages. It returned later that month. On 2 March 2013 the anti-fascist Hope not Hate claimed that the police had arrested Kevin Watmough from Redwatch and confiscated his computers for investigation.

Redwatch justified its content as a reaction to leftist websites and magazines who display similar content: "Photographs and information about the reds who attempt to harass and assault British Nationalists and their families. The red scum target us, Redwatch plays them at their own game". Justifications provided by the website include an email circulated in August 2001 by the Anti-Nazi League, containing the home addresses of Nick Griffin (leader of the British National Party) and his mother, who was involved in the organisation of a BNP festival.

The website went offline in the summer of 2019.

== Association with violence ==
There have been many reports to the police of people receiving death threats after their details have appeared on the Redwatch website. These have included Members of Parliament and their families. According to Searchlight, a Leeds teacher who complained about a far right activist, Antony White, leafleting his school, had his details listed on Redwatch, allegedly after the jailing of White. Far right supporters then firebombed the teacher's car.

According to Indymedia, an anti-racist was followed and attacked on 16 May 2006 after the recent appearance of his personal data on the Redwatch website. The assailants reportedly shouted "We'll kill you, you leftist motherfucker!"

Due to its association with violence, BNP leader Nick Griffin warned party members not to use the site. However, in 2004 BNP Youth organiser Mark Collett was filmed discussing the website with BNP councillor Dave Midgley, accusing the website of promoting a "street war" between the far-right and far-left. Collett also claimed that the site was organised by the National Front, and told Midgley how to post pictures of a local councillor, while acknowledging that it was against the party's policy.

Merseyside Trades Union Congress organiser Alec McFadden received death threats shortly after his details appeared on the website. At precisely the same time, Joe Owens, a Merseyside BNP candidate with several convictions for violent offences, began sending him emails gloating that he had photographic details of his house, car and family. Since standing as a Respect - The Unity Coalition candidate in the May 2006 elections, McFadden has been physically attacked, including being stabbed in the face at his home.

In May 2006, a Polish political activist was attacked and stabbed, requiring surgery. He stated that he believed the attack was linked to his recent listing on the Polish version of the website. In March 2008, the attacker, a member of the neo-Nazi group Blood and Honour, was sentenced to ten years imprisonment for attempted murder.

== Websites outside Britain ==
The British website links to Redwatch sites in Poland, Germany, the Netherlands and New Zealand. As of January 2007, the links provided for New Zealand, Germany, and the Netherlands led to a Blogspot blog with no posts, an unrelated cybersquatted site, and a dead link respectively. The Polish site was closed in December 2024.

In 2010, three men were sentenced to short jail terms (up to one and a half years), for their role in editing the Polish Redwatch site.
