= New Nationalist Party (UK) =

British far-right political party

- Leader: Sharon Ebanks
- Founded: 2006
- Dissolved: 2007
- Headquarters: Birmingham, West Midlands
- Ideology: Euroscepticism; Nationalism
- Political position: Far-right
- Colours: Black and white

The New Nationalist Party was a small, far-right political party founded by former members of the British National Party (BNP) in 2006. It was based in the West Midlands and its most prominent member was the former BNP member Sharon Ebanks. Earlier in 2006, Ebanks was briefly a councillor in the Kingstanding ward in Birmingham before being forced to resign when it was shown that she had been awarded it due to counting irregularities despite losing the election.

The party, which used the slogan "Neither Left nor Right, but British", was registered with the Electoral Commission on 11 December 2006 and deregistered on 1 November 2008.

== Campaigns ==
Unlike the BNP, which now generally tends to be hostile towards Islam, the NNP stated that it was less critical of external influences, and that it concentrated more on local, community based politics. The party was also involved with a campaign to combat drug dealers in schools in Birmingham.

The party also took a leading role in the campaign to save Kingstanding community centre from demolition, with Ebanks accusing local councillors of lying after they stated the building had been condemned as unsafe due to the presence of asbestos.

== Leading members ==
The party held its inaugural meeting in January 2007 in the West Midlands. Officials appointed at that time were Sharon Ebanks (chairman), Dave Cheetham (deputy chairman), Keith Axon (treasurer), Matthew Benton (nominating officer), Tim Simons (party legal officer), Maureen Davies (national fundraiser) and David Williams (website editor).

The NNP did not have any elected councillors or Members of Parliament, nor did it inherit any councillors who had belonged to the BNP.

== Policies ==
Unlike an earlier breakaway, the England First Party, which supports English nationalism, the NNP remained supportive of British nationalism, although it campaigned to make St George's Day a national holiday.

According to the NNP website the party's policies included:

- Increasing spending on the National Health Service, and putting in safeguards to prevent "health tourism" in the future.
- Abolition of the "postcode lottery" in health care.
- Withdrawal from North Atlantic Treaty Organization (NATO) and withdrawal of British Forces Germany to areas of the United Kingdom that are in need of economic regeneration.
- Preservation of the UK's strategic nuclear deterrent.
- Repeal of the European Communities Act 1972 and the establishment of fair trade links with Commonwealth of Nations countries.
- Imposition of a complete ban on immigration, and deportation of all illegal immigrants and foreign criminals residing in British jails.
- Outlawing affirmative action practices in the workplace.
- Increasing the basic state pension to an acceptable level.
- Britain's role as a G8 country will be one of a humanitarian nature, with the aim of ending Third World poverty, through positive G8 policies.

Its policy base was dismissed by the Daily Mirror which described the party as being "anti-European, anti-immigrant party. But wants free dental care for all, which is nice."

== Electoral activity ==
The NNP's first foray into electoral politics came at the 2007 local elections with the party standing four candidates in Birmingham and one each in North Tyneside and Teesside. The presence of the party in local elections in Birmingham was by the Birmingham Mail as effectively ending any hope of the BNP gaining a council seat in the city due to a split far right vote. This was proven correct as the BNP's vote in the city fell considerably from its previous level.

It obtained 357 votes across Birmingham and only 59 votes in Whitley Bay ward, North Tyneside. Ebanks managed 171 votes in Kingstanding and was not elected. Labour Party councillor Peter Kane, who won the seat, claimed that with the failure of the NNP "the Kingstanding people are sending out the message that we are a community which will solve problems together."
