= White Nationalist Party =

British neo-fascist political party

The White Nationalist Party (WNP) was a British neo-Nazi political party, founded in May 2002 as "the British political wing of Aryan Unity".

== Development ==
The party was formed by Eddy Morrison and Kevin Watmough, "a key figure in Combat 18" and webmaster of Redwatch; the new party was effectively the Yorkshire branch of the National Front, and the party conducted most of its activities in Yorkshire. The national youth leader of the White Nationalist Party was Ronnie Cooper, a teen from the South Yorkshire area who was exposed for his fascist beliefs by the Sunday People newspaper in 2003. Cooper is now understood to be a serving member of the Royal Navy.

Although largely Yorkshire-based, it sought to expand elsewhere. In 2003 the group applied to march in Glasgow but it was rejected by the city council.

The WNP also sought to campaign in amongst loyalists in Northern Ireland, posting stickers and delivering leaflets in Ballymena, Coleraine, Antrim town and Ballymoney in the run-up to the Twelfth in 2003. The group, which emphasised its anti-Irish republican nature by using slogans such as "hang IRA scum" in its literature, claimed to have 80 members in the province in May of that year. In a move condemned by local politicians WNP flags were also placed on lampposts in Ballymena around the same time. Most of the party's stickers and flags were removed by parties of residents organised in opposition by the left wing loyalist Progressive Unionist Party, which publicly condemned racism.

In 2004 the party also revealed plans to host a Blood & Honour music festival in Northern Ireland although a counter-campaign was organised to encourage venues to turn down the booking. The proposed gigs did not take place, however.

The WNP was severely weakened in 2004 when the England First Party (EFP) broke away under Mark Cotterill. The WNP had intended to use that name when the Electoral Commission refused to register WNP as an official name; but after a dispute between Cotterill on the one side and Eddy Morrison and John G. Wood (the WNP's national organiser) on the other, the EFP group broke away to become a separate, English nationalist, party.

The WNP under Morrison and John G. Wood courted John Tyndall, although he refused to join as he did not feel that divisions were helpful. Eventually Eddy Morrison left the party and with John G. Wood and Kevin Watmough in 2005 formed the similar British People's Party.

== Policies and ideology ==
The White Nationalist Party's inspiration was "unashamedly nationalist socialist" and opposed to "all democracy". The WP had a list of 32 policies, based on principles which included repatriation, opposition to populism, Zionism and homosexuality, and adherence to David Lane's fourteen words. The group is now vehemently opposed to the British National Party, viewing them as race traitors.
