= Simon Sheppard (activist) =

British far-right extremist

- Born: Simon Guy Sheppard; 1957 (age 68–69); Hull, England
- Political party: British National Party
- Status: Prisoner
- Convictions: Holocaust denial (Netherlands); Inciting racial hatred, child sex offences (UK)
- Penalty: Imprisoned (Netherlands, 1995); Imprisoned (UK, various dates)

Simon Guy Sheppard (born 1957) is a British far-right political activist from Hull, England, who runs a number of websites that promote misogynist and antisemitic doctrines. His main website contains many articles about women, the multiracial society, and Jews, stating that they have negative effects upon western society and for white males in particular.

He has been prosecuted three, and imprisoned four times for his ideology: in the Netherlands for disseminating Holocaust denial propaganda in 1995, in the UK for inciting racial hatred in 1999 and 2000 for a British National Party (BNP) election leaflet, and again in the UK between 2008 and 2011 for publishing material on the Internet that was in breach of racial hatred legislation, after having been subject to a number of raids by police. He was released on licence after serving less than half his sentence to a bail hostel on 17 May 2011 and was banned from accessing the Internet. He was rearrested in January 2013 for breach of his licence conditions and returned to prison in Northallerton. He was imprisoned again in 2022, this time for sexual offences involving minors.

== Career and work ==
Sheppard initially had a career as a recording engineer in the music industry and claims to have met famous figures like Robert Fripp and even Andy Warhol. He then set up his own company, the Heretical Press, to distribute his self-published books.

The Heretical Press website at heretical.com contains an eclectic mixture of excerpts taken from Sheppard's books, stand-alone articles by Sheppard, work by his associate Steven Whittle (using the pen name Luke O'Farrell), and many pieces of work by other writers whose work fits with Sheppard's ideas, along with miscellaneous entries. Subjects mentioned on the site include Sheppard's theories such as his own "Procedural Analysis" concept, racial theories and stereotyping, Holocaust denial and general antisemitism, the inferiority of women and opposition to women's rights and feminism, the science behind sexual intercourse and its biological implications, and accounts of cannibalism around the world, among other topics. Despite lacking relevant qualifications or membership of the British Psychological Society, Sheppard presents himself as a psychologist and attempts to apply game theory and evolutionary psychology to the analysis of biological competition between the sexes and between different races, in a social Darwinistic sense. One notable aspect of his theories is that he claims that it is the male instinct to be racist, because this has evolved as an evolutionary drive to try to prevent females, who are evolutionarily inclined to view alien males as having high biological fitness as they have penetrated a territory without being killed, from engaging in miscegenation with males of other races, which would be genetically disadvantageous to the males as a group.

Sheppard used the pseudonym "Thomas Sparks" to apply his anti-semitism to Christianity, by producing works that support pre-Vatican II Catholicism and call for the Catholic Church to return to its policies of discriminating against Jews and banishing them from Christian society. Sheppard's identity was confirmed when an anti-racist Catholic group in the UK did online research that showed that Sparks' internet ID number was the same Hull, UK-based one as Sheppard's.

One of his books, The Tyranny of Ambiguity, details his life in Amsterdam in the early 1990s and his interactions with other people, and his attempts to view the events in the book in terms of his own personal theories of psychology. Another of his books, All About Women, identifies Sheppard's self-created concept of "Big Sister" (analogous with Orwell's concept of Big Brother) as consisting of all groups within society that express "female characteristics" such as being dishonest, to conspire, and to manipulate, and that such groups include women, non-Whites, and Jews.

Sheppard was also the host of Redwatch, a site used by far right activists that publishes photographs, names, addresses and telephone numbers of anti-racist campaigners from across the political spectrum. Redwatch also contained a section called "Noncewatch" (nonce being English slang for a paedophile) containing details of individuals, including politicians and political activists, whom the site accused of paedophilia. Mark Collett gave Sheppard work at his Nazi-supporting online Heritage & Destiny website until Sheppard's pedophilic activities came to light, and has not used his work or mentioned him since his arrest and conviction on sex offense charges.

== Criminal convictions and imprisonment ==
On 8 June 1999, Sheppard and David Hannam were arrested in Hull for distributing racist election literature on behalf of the British National Party. He was expelled from the BNP the same day (though Hannam was not and remained a senior administrator in the party until his death in October 2011 at the age of 30). On 14 June 2000, Sheppard was convicted at Kingston upon Hull Crown Court of publishing or distributing racially inflammatory material. According to his website, Sheppard has been banned from every public library in Hull, Hull University and Hull College.

In 2004, a complaint had been made regarding an anti-Semitic comic book called Tales of the Holohoax (the script of which was written by Michael A. Hoffman II) after it was pushed through the door of a synagogue in Blackpool, Lancashire. Subsequently, it was traced back to a post office box in Hull registered to Sheppard. Holocaust denier Mark Weber was asked to write an analysis for the court hearing regarding this publication.

In 2005, Sheppard's house was raided by police following complaints about allegedly racist material published by his Heretical Press.

In 2008, Sheppard was arrested in the UK, from the investigation that started in 2004, and charged with using his website to circulate "material likely to incite racial hatred". The website is based in Torrance, California, so Sheppard rejects English legal jurisdiction over the published writings. Sheppard and his associate Steven Whittle absconded from bail, took a ferry to Ireland, and flew to Los Angeles, USA. After they demanded political asylum, the pair were put into Santa Ana Jail.

On 24 March 2009, the two appellants addressed the California court themselves before Judge Rose Peters. According to the neo-Nazi website Lasha Darkmoon, the two men claimed that their actions in England were legal because they were based upon the Edict of Expulsion of 1290 when England expelled all Jews living in the country at the time, and the two said that since the edict has never been repealed (like all royal decrees, it could only be cancelled by a living king or queen of England), their anti-semitism was backed by British law and they were eligible for asylum due to being persecuted for their beliefs. On 5 April 2009, with reasons reserved, Sheppard and Whittle were denied asylum, upon which the former stated that they would not appeal, and they were deported and returned to prison in the United Kingdom on 17 June 2009. On 10 July 2009, Sheppard was sentenced to 4 years and 10 months in prison, and his co-defendant, Whittle, was convicted of five similar offences. These sentences for publishing material on the Internet were described as "groundbreaking" by Adil Khan, representing Humberside police, whilst Sheppard's lawyer, Adrian Davies, said in his defence during the trial that he had come from a "very troubled background" and revealed that his mother had committed suicide, whilst noting that Sheppard was an intelligent man who had problems with authority, especially the police. In January 2010, Sheppard and Whittle lost an appeal against their convictions, but succeeded in having their sentences reduced slightly.

Sheppard was arrested again on 25 January 2013 for breaching his licence conditions. The breach related to an article entitled "Spree Killers" from the Heritage and Destiny publication. Sheppard was returned to prison for a further three months. In June 2018, Sheppard was convicted of racist harassment of a neighbour. He was sentenced to nine months in prison and given a five-year Criminal Behaviour Order.

In February 2022, Sheppard was convicted of propositioning four 14-year-old girls for sex. He was convicted of eight offences involving attempting to engage in sexual communication with a child and inciting the sexual exploitation of children. He was subsequently sentenced to a prison term of 3 years and 9 months, and will have to register as a sex offender in the UK for the rest of his life.

== Bibliography ==
- Sex and Power: A Manual on Male-Female Relations
- All About Women: What Big Sister Doesn't Want You to Know
- Anne Frank's Novel: The Diary is a Fraud
- The Tyranny of Ambiguity: An Account of the Development of a System of Human Behaviour Analysis Called Procedural Analysis
