= Eddy Morrison =

British neo-Nazi political activist (1949–2020)

Eddy Morrison (16 July 1949 – 10 June 2020) was a British neo-Nazi political activist, who was involved in a number of movements throughout his career.

== Biography ==
Morrison was involved in the British Movement (BM) and also the National Front (NF) during the 1970s (he published two newsletters, both called British News, during the period; the first supported the BM and the second, for a time, the NF), as well as briefly organising a militant group called the British National Party (unrelated to the current incarnation) in his Leeds base. Soon, however, he became associated with John Tyndall and followed him into the New National Front (NNF) in 1979 and from there into the newly formed British National Party (BNP) in 1982. Morrison appeared in an ITV World in Action television documentary about the NF and the BNP in 1978.

After leaving the BNP Morrison joined the notoriously violent National Democratic Freedom Movement (a minor group which ended when its founder, David Myatt, was jailed) before setting up his own group, the National Action Party, in the early 1980s with Kevin Randall. The NAP was a small group and Tony Malski (now disappeared from the political scene) claimed that Morrison was out of his depth and had sought to merge the NAP into his own party. Morrison was readmitted to the BNP in 1988 and became regional organizer for Yorkshire, revitalising the party right across the North of England, especially when he organised the now notorious Dewsbury open air mass rally which is credited by many observers with putting the BNP on the map.

Morrison returned to the NF in the late 1990s, rebuilding the local party group in Yorkshire after years of decline. However, the NF leadership soon became distrustful of the power base Morrison was building up. In 2002, he formed the White Nationalist Party and became one of its leading members until yet another split occurred and he again broke away with his followers. This time Morrison formed the Spearhead Support Group (soon shortened to Spearhead Group) and again linked up with Tyndall to support his attempts to regain leadership of the BNP from Nick Griffin. When progress was not made, Morrison suggested to Tyndall that he give up on the BNP altogether and form his own party, but Tyndall was not ready. After enduring a torrid few months as leader of the Nationalist Alliance (NA), Morrison, along with John Graeme Wood, left the NA and reconstituted their followers as the British People's Party. Under the BPP banner Morrison ran in the 2006 local elections in the Bramley and Stanningley ward of Leeds, securing 135 votes (2.7%) to finish last in a field of six candidates. In 2007, he advocated support for the BNP though "he objected to the induction of non-whites" in that party. He rejoined the NF and was editor of the NF News from 2009 to 2010.

Morrison published his autobiography Memoirs of a Street Soldier in 2003. He also wrote self-published poetry, much of his work dealing with nationalist themes and some of a more general nature, and had two blogs.

Morrison died on 10 June 2020, at the age of 70, after tripping and falling down the stairs at his home. He broke his neck and died instantly, though his body was not found until the next day.
