= November 9th Society =

British neo-Nazi organisation

- Leader: Kevin Quinn
- Founder: Terry Flynn
- Founded: 1977; 49 years ago
- Ideology: Neo-Nazism; White supremacy White nationalism Antisemitism; Anti-communism; Homophobia; Opposition to abortion Anti-immigrant nativism Nationalization
- Political position: Far-right
- International affiliation: World Union of National Socialists
- Colours: Red, white and black

Party flag

The November 9th Society (also known as the British First Party or N9S) is a British neo-Nazi group, formed in 1977 by Terry Flynn. The 9th of November has been a pivotal date in German history on several occasions: the execution of the liberal leader Robert Blum which effectively ended the German revolutions in 1848; the abdication of Wilhelm II, German Emperor and the end of the German Empire in 1918; the failed Nazi Beer Hall Putsch in 1923; and the beginning of Kristallnacht in 1938.

== History ==
Under Flynn's leadership, N9S functioned as a pressure group, but under the leadership of Kevin Quinn, the group has taken a more active role in British politics. Under the name British First Party, the group ran two candidates in the May 2007 UK local elections in Sunderland. In St Anne's ward, the BFP candidate received 257 votes of 2,293 votes in total, finishing ahead of the Liberal Democrats and three votes behind the British National Party (BNP). In Redhill ward, the BFP candidate received 78 out of 2,540 votes cast.

N9S has had sporadic activity since inception, and Searchlight magazine claims the group had 120 members although the numbers are deemed far lower due to the forming of the British First Party causing a split between members. They produce the magazine Britain Awake, and previously had a blog on their website. On 17 December 2005 and 20 March 2006, they were involved demonstrations outside the Austrian embassy in support of David Irving, who was awaiting trial in Austria for Holocaust denial and was subsequently jailed for three years. They took part in a similar demonstration on 20 December 2006, the day of Irving's early release. At one point, N9S had a youth leader (an ex-football hooligan) and regional leaders who operated in groups to distribute leaflets.

The group prided itself on strong security, and members were encouraged not to reveal their real identities online. However, the anonymity of several members was compromised in February 2006 when the group became the subject of an undercover investigation by a reporter from British tabloid newspaper Sunday Mirror. The paper reported that a reporter had infiltrated the group and filmed several members, including Quinn, verbally abusing Jewish people in the street, boasting of having committed violent attacks, and making overtly racist jokes. Quinn claimed that these were outright lies. In November 2006, the Jewish Chronicle published an exposé of the society, alleging among other things, that the members wear Nazi regalia in private, and are attempting to recruit youths.

The party formed a political party under the name British First Party. The N9S's slogan of "We will never change to flirt with public opinion" came to an end when the BFP was introduced, and many other right wing parties turned their back on the N9S/BFP ever being a serious contender in British politics. Its UK core members wear an identifying silver 'fraternity' ring among their regalia. It was renamed back to November 9th Society in November 2007.

== Platform ==
The society campaigns against non-white immigration, abortion, communism, foreign aid, and homosexuality. It promotes a hierarchical system of leadership, repatriation, Holocaust denial, and British ownership of industry; with all banking controlled by a central government bank and all media outlets becoming nationalised. N9S members are critical of the BNP, whom they view as too moderate, even dubbing them 'Conservatives on steroids'.

The party states that its name comes from the date in 1923 when 16 Nazis lost their lives at Feldherrnhalle as part of the Beer Hall Putsch. Opponents have argued that the name is actually based on the Kristallnacht in 1938, and that N9S is merely a force for anti-Semitism. Party members deny such criticism but do cite Israel as the cause of Islamic violence in Britain whilst also condemning "Jewish bankers".
