= British People's Party (2005) =

2005–2013 British neo-Nazi political party

- Abbreviation: BPP
- Leader: Kevin Watmough
- Founders: Kevin Watmough; Eddy Morrison; John Graeme Wood; Sid Williamson
- Founded: 18 September 2005
- Dissolved: 25 July 2013
- Headquarters: BM Box 5581, London WC1N 3XX
- Ideology: British fascism; Neo-Nazism; Euroscepticism; Ulster loyalism; White nationalism
- Political position: Far-right
- International affiliation: World Union of National Socialists
- Colours: Black White Red

Party flag

The British People's Party (BPP) was a neo-Nazi political party in the United Kingdom, launched in 2005 by Kevin Watmough, Eddy Morrison, John G. Wood and Sid Williamson, former members of Combat 18, British National Party (BNP), National Front (NF) and the White Nationalist Party, as a splinter group from the Nationalist Alliance. Its founding member Eddy Morrison left the BPP and joined the NF in 2009. The party dissolved in 2013.

== Platform ==
The party was committed to a number of ideals including the implementation of the "Fourteen Words", and the expulsion of non-whites and Jews. It also expressed support for loyalism in Northern Ireland. The BPP described its economic policies as establishing a "White Workers' State" as an alternative to Marxism and capitalism and favoured nationalising the media and banks, supporting small businesses, while dismantling multinational ones, and recriminalising homosexuality. The BPP also denied the Holocaust.

== History ==
The BPP was led by Kevin Watmough and was largely dedicated to the legacies of British Nazis who pre-date the party, such as Arnold Leese, John Beckett and Colin Jordan. On 27 October 2005, the party officially registered with the Electoral Commission as BPP – Putting Britons First. The BPP initially had two publications: Vanguard, which came out every month, and Imperium, a quarterly magazine that was more theoretical. Both have ceased publication. On 17 October 2005, the BPP was proscribed to members of the BNP.

The BPP stood a small number of candidates in the May 2006 council elections without winning any seats. The party did not contest the following year's elections as they claimed to have declared a 'truce' with the BNP but continued to oppose the BNP for its rejection of Nazism. The BPP was also critical of the British First Party for what it claimed was that group's attempts to conceal its Nazism and behave as a 'populist' party.

Goole party member Martyn Gilleard was convicted in June 2008 of possessing child pornography, illegal weapons and explosive devices. Gilleard was sentenced to 13 years in prison and has since reportedly converted to Islam. When police searched his house they found 39,000 indecent images of children and an arsenal of weapons, bombs and far-right literature. He was expelled from the BPP when the police revealed he had also been arrested for possession of child pornography.

The party supported Simon Sheppard during his arrest, trial and imprisonment on incitement to racial hatred charges for material on his Heretical Press site.

The group attempted to expand into Northern Ireland under the name of the Ulster British People's Party. It undertook leafleting campaigns in support of a return of the shoot-to-kill policy and against the presence of Roma people in the Village area of south Belfast. A further campaign against Polish immigration was condemned by the Democratic Unionist Party MP Gregory Campbell, who called for a crackdown on the BPP in Northern Ireland. Although the BPP website avowedly stated that it supported Northern Ireland's continuing status within the UK, it also offered coverage to Ulster Nation, a pro-independence journal.

The only BPP member to have stood for election was David Jones (who was the former BPP Commissioner) who three years running contested the Todmorden ward of Calderdale Council, in West Yorkshire, where he is a resident. In May 2010, he received 283 votes (5.0%) of the poll, in May 2011, 203 votes (5.5%) and in May 2012, 257 votes (8.5%). According to the party's website, Jones was expelled from the BPP, over allegations of bringing them into disrepute, a week before the 2012 election.

The party was "voluntarily deregistered" with the Electoral Commission on 25 July 2013. Watmough dissolved the party and called on all members and supporters to give their support to the National Front which he believes can create a viable white working class backlash in the United Kingdom.

== Membership ==
The party's annual reports to the Electoral Commission did not give membership figures, but membership appeared to be in decline. The latest (2010) report stated that annual membership cost £10 and life membership £35. Income from membership was given as £780, suggesting a minimum of 23 and a maximum of 78 members. Membership receipts were quoted as £920 in 2009, a maximum of 92 members. Prior to 2009, there was a single category of membership at £5 per annum. In 2008, membership receipts were £1170, suggesting 234 members. Similarly, in 2007 there were 315 members and 262 in 2006.
