= List of neo-Nazi organizations =

The following is a list of organizations, both active and defunct, whose ideological beliefs are categorized as neo-Nazism. This includes political parties, terrorist cells/networks, radical paramilitary groups, criminal gangs, social clubs, organized crime syndicates, websites, internet forums, football hooligan firms, religious sects, and other organizations alike.

Various white power skinhead groups as well as select factions of the Ku Klux Klan are listed only if they espouse neo-Nazi ideals as a whole.

This list does not include pre-1945 organizations founded either before or during World War II; "neo-Nazi" literally means "new Nazi".

Additionally, this list does not include musical artists, record labels or music festivals associated with the neo-Nazi movement.

== Africa ==
=== Rhodesia (Zimbabwe) ===
Organization		Translation	Ref.
NSDAP	Rhodesian White People's Party	N/A	

=== South Africa ===
Organization		Translation	Ref.
Afrikaner-Weerstandsbeweging	Afrikaner Weerstandsbeweging	Afrikaner Resistance Movement	
Order of Flemish Militants	Afrikaner Studentebond	Afrikaner Student Federation	
	Blanke Bevrydingsbeweging	White Liberation Movement	
	Boeremag	Boer Power	
	Boere Weerstandsbeweging	Boer Resistance Movement	

== The Americas ==
=== North America ===
==== Canada ====
Organization	Translation	Ref.
Aryan Guard	N/A	
Aryan Nations	N/A	
Black Shirts Gang	N/A	
Canadian Nazi Party	N/A	
Heritage Front	N/A	
National Socialist Party of Canada	N/A	
Northern Order	N/A	
Tri-City Skins	N/A	
White Boy Posse	N/A	

==== Mexico ====
Organization		Translation	Ref.
Ibero-American Front	Frente Iberoamericano	Ibero-American Front	
	Frente Nacionalista de México	Nationalist Front of Mexico	
	Partido Nacional Socialista de México	Mexico National Socialist Party	
White Vision	Visión Blanca	White Vision	

==== United States ====
Organization		Years Active	Ref.
	American Front	1984–present	
	American Nazi Party	1959–present	
Anti-Communist Action 1	Anti-Communist Action	2016–present	
	Aryan Brotherhood of Texas	1981–present	
	Aryan Brotherhood	1964–present	
	Aryan Circle	1985–present	
	Aryan Freedom Network	2018–present	
	Aryan Nations	1964–disputed	
	Aryan People's Republic	1999–2004	
	Aryan Republican Army	1992–1996	
	Atlantic Youth Club	2025–present	
	Battalion 14/Connecticut White Wolves	2002–2011	
	Blood Tribe	2020–present	
	Endangered Souls RC/Crew 519	2010–present	
	Goyim Defense League	2018–present	
	Identity Evropa	2016–2020	
Ku Klux Klan	Imperial Klans of America	1996–present	
	Kalifornian Nationalist Youth	2024–present	
	Keystone United	2001–present	
	Libertarian National Socialist Green Party	2002–2011	
	Loyal White Knights of the Ku Klux Klan	2012–present	
	Maryland National Socialist Party	2011–2014	
National Alliance 01	National Alliance	1974–present	
	National Renaissance Party	1949–1981	
	National Socialist Alliance of Oklahoma	1995–1996	
	National Socialist Kindred	1980–1995	
	National Socialist League	1974–1984	
	National Socialist Liberation Front	1974–1986	
	National Socialist Movement	1975–present	
	National Socialist Party of America	1970–1981	
	National Socialist Vanguard	1983–2006	
	National States' Rights Party	1958–1987	
National Vanguard 02	National Vanguard	2005–2007	
National Front	Nationalist Front	2016–2018	
	Nationalist Social Club	2019–present	
	Nazi Lowriders	1978–present	
	NSDAP/AO	1972–present	
	Patriot Front	2017–present	
	Renegade Tribune	2012–present	
	Rise Above Movement	2016–2020	
	Soldiers of Aryan Culture	1997–present	
	Tempel ov Blood	2014–present	
	The Right Stuff	2012–present	
	The Order	1983–1984	
	Traditionalist Worker Party	2013–2018	
	United Nordic Confederation	1957–1959	
	Universal Aryan Brotherhood	1993–present	
	Vanguard America	2015–2018	
	Vanguard News Network	2000–present	
	Werewolf 88	N/A	
	White Aryan Resistance	N/A	
	White Devil Social Club	1998–2005	
	White Order of Thule	1995–2000	
	White Patriot Party	1980–1987	
	White Revolution	2002–2011	

=== Caribbean and South America ===
==== Argentina ====
Organization		Translation	Ref.
	Dignidad Popular	Popular Dignity	
National Socialist Argentine Front	Frente Nacional Socialista Argentino	Argentine National Socialist Front	
	Frente Patriota	Patriot Front	
Tacuara Nationalist Movement	Movimiento Nacionalista Tacuara	Tacuara Nationalist Movement	
	New Triumph Party	New Triumph Party	
	Unión de Estudiantes Nacionalistas Secundarios		

==== Brazil ====
Organization		Translation	Ref.
	Brazilian National Socialist Party	N/A	
	Partido Nacionalista Revolucionário Brasileiro	Brazilian Revolutionary Nationalist Party	
São Paulo Neo-Nazi Movement	Carecas do ABC	ABC Region Skinheads	
	Ciudad Libertad de Opinión	Freedom of Opinion City	
	Impacto Hooligan		
	Imperial Klans of Brazil	N/A	
	Neuland	New Land	.
	Partido Nacional-Socialista dos Trabalhadores Brasileiros	National Socialist Brazilian Workers' Party	
	Soberanos da Revolução		
	Valhalla88	N/A	

==== Chile ====
Organization		Translation	Ref.
Hispanic National Socialist Front - Chilean Division	Frente Orden Nacional	National Order Front	
	La Vanguardia (Chile)	The Vanguard (Chile)	
Hispanic National Socialist Front	Movimiento Nacional Socialista de los Trabajadores Chilenos	National Socialist Movement of Chilean Workers	
	Movimiento Revolucionario Nacional Sindicalista	National Revolutionary Syndicalist Movement	
	Social Patriot Movement	Social Patriot Movement	
NSDAP	Partido Nacional Socialista Obrero de Chile	National Socialist Workers' Party of Chile	
New Fatherland Society	Patria Nueva Sociedad	New Fatherland Society	

==== Colombia ====
Organization	Translation	Ref.
Movimiento Latino Nacional	National Latin Movement	
Tercera Fuerza	Third Force	

==== Costa Rica ====
Organization	Translation	Ref.
Partido Nacional Socialista de Costa Rica	National Socialist Party of Costa Rica	
Sociedad Costa Rica de la Lanza Hiperbórea	Costa Rica Society of the Hyperborean Spear	

==== Ecuador ====
Organization		Translation	Ref.
	Legión Blanca	White Legion	
Ecuadorian National Socialism	Nacional Socialismo Ecuatoriano	Ecuadorian National Socialism	

==== Paraguay ====
Organization		Translation	Ref.
National Vanguard	Partido Nacional Socialista Paraguayo	Paraguayan National Socialist Party	

==== Peru ====
Organization	Translation	Ref.
Andean Peru National Socialism Movement	N/A	
Movimiento Nacional Socialista Despierta Perú	National Socialist Movement Awake Peru	
Tercios Nacional Socialista de Nueva Castilla	National Socialist Tercios of Nueva Castilla	

==== Uruguay ====
Organization	Translation	Ref.
Movimiento Joseph Goebbels	Joseph Goebbels Movement	
Orgullo Skinhead	Skinhead Pride	
Frente Nacional Revolucionario del Uruguay	National Revolutionary Front of Uruguay	
Poder Blanco	White Power	

==== Venezuela ====
Organization	Translation	Ref.
New Order (Venezuela)	New Order (Venezuela)	
Partido Nacional Socialista Venezolano	Venezuelan National Socialist Party	

== Asia ==
=== Japan ===
Organization	Translation	Ref.
国家社会主義日本労働者党	National Socialist Japanese Workers' Party	

=== Iran ===
Organization	Translation	Ref.
Azure Party	Azure Party	
NASKA Party	Iran National Socialist Workers Party	
SUMKA	National Socialist Workers Party of Iran	

=== Iraq ===
Organization	Translation	Ref.
Hawpa	Kurdish National Socialist Party	

=== Israel ===
Organization	Translation	Ref.
Патруль 36	Patrol 36	

=== Malaysia ===
Organization	Translation	Ref.
Darah & Maruah Tanah Melayu	Blood & Honour of the Malay Land	

=== Mongolia ===
Organization	Translation	Ref.
Mongolian National Union		
Tsagaan Khas	White Swastika	

=== Taiwan ===
Organization	Translation	Ref.
國家社會主義學會	National Socialism Association	

=== Turkey ===
Organization	Translation	Ref.
Ataman Kardeşliği	Ataman Brotherhood	
Nasyonal Aktivite ve Zinde İnkişaf	National Activity and Vigorous Development	
Ulusal Cephe Partisi	National Front Party	

== Europe ==
Organization	Description	Ref.
Blood and Honour	Founded in England but with international presence and banned in Germany, Russia and some other European countries.	
European Liberation Front		
European White Knights of the Burning Cross	Previously headquartered in Germany before relocating to England. Has additional chapters in Sweden, France, Austria, Switzerland and Italy.	

=== Albania ===
Organization		Translation	Ref.
	Brerore	Aureole	
Albanian Third Position	Pozicioni i Tretë Shqiptar	Albanian Third Position	

=== Armenia ===
Organization		Translation	Ref.
Hosank	Հոսանք	Hosank	

=== Austria ===
Organization	Translation	Ref.
Alpen-Donau.info		
Nationaldemokratische Partei	National Democratic Party	
Objekt 21		
Volkstreue außerparlamentarische Opposition		

=== Belgium and the Netherlands ===
Organization		Translation	Country	Ref.
	Bloed, Bodem, Eer en Trouw	Blood, Soil, Honour and Loyalty	Flanders	
	Blood and Honour Vlaanderen	Blood and Honour Flanders	Belgium	
	Centrumpartij '86	Centre Party '86	Netherlands	
	L'Assaut (organisation)	The Assault	Belgium	
	Nationaal Europese Sociale Beweging	National European Social Movement	Netherlands	
	Nationale Alliantie	National Alliance	Netherlands	
	Nederlandse Volks-Unie	Dutch People's Union	Netherlands	
	Racial Volunteer Force	N/A	Belgium and the Netherlands	
Order of Flemish Militants	Vlaamse Militanten Orde	Order of Flemish Militants	Flanders	

=== Bosnia and Herzegovina ===
Organization	Translation	Ref.
Bosanski pokret nacionalnog ponosa	Bosnian Movement of National Pride	

=== Bulgaria ===
Organization	Translation	Ref.
Бял фронт	White Front	

=== Croatia ===
Organization	Translation	Ref.
Autochthonous Croatian Party of Rights	Autochthonous Croatian Party of Rights	

=== Czech Republic ===
Organization	Translation	Ref.
Dělnická strana	Workers' Party	
Dělnická strana sociální spravedlnosti	Workers' Party of Social Justice	

=== Denmark ===
Organization		Translation	Ref.
National Socialist Movement of Denmark	Danmarks Nationalsocialistiske Bevægelse	National Socialist Movement of Denmark	
	Dansk Front	Danish Front	
Nordic Resistance Movement	Den nordiske modstandsbevægelse	Nordic Resistance Movement	
	Danskernes Parti	Party of the Danes/the Danes' Party	

=== Estonia ===
Organization	Translation	Ref.
Estland88	Estonia88	
Feuerkrieg Division	Fire War Division	
Eesti Iseseisvuspartei	Estonian Independence Party	

=== Finland ===
Organization		Translation	Ref.
	Arjalaiset Kansakunnat	Aryan Nations	
	Atomwaffen Division Finland "Siitoin Squadron"	N/A	
	Arjalaisen Veren Liitto	Union of Aryan Blood	
	Blood & Honour Finland	N/A	
	Combat 18 Finland	N/A	
	Crew 38	N/A	
	Suomen Kansallisrintama	Finnish National Front	
	Suomi – Isänmaa	Finland – Fatherland	
Nordic Resistance Movement	Pohjoismainen Vastarintaliike	Nordic Resistance Movement	
	Kohti Vapautta!	Towards Freedom!	
	Musta Sydän	Black Heart	
	Turun Hengentieteen Seura	Turku Society for the Spiritual Sciences	
IKR	Isänmaallinen Kansanrintama	Patriotic Popular Front	
	Kansallis-Demokraattinen Puolue	National Democratic Party	
	Kansallinen Liittoneuvosto	National Union Council	
	Odinin sotilaat	Soldiers of Odin	
	Veren Laki	Law of Blood	

=== France ===
Organization	Translation	Ref.
Devenir européen	Becoming European	
Combat 18 France	N/A	
Groupe Union Défense	Defense Union Group	
Parti Nationaliste Français et Européen	French and European Nationalist Party	
Fédération d'action nationale et européenne	Federation of National and European Action	
L'Œuvre	The Work	
Nomad 88	N/A	
Strasbourg Offender	N/A	
White Wolf Klan	N/A	
Zouaves Paris	N/A	

=== Germany ===
Organization		Translation	Ref.
	Aktion Sauberes Deutschland	Clean Germany Initiative	
	Aktionsbündnis Mittelhessen	Action Alliance middle Hesse	
	Aktionsbüro Mittelrhein	Middle Rhine Action Office	
Action Front of National Socialists-National Activists	Aktionsfront Nationaler Sozialisten/Nationale Aktivisten	Action Front of National Socialists/National Activists	
	ANSDAPO	Alternative National Strausberger DArt-, Piercing and Tattoo Offensive	
	Aryan Circle Germany	N/A	
	Aryan Defense Jail Crew	N/A	
	Atomwaffen Division Deutschland	Atomic Weapons Germany	
	Autonome Nationalisten	Autonomous Nationalists	
	Artgemeinschaft	Racial Community	
	Besseres Hannover	Better Hanover	
	Bewegung Neue Ordnung	New Order Movement	
	Blood & Honour Deutschland	Blood & Honour Germany	
	Bund Deutscher Nationalsozialisten	League of German National Socialists	
	Burschenschaft Normannia Jena	Student League Normanns Jena	
	Calenberger Bande	Calenberger Gang	
	Club 88	N/A	
	Collegium Humanum		
	Combat 18 Deutschland	Combat 18 Germany	
	Combat 18 Pinneberg	N/A	
	Deutsche Aktionsgruppen	German Groups of Action	
	Deutsche Arbeiter Jugend	German Worker Youth	
	Deutsche Heidnische Front	German Heathens' Front	
III. Path	Der Dritte Weg	The Third Way	
	Deutsches Rechtsbüro	German Bureau of Rights	
	Die Rechte	The Right	
	Die Zeitberichter		
	Freiheitliche Deutsche Arbeiterpartei	Free German Workers' Party	
	Frankfurter Brettl	Frankfurts little board	
	Freie Kräfte Schwalm-Eder	Free Forces of Schwalm-Eder	
	Freies Netz Hessen	Free Network Hesse	
	Freies Netz Süd	Free Network South	
	Frontbann 24		
	Deutsch-Soziale Union	German Social Union	
	Deutsche Alternative	German Alternative	
	Deutsches Kolleg	German colleague	
	Freie Kameradschaften	Free Fellowships	
	Freie Kameradschaft Dresden	Free Fellowship Dresde	
	Freundeskreis Freiheit für Deutschland	Clique for Freedom For germany	
	Freundeskreis Rade	Clique Radevormwald	
	FSN (Medienportal)	Free-Social-National Media	
	Gefangenenhilfe (rechtsextreme Organisation)	Prisoner-Aid	
	Gesellschaft für biologische Anthropologie, Eugenik und Verhaltensforschung	Society for biological anthropology, eugenics and behavioural science	
	Gesinnungsgemeinschaft der Neuen Front	Community of thought of the New Front	
	Heimattreue Deutsche Jugend	German Youth of loyality towards the Homeland	
	Hepp-Kexel-Gruppe	Hepp-Kexel-Group	
	Hilfsorganisation für nationale politische Gefangene und deren Angehörige	Organisation for helping national political prisoners and their families	
	HooNaRa	Hooligans-Nazis-Racists	
	Jagdstaffel D.S.T.	Fighter Squadron G.P.L.	
	Junge Landsmannschaft Ostdeutschland	Young Homeland Association of East Germany	
	Junge Nationalisten	Young Nationalists	
	Kameradschaft Hauptvolk	Comradeship Main-People	
	Kameradschaft Süd	Comradeship South	
	Kameradschaft Tor	Comradeship Gate	
	Kameradschaft Walter Spangenberg	Comradeship Walter Spangenberg	
	Kampfbund Deutscher Soldaten	Combat League of German Soilders	
	Kampfbund Deutscher Sozialisten	Combat League of German Socialists	
	Kampfgruppe Priem	Combat Group Priem	
	Komitee zur Vorbereitung der Feierlichkeiten zum 100. Geburtstag Adolf Hitlers	Committee for the preparations of the party at the 100. birthday of Adolf Hitler	
	Ku-Klux-Klan West Germany	N/A	
	National Socialist Knights of the Ku Klux Klan Deutschland	National Socialist Knights of the Ku Klux Klan Germany	
	Nationaldemokratische Partei Deutschlands	National Democratic Party of Germany	
	Nationale Alternative	National Alternative	
	Nationale Deutsche Befreiungsbewegung	National german Liberation Movement	
	Nationale Sammlung (Deutschland)	National Collection (Germany)	
	Nationale Sozialisten Chemnitz	National Socialists Chemnitz	
	Nationaler Widerstand Dortmund	National Resistance Dortmund	
	Nationaler Widerstand	National Resistance	
	Nationales und Soziales Aktionsbündnis Mitteldeutschland	National and Social Action Alliance of middle-Germany	
	Nationales und Soziales Aktionsbündnis Norddeutschland	National and Social Action Alliance of Northern Germany	
	Nationalistische Front	Nationalist Front	
	Nationale Offensive	National Offensive	
	Nationalsozialistische Kampfgruppe Großdeutschland		
	Nationalsozialistischer Untergrund	National Socialist Underground	
	Naumann-Kreis	Naumann Circle	
	NSU 2.0	National Socialist Underground 2.0	
	Neue Ordnung	New Order	
	Nordadler	Northern Eagles	
	Nordkreuz	Northern Cross	
	Oldschool Society	N/A	
	Reichsjugend	Reich Youth	
	Revolution Chemnitz	N/A	
	Schutzgruppe (terroristische Vereinigung)	Group for Protection	
	Skinheads Sächsische Schweiz	Skinheads Saxonian Swiss	
Socialist Reich Party	Sozialistische Reichspartei Deutschlands	Socialist Reich Party	
	Sturm 27	Assault 27	
	Sturm 34	Assault 34	
	Turonen (Neonazi-Organisation)		
	Unsterbliche (Rechtsextremismus)	The Immortals (neo-Nazis)	
	Volk in Bewegung & Der Reichsbote	People in Movement & The Reich-Messanger	
	Widerstand West	Resistance West	
	Widerstand Süd	Resistance South	
	Wiking-Jugend	Viking-Youth	
	Vandalen – Ariogermanische Kampfgemeinschaft	Vandals – Aryan Germanic Combat Association	
	Volkssozialistische Bewegung Deutschlands/Partei der Arbeit	People's Socialist Movement of Germany/Labour Party	
	Wehrsportgruppe	Military Sports Group	
	Wehrsportgruppe Hengst	Military Sports Group Hengst	
	Wehrsportgruppe Rohwer	Military Sports Group Rohwer	
	White Youth	N/A	
	Widerstandsbewegung in Südbrandenburg	Resistance Movement in South Brandenburg	
	Wolfsbrigade 44	Wolfsbrigade 44	

=== Greece ===
Organization		Translation	Ref.
	Χρυσή Αυγή	Golden Dawn	
National Popular Consciousness	Εθνική Λαϊκή Συνείδηση	National Popular Consciousness	

=== Georgia ===
Organization	Translation	Ref.
Georgian National Unity	N/A	

=== Hungary ===
Organization		Translation	Ref.
	Erő és elszántság	Force and Determination	
Hungarian Hungarist Movement	Magyar Hungarista Mozgalom	Hungarian Hungarista Movement	
Hungarian Welfare Association	Magyar Népjóléti Szövetség	Hungarian Welfare Association	
	Hungarian National Front	Hungarian National Front	
	Pax Hungarica Movement	Pax Hungarica Movement	

=== Ireland ===
Organization	Translation	Ref.
Clann Éireann	Irish Family	
National Socialist Federation	N/A	
National Socialist Irish Workers Party	N/A	
National Socialist Union of Ireland	N/A	

=== Italy ===
Organization		Translation	Ref.
National Vanguard	Avanguardia Nazionale	National Avantgarde	
	Comunità Militante dei Dodici Raggi	Militant Community of the Twelve Rays	
	Partito Nazionalsocialista Italiano dei Lavoratori	National Socialist Italian Workers' Party	
	Milizia	Militia	
	Nuovo Ordine Sociale	New Social Order	
	Ordine Nuovo	New Order	
	Ordine Ario Romano	Roman Aryan Order	
	Ordine Nero	Black Order	
	Befreiungsausschuss Südtirol	South Tyrolean Liberation Committee	
	Veneto Fronte Skinheads	N/A	

=== Latvia ===
Organization	Translation	Ref.
Feuerkrieg Division	Fire War Division	

=== Lithuania ===
Organization	Translation	Ref.
Unified Lithuanian National Workers Movement	Lithuanian Alliance of Nationalist-Socialist Unity	
Feuerkrieg Division	Fire War Division	

=== Malta ===
Organization	Translation	Ref.
Imperium Europa	Empire of Europe	

=== Norway ===
Organization		Translation	Ref.
	Alliance (Norway)	Alliance – Alternative for Norway	
	Nordisk Styrka	Nordic Strength	
	Norges Germanske Armé	Norwegian Germanic Army	
	Norges Nasjonalsosialistiske Bevegelse	National Socialist Movement of Norway	
Nordic Resistance Movement	Nordiske motstandsbevegelsen/Nordiske motstandsrørsla	Nordic Resistance Movement	
	Norsk Front	Norwegian Front	
	Vigrid	N/A	
All-Germanic Heathens Front	Allgermanische Heidnische Front	All-Germanic Heathen Front	
	Boot Boys	N/A	

=== Poland ===
Organization		Translation	Ref.
	Bad Company	N/A	
	Duma i Nowoczesność	Pride and Modernity	
	Front Narodowo-Socjalistyczny	National Socialist Front	
	Front Narodowej Samoobrony	National Self-Defence Front	
National Revival of Poland	Narodowe Odrodzenie Polski	National Revival of Poland	
Oboz Narodowo Radykalny	Obóz Narodowo-Radykalny	National Radical Camp	
Stormtrooper	Szturmowcy	Stormtroopers	
	Stowarzyszenie Roty Niepodległości	Association of Independence Rota	
	Zadrużny Krąg	Comradely Circle	

=== Portugal ===
Organization	Translation	Ref.
Blood & Honour Portugal	Blood & Honour Portugal	
Grupo 1143	Group 1143	
Nova Ordem Social	New Social Order	
Portugal Hammerskins	N/A	

=== Russia ===
Organization		Translation	Ref.
	Atomwaffen Division Russland	Atomic Weapons Division Russia	
	Боевая организация русских националистов	Battle Organization of Russian Nationalists	
	Боевая террористическая организация	Combat Terrorist Organization	
Ethnic National Union	Этническое национальное объединение	Ethnic National Union	
	Эспаньола	Espanyola	
	Формат18	Format18	
Front of National Revolutionary Action	Фронт национал-революционного действия	Front of National Revolutionary Action	
	линкольн-88	Lincoln-88	
	National Socialism / White Power	N/A	
National Socialist Society 01	Национал-социалистическое общество	National Socialist Society	
NSDAP	Национал-социалистическая русская рабочая партия	National Socialist Russian Workers' Party	
	Общество Нави	Navi Society	
PNP	Narodnaya natsionalnaya partiya	People's National Party	
	РКЦ ИПХ	Russian Catacomb Church of True Orthodox Christians	
Russian Imperial Legion	Russkoe imperskoe dvizhenie	Russian Imperial Movement	
Russian National Unity	Russkoe natsionalnoe edinstvo	Russian National Unity	
Russian National Union	Russky Natsionalny Soyuz	Russian National Union	
Russian National Unity	Новое Русское национальное единство	New Russian National Unity	
	Русский образ	Russian Image	
	Russkaya Natsional'naya Sotsialisticheskaya Partiya	Russian National Socialist Party	
	Банда Рыно — Скачевского	Ryno-Skachevsky gang	
	Чистильщики	The Cleaners	
	Шульц-88	Schultz-88	
Slavic Union	Славянский союз	Slavic Union	
	United Brigade 88	N/A	
	Общество белых-88	White Society-88	
Russia	ДШРГ «Ратибор»	DShRG "Ratibor"	
DShRG Rusich	Rusich Group	DShRG "Rusich"	
	WotanJugend	Odin Youth	

=== Serbia ===
Organization	Translation	Ref.
Pokret Levijatan	Leviathan Movement	
Krv i čast	Blood & Honour	
Pokret 1389	1389 Movement	
Nacionalni stroj	National Alignment	
Rasonalisti	Rationalists	

=== Spain ===
Organization		Translation	Ref.
	Acción Nacional Revolucionaria	Revolutionary National Action	
	Acción Radical	Radical Action	
	Alianza Nacional	National Alliance	
	Alternativa Europea	European Alternative	
Autonomous Bases	Bases Autónomas	Autonomous Bases	
	Blood & Honour España	Blood & Honour Spain	
	Círculo de Estudios Indoeuropeos	Circle of Indo-European Studies	
Spanish Circle of Friends of Europe	Círculo Español de Amigos de Europa	Spanish Circle of Friends of Europe	
	Democracia Nacional	National Democracy	
	Devenir Europeo	European Becoming	
	División Azul	Blue Division	
	Estado Nacional Europeo	European Nation State	
	Frente Antisistema	Anti-Systemic Front	
	Hermandad Nacional Socialista Armagedón	Armageddon National Socialist Brotherhood	
	Hispania Verde	Green Hispania	
	Hogar Social Madrid	Social Home Hadrid	
	Lo Nuestro	Ours	
	Nación y Revolución	Nation and Revolution	
	Respuesta Estudiantil	Students' Counterattack	

=== Sweden ===
Organization		Translation	Ref.
	Anti-AFA	Anti-AntiFa	
	Ariska brödraskapet	Aryan Brotherhood (Sweden)	
	Fria nationalister	Free Nationalists	
	Göteborgs fria nationalister	Gothenburg's Free Nationalists	
	Konservativa Partiet	Conservative Party	
	Info-14	N/A	
	Legion Wasa		
National Youth	Nationell Ungdom	National Youth	
	Nationella Alliansen	National Alliance (Sweden)	
	Nationellt Motstånd	National Resistance	
Nationalsocialistiska Arbetarpartiet	Nationalsocialistisk front	National Socialist Front	
	Nordiska förbundet	The Nordic Confederation	
Nordic Reich Party	Nordiska rikspartiet	The Nordic Realm Party	
Nordic Resistance Movement	Nordiska motståndsrörelsen	Nordic Resistance Movement	
	Nordiska nationalsocialister	Nordic National Socialists	
	Nordland (tidning)	Northland (newspaper)	
	Nordland (tidskrift)	Northland (journal)	
	Storm (nazistisk tidskrift)	N/A	
Party of the Swedes	Svenskarnas parti	Party of the Swedes	
Swedish White Aryan Resistance Movement	Vitt Ariskt Motstånd	White Aryan Resistance	

=== Switzerland ===
Organization	Translation	Ref.
Junge Tat	Young Action	
Partei National Orientierter Schweizer	Swiss Nationalist Party	
Volkspartei der Schweiz	People's Party of Switzerland	

=== Slovakia ===
Organization		Translation	Ref.
	Ľudová strana naše Slovensko	People's Party Our Slovakia	
Slovak Togetherness	Slovenská pospolitosť – Národná strana	Slovak Togetherness – National Party	

=== United Kingdom ===
Organization		Translation	Ref.
	British Movement	N/A	
	British National Front	N/A	
	British People's Party	N/A	
	Column 88	N/A	
	Greater Britain Movement	N/A	
	International Third Position	N/A	
	League of St. George	N/A	
	Northern League	N/A	
	November 9th Society	N/A	
	National Action	N/A	
	National Labour Party (UK, 1957)	N/A	
	National Socialist Action Party	N/A	
	National Socialist Movement (1960s)	N/A	
	National Socialist Movement (1990s)	N/A	
	Patriotic Alternative	N/A	
	Sonnenkrieg Division	Sun War Division	
	NF Flag Group	N/A	
	Racial Volunteer Force	N/A	
	Scottish Dawn	N/A	
White Defense League	White Defence League	N/A	
	White Nationalist Party	N/A	
	White Wolves	N/A	

=== Ukraine ===
Organization		Translation	Ref.
	S14 (Ukrainian group)	S14	
	Ukrainian: Соціал-Національна Асамблея	Social-National Assembly	
Social-National Party of Ukraine	Ukrainian: Соціал-національна партія України	Social-National Party of Ukraine	
	Українська націонал-трудова партія	Ukrainian National Labor Party	

== Oceania ==
=== Australia ===
Organization		Translation	Ref.
	Australian Nationalist Movement	N/A	
	Antipodean Resistance	N/A	
	Aryan Girls	N/A	
	Australian National Socialist Party	N/A	
	Crew 38	N/A	
	Lads Society	N/A	
	National Action	N/A	
	National Socialist Network	N/A	
NSDAP	National Socialist Party of Australia	N/A	
	Patriotic Youth League	N/A	
	Southern Cross Hammerskins	N/A	
	United Patriots Front	N/A	

=== New Zealand ===
Organization	Translation	Ref.
Black Order of Pan Europa	N/A	
Fourth Reich	Fourth Realm	
National Socialist Party of New Zealand	N/A	
New Zealand National Front	N/A	
Right Wing Resistance	N/A	
Unit 88	N/A	

== International ==
Organization	Translation	Active in	Ref.
Aryan Strikeforce	N/A	Germany, Serbia, United Kingdom and the United States	
Atomwaffen Division	Atomic Weapons Division	United States, United Kingdom, Canada, Germany, Baltic States, Russia, Switzerland, Italy, Finland, Ireland and other European countries, as well as Argentina and Brazil	
The Base	N/A	Australia, Canada, Europe, South Africa and the United States	
The Black Order of Pan Europa	N/A	Australia, England, Ireland, New Zealand, and Scandinavia	
Blood & Honour	N/A	Australia, Austria, Belgium, Bulgaria, Canada, Chile, Croatia, Finland, France, Germany, Greece, Hungary, Italy, the Netherlands, New Zealand, Norway, Poland, Portugal, Serbia, Slovenia, Spain, Sweden, the United Kingdom and the United States	
Combat 18	N/A	Argentina, Australia, Austria, Belgium, Canada, Czech Republic, Denmark, France, Germany, Greece, Hungary, Italy, Ireland, Russia, Serbia, South Africa, Sweden, Ukraine, the United Kingdom and the United States	
Greenline Front	N/A	Argentina, Belarus, Chile, Germany, Italy, Poland, Russia, Serbia, Spain, Switzerland and Ukraine	
Hammerskins	N/A	Australia, Austria, Canada, France, Germany, Hungary, Italy, Luxembourg, New Zealand, Portugal, Spain, Sweden, Switzerland, the United Kingdom and the United States	
New European Order		Europe-wide	
Order of Nine Angles		Australia, Brazil, Egypt, Finland, Greece, Ireland, Italy, Montenegro, Portugal, Poland, Russia, Serbia, South Africa, Spain, the United Kingdom, Argentina and the United States	
Sadistic Souls Motorcycle Club	N/A	Australia, New Zealand, United Kingdom and the United States	
Volksfront	People's Front	Australia, Canada, Germany, the Netherlands, Spain, the United Kingdom and the United States	
Terrorgram	N/A	Internet-based (online web forum)	
V7-Versand	V7 Shipping	Internet mail-order company for neo-Nazi paraphernalia.	
Women for Aryan Unity (WAU14)	N/A	Argentina, Canada, Italy, Spain and the United States	
World Union of National Socialists	N/A	Argentina, Belarus, Belgium, Bolivia, Brazil, Bulgaria, Canada, Chile, Costa Rica, Denmark, Estonia, Finland, France, Greece, Guatemala, Iceland, Iran, Ireland, Italy, Japan, Mexico, Norway, Peru, Rhodesia (formerly), Romania, Russia, Serbia, Spain, Sweden, Turkey, Ukraine, the United Kingdom, the United States and Venezuela	

== See also ==
- List of fascist movements
  - List of British fascist parties
- List of fascist movements by country
- List of Ku Klux Klan organizations
  - List of National Socialist black metal bands
- List of Falangist movements
- List of organizations designated by the Southern Poverty Law Center as hate groups
- List of white nationalist organizations
- Political parties whose policies involve antisemitism
