= Militia (disambiguation) =

A militia is an army or other fighting organization of non-professional soldiers.

Militia may also refer to:

== Military and other organizations ==
=== United Kingdom ===
- Militia (British Dominions and Crown Colonies), the principal forces of the Dominions, Self-governing colonies, and Crown Colonies of the British Empire
- Militia (England), pre-18th century military obligations and militia forces in England
- Militia (Great Britain), the principal reserve forces of the Kingdom of Great Britain during the 18th century
- Militia (United Kingdom), the reserve forces of the United Kingdom of Great Britain and Ireland after the Union in 1801

=== Elsewhere ===
- Bosnian militia (Ottoman), a military unit indigenous to Bosnia serving as a provincial army to the Ottoman Empire
- Militia (China), part of the military forces of China
- Militia (Italian neo-Nazi group)
- Militia (United States), various forces in the United States, from the colonial era to the present day
  - Virginia militia, a military unit in Virginia
- Militsiya, the police forces in the Soviet Union (until 1991) and in several Eastern Bloc countries, including:
  - Miliția (Romania), the police force of Communist Romania 1949–1989
  - Militia (Yugoslavia), a law enforcement agency of the Socialist Federal Republic of Yugoslavia 1944–1992

== Other uses ==
- Militia (video game), or Metal Marines, a 1993 real-time strategy game

== Other uses ==
- Militia (video game), or Metal Marines, a 1993 real-time strategy game
