= Georgian protests =

Major protest movements occurred in the Republic of Georgia:

- 2011 Georgian protests, against President Mikheil Saakashvili, asking for political reforms
- 2018 Georgian protests, after a police raid in Tbilisi, when protesters asked for drug legalization
- 2019 Georgian protests, a series of anti-government and snap election-demanding protests
- 2023–2024 Georgian protests, caused by the proposed Georgian law on transparency of foreign influence and its application
- 2024–2026 Georgian protests, after the preliminary official results of the 2024 parliamentary election
