= Georgian National Unity =

Georgian political party

Georgian National Unity საქართველოს ეროვნული ერთობა
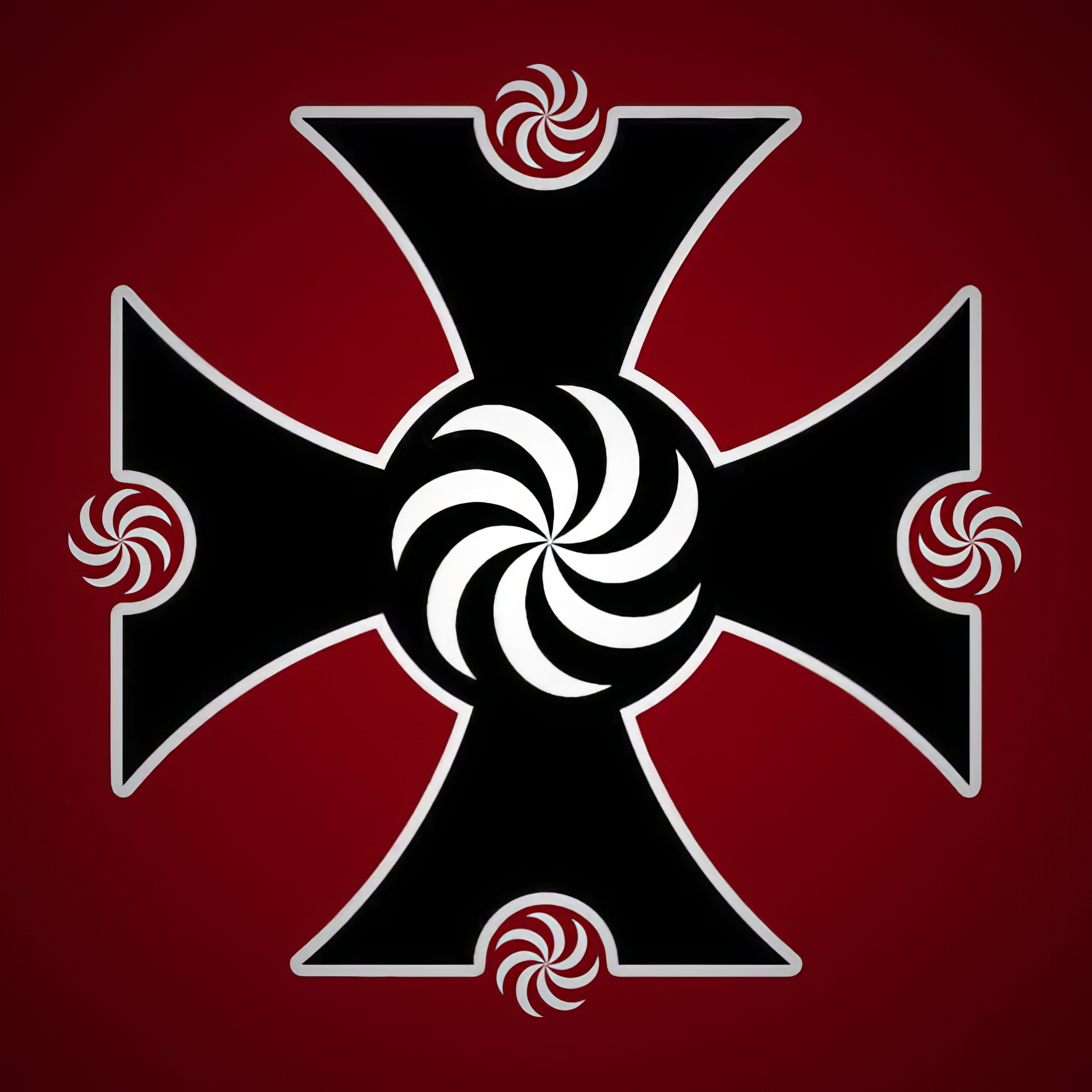
- Leader: Giorgi Chelidze
- Founded: 2 November 2016
- Headquarters: Tbilisi, Georgia
- Ideology: Neo-fascism; Neo-Nazism; Anti-Immigrant Nativism; Georgian nationalism Anti-leftism; Anti-communism; Anti-LGBT; Antifeminism; White nationalism Anti-Masonry; Anti-globalism; Social conservatism
- Political position: Far-right
- Colours: Garnet Black White

Georgian National Unity (Georgian: ქართული ეროვნული ერთობა, romanized: kartuli erovnuli ertoba) is a Georgian neo-fascist political movement. It is headquartered in Tbilisi.

== History ==
=== Founding ===
The Georgian National Unity was registered as a non-profit organization in 2016. It was established by Giorgi Chelidze, a former Georgian Dream supporter and Ministry of Finance employee. In its early years, It mostly focused on translating the fascist literature into Georgian and has started an online petition to ban George Soros's Open Society Georgia Foundation. It has primarily young membership base. In April 2017, the group organized a rally to support the visit of Hungarian Prime Minister Victor Orban and his fight against "Soros and liberalism". The visit came after Orban closed down Central European University funded by the Soros Foundation.

=== Prominence ===
The movement gained prominence during the 2018 Georgian protests organized by the groups supporting the drug liberalization. In May 2018, it organized rallies "against the drug dealers and LGBT propagandists" in Tbilisi giving fascist salutes and chanting "Death to enemy, glory to nation!". It has announced its intention to create the "Popular Guard" or "blackshirt detachment" to counteract the liberal groups such as the White Noise Movement. According to Chelidze, the group was following the strict rules and the violation of discipline and race mixing were the grounds for expulsion from the movement. By May 2018, one of the leaders of the movement, Tornike Kiviladze, a former member of Georgian Idea, left its ranks, alleging that the group was pursuing dangerous aims.

=== Chelidze's arrest ===
On 1 September 2018, Chelidze was arrested on the charges of illegal possession of firearms and ammunition, with the court sentencing him to three years and six months in prison. By May 2019, the group has been described as having "moved to online activism". In 2021, one of the leaders of the group Tornike Vashakidze rejected the possibility of the movement's alliance with businessman Levan Vasadze's Eri party during the latter's quest to unify the far-right, with Vashakidze saying that Vasadze's brand of conservatism is "no better than liberalism".

=== Chelidze's return ===
Chelidze was released from prison in early 2022 and returned to his activity in the group. Following the Russian invasion of Ukraine, in August 2022, the Georgian National Unity founded a volunteer organization "Georgian National Squadron" with a goal of providing volunteer support to the Georgian Defence Forces in case of war and "if necessary, start a partisan movement". According to the group, it was registered with the Ministry of Defence of Georgia but the ministry failed to provide them training. Therefore, the group trained independently using airsofts. Additionally, "in response to the new geopolitical reality and the need to save the Georgian statehood", the Georgian National Unity also realized the "14-point plan" and announced its intention to take part in the 2024 Georgian parliamentary election, although it ultimately did not. In September 2022, the Georgian National Unity, along with the rest of the Georgian right-wing, unleashed criticism of the anti-hate speech law passed by the ruling Georgian Dream party, with Chelidze accusing the "Western liberals" of "pressuring Georgian Dream to silence those Georgians who are against perverted sexual relations and multiculturalism".

== Symbol ==
The Georgian National Unity takes its emblem from Georgian Legion which fought on the side of Nazi Germany during the Second World War.

== Ideology ==
The movement considers the overthrow of the Georgia's nationalist first president, Zviad Gamsakhurdia, in 1992 as the turning point in the country's recent history. According to the movement's leader Giorgi Chelidze, Gamsakhurdia was overthrown by both "Communist Russia" and the "Liberal West". Since then, according to Chelidze, the country has been ruled by the "illegitimate governments" working on Russia and the liberal West. This led to the country being "plundered, destroyed and laid waste to". The Georgian National Unity plans to "restore the legal national governance" through elections.

The movement opposes "leftist liberals" and ideas affiliated with them, such as "normalizing multicultural, feminist and LGBT way of life". According to the statute of the Georgian National Unity, its purpose is to carry out a policy which would prioritize the "Georgian mental worldview". It states that the "traditions, mental, religious and political worldviews of ethnic minorities who are citizens of Georgia will be respected, as long as they do not insult the Georgian worldview".

The Georgian National Group opposes immigration and has promised to "clear the country of the foreign seeds" within a month after taking power. Chelidze has named the dire demographic situation as one of the primary concerns motivating the creation of the group, arguing that the Georgian nation would face extinction with the current trends. He has referred to the Georgian women who marry "Iranians and blacks" as "traitors". He also stated that Georgian should prioritize marrying other Georgian, although marrying another representative of white race is also acceptable. Chelidze considers Georgia to be the origin of the white race. He has elaborated that the "globalist" and "Masonic" powers sought to populate Georgia with foreigners so that the Georgian nation would go extinct.

Chelidze has argued that the primary aim of fascism is the national unity. He claimed that the fascism has been demonized by communists and liberals, to whom he has referred to as "enemies of the mankind". Chelidze called both Marxism and liberalism as "viruses of the international Jewry". Additionally, he has referred to the Georgian Legion as heroes. Chelidze has argued that he was espousing the fascism with Georgian peculiarities, citing Benito Mussolini proclaiming that every nation would have its own fascism with its own national characteristics. Chelidze also drew similarity between the fascist salute and the one displayed during the traditional Georgian dance Khorumi, arguing that both had same ancient roots.

== See also ==
- Fascism in Europe
- List of neo-Nazi organizations
