= Sôl austan, Mâni vestan =

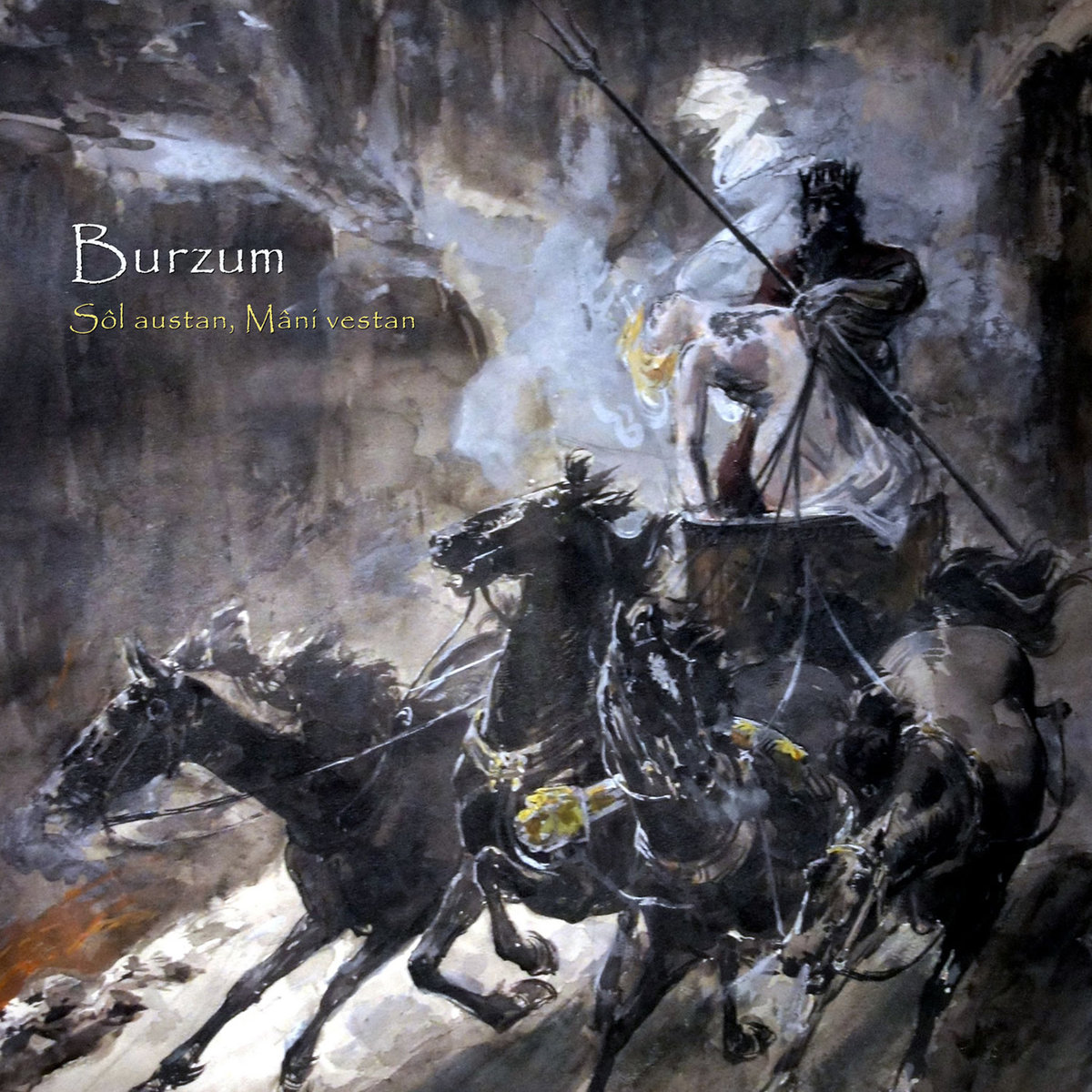

Soundtrack album by Burzum
- Released: 27 May 2013
- Recorded: 2012, Grieghallen
- Genres: Ambient; space music; electronic; neofolk; dark ambient; dungeon synth
- Length: 58:12
- Label: Byelobog Productions
- Producer: Varg Vikernes

Burzum chronology
Umskiptar (2012)	Sôl austan, Mâni vestan (2013)	The Ways of Yore (2014)

Sôl austan, Mâni vestan (Old Norse for "East of the Sun, West of the Moon") is the tenth studio album by the Norwegian act Burzum. It was announced in February 2013 and released through Byelobog Productions on 27 May 2013.

It is Burzum's third instrumental electronic album, after Dauði Baldrs (1997) and Hliðskjálf (1999), which were both recorded while Vikernes was in prison. The rest of Burzum's albums have been mostly black metal. Vikernes has likened Sôl austan, Mâni vestan to the music of Tangerine Dream and the previous electronic releases by Burzum. The album further explores the Pagan spiritual concepts, which were cited as influences for the genre change.

The songs from the album are the soundtrack to the film ForeBears, which was produced and directed by Vikernes and his wife.

Like many of Burzum's albums, this one also has a famous painting as its cover art: The Rape of Proserpina by Spanish painter Ulpiano Checa.

== Track listing ==
No.	Title	Translation (by Varg Vikernes)	Length
1.	"Sôl austan"	East of the Sun	4:22
2.	"Rûnar munt þû finna"	You Shall Find Secrets	3:28
3.	"Sôlarrâs"	Sun-Journey	4:04
4.	"Haugaeldr"	Burial Mound Fire	7:26
5.	"Feðrahellir"	Forebear-Cave	5:21
6.	"Sôlarguði"	Sun-God	7:12
7.	"Ganga at sôlu"	Deasil	5:58
8.	"Hîð"	Bear's Lair	6:24
9.	"Heljarmyrkr"	Death's Darkness	4:02
10.	"Mâni vestan"	West of the Moon	5:55
11.	"Sôlbjörg"	Sunset	4:00
Total length:			58:12

== Charts ==
Chart (2013)	Peak position
Finnish Albums (Suomen virallinen lista)	19
