= Hosank =

Hosank Հայ-արիական ռասայական քաղաքական շարժում
- Leader: Hayk Nazaryan
- Founded: 18 December 2021
- Headquarters: Yerevan, Armenia
- Ideology: List: Neo-Nazism; Armenian nationalism; Aryanism; Racism; Anti-Turkish sentiment; Anti-Americanism; Anti-capitalism; Anti-communism; Right-wing antiglobalism; Antisemitism; Conservatism; Tseghakronism; Authoritarianism
- Political position: Far-right
- Colours: White; Gold; Red
- Slogan: "One nation, one state, one will"

Party flag

Website
- hosank.net

Hosank (Armenian: Հոսանք, lit. 'Current' or 'Flow'), also known as the Armenian-Aryan Racialist Political Movement (Հայ-արիական ռասայական քաղաքական շարժում), is an Armenian neo-Nazi political movement. It was founded on 18 December 2021 and is headquartered in Yerevan.

== History ==
Hosank was established in 2021 by Armenian American Hayk Nazaryan. On 1 January 2024, members of the group paraded around downtown Yerevan with Nazi stylized flags and members acting out the Nazi salute in remembrance of Garegin Nzhdeh.

The movement is not an officially registered political party in Armenia; it has no political representation within the National Assembly.

== Ideology ==
The movement calls for the establishment of a powerful Armenian state, which includes historical territories of Armenia, as well as Artsakh. The movement supports White supremacy and only allowing individuals who are of entirely of Armenian descent to be allowed citizenship in the country, while also encouraging repatriation from the Armenian diaspora. In addition, the movement supports only Europeans living permanently in Armenia, while referring to non-Europeans as "temporary guests". The movement calls for the creation of a "supreme leader" to govern the nation and would be elected by a minority of citizens who are deemed worthy to vote.

== See also ==
- Fascism in Europe
- List of neo-Nazi organizations
- Programs of political parties in Armenia
