= The Ways of Yore =

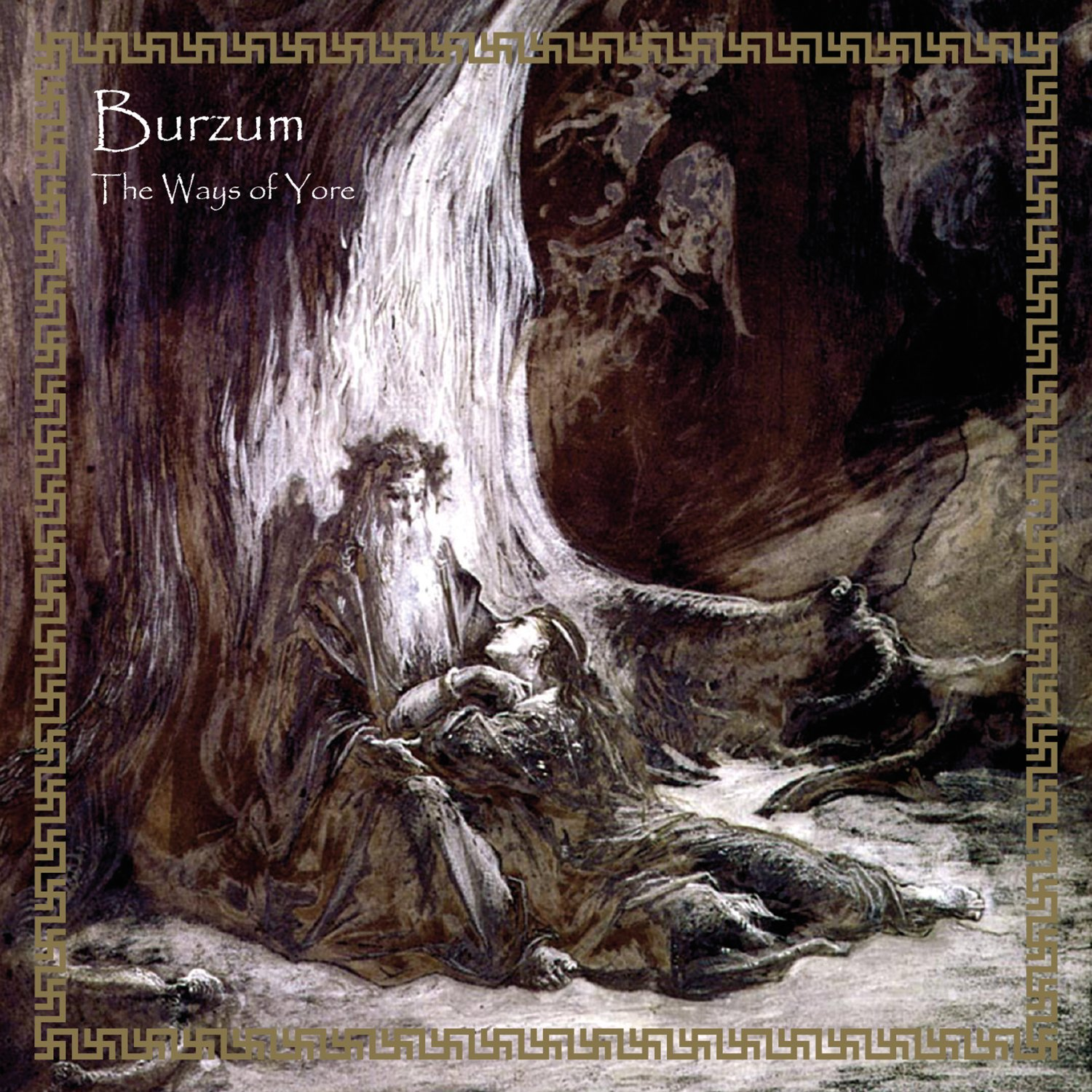

Studio album by Burzum
- Released: 2 June 2014
- Recorded: 2013
- Genre: Medieval; ambient; dungeon synth
- Length: 68:35
- Label: Byelobog Productions
- Producer: Varg Vikernes

Burzum chronology
Sôl austan, Mâni vestan (2013)	The Ways of Yore (2014)	Thulêan Mysteries (2020)

The Ways of Yore is the eleventh studio album by Norwegian musical project Burzum, released on 2 June 2014 by sole member Varg Vikernes' label Byelobog Productions. The album retains the ambient and medieval music sound Vikernes started with Burzum's previous album, Sôl austan, Mâni vestan, albeit introducing vocals.

The album cover features a detail of "Merlin and Vivien", an engraving by famous French artist Gustave Doré for Alfred, Lord Tennyson's poem Idylls of the King, framed by a bordure of swastikas.

== Background ==
Varg Vikernes said of The Ways of Yore on Burzum's official website: "The Ways of Yore is my first step towards something new, which at the same time is as old as the roots of Europe. With The Ways of Yore I try to transport the listener to the days of yore, to make them feel the past, that is still alive in their own blood".

On 12 May 2014, Vikernes posted a 30-second teaser for each of the album's songs on his official YouTube channel.

The songs "Emptiness" and "To Hel and Back Again" are re-recorded versions of the songs "Tomhet" (from Burzum's 1994 album Hvis lyset tar oss) and "Til Hel og tilbake igjen" (from Fallen), respectively.

== Critical reception ==
Professional ratings
Review scores
Source	Rating
AllMusic	3.5/5 stars

On the album, AllMusic wrote: "The album's inherent gloom comes not from the burning hatred and isolation that fueled earlier Burzum albums, but conveys the same intensity through its use of chant and traditional instruments of early Norwegian folk music, which wrap around Vikernes' signature use of ambient electronics to create a truly inspired web of harrowing sound."

== Track listing ==
All tracks are written by Varg Vikernes

No.	Title	Length
1.	"God from the Machine"	1:40
2.	"The Portal"	2:19
3.	"Heill Óðinn"	3:11
4.	"The Lady in the Lake"	4:39
5.	"The Coming of Ettins"	4:36
6.	"The Reckoning of Man"	7:16
7.	"Heil Freyja"	1:56
8.	"The Ways of Yore"	6:11
9.	"Ek fellr" (Old Norse for "I Am Falling")	2:54
10.	"Hall of the Fallen"	5:06
11.	"Autumn Leaves"	4:50
12.	"Emptiness"	13:13
13.	"To Hel and Back Again"	10:44
Total length:		1:08:35

== Personnel ==
- Varg Vikernes – all instruments, vocals
- Dan Capp – design, layout

== Charts ==
Chart (2014)	Peak position
Finnish Albums (Suomen virallinen lista)	40
