= Thulêan Mysteries =

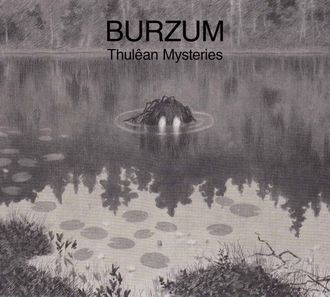

Studio album by Burzum
- Released: 13 March 2020
- Recorded: 2014–2019
- Studio: Varg Vikernes' home, France
- Genre: Ambient; dark ambient; dungeon synth
- Length: 89:50
- Label: Byelobog Productions

Burzum chronology
The Ways of Yore (2014)	Thulêan Mysteries (2020)	The Land of Thulê (2024)

Thulêan Mysteries is the twelfth studio album by Norwegian musical project Burzum, released on 13 March 2020 through Byelobog Productions. It is a double album, comprising the sporadic and random tracks written and recorded by Varg Vikernes since 2014's The Ways of Yore.

Recorded as a soundtrack to Vikernes' role-playing game MYFAROG, the album follows the medieval/dark ambient musical style of the previous albums. Vikernes said of Thulêan Mysteries:

"Since my true passion has never been music, but actually tabletop role-playing games, I figured I should make this an album intended for that use; as background music for my own MYFAROG (Mythic Fantasy Role-playing Game)."

The album's artwork is by Norwegian artist Theodor Kittelsen called "Nøkken".

The song "The Loss of Thulê" is a re-recorded version of the song "The Crying Orc" (from Burzum's 1992 album Burzum, which also has another re-recorded version "Der weinende Hadnur" from Burzum's 1999 album Hliðskjálf) and the song "Skin Traveller" is a re-recorded version of the song "Han som reiste" (from Burzum's 1993 album Det som engang var).

== Track listing ==
All tracks are written by Varg Vikernes

Disc 1
No.	Title	Length
1.	"The Sacred Well"	2:56
2.	"The Loss of a Hero"	0:53
3.	"ForeBears"	4:03
4.	"A Thulêan Perspective"	4:01
5.	"Gathering of Herbs"	1:13
6.	"Heill auk Sæll"	3:36
7.	"Jötunnheimr"	1:37
8.	"Spell-Lake Forest"	1:06
9.	"The Ettin Stone Heart"	1:14
10.	"The Great Sleep"	1:27
11.	"The Land of Thulê"	2:13
12.	"The Lord of the Dwarves"	5:14
13.	"A Forgotten Realm"	7:24
14.	"Heill Óðinn, Sire"	1:17
15.	"The Ruins of Dwarfmount"	1:29
16.	"The Road to Hel"	7:42
17.	"Thulêan Sorcery"	2:10
Total length:		49:35

Disc 2
No.	Title	Length
1.	"Descent Into Niflheimr"	1:42
2.	"Skin Traveller"	4:35
3.	"The Dream Land"	8:42
4.	"Thulêan Mysteries"	4:22
5.	"The Password"	15:13
6.	"The Loss of Thulê"	5:02
Total length:		39:36

== Personnel ==
- Varg Vikernes – all instruments, vocals
