= 1994 Polish local elections =

1994 Polish regional assembly election
- 19 June 1994

2468 municipal councils
- Registered: 27,621,841
- Turnout: 9,329,776 (33.78%) ▼8.49pp
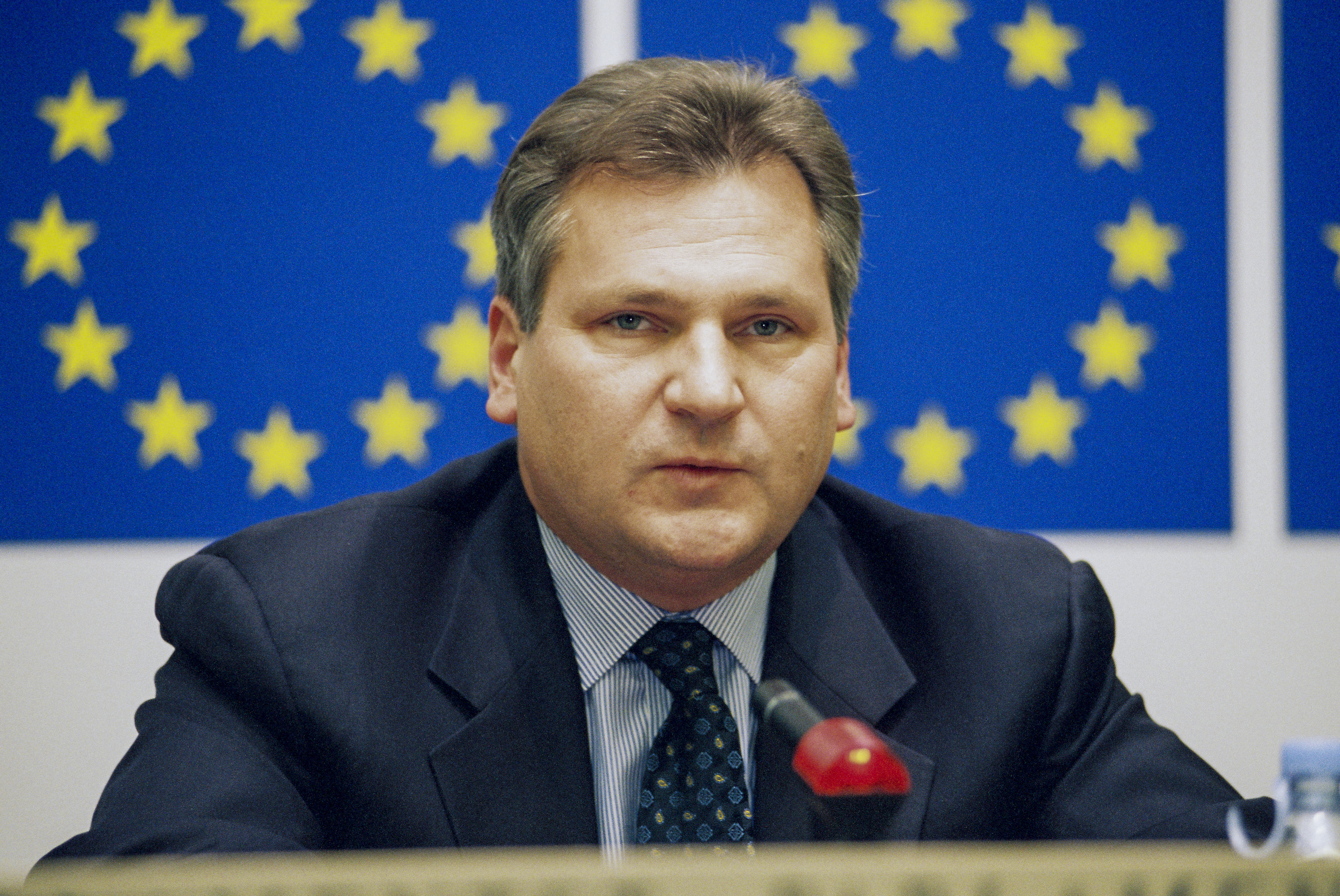

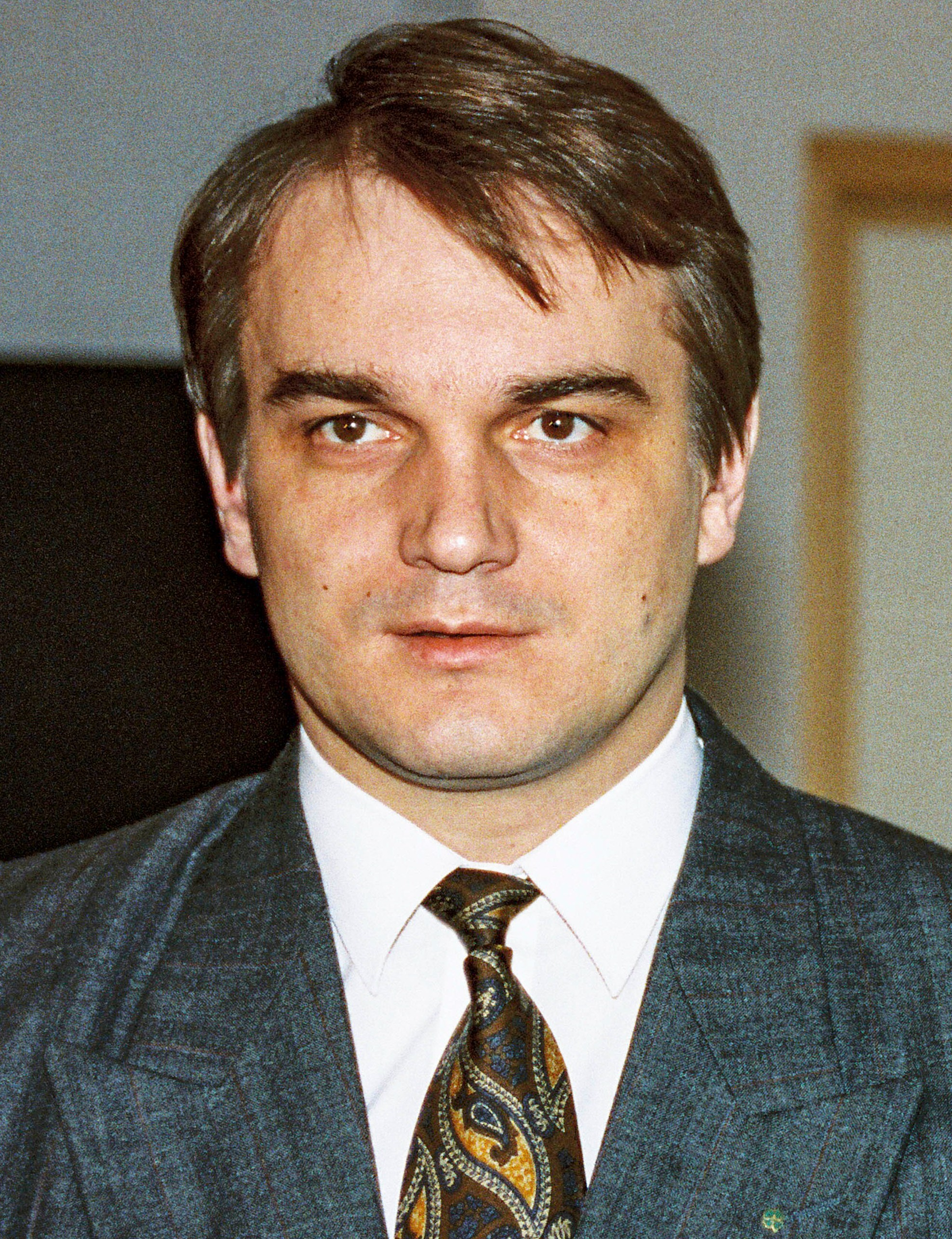

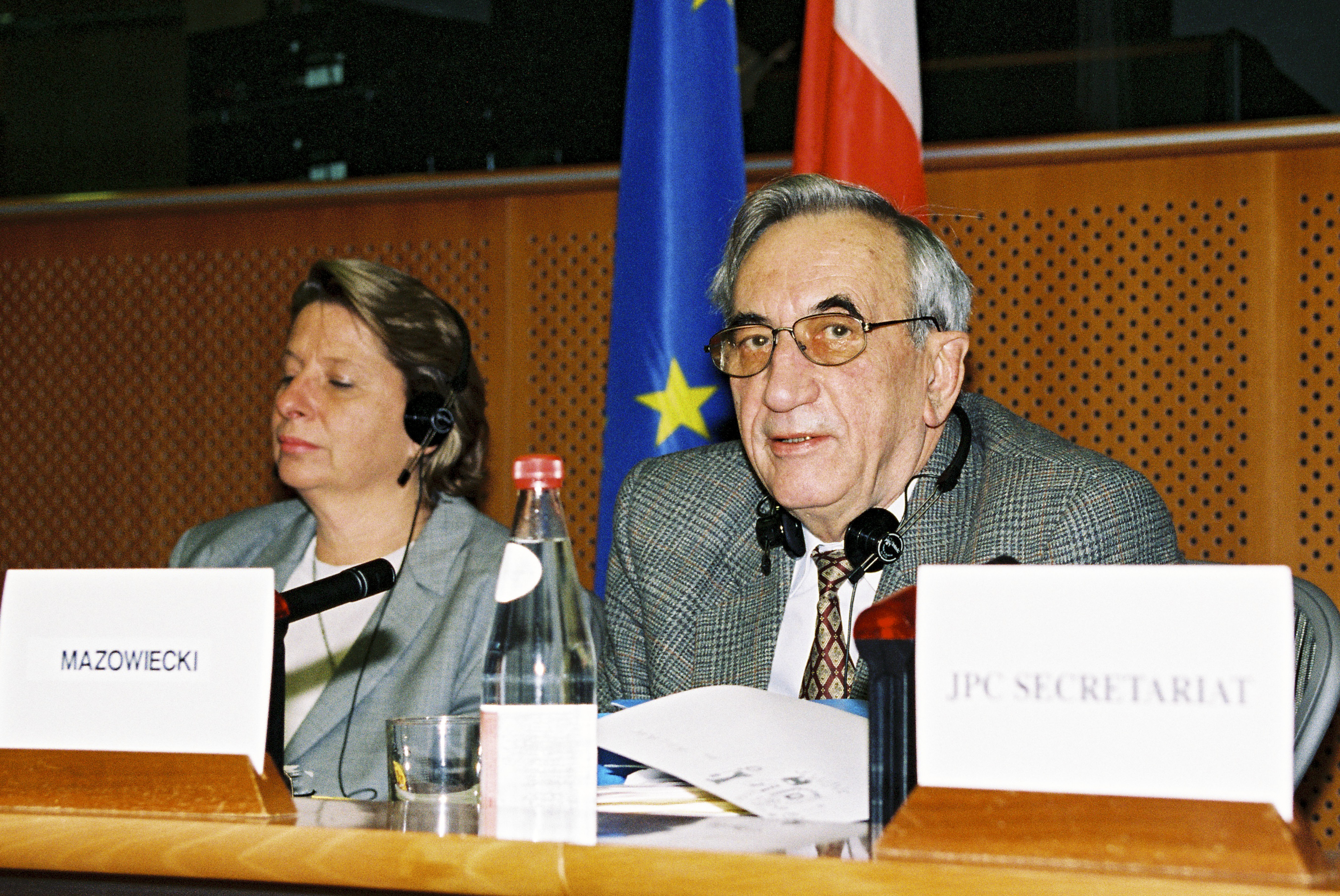

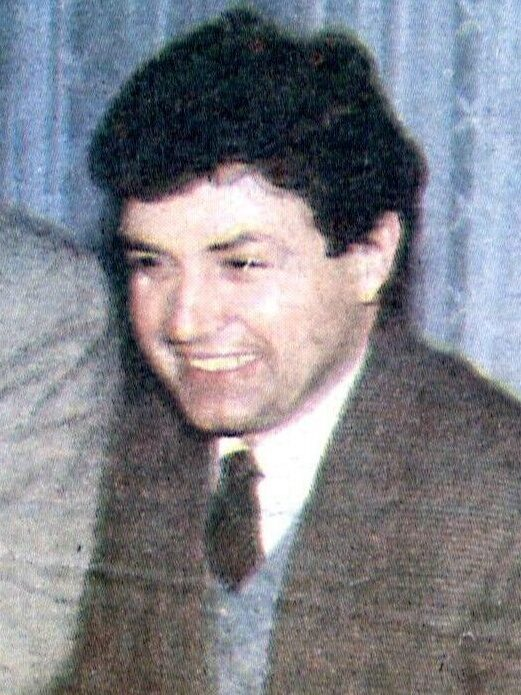

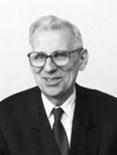

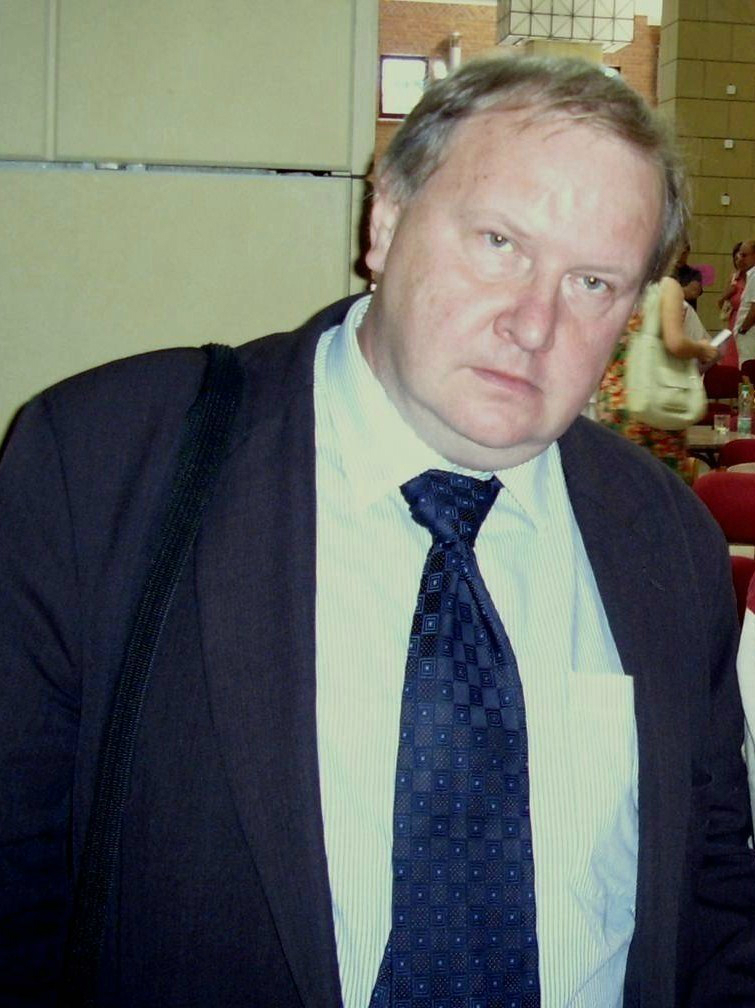

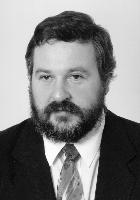

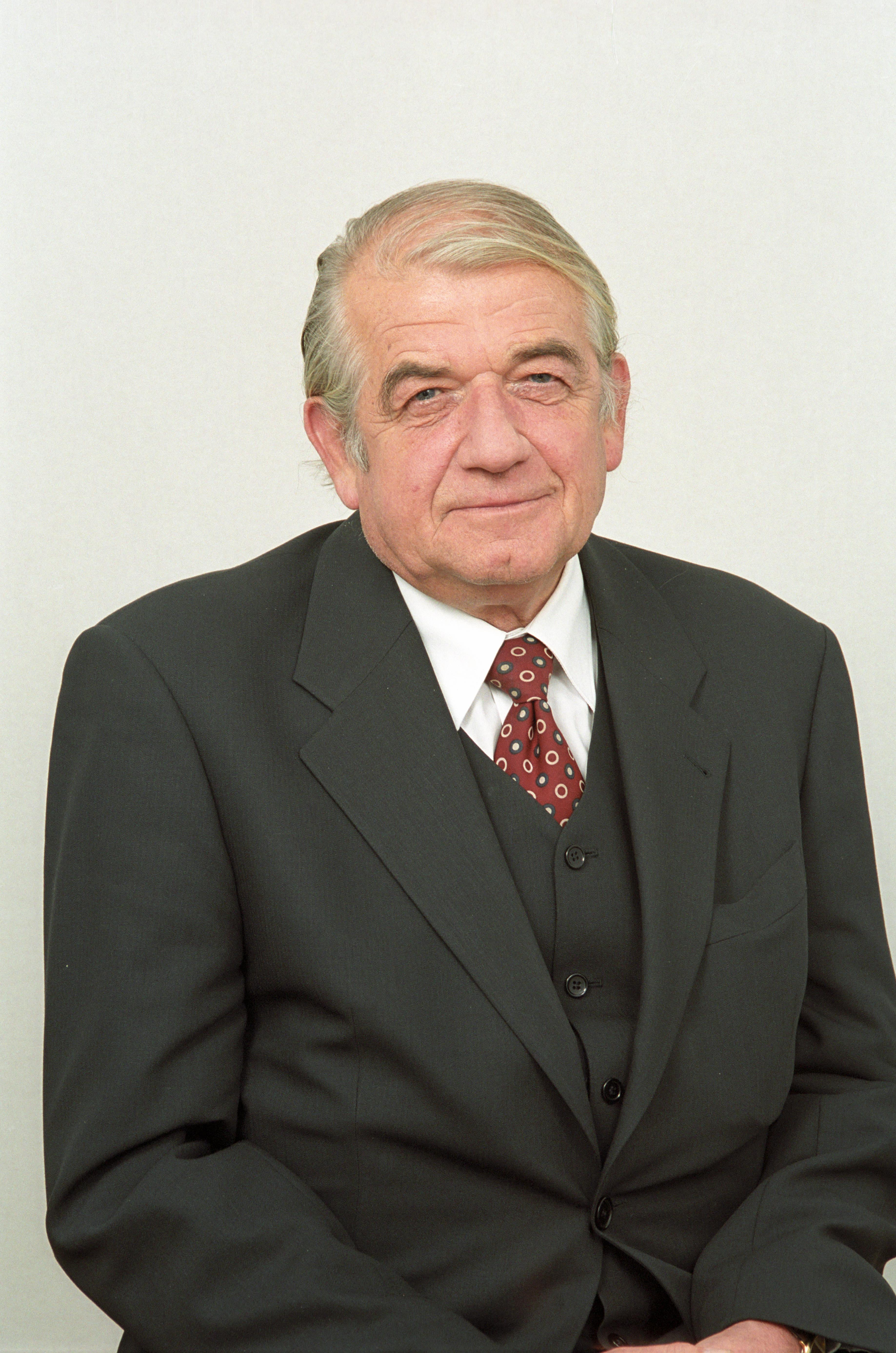
	First party	Second party	Third party
Leader	Aleksander Kwaśniewski	Waldemar Pawlak	Tadeusz Mazowiecki
Party	SLD-SdRP	PSL	UW
Seats won	27%	18%	12%
	Fourth party	Fifth party	Sixth party
Leader	Marian Krzaklewski	Wiesław Chrzanowski; Aleksander Hall; Artur Balazs	Zbigniew Religa
Party	KO "S"	KKW "O"	BBWR
Seats won	5%	4%	3%

The 1994 Polish local elections were held on 19 June 1994.

== Elected positions ==
Representatives for the following were chosen:

- 2468 municipal councils,
- 7 district councils in the gmina Warszawa-Centrum,
- Warsaw City Council

== Background ==
The second local elections in Poland - on 19 June 1994 - took place in a completely different political context than the 1990 Polish local elections. In four years, local government had managed to establish itself and win the trust of Poles - 49% of CBOS respondents said that their gmina council worked well or very well, and confidence in gmina authorities was higher than in any other elected body by 1994. Two developments heavily impacted the national political scene at the time, which had a major impact on local politics: the disintegration and defeat of the Solidarity camp in the 1993 Polish parliamentary election, and the formation of a new ruling coalition, composed of left-wing parties originating from the former communist regime that abandoned further reforms of the country's territorial system. Additionally, numerous new political parties emerged.

For the first time, local government elections were, at least in cities with more than 40,000 inhabitants, clearly linked to nationwide party divisions. For the activists of the extra-parliamentary post-Solidarity parties, the 1994 elections were the first opportunity to gain political foothold after the 1993 defeat, while for the Polish People's Party and the Democratic Left Alliance they were the first assessment of the ruling coalition's actions by voters. The increased interest of politicians in local government elections was manifested in a doubling of the number of candidates for councillors - particularly evident in large cities, where on average seven candidates were running for one seat. As a result, 62% of councillors elected in multi-mandate districts came from lists submitted by political parties and their coalitions.

Unlike the 1990 elections, the 1994 local elections took place on a normal date, after the term of 1990-1994 councilors passed, which was an important sign of political normalization in Poland. The left-wing government of Waldemar Pawlak did not evoke strong feelings from the general population, and was relatively bereft of political conflicts. The largest conflict was considered the departure of Marek Borowski from the office of deputy prime minister and minister of finance. Compared to 1990, local administration was slightly reformed, with the most impactful change being the reform of the local authorities in Warsaw. According to CBOS surveys, 49% of the population was satisfied with their 1990-1994 local council, while 26% of the surveyed were dissatisfied. Rural voters were considerably more satisfied with their local councils (57%), compared to the urban voters (36%). Nevertheless, the general approval of local authorities was also coupled with political apathy.

== Campaign ==
In small towns and municipalities, the public did not require special advertising and self-presentation from candidates, although they sometimes appeared in the local press. Candidates who were well-known in their districts were limited to collecting signatures and informal meetings in small groups. In multi-mandate districts there were posters promoting individuals, and only a few chose to appear in the local media, but TV election programmes were characterised by low appeal. New to the campaign were festivals often organised in larger towns, often combined with primaries. Inadequate promotion resulted in a lack of public interest in voting.

The role of the 1990 voter committees was taken over by the political parties. Already in the pre-election period, the parties tried to form local government-political coalitions. The merger of the Democratic Union and the Liberal Democratic Congress resulted in the formation of a new party, the Freedom Union, which established local coalitions such as the Freedom and Local Government Union (Polish: Unia Wolności i Samorządności), the Wrocław 2000 Civic Coalition (Polish: Koalicja Obywatelska "Wrocław 2000"), the Gdańsk UW-PK Coalition and the Kraków Your City Coalition (Polish: Koalicja Krakowska "Twoje Miasto").

Right-wing groups also formed ad hoc electoral coalitions, such as Centre Right for Warsaw (Polish: Centroprawica dla Warszawy) and Right Together (Polish: Prawica Razem) in Kraków. The National Party also participated in the election, running independently in regions such as Poznań, while entering coalitions with right-leaning parties in other. It participated in a coalition Rightist Łódź (Polish: Prawa Łódź) organized by parties such as the Party of Christian Democrats, the Christian National Union, and Peasants' Agreement.

The political campaign was characterized by consolidation of parliamentary political parties - SLD and PSL ran independently and used their own name. According to the CBOS polls, the intensity of political campaign heavily varied between urban and rural constituencies. In medium-sized cities, 70% of those surveyed stated that the political campaign was noticeable. In large cities (500,000 people or more), only 45% did, and in the countryside only 10% of correspondents considered the political campaign noticeable. Voters were more informed about meetings with candidates - 45% of urban and 25% of rural voters were aware of them.

In Poznań, a common list united 14 right-wing organisations, while the Democratic Left Alliance, Polish People's Party and Labour Union issued lists under their own names (the exception was Warsaw, where these parties created one list). Far-left parties that participated in the election, such as the Self-Defence of the Republic of Poland and the Polish Socialist Party did not enter electoral alliances. Although local government elections in large cities were dominated by political groupings, there were also committees expressing local interests; such committees were more common in small municipalities, where, in principle, candidates did not have to form an electoral representation. The lack of need to demonstrate party affiliation is also evidenced by the names of local committees, in which voters were not able to see political affiliations. The election was also contested by some far-right parties, such as the National Self-Defence Front.

== Election results ==
=== Distribution of seats ===
Electoral committee	% of seats
Democratic Left Alliance-SdRP	27%
Polish People's Party	18%
Freedom Union	12%
Solidarity Citizens' Committee	5%
Catholic Electoral Committee "Fatherland"	4%
Nonpartisan Bloc for Support of Reforms	3%
Labour Union	3%
Centre Agreement	2%
Confederation of Independent Poland	2%
Self-Defence of the Republic of Poland	1%
Other parties, including: Polish Socialist Party; National Party; Party of Christian Democrats; Christian National Union; National Self-Defence Front; Peasants' Agreement	6%
Independents	17%
Total	100%

=== Distribution of votes ===
Party	Votes	%
All candidates	9,022,499	100.00
Total	9,022,499	100.00
Valid votes	9,022,499	96.71
Invalid votes	149,772	1.61
Blank votes	157,505	1.69
Total votes	9,329,776	100.00
Registered voters/turnout	27,621,841	33.78
Source: National Electoral Commission

=== Summary ===
The elections were held on 19 June 1994, and were largely ignored by the general population. The election was dominated by local electoral committees representing local interests, with names such as "Citizens of ...", "For the Common Good Inter-Parish Agreement", "Firefighters", "Allotmentists", "Co-operative Committee". Parties such as SLD, UP, PSL and UW ran under their own names. Andrzej Piasecki wrote that most committees contained candidates with centre-right political views. In cities of 40,000 or more, there were 761 electoral lists and 39,839 candides in total, contesting for 5337 seats. In other gminas there were 142,061 candidates contesting 46,569 seats.

The National Electoral Commission (PKW) caused controversy by presenting the results in a complicated way, without stating how many seats each political party and electoral committee had won. The authorities of the commission claimed that this was beyond the purpose of the PKW. This forced political scientists to estimate the results based on the polls as well as the internal estimates of the political parties. The press considered the Democratic Left Alliance and the Polish People's Party the winners of the local elections, while the results of parties such as the Labour Union and right-wing coalitions fell below expectations. This was confirmed by the estimates of Polish political scientist Dominik Sieklucki, who calculated that the SLD had won 27% of council seats, while the PSL won 18%.

Coalitions were the most characteristic element of these local elections. Parties formed extensive, highly diverse alliances, both with other parties aspiring to participate in national politics and with local groupings. This made it difficult to estimate who won the 1994 elections. In a CBOS survey conducted after the elections on a representative sample of councillors, 8% of councillors admitted to having been elected on the recommendation of PSL, SLD/SdRP - 6%, UW - 2%, NSZZ ‘Solidarność’ - 2%, KKW ‘Ojczyzna’ - 3%.

Turnout for municipal councils reached 33,78% with 1,60% invalid votes. Moreover, 1,69% of ballots cast were blank. In comparison, in the 1990 Polish local elections, 3% of the ballots were invalid and 5% were blank - because of this, media noted that Polish voters were getting used to electoral procedures. Moreover, the election brought about the domination of political parties - 64% of elected councillors belonged to a political party. This marked a considerable change from the 1990 local elections, where only around a quarter (27,6%) of councillors were from political parties - in comparison, 39% of newly-elected councillors were independent, and 46,1% came from voter committees.

There was almost no electoral campaign activity, which also translated into low turnout of 33,78%. Media campaigns started very late, at the end of May 1994. One of the leading issues during the election was decommunization - many streets had been renamed, which was seen as controversial and confusing by most voters. Some candidates addressed this issue by pledging to not change the street plaques, thus keeping the old socialist names. Most voters were also unaware of the candidates and parties, saved for the most established ones like SLD and PSL. Media discussed the mysteriousness of the names of many election committees, such as "Alliance for ..." or "City League". The profileration of unknown committees and names discouraged voters. The capitalist reforms, rising unemployment and lack of prospects also translated into growing social pessimism. Some also pointed out that the low turnout was caused by 'political fatigue', as this marked the 5th election in four years. The election also became unique in that, contrary to the 1993 parliamentary elections, the inhabitants of rural areas and small towns voted more willingly than urban voters, with a difference of over 10 percentage points.

Almost half of the elected councillors were re-electees from the 1990 election or from the Communist Poland. In large cities, 62% of seats were acquired by political parties. SLD won in 29 voivodeship capital cities. Whereas SLD won in northern, western and central Poland, rightwing parties won in southern and eastern Poland. Center-right coalitions won in eight voivodeship capitals, and the Freedom Union with its allies in seven. The rest were won by local coalitions. In the gminas, PSL was the most successful party.

== Opinion polls ==
=== CBOS polls ===
Date	Sample size	PSL	SLD	UW	UP	PdP (Note: Alliance for Poland (Polish: Przymierze dla Polski), defined as a possible coalition of: Christian National Union; Centre Agreement; Peasants' Agreement; Movement for the Republic; Conservative Coalition.)	KO "S"	BBWR	KKW "O"	KPN	SRP	Others	Independent candidate	Undecided	Lead
19-23 May 1994	654	21	12	15	8	6	6	4	5	3	1	2	6	12	6
7-10 May 1994	634	16	15	12	10	7	4	4	4	4	1	2	3	18	1
Source: Najdowski, Jarosław (31 May 1994). "Przed wyborami samorządowymi". Komunikat z badań (in Polish) (BS/93/81/94). Warsaw: CBOS: 7.

=== OBOP polls ===
Date	Sample size	PSL	SLD	UW	UP	BBWR	KO "S"	KKW "O"	KPN	Others	Undecided	Lead
19 June 1994 (exit poll - multi-seat constituencies)	1463	2	26	22	4	21				25 (Note: Local committees: 18; Business lists: 3; Others: 4)	-	4
6-24 May 1994 (Note: Combined probe)	2554	18	14	9	6	5	4	4	3	6	31	4
20-24 May 1994	1277	17	14	8	7	5	3	3	3	5	35	3
6-10 May 1994	1277	19	14	10	6	6	6	5	3	5	26	5
Source: "Na kogo będą głosować Polacy w wyborach samorządowych - maj 1994?" (in Polish). Warsaw: OBOP. 25 May 1994. "Wybory samorządowe 19 czerwca 1994 r. Wyniki badania exit poll" (in Polish). Warsaw: OBOP. 19 June 1994. (exit poll)
