= 2018 Georgian protests =

2018 protests in Georgia

2018 protests in Georgia
- Date: First wave: 12–17 May 2018; Second wave: 31 May - 11 June 2018
- Location: Georgia
- Caused by: Police raids on nightclubs (first wave); A perceived miscarriage of justice in the case involving killing of teenagers in a street knife-combat (second wave)
- Goals: Drug legalization (first wave); Banning drug and LGBT propaganda (counter-protesters); Resignation of chief prosecutor (second wave)
- Methods: Demonstrations, civil disobedience
- Result: The government agrees on drug policy reform; A planned pro-LGBT rally cancelled; Chief prosecutor resigns and the parliament creates fact-finding commission to investigate the case

Parties
White Noise Movement	(Georgia (country)) Government of Georgia; Ministry of Internal Affairs; State Security Service of Georgia; Prosecutor's Office of Georgia	Georgian March; Georgian National Unity

Lead figures
None	Giorgi Kvirikashvili; Giorgi Gakharia; Bidzina Ivanishvili	Sandro Bregadze; Giorgi Chelidze

The 2018 Georgian protests were series of mass protests in Tbilisi that started on 12 May, when police raided the nightclubs Bassiani and Gallery with a stated purpose of preventing illegal drug sale. Protesters gained momentum when thousands gathered in front of the Parliament building, where organizers called for drug policy reform. The protests were met by various counter-protests and rallies. On May 13, the fascist organization Georgian National Unity rallied against the "drug dealers and LGBT propagandists", as its leader, Giorgi Chelidze has stated. Various conservative organizations headed by Georgian March and Georgian Idea also organized counter-protests against the drug liberalization, gathering thousands of people in front of the Parliament building. As the protests became more politicized, thousands demanded the resignation of prime minister Giorgi Kvirikashvili.

According to the Institute for War and Peace Reporting, "street protests have highlighted divisions between Georgia's long-standing conservative traditions and emerging, more liberal views". The protests were described as "Raveolution" and "Technoprotests" by media outlets. President Giorgi Margvelashvili said the following day that Tbilisi was "on the brink of civil war".

The Minister of Internal Affairs Giorgi Gakharia has stated that the raid in nightclubs on May 12 came after 48 cases of drug intoxication of clubbers over the past two weeks. According to his statement, the ministry has been monitoring the nightclubs and detected various cases of illegal drug trade. The aim of the special operation was to uncover links between the drug dealers and the nightclub personnel. The minister showed up in front of protesters on May 13 and apologized for alleged instances of police misconduct. He met the organizers of the protests and agreed to create two working groups. One group would work on the draft of a drug policy and another on the police raid and whether the individual law enforcers exceeded their powers or not. The actions of the minister caused negative reaction among the conservative public.

The protest mobilization continued in the next days on both sides, which led to a planned pro-LGBT rally being cancelled on 17 May due to "safety concerns". Conservative groups said that they would not allow LGBT propaganda in the Tbilisi's streets. Instead, the celebrations of Family Purity Day were held, a holiday created by the Georgian Orthodox Church in 2014 to counteract "LGBT propaganda".

On 31 May another wave of demonstrations started in the streets of Tbilisi to protest a perceived miscarriage of justice following the killing of two 15 years old teenagers in a street knife-combat in December. The protests continued sporadically until June 11, when the police dismantled camps erected by the protesters in front of the parliament building in Tbilisi. Georgia's chief prosecutor Irakli Shotadze resigned over the case, while the government established a special parliamentary fact-finding commission chaired by an opposition politician.

On 13 June 2018, Prime Minister Giorgi Kvirikashvili resigned following the May protests.

On 30 July 2018, the Constitutional Court of Georgia ruled that "consumption of marijuana is an action protected by the right to free personality" and that "[Marijuana] can only harm the user's health, making that user him/herself responsible for the outcome. The responsibility for such actions does not cause dangerous consequences for the public." The ruling effectively legalized the use and possession of cannabis in Georgia but kept in place penalties for cultivation and sale of the drug. Actions which also remained illegal include public consumption and use in the presence of children.

== See also ==
- White Noise Movement
- Cannabis in Georgia (country)
- 2021 Tbilisi Pride protests
