= 1990 Polish local elections =

1990 Polish regional assembly election
- 27 May 1990

2468 municipal councils
- Registered: 26,925,267
- Turnout: 11,380,629 (42.27%)
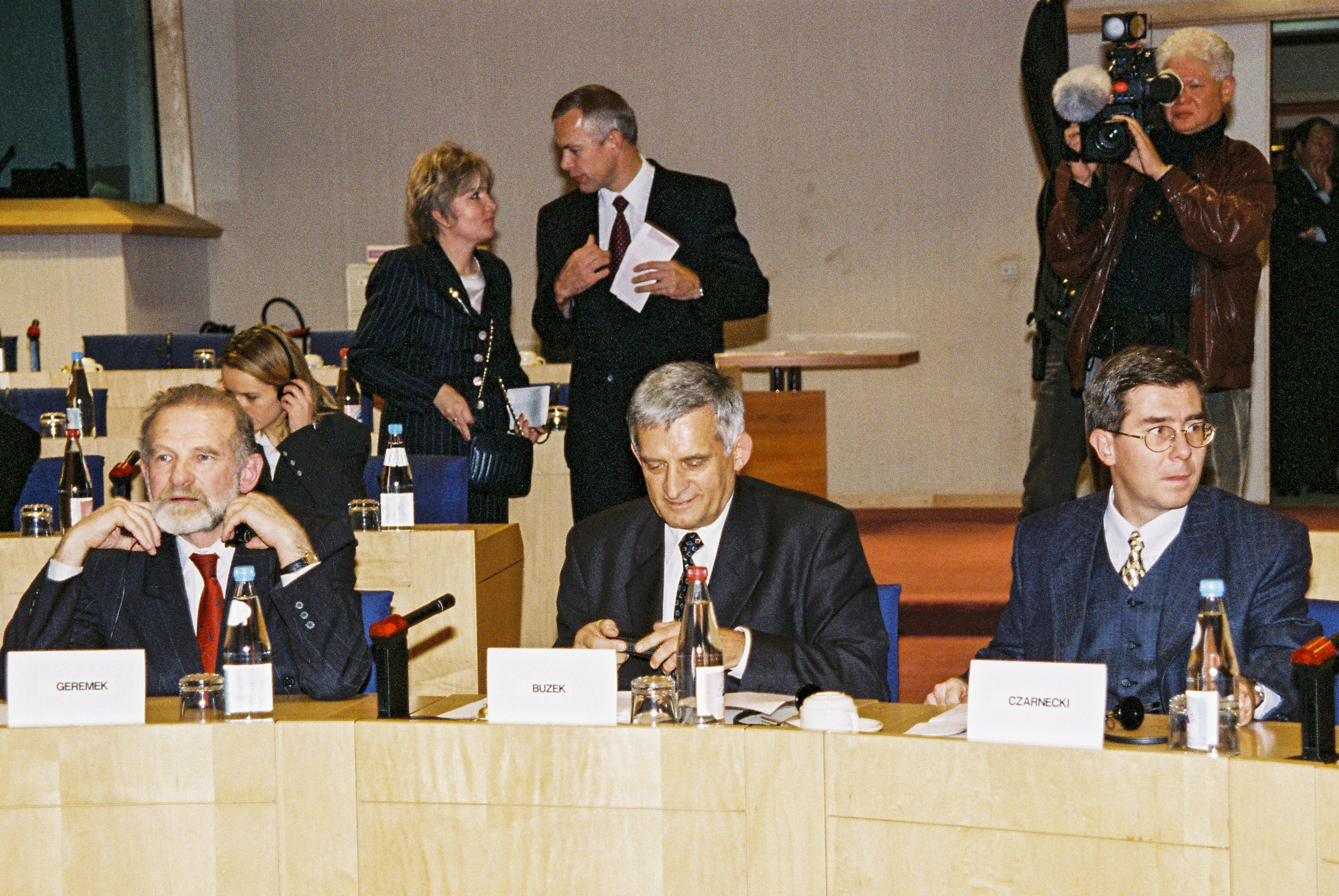

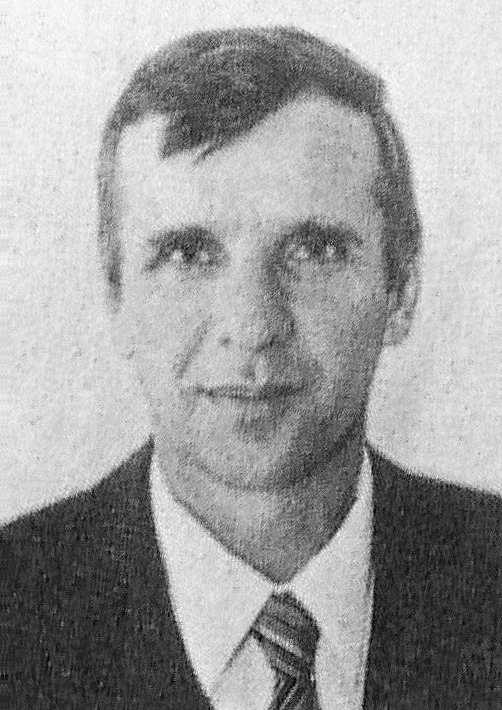

	First party	Second party	Third party
Leader	Bronisław Geremek	Roman Bartoszcze	Gabriel Janowski
Party	KO "S"	PSL	Rural Solidarity
Seats won	41.4%	6.5%	4.3%

The 1990 Polish local elections were held on 27 May 1990. These were the first elections to local self-government in Poland after its restoration (it was abolished in 1950 and replaced for four decades by national councils).

== Elected positions ==
Representatives for the following were chosen:

- 2468 municipal councils,
- 7 district councils in the gmina Warszawa-Centrum,
- Warsaw City Council (for the first time since 1990).

== Organisation ==
The Sejm began legislative work on local government reform in January 1990. On 8 March 1990, the chamber passed a package of laws introducing the reform, including the Act amending the Constitution of the Polish People's Republic, the Act on Local Self-Government and the electoral law for gmina councils. In municipalities with up to 40,000 inhabitants, councillors were elected in single-mandate districts, and in larger municipalities - on a proportional basis. This shape of the electoral law was the fruit of a compromise between the Citizens' Parliamentary Club (preferring a majority system) and established parties (favouring a proportional system).

The composition of 2383 municipal councils was elected. (1547 councils in municipalities, 145 municipal councils in cities with up to 40,000 inhabitants, 110 municipal councils in cities with more than 40,000 inhabitants, 574 municipal-city councils and 7 district councils of Warsaw). There were 52,037 seats to be filled, for which 147,389 candidates competed. Councillors were elected in 47,997 districts (47 254 single-mandate and 743 multi-mandate). 51,987 councillors were elected (30,002 councillors in municipalities, 3,552 municipal councillors in cities with up to 40,000 inhabitants, 4,435 municipal councillors in cities with more than 40,000 inhabitants and 344 councillors in Warsaw districts).

== Campaign ==
The restoration and reconstitution of local authorities in Polish gminas spurred growth of political activism, as many came to see the possibility of building political support with the use of local citizen committees. Lech Wałęsa, the President of Poland, did not directly comment on the local elections, but his appeals such as "take the matter into your own hands" were interpreted as encouragements. In February 1990, Wałęsa called for a swift organization of local elections, with the support of Prime Minister Mazowiecki. However, the political environment of Wałęsa, Solidarność, was also wary of the influence of citizen committee movements that spearheaded local government reforms.

The established political parties reacted to the local elections with indifference or protest. The declining PZPR was especially opposed to the local elections, as it signified losing even more of its influence. The MPs of the PZPR such as Włodzimierz Cimoszewicz criticized the pace of the reforms, their extent, and also resignation from having a unitary, centralized governance. Other left-wing parties varied in their attitude towards the election - the Social Democracy of the Republic of Poland was critical, arguing that the local elections and local government reforms would not increase the influence of local communities on the government, decrease the dependence of bureaucracy, or introduce greater democracy. The party instead argued that the reform only served to increase the position of the ruling Solidarność. However, the Polish Social Democratic Union accepted the reform and praised it as a correct way to introduce democracy on the local level. The newly refounded Polish Socialist Party likewise supported the local elections.

The local elections proved an opportunity for many new parties to establish themselves. On the left, especially the Polish Socialist Party leaned on the local elections to build party structures. This was also utilized by other newly established parties, such as the Polish People's Party and the reformed Alliance of Democrats, which focused on the local governments in their programs. Neoliberal parties such as the Liberal Democratic Congress and the Real Politics Union also organized intensive campaigns, campaigning on the need to prevent local governments from owning industries, as this would halt the privatization programs. Christian democrat party Christian National Union saw the elections as an opportunity to realize the ideals of social solidarity and mutual assistance. Meanwhile, the Confederation of Independent Poland and Centre Agreement considered the election important in order to purge local structures of communist officials.

The most numerous group were the candidates put forward by citizens' groups - 46,1%, followed by the candidates of the civic-solidarity movement - 27,5%, other political parties and groupings put forward - 12,6%, and social, professional and self-governing organisations - 7,6%. The remainder were candidates of local coalitions and organisations difficult to classify. According to a study by the UW research team, 31% of candidates before 1990 belonged to a party or organisation that was part of the Front of National Unity or the Patriotic Movement for National Rebirth, 46% belonged before 1990 to youth organisations, and 31% to the Solidarity movement. However, these figures did not reflect the true political mosaic of the pre-election period, which consisted of around a hundred parties, 270 organisations that were considered regional and local parties and 660 other structures.

The campaign played out primarily at the local level. The programmes of the electoral committees were created on the basis of the investment priorities of individual settlements and villages. In addition, they included criticism of the previous local authorities and communist governments (also on a general scale), demands to the central authorities for more funds for commune development, and expressions of dissatisfaction with the current government. Matters of so-called ‘big politics’ rarely appeared. The Confederation of Independent Poland reached for anti-communism in its campaigning (slogans from posters: ‘Enough of socialism, comrades’, “Come on, red sunshine”) and tried to take over the Solidarity electorate (slogan from a poster: ‘If you were disappointed with Solidarity, don't boycott the elections - vote for KPN"). The Confederation of Independent Poland formed many local coalitions, mainly with newly established parties with a Christian Democratic and agrarian-nationalist profile. These groupings (e.g. Christian Democracy, Labour Party and Christian National Union) ran more often in cooperation with civic committees and treated the local elections as preparation for the future fight for parliamentary and senatorial seats.

The campaign run by the Social Democracy of the Republic of Poland reflected the party's weakness and uncertainty (slogans: ‘Don't be afraid - vote for the SdRP’, ’Vote for our candidates. There will be no true pluralism without us"). However, in spite of its apparent defeatism, the Social Democracy of the Republic of Poland was seriously involved in the campaign with a broad electoral campaign. Its candidates talked about unemployment, the need for self-organisation of society. The Polish People's Party tried in this campaign to erase the image of the heir of the post-communist United People's Party. That is why radical agrarian demands were exposed and historical traditions of the interwar PSL were eagerly referred to. The organisational and financial independence of the party was emphasised (‘Our candidates do not benefit from foreign grants and experts’). In its pre-election campaign, the Alliance of Democrats tried, with mediocre success, to refer to the tradition of the 3rd of May Constitution, often invoking such notions as homeland, property, dignity, freedom, family, nation.

== Election results ==
=== Distribution of seats ===
Electoral committee	% of seats
Solidarity Citizens' Committee	41.4%
Independents	38%
Polish People's Party	6.5%
Rural Solidarity	4.3%
Other rural and agrarian parties	2.25%
Alliance of Democrats	2.1%
Unelected/vacant seats	2.02% (Note: 50 councillors were not elected.)
Communist trade unions	1.5%
Confederation of Independent Poland	1.0%
Ethnic minorities committees	0.65%
Social Democracy of the Republic of Poland	0.28%
Total	100%
Source: Samorząd terytorialny i wspólnoty lokalne.

=== Distribution of votes ===
Party	Votes	%
Solidarity Citizens' Committee		55.00
Independent		24.70
Others		10.20
Polish People's Party		4.30
Social Democracy of the Republic of Poland		2.70
Alliance of Democrats		2.10
Confederation of Independent Poland		1.00
Total		
Valid votes	10,491,385	92.19
Invalid votes	337,754	2.97
Blank votes	551,490	4.85
Total votes	11,380,629	–
Registered voters/turnout	26,925,267	42.27
Source: National Electoral Commission

=== Summary ===
In the election, the number of invalid and blank votes was quite high - 3% of the ballots were invalid and 5% were blank - because of this, media noted that Polish voters were still getting used to electoral procedures. The law on municipal councils, at that time the only local government body elected by universal suffrage, provided for majority elections in single-mandate constituencies in rural municipalities and towns with up to 40,000 inhabitants, while in towns with more than 40,000 inhabitants elections were held in multi-mandate constituencies with proportional allocation of seats to electoral committee lists based on a modified Sainte-Laguë method. Cities with more than 40 000 inhabitants accounted for 110 out of 2383 municipalities and more than 40% of the electorate lived in them, so voting results in the larger cities dominated media coverage of local elections and this became the rule for the next 25 years.

Summing up the campaigning before the first local elections, Andrzej Piasecki notes the poverty of resources, lack of professionalism and little media involvement. As a result, the turnout at the ballot box on 27 May 1990 was below expectations - 42.7%. In cities, where the proportional system was used, 40.5% voted, in smaller centres 44.4%. The low turnout was determined by the progressive disenchantment with the Solidarity government, the government's hard-line economic policy, the inexpressive electoral campaign, the low understanding of the rank of local government, the limited number of candidates in single-mandate districts and the smaller number of party candidates compared to the number of non-affiliated candidates. According to post-election surveys, the most active and pro-reform stance was taken by the intelligentsia and highly skilled workers. ‘Those who went to the polls felt more like citizens, the owners of their towns and villages, those who were able to stand together against the atomising pressure of the old system,’ summarised Gazeta Wyborcza.

The election result confirmed the dominant role of the Solidarity and citizen movements on the Polish political scene. In Warsaw, out of 345 councillors, 301 came from the Solidarity-associated citizen movements. In Gdańsk, out of 60 seats, they won 59. In Kraków, out of 75 seats, 72 went to these candidates and 3 to Confederation of Independent Poland. In several voivodeship cities, the citizen committees won over 70% (or even over 85%) of the seats in the councils, as was the case in Bielsko-Biała, Częstochowa, Krosno, Łódź, Płock, Przemyśl, Rzeszów, Skierniewice, Szczecin, Wałbrzych, Wrocław and Zielona Góra. The rate was lower in those voivodeship cities where there were conflicts within the Solidarity camp or where support for Solidarity was already lower than the national average in 1989. This applied to: Łomża, Piła, Ciechanów, Konin, Włocławek, Lublin, Sieradz, Koszalin, Siedlce, Piotrków. In cities with a population of less than 40,000 and in municipalities, support for Solidarity was lower and at the same time (due to the lack of electoral lists) more difficult to estimate. Overall, the Solidarity and affiliated citizen committees won about 24,000 seats. Among the parties, the Polish People's Party fared best, while the result of the other political groupings nationwide fluctuated between 1-3%. In municipalities with up to 40 000 inhabitants, the majority of seats (52%) were won by candidates put forward by citizens' groups. In the former Galicia, the highest electoral efficiency was recorded among the 464 candidates put forward at village meetings. As many as 61% of them won seats, with the average for single-mandate districts being 36%.

The general perception was that the 1990 elections, with a turnout of 42.3 per cent of eligible voters, were won by the Solidarity Civic Committees, winning around 55% of the vote and gaining 41,4% of all mandates. In many places, the citizen movement associated with Solidarity appeared under local names and sometimes fielded two competing lists. In total, the civic committees, the Solidarity Citizens' Committee and the Rural Solidarity submitted almost 40,000 candidates. Emerging and resurgent political parties received small percentages of the vote: Polish People's Party - 4,3% with 6,5% of the mandates, Social Democracy of the Republic of Poland - 2,7% with just 0,28% of all mandates, Alliance of Democrats - 2,1%, and Confederation of Independent Poland - 1,0%.

== Demographics ==
Many candidates of the parties of the former regime did not reveal their party affiliation, and local coalitions without party affiliation were quite often formed around the Social Democracy of the Republic of Poland and the Polish People's Party. It is estimated that while the Social Democracy of the Republic of Poland fielded its own lists in 154 multi-mandate districts, a further 250 lists were affiliated with the party. The fact that the Polish People's Party registered 11,500 candidates, representing almost 8% of all contenders for seats, was indicative of the party's strength in those elections. Local voter committees dominated the largest number of municipalities, winning 24,7% of the vote nationally. Although the huge wave of popularity of the civic movement associated with Solidarity gave civic committees more than 70% of councillors in Kraków, Rzeszów, Wrocław, Gdańsk, but also in Skierniewice or Nowy Targ, it did not reach many municipalities in Poland, especially small towns and villages. There, loose local coalitions ruled indivisibly - 52% of all elected councillors did not state any organisational affiliation.

Newcomers predominated among the newly elected councillors; 74% were first-time councillors and 16% had experience from one term on the national council, the remainder had more. Men prevailed - 90% (the highest percentage was in Łomża Province - 94%, the lowest in Warsaw Province - 81%). The new councillors were younger and slightly less educated than their predecessors from the communist-era municipal and communal national councils. Almost 30% had a university degree, 30% had secondary education, about 25% had vocational education and 15% had primary education.The average age of councillors in 1990 was 48. The dominant group was the economically active (90%). The largest group - 33% - were farmers, almost as many representatives of the intelligentsia, creators, executives. Far fewer were civil servants - 17% - but this was a very effective group, as they made up only 4% of the candidates. The ideological and political preferences of the councillors were determined not only by their current organisational affiliation (often changeable and difficult to determine), but also by their past activity in public life. 40% of the councillors belonged to the ‘Solidarity’ movement between 1980 and 1981, 12% were harassed in various ways during martial law, and about 20% belonged to the PZPR. As many as 82% of the councillors surveyed declared a positive attitude towards Solidarity (33% were strong supporters and 3% opposed). One-third of the councillors described their views as centre-left, 15% as right-wing and 6% as left-wing. 45% of councillors placed themselves in the political centre. There were more liberals (22%) than conservatives (10%).

== Aftermath ==
The elections were rushed in belief that central reforms were obstructed by the local, communist administration. The results were a decisive victory for the Solidarity Civic Committees, and resulted in a near-complete wipeout of the old communist councillors. Nevertheless, newly elected councillors faced a difficult challenge. However, the problem was not only a lack of experience in managing municipal government, where in many cases councillors and members of city councils had to learn everything from scratch, but also the finances of individual cities. Local authorities were given a range of competences, but these were not followed up with adequate financial resources. The perceived incompetence of Solidarity councillors, coupled with national events such as the neoliberal Balcerowicz Plan, contributed to a sharp shift towards left-wing parties in the 1994 Polish local elections, which persisted until the 2006 Polish local elections.

The 1990-1994 local authorities were criticized for lack of division for local development and no clearly defined functions and responsibilities, which also translated into focusing on minor issues. Changing street names and destroying old communist monuments became a common practice, which took a lot of time, energy and at times considerable financial cost. These actions were highly visible and attracted criticism from local population. Additionally, until the end of 1990, local councils had to act within the old financial system, with limited autonomy and heavy budget deficit. After the election, it was estimated that more than 50% of local gminas might go bankrupt without the intervention of the central government. This led to fiscal emphasis starting in late 1990, where local authorities followed the unpopular austerity policies pursued by the central government, including increasing selected fees and charges. A common issue became a sharp increase of rent costs and increase of prices; some communes that were attractive for tourists or located near bordercrossing introduced high fees for visitors. Other communes also their to develop their own economic activity, usually in traditional spheres that were subsidised by authorities, such as housing and transport.

The Polish government was concerned with the disappointingly low turnout, considered ‘a defeat of engagement of local communities’. Later investigation identified two main issues that contributed to the decreased turnout - firstly, voting places were opened until 20:00, which constituted a difficulty for those living outside their permanent residence; secondly, there was no option to vote in municipal units other than one's permanent residence, which meant that students, internal migrants, army conscripts, hospitalized citizens or those on holidays were "deprived of their active electoral right". For the 1994 elections, the government introduced a number of reforms. For next election, a homogenous proportional system with usage of d’Hondt's method or Sainte-Lague's method was implemented, although municipalities up to 15,000 or 20,000 inhabitants retained a mixture of majority and proportional system. Many single-seat constituencies were reformed into constituencies with 2 to 5 seats. A new law also allowed for a dismissal of a local councilor.
