= George Leggett (neo-Nazi) =

George Philip Roland Leggett
- Born: September 20, 1937; The Bronx, New York City, United States
- Other name: George von Licter
- Years active: 1957–1959
- Organization: United Nordic Confederation
- Title: Commander
- Status: Released
- Conviction: 1 count of burglary
- Criminal charges: Burglary and petit larceny
- Penalty: Imprisonment, length of sentence unknown

Details
- Imprisoned at: Elmira Correctional Facility (1959–1962); Clinton Correctional Facility (1962–1963)

United Nordic Confederation
- Leader: George Leggett
- Dates active: late 1957–1958/1959
- Country: United States
- Headquarters: Forest Hills, Queens, New York City
- Ideology: Neo-Nazism; Nordicism; Antisemitism; Anti-Black racism Christian fascism
- Status: Defunct

George Philip Roland Leggett (also referred to as George F. Leggett in sources) is or was an American neo-Nazi militant from the New York City neighborhood of Forest Hills, Queens, who led a small group called the United Nordic Confederation during the late 1950s.

== Early life and start of neo-Nazi activity ==
According to the NYPD, Leggett was born in the Bronx, New York City, while Leggett himself claimed he was born in Germany and that his family was killed during the Second World War, for which he wanted revenge. By 1944, he was living in Forest Hills. Leggett was briefly in the United States Army in 1956, was discharged due to being "unfit for military service", and had some history of psychiatric treatment. In 1957, after running away from home, Leggett lived for a time in Wyoming, where he was arrested for vagrancy.

In late 1957, Leggett established the United Nordic Confederation, an armed group, becoming its "commander", and began using the alias "George von Licter". The New York Times described the core group as consisting of 12 Forest Hills youths, although according to both Leggett and the NYPD there were hundreds of other members. Leggett advocated for the deportation of all American Jews and Black Americans to Israel and Africa, respectively. Members of the United Nordic Confederation were required to sign an oath dedicating their lives to racial purification and the restoration of the "moral strength, spiritual greatness and physical perfection which make up the true Nordic", and pledged to "be superior in all things beginning with Christianity, humanity, philosophy and science". According to Thomas M. Konda, Leggett's group was part of a broader network of American neo-Nazi and racist groups that included Karl Allen Jr.’s White Party of America and Robert DePugh’s Minutemen, among others.

== Planned bank robbery, arrest, and imprisonment ==
Under Leggett's direction, the United Nordic Confederation plotted to rob a bank in the adjacent Kew Gardens neighborhood, with the intention of seizing $20,000 to $40,000 for the establishment of a neo-Nazi training camp in upstate New York State. On 17 January 1958, the NYPD carried out a surprise dawn raid in which Leggett and four other members were arrested, hours before the robbery was set to go ahead. Following the raid and other mass arrests, the group effectively ceased to function.

The FBI entered the case on 20 January and said it was seeking out sympathizers of the group outside of New York State. While his court case was ongoing, Leggett was arrested again on 27 October 1958 for distributing advertisements for a presumably neo-Nazi publication called "Right". On 3 December 1958, Leggett was convicted on four counts of burglary and three of petit larceny. On 28 January 1959, a judge revised Leggett's conviction to one count of burglary and a suspended sentence for the other six counts– stating that a lengthy prison term would do him "no good" in terms of rehabilitation– and sentenced Leggett to an indeterminate period at Elmira Correctional Facility.

In November 1960, Leggett and the United Nordic Confederation were mentioned in a United Nations Economic and Social Council report on contemporary antisemitism, in a section discussing neo-Nazi youth organizations in the United States.

For unknown reasons, Leggett's inmate card conflicts with contemporary reporting and lists his criminal act as theft from three apartments, with his motivation listed as none. It also reports that he was transferred from Elmira to Clinton Correctional Facility in 1962, and that during his prison sentence he read books on Nazism and race, while also being frequently subjected to disciplinary action for a variety of offenses. Leggett was released from prison on 1 August 1963, after which nothing more of his life is known.

== See also ==
- White supremacy in the United States
- List of neo-Nazi organizations
