= Paraguayan National Socialist Party =

Paraguayan National Socialist Party Partido Nacional Socialista Paraguayo
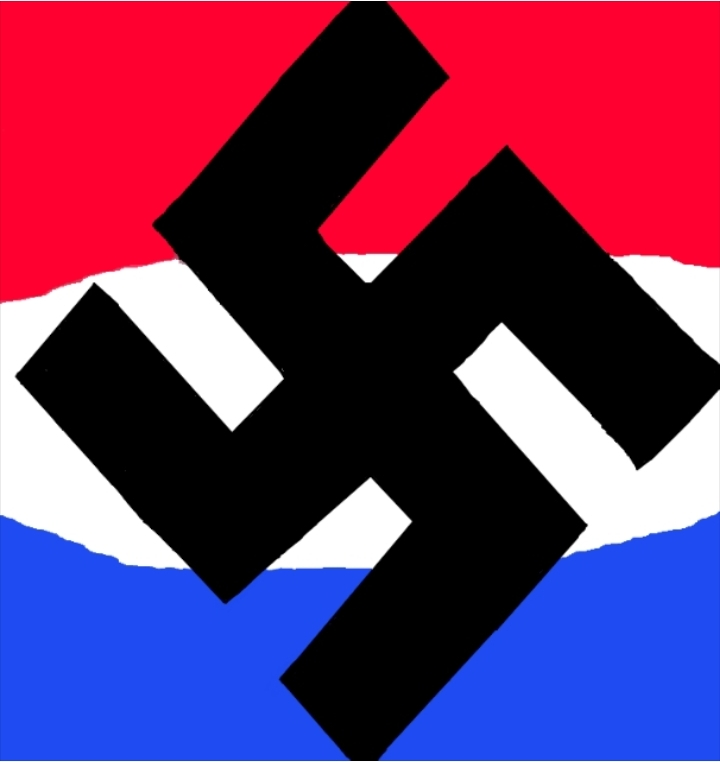
- Founded: 1928; 1989 (Re-founded)
- Headquarters: Asunción, Paraguay
- Ideology: Nazism; Anti-Semitism; White separatism
- Political position: Far-right

Party flag

The Paraguayan National Socialist Party (Spanish: Partido Nacional Socialista Paraguayo; Guarani: Paraguái Retã Irũjoarape Jokuaikuaa Aty) is a political party in Paraguay, which, according to official data, had little political life. However, there are records that in 1928 it was founded in Colonia Independencia, Guairá Department, thus achieving the first Nazi party founded in America, with no date or expiration data.

== Background ==
It was re-registered in 1989, only months after the Stroessner dictatorship was overthrown. At that historical moment, the requirements to institutionalize a political party were minimal due to the urgent need to regularize the opposition political forces that had been kept illegal by the military regime. There was much controversy surrounding the legalization of a political group of Nazi ideology, but beyond the debate, neither its activism nor its political action had a major impact on the political dynamics of the country.

In the May 1993 elections, it ran with list 8, with the Ibáñez-García coalition as candidates, obtaining around 0.05% of the votes, thus confirming its null incidence in Paraguayan politics.

Presently, there exists a movement known as National Socialist Paraguay (PNS, as per its Spanish acronym), with no relevance in national politics.
