= Carecas do ABC =

Brazilian skinhead group

Carecas do ABC ("ABC region Skinheads" in Portuguese) is a Brazilian skinhead group based in the ABC region, in the metropolitan area of São Paulo. The ABC region includes the industrial cities of Santo André, São Bernardo do Campo and São Caetano do Sul. The group accepts Afro-Brazilian members. In their blog, they declare that they are not fascists but nationalists and anti-communists. They do use the swastika and the particular greeting "Heil, Hitler". Members of the group have been accused of several murders in São Paulo's downtown, including the murder of dog trainer and gay man Edson Néris da Silva,who was beaten to death by the gang.

Carecas do ABC emerged in 1987 as a dissident from the group Carecas do Subúrbio. The group currently has 250 members and is not as active as before. The group became known for fighting in the 1980s and 1990s.
