= Nasyonal Aktivite ve Zinde İnkişaf =

Defunct Turkish political association

National Activity and Vigorous Development Nasyonal Aktivite ve Zinde İnkişaf
- Abbreviation: NAZİ
- Founded: 1969
- Dissolved: 1975
- Preceded by: Republican Villagers Nation Party
- Succeeded by: Nationalist Movement Party
- Ideology: Neo-Nazism; Pan-Turkism
- Political position: Far-right

Party flag
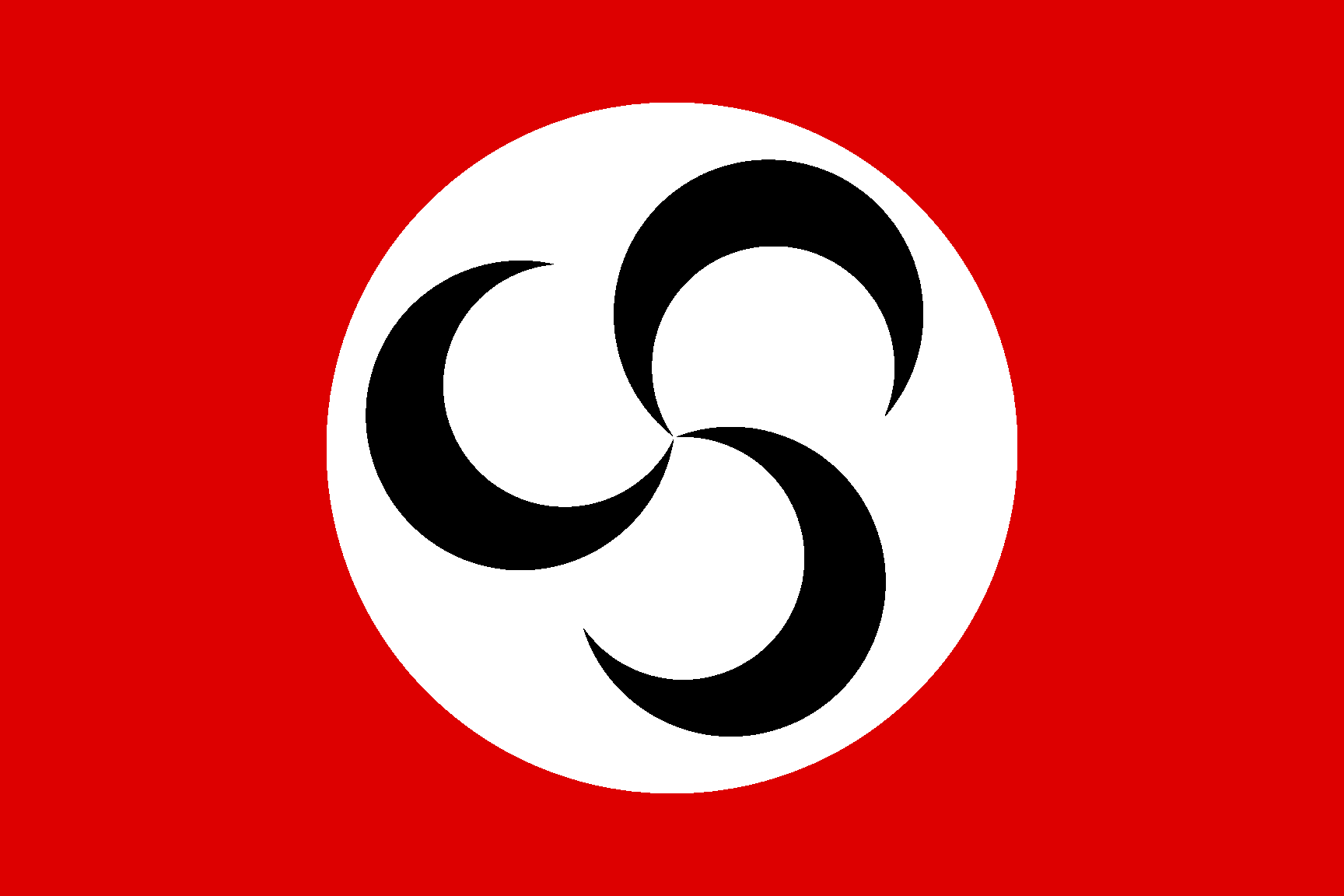

The National Activity and Vigorous Development (Turkish: Nasyonal Aktivite ve Zinde İnkişaf) was a neo-Nazi and Pan-Turkist political association formed in İzmir, Turkey in 1969 by a group of former Republican Villagers Nation Party (CKMP) members. The club maintained two combat units. The members wore SA uniforms and used the Hitler salute. One of the leaders, Gündüz Kapancıoğlu, was re-admitted to the Nationalist Movement Party (MHP) in 1975. A few days later, the association merged with the MHP and abolished itself. The association was relatively small, with an estimated 20 members at its peak in 1969.

== See also ==
- Xenophobia and discrimination in Turkey
- 2024 Eskişehir stabbing
- Attempted assassination of Pope John Paul II
