= German Heathen Front =

Inactive Neo-Nazi group

Flag of the Deutsche Heidnische Front with the Lebensrune and Todesrune and Wotan's eye

Deutsche Heidnische Front (DHF or German Pagan' Front) was a far right Neo-Nazi group created in 1998 as the German section of the Heathen Front. It was formed by avowed neo-Nazi Hendrik Möbus. It has been inactive since 2005.

== Development ==
The group was established in 1998 in an attempt to forge close links between the Pagan and far right nationalist scenes in Germany. It was the German branch of the Allgermanische Heidnische Front, an international Odalist movement. The group, which recruited widely in the skinhead and heavy metal scenes, set up groups across Germany, although its main area of activity was Thuringia. Followers of Germany's black metal scene were the main target group for recruitment.

In 2001 the group had a change of leadership and, alongside this, sought to publicly redefine its ideological stance. Although continuing to express nationalistic views and extol the virtues of the Aryan race they used more moderate language and moved away from expressions of neo-Nazism.

== Self-description and ideology ==
The group seeks to restore an ancient Germanic religion, although it breaks from those other pagan groups who do not include a strong völkisch core to this. The members believe that their actions are driven by Norse mythology and as such it belongs to the same tradition as the Völkisch movements, the Thule Society and elements within the Nazi Party. Strongly anti-Semitic, the DHF has been driven by the Fourteen Words of David Lane.

== Structure ==
The DHF structure is based around freely associated Gaue or districts. Within these districts celebrations are organized at traditional sites, particularly at solstice time. A summer solstice festival held in Kyffhäuserkreis in 2002 was mentioned in a report by the Office for the Protection of the Constitution as the site was used for similar festivities by the SS. The group publishes a magazine, Tuisto, which deals with pagan, cultural and historical themes.

== See also ==
- Neo-Nazism in Germany
