= Heathen Front =

Defunct neo-Nazi organization

Flag of the All-Germanic Heathen Front with a Lebensrune (SS-rune)

The Allgermanische Heidnische Front (AHF) was an international neo-Nazi organisation, active during the late 1990s and early 2000s, that espoused a form of racial Germanic Neopaganism. It grew from the Norsk Hedensk Front (NHF), which was claimed to be led and founded by the musician Varg Vikernes in 1993, although he and the organisation denied it. The program was based on his first book, Vargsmål (1994), published shortly after he was convicted for church arson and the murder of fellow musician Euronymous.

== Formation and Vikernes association ==
Norsk Hedensk Front (Norwegian Heathen Front) was founded in 1993. Its program was based on Vargsmål (1994), a book by Norwegian black metal musician Varg Vikernes. It was written shortly after he was convicted for church arson and the murder of Euronymous as a rebuttal to the media. Swedish scholar Mattias Gardell states in his 2003 book Gods of the Blood that Vikernes launched the Heathen Front through which he advocated "national socialism, anti-Semitism, eugenics and racist paganism." The Encyclopedia of White Power (2000) said that Vikernes was the "self-proclaimed leader" of the Norwegian Heathen Front and the historian Nicholas Goodrick-Clarke mentioned that Vikernes underlined "his role as chieftain of his Norwegian Heathen Front" with the writing of Vargsmål, "formulat[ing] his heathen ideology using material from Norse mythology combined with occult National Socialism". As of 1999, Heathen Front's website was selling Vargsmål.

The Heathen Front denied that Vikernes was in charge. According to the 2003 book Lords of Chaos, Vikernes' direct involvement with the group is difficult to ascertain, and speculated that the denial may have been to protect him, as Norwegian prisoners were prohibited from leading political groups. In addition, the organization's listed address was the same PO box Vikernes used in prison, which the authors state would have made it "very hard for him [Vikernes] to do an effective job" at leading the organization, as all letters would have been screened by the prison personnel. In a 2009 interview with Norwegian newspaper Dagbladet, Vikernes stated: "I have never formed or been a member of such organisations".

== International spread ==
Flag of the Russian Heathen Front with a Lebensrune

The Norwegian Heathen Front soon became the Allgermanische Heidnische Front (AHF), a network of organizations in different countries. The Swedish Heathen Front (Svensk Hednisk Front) was a small group formed around 1996. The German chapter, Deutsche Heidnische Front, was founded in 1998 by Hendrik Möbus. In 2001, the AHF claimed chapters in Norway, Sweden, Denmark, the Netherlands, Germany, the United States, Canada, Russia and Flanders. There was also a short-lived English Heathen Front closely associated during its inception with the British Movement but later linked by Searchlight, the anti-fascist monthly, to Tom Gowers, an officer of the British National Party based in the East Midlands, and to the militant odinist group Woden's Folk.

== Ideology ==
The organization described its specific ideas as "Odalism", derived from the SS-rune Odal. This movement rejected conventional academic research on history and archaeology, instead interpreting Germanic mythology as esoterically transmitted via ancestry.

The Heathen Front espoused neo-Nazism, white supremacism and antisemitism. A 2001 report by the Stephen Roth Institute for the Study of Contemporary Antisemitism and Racism describes the Svensk Hednisk Front (Swedish Heathen Front – SHF) as "an emerging Nazi organization" with an ideology blending "Odinism, anti-Christianity and antisemitism."

== Closure ==
The organisation with time became a forum for neo-Nazis and heathen nationalists. In 2005 the Allgermanische Heidnische Front was closed down. Its members spread to other organisations.

== See also ==
- Odinism
- Social Darwinism
- Traditionalist School
