= Danish Front =

Danish Front (Dansk Front in Danish) was an extreme right, nationalist network in Denmark, whose goal was to "keep Denmark for the Danish people", thus they were also against multiculturalism and "alien religions" such as Islam.

The phenomenon known as Dansk Front consisted of:

- An organization that united many extreme right radicals.
- A homepage that consisted of nationalistic messages and propaganda. The homepage also functioned as an online forum.
- A slogan ("Danish Front!") that was used in graffiti, t-shirts, stickers and such, both for Dansk Front and other extreme right radicals.

Their homepage tried to portray the Danish Front as a new, popular racist concept, but many saw them as neo-nazis. The leaders of Danish Front discouraged members from using swastikas and other traditional nazi symbols to express their views.

Members of this organization also used violence to further their goals.

A number of members of Danish Front had previously been members of Dansk Folkeparti or Dansk Folkepartis Ungdom but had been expelled from those political parties.

== Controversial surroundings ==
- In their yearly review the Danish Security Intelligence Service (Politiets Efterretningstjeneste) found that Danish Front had cooperated with groups such as Blood & Honour and the English terrorist group Combat 18.
- Danish Front had collaborated with Combat 18 and Blood & Honour, as well as with Swedish radical nationalist groups, and marched with them in Salem during 2005.

== Dissolution ==
The organization was dissolved on 19 July 2007.
