= Besseres Hannover =

Right-wing extremist group from Lower Saxony

Besseres Hannover ("Better Hanover") was a right-wing extremist group from Lower Saxony. The group was banned in September 2012 by Lower Saxony's Interior Minister Uwe Schünemann. The ban became incontestable by order of the Federal Administrative Court of 6 January 2014. It also became known nationwide through the "Abschiebär", a character who appeared in propaganda videos and at various events in Germany.

== History ==
The association had been under observation by the Lower Saxony security authorities since the end of 2008. It consisted of a loose association from Hanover and the surrounding area. Thirty club members were known to the authorities, including a former chairman of the NPD in Hannover. They participated in various far-right demonstrations and events. As "immortals", the right-wing extremists marched through Hanover-Kleefeld in the summer of 2011 while carrying torches; the police identified a participant as a member of Besseres Hannover. Their statements appeared on Internet sites (also with music download offers), in the magazine Bock – The mouthpiece of the counterculture, which was distributed to schools, as well as in leaflets, banners and stickers in public spaces. Above all, in the area around the Altenbekener Damm underground station, used daily by several thousand students, they repeatedly posted a variety of mostly xenophobic stickers. During the CEBIT exhibition in 2012, a large banner was hung over the Messeschnellweg. The core of their propaganda was the fight against "alienation" and democracy, with statements such as "The Democrats bring us national death!". The organization's modern action-oriented concept deliberately targeted young right-wing extremists.

In December 2011, an advertising figure was introduced - the Abschiebär, a pun on "Abschieber" (deportator) and "Bär" (bear). Several bear costumes were used in various campaigns of the association. In self-produced short films, which were available on various video portals, ethnic minority people living in Germany were invited to return to their countries of origin. In the best-known film, a Turkish kebab shop employee in south Hanover was unknowingly involved as an actor. Because the bear actor in another scene raises his arm in a Nazi salute, the public prosecutor's office in Hanover has initiated proceedings for "use of marks of unconstitutional organizations" (§ 86a StGB). A member of Better Hanover sent emails with the linked video to various Lower Saxony politicians, including the Lower Saxony Minister of Integration Aygül Özkan. At the open day of Schwerin Castle in June 2012, the parliamentary faction of the NPD appeared together with the Abschiebär.

The association worked together with the Thiazi Forum, the Hanoverian far-right rock band Nordfront and the Brandenburg Spreelichtern.

The association was described in July 2012 by the Lower Saxony Ministry of the Interior as "the most active neo-Nazi grouping in Lower Saxony". Besseres Hannover was proscribed on 25 September 2012, based on the offence of formation of a criminal organization (an offence outlawed by Section§ 129 of the German Criminal Code). Between the beginning of the observation in 2008 and the 2012 ban, authorities initiated a total of 24 criminal investigations related to Better Hannover against known or unknown persons, mostly related to propaganda offences. As a "formative club mark", any public use of the Abschiebär was prohibited.

Due to the ban, the website of the association was turned off, and its official Twitter account blocked. In this case, the social network first made use of its ability to block profiles only in a specific country (country-specific shutdown).

Attorney Udo Vetter applied for judicial review against the ban order on behalf of a former member. The action was dismissed by the Higher Administrative Court of Lüneburg by judgment of 3 September 2013. The appeal was denied. By order of the Federal Administrative Court of 6 January 2014, which dismissed the complaint against the refusal to approve the appeal on law of 7 November 2013, the prohibition has become final.

A former member faced criminal proceedings in the Springe District Court in 2015 in respect of several attacks on party offices, damage to a kebab shop and to a plaque for a synagogue destroyed by the Nazis.

== Abschiebär ==
The Abschiebär was the national project of the action Besseres Hannover against the current immigration to the Federal Republic of Germany (FRG). The Abschiebär is an always smiling brown bear of human size, which is clothed only with a white t-shirt. He also appeared on the Day of the German Future 2012 in Hamburg.
