= Azure Party =

Defunct fascist pro-Nazi party in Iran

- Founder: Ḥabib-Allāh Nowbaḵt
- Founded: 1942
- Dissolved: 1953
- Ideology: Fascism; Nazism
- Political position: Far-right
- Colors: Black

The Azure Party (Persian: حزب کبود, romanized: Hezb-e kabud), nicknamed the Iranian Nazi Party and the Black Shirts (Persian: سیاه‌پوشان, romanized: Siahpushan), was a fascist party in Iran with Germanophile and pro-Nazi Germany tendencies.

The party was founded by Ḥabib-Allāh Nowbaḵt. Other notable figures reportedly affiliated with the party were Fazlollah Zahedi and Shams Qanatabadi.
