= New Order (Germany) =

German neo-Nazi group

The New Order (NO) (German Neue Ordnung) is a German neo-Nazi group recruited from both the Reichsbürger movement and armed neo-Nazism. The founder and head of the group is neo-Nazi Meinolf Schönborn. In 2013, the federal prosecutor's office in Karlsruhe investigated members of the NO for founding a terrorist organization.

== History ==
=== Foundation ===
NO founder Meinolf Schönborn was chairman and leader of the Nationalist Front (NF), which was banned at the end of 1992 and was one of the most important cadre organizations of neo-Nazism in Germany in the 1990s. The reason for the ban on the NF was the establishment of a "National Task Force" (NEK), i.e. the preliminary organization of the armed struggle. In 1995 he was sentenced to two years and three months in prison for continuing the banned NF. After he had served these, he tried again and again to build up new armed neo-fascist structures. However, since he had lost contact with the central figures of the scene, Schönborn turned to the Reichscitizens movement, sought contact with Holocoaus denier Ursula Haverbeck and continued to hold comradeship meetings.

=== Activities ===
The NO is particularly active in Brandenburg and Berlin; according to Berliner Zeitung, however, there are also activities in Thuringia. At right-wing demonstrations, NO members tried to win supporters for their group.

Schönbarn died of heart failure in March 2012. At the site of his body, the police found three sharp weapons, one with a telescopic sight and more than 300 rounds of ammunition, belonging to his political companion Jörg Lange.

This find was followed by raids in Berlin, Brandenburg and North Rhine-Westphalia, where the group was particularly active. The group's propaganda materials were also seized. The public prosecutor's office in Neuruppin investigated five members for forming an armed group and violating the Weapons Act. The federal prosecutor's office in Karlsruhe later got involved and investigated Meinolf Schönborn and four other NO members on suspicion of founding a terrorist organization.
