= National Self-Defence Front =

National Self-Defence Front Front Narodowej Samoobrony
- Abbreviation: FNS
- Leader: Janusz Bryczkowski
- Founded: 1994
- Dissolved: 1995
- Split from: SRP
- Headquarters: Nowy Świat 19/35, 00-029 Warsaw
- Membership (1994): 1,000
- Ideology: Neofascism; Russophilia; Pan-Slavism
- Political position: Far-right
- Colours: Black
- Sejm: 0 / 460
- Senate: 0 / 100
- European Parliament: 0 / 51
- Regional assemblies: 0 / 552
- City presidents: 0 / 117

National Self-Defence Front (Polish: Front Narodowej Samoobrony, FNS), also known as the Polish National Front (Polish: Polski Front Narodowy, PFN) was a Polish extreme nationalist political party active between 1994 and 1995. The party leader was Janusz Bryczkowski. It was related to the skinhead subculture and recruited members of the subculture to its fascist military group. It was founded by Bryczkowski after he was expelled from Self-Defence of the Republic of Poland (Polish: Samoobrona Rzeczpospolitej Polskiej, SRP) after his unsuccessful attempt to oust the party's leader, Andrzej Lepper, from power.

The FNS openly called for fascism and attracted media attention by its incendiary statements. The organisation became particularly notorious in September 1995, when its members and sympathisers, forming a militia called the Polish Legion, took part in a 'cleansing' action in Legionowo, directed mainly against the homeless. It resulted in two dead and around 30 wounded. The perpetrators were sentenced to 25 and 15 years' imprisonment, and the police effectively dissolved the party by cracking down on its activities and arresting its members. It was promptly dissolved afterwards.

== History ==
The party was founded as a mutation of Wojciech Podjacki's National Polish Front. The Polish National Front was established at the beginning of 1994 as the National Self-Defence Front, founded by a group of Self-Defence of the Republic of Poland (SRP) activists in opposition to Andrzej Lepper, who were united by their activity in the Patriotic Association "Grunwald". The Polish National Front was subordinated to the youth organisation Legion Polski, which carried out activities of a militant nature.

Before joining Samoobrona, Bryczkowski was a co-founder of the Polish Ecological Party (Polish: Polska Partia Ekologiczna), and later founded the Polish Green Party (PPZ) after a split in the Polish Ecological Party. Bryczkowski was a candidate in the 1990 Polish presidential election and the 1991 Polish parliamentary election as the PPZ candidate.

After Lepper was arrested for participating in an illegal farmer strike, Bryczkowski attempted to oust him from the leadership of the SRP. However, the move failed and Bryczkowski was expelled of the party, along with the small nationalist wing loyal to him. After his expulsion, the SRP dismissed its right-wing supporters and gradually abandoned its big-tent protest character in favour of becoming an established, far-left party.

In early 1994, Echo Dnia interviewed Lepper's party deputy leader Piotr Skórski, who disavowed Bryczkowski and called him a "political scammer". According to SRP, Bryczkowski initially tried to register his party as National Front "Self-Defence" (Polish: Narodowy Front "Samoobrona"), but SRP filed a formal complaint to the court which forced Bryczkowski to choose a different name - National Self-Defence Front. Skórski also stated that contrary to his claims, Bryczkowski was never the vice-president of SRP; Skórski also criticized Bryczkowski's ties with Zhirinovsky.

Initially, Bryczkowski and his party were compared to Stanisław Tymiński and his Party X. Political commentators also argued that Bryczkowski seeks to become the "Polish Zhirinovsky". Bryczkowski himself claimed that his party was joined by many former Samoobrona members. The party participated in the 1994 Polish local elections under three names - "National Self-Defence Forum" (Polish: Forum Narodowe Samoobrona), "FN Samoobrona", and "FNS". It fielded candidates in two voivodeships, winning 122 votes in total - it failed to get any seats in the local assemblies.

The FNS aroused a lot of controversy, mainly due to the statements of its leader Janusz Bryczkowski ("Democracy should be replaced by a dictatorship based on fascism, because nobody has come up with anything better", "I am a national socialist and I am taking up a fight against this Jewish system, which has not yet been dreamt of in this country"). Vladimir Zhirinovsky came to Poland at the invitation of the party.

The National Self-Defence Front ran in the 1993 Polish parliamentary election, winning 565 votes, which accounted for 0.01% of the popular vote. The party had 1000 members by 1994, composed of mostly students and young unemployed men.

The biggest scandal related to the FNS took place in September 1995, when, after a camp on Lake Śniardwy, three activists of the Legion of Youth beat up about thirty homeless people in Legionowo, two of whom died. The operation was called an "action to purge the town of incomplete elements" by the party, and sparked police crackdown on the activities of the FNS. In 1998, the court sentenced two of the perpetrators to 25 and the third to 15 years' imprisonment. The Legionowo event resulted in the Polish Legion activists being cut off from Bryczkowski and, consequently, in the dissolution of the party.

== Election results ==
=== Sejm ===
Election	Votes	%	Seats	+/–
1993	565	0.01	0 / 460	New

=== Regional assemblies ===
Election	# of votes	Seats	+/–
1994	122	0 / 2,468	New

== Ideology ==
The party was described as a neofascist, Russophilic and a Pan-Slavic organisation. The ideology of the party was mainly shaped by the statements of its leader Janusz Bryczkowski, who shocked the 1990s Polish public by statements such as "Democracy should be replaced by a dictatorship based on fascism" and "I am a National Socialist and I am taking up a fight against this Jewish system that has not yet been dreamt of in the whole country". The party was trying to form an irregular fascist militias and recruited members amongst the skinhead community. The activities of the party quickly came to an end following the Śniardwy incident, which sparked police crackdown on the organisation.

The formulated program of the party argued that "without fascism, automatons, gulags and death camps, our country will not move forward" and that "enslaving an individual for the good of society would not be reprehensible". Bryczkowski also stated that "in order to establish legal order in Poland, one needs to execute a million people". The party promoted its acquaintance with Russian nationalists and defended anti-Polish statements of some far-right Russian nationalists such as Zhirinovsky.

The party was pan-Slavist, and the leader of the party was accused of being an "agent of Moscow", to which he replied that he is one "with pride". The party had contacts with fellow far-right parties in Russia, and arranged a heavily publicized meeting of its party members with Vladimir Zhirinovsky in 1994.

== See also ==
- Self-Defence of the Republic of Poland
- Self-Defence of the Polish Nation
- Patriotic Self-Defense
- League of Polish Families
