= Albanian Third Position =

Albanian Third Position Pozicioni i Tretë Shqiptar
- Founded: 5 May 2019
- Ideology: Neo-Nazism; Greater Albania; Anti-communism; Third Positionism; Islamophobia; Anti-Turkish sentiment Anti-Arab racism Anti-Kurdish sentiment Anti-egalitarianism; Right-wing antiglobalism Blood and soil Anti-liberalism
- Political position: Far-right
- Religion: Albanian paganism
- Ethnic group: Albanians
- Location: Albania, Kosovo, Northern Macedonia, Montenegro

Party flag

Website
- Archived 2025-10-18 at the Wayback Machine

Albanian Third Position (Albanian: Pozicioni i Tretë Shqiptar) abbreviated ATP, is an Albanian neo-Nazi traditionalist movement that has been active since 2019.

== Background ==
According to British anti-hate advocacy group Hope not Hate, ATP emerges from an atmosphere of appreciation for Nazi and fascist occupation because it unified Albania, Kosovo, Northern Macedonia and Montenegro. Established intellectuals in Albania have underscored the positive consequences of fascism as it aligned with the goals of Greater Albania movement.

== Ideology ==
ATP opposes democracy, egalitarianism and communism and adheres to the Traditionalist ideas of Julius Evola. ATP believes in the Great Replacement and uses fascist and Nazi insignia. ATP is inspired by Nuclei Armati Rivoluzionari neo-fascist terrorist group.

=== Greater Albania ===
ATP adheres to the idea of Greater Albania, and Balkan Insight quotes their aspirations as:

We do not want two or more Albanian states, we want the centralization of power and the Albanian nation. The dream for which the KLA [Kosovo Liberation Army] martyrs gave their lives was not a cloth with stars, but tradition, the flag and the Albanian spirit. Democracy, liberalism and globalism have trashed the aspirations and efforts of Albanians over the centuries. Let's run towards unification, and not towards international democratic holidays, which have nothing to do with the Albanian ideal.

The Albanian state, according to them, must be an ethnic state that unites the people through racial affiliation and maintaining the race and blood is the most fundamental principle. ATP angrily denounced Prime Minister Avdullah Hoti as a lackey of America and Zionism when he signed an agreement with Serbia's Aleksandar Vučić to end border disputes in the Western Balkans.

=== Hooliganism ===
ATP has overlapping membership with football hooligan ultra clubs, and ATP supporters are also members of Tirana football hooligan groups in Albania, Tetovo in Northern Macedonia and Kosovo. ATP has shared pictures of Tirana Fanatiks club members doing a group Nazi salute.

=== Paganism ===
ATP views the Abrahamic religions as universalist and thus parallel to globalism and an encroachment of Arab, and Turkish influence. ATP has a subgroup called Pagan Shqiptar (Albanian Pagan) which adheres to Albanian neopaganism. They feel that a return to paganism will help to reinstill cultural values of their Illyrian ancestors.

=== Activities ===
The ATP is active across Albania and neighboring regions, including Kosovo, Northern Macedonia, and Montenegro, engaging in activities such as celebrating pagan festivals, hiking, sticker and poster campaigns, and graffiti.

The ATP have also been seen with other right-wing adjacent groups in Europe, most notably on 24 August 2024 when they were invited to the Nation Europa conference, which was attended by various right-wing and nationalist groups across Europe. Within these groups it seems the ATP holds closest relations with Avantgard, BNU, and CasaPound.

During the Russo-Ukrainian War, a number of Albanian volunteers joined Ukrainian forces. Among them were individuals reportedly linked to ATP, who were observed alongside members of the Avantgard group in Ukraine. In 2024, an individual associated with Albanian Third Position reportedly traveled to Ukraine to participate in the war effort. He was later killed in combat while serving with the Azov Brigade.
