= White Noise Movement =

The White Noise Movement (Georgian: თეთრი ხმაურის მოძრაობა) is a political group founded in 2015 in the Republic of Georgia focused on drug decriminalization.
