= Militia (Italian neo-Nazi group) =

Militia (Italian: Milizia) is an Italian neo-Nazi group founded by Maurizio Boccacci, the former leader of the banned Western Political Movement.

The group first came to attention in 2008 when Boccacci was prosecuted over antisemitic and Holocaust denialist graffiti.

Further prosecutions in 2010 followed raids against the group, prompted by further antisemitic graffiti which had been put up in response to statements by political and religious leaders supporting the continued existence of Israel. Among the items seized in the raids were machetes, baseball bats, an Israeli Army uniform, and tools used for painting graffiti.

Boccacci and four other members were arrested in December 2011 by the Special Operations Group of the Italian Carabinieri. The group had made threats against Riccardo Pacifici, President of Rome's Jewish community, Gianni Alemanno, Mayor of Rome, Gianfranco Fini, President of the Chamber of Deputies, and Renato Schifani, President of the Italian Senate. They are believed to have plotted a bombing targeting Pacifici.
