= Antisemitism in Sweden =

The Jewish community in Sweden has been prevalent since the 18th century. Today Sweden has a Jewish community of around 20,000, which makes it the 7th largest in the European Union. Antisemitism in historical Sweden primarily manifested as the confiscation of property, restrictions on movement and employment, and forced conversion to Christianity. Antisemitism in present-day Sweden is mainly perpetrated by far-right politicians, neo-Nazis, and Islamists.

== History ==
=== Early history of Jews in Sweden ===
Jews have been permitted to reside in Sweden since the late 18th century. Prior to this, Jews were sought after as teachers of Hebrew in the universities, but the condition for being appointed to the teaching post was that they convert to Lutheranism. Lutheran Protestantism was the state religion (since the 16th century) and the only accepted religion. Opposition was strong against other faiths, especially Catholicism.

Jews required capital of 2000 riksdalers to obtain a letter of protection (skyddsbrev). This included the value of clothes, household gadgets and inventory, regular payments made for upkeep, cash and promissory notes. After the application has been made to the magistrate, the applicant would be given the status of Husbonde and could legally support himself with the trade or business he had chosen.

The status of skyddsjude derived from German schutzjude and the legislation in the 18th century regulating Jews in Sweden was put together after the Parliamentary Constitutional Committee (Konstitutionsuttskottet) had obtained copies of the German laws regulating Jews in Saxony, Prussia and other German kingdoms and duchies. It was discussed in committee whether Jews should wear a distinguishing mark when walking in the street – perhaps a red or yellow hatband, but this idea was rejected. Poor Jews were subject to deportation, pursuant to a law banning Romani people, tight rope dancers and sellers of barometers.

A large number of restrictions were placed on Jews, including restriction to towns: Stockholm, Gothenburg, Norrköping and Landskrona: Jews could not reside or own property in the countryside: this restriction was first removed in 1854. In 1870 Jews received full citizens' rights and the first Jewish members of the Riksdag, Aron Philipson and Moritz Rubenson, were elected in 1872. However Swedish non-Protestants, most of which were Catholics and Jews, were still not allowed to teach the subject of Christianity in public schools or to be cabinet ministers (statsråd) (these restrictions were not removed until 1 January 1953).

During the early 1900s, the journalist Mauritz Rydgren planned an antisemitic broadsheet. Barthold Lundén published such a newspaper, named Vidi, between 1919 and 1931. In 1923, Lundén also founded the Swedish Antisemitic Union (Svenska Antisemitiska Föreningen; SAF).

=== Fascists, Nazis and the Holocaust ===
Several Swedish fascist and Nazi parties, formed during the 1920s and 1930s, were generally strongly antisemitic and/or grew out of the milieu of the Antisemitic Union (even though it was formally dissolved in 1931).

On 22 January 1932, the largest of these parties, the Svenska nationalsocialistiska partiet (Swedish National Socialist Party) held its first public rally, when Birger Furugård addressed an audience of 6,000 at the Haymarket in Stockholm. The peak in popularity for Swedish Nazis came in the municipal elections of 1934 when Nazi parties were victorious in over 100 electoral contests.

During 1933–39, some 3,000 Jews migrated to Sweden to escape persecution in Nazi Germany. Because Sweden was neutral during World War II, it became a place of asylum for Jews from occupied Europe: in 1942, 900 Norwegian Jews were given asylum from Nazi persecution and, in October 1943, almost the entire Danish Jewish community, some 8,000 people, was transported to Sweden (see Rescue of the Danish Jews). Swedish diplomat Raoul Wallenberg also saved thousands of Hungarian Jews in Budapest by providing them with "protective passports". He also rented 32 buildings, funded by the United States, and declared them Swedish diplomatic facilities, thus bringing them under protection of diplomatic immunity.

Following the war, Swedish Nazis remained strongly antisemitic; as early as May 1945 became early adopters of Holocaust denial. During the immediate post-war period, far right parties were relatively inactive politically. The fascist Nysvenska Rörelsen (NSR, New Swedish Movement, formed in 1941 as Svensk Opposition) attempted to distance itself from its own history and Nazi Germany. The NSR cultivated ties to similar organizations in other countries and established an employment office in Malmö for expatriate Danes and Norwegians who had fled to Sweden after collaborating with wartime German occupation forces.

In 1956, a new Swedish Nazi party, the Nordiska Rikspartiet (NRP; "Nordic Reich Party"), was formed. It had a paramilitary faction called the National Action Group (RAG, Riksaktiongruppen), and several of its members were convicted of assaults and threats (in the late 1980s one of the RAG activists was selected as chair of the newly formed Sweden Democrats).

There was a so-called "Swastika epidemic" in 1960, when the painting of swastikas spread rapidly in many countries. US rabbi Max Nussbaum alleged that the swastika-painting campaign was led from Malmö by Per Engdahl. Engdahl denied this and claimed that the NSR was the victim of a conspiracy by the World Jewish Congress and that Jews themselves were behind the swastikas. From the middle of the 1960s, the NSR membership and contributions dropped, and the party languished (with the exception of a few high-profile events).

=== Neo-Nazis, white supremacists and white nationalists ===
From the late 1980s, new far right groups espousing antisemitic belief emerged in Sweden. These groups are linked largely by the NRP. In its magazine, Storm, the party stated an ambition to collect all the "race-conscious whites". These groups included White Aryan Resistance (1991–93), National Socialist Front (dissolved in 2008) and Legion Wasa (inactive since around 2010).

Sweden remains home to active neo-Nazi or white supremacist organizations espousing antisemitic beliefs, including Nordic Resistance Movement.

=== Developments since 2000 ===
Many commentators regard contemporary antisemitism in Sweden as largely a product of mass migration of Muslims who have brought anti-Jewish attitudes from their countries of origin to Sweden. A government study in 2006 estimated that 15% of Swedes agree with the statement: "The Jews have too much influence in the world today." 5% of the total adult population and 39% of adult Muslims "harbour systematic antisemitic views". The former prime minister Göran Persson described these results as "surprising and terrifying". However, the rabbi of Stockholm's Orthodox Jewish community, Meir Horden, said that "It's not true to say that the Swedes are anti-Semitic. Some of them are hostile to Israel because they support the weak side, which they perceive the Palestinians to be."

In 2010, alleged antisemitism among Muslims in Malmö received media attention after a controversial interview with the then city's mayor, Ilmar Reepalu. In March of the same year, Fredrik Sieradzk of the Jewish community of Malmö told Die Presse, an Austrian newspaper, that Jews are being "harassed and physically attacked" by "people from the Middle East", although he added that only a small number of Malmö's 90,000 Muslims "exhibit hatred of Jews".

The population of Malmö began to decrease in the 1970s due to decline of the once-dominant shipbuilding and textile industries. This also led to a decrease in the Jewish population. Sieradzk has stated that approximately 30 Jewish families have emigrated from Malmö to Israel in the past year, specifically to escape from harassment estimating that the already small Jewish population is shrinking by 5% a year. "Malmö is a place to move away from, right now many Jews in Malmö are really concerned about the situation and don’t believe they have a future here", he said, citing antisemitism as the primary reason. The Malmö Synagogue suffered arson attacks in 2010 and 2012.

The Swedish newspaper Skånska Dagbladet reported that attacks on Jews in Malmö totaled 79 in 2009, about twice as many as the previous year, according to police statistics. In December 2010, the Jewish human rights organization Simon Wiesenthal Center issued a travel advisory concerning Sweden, advising Jews to express "extreme caution" when visiting the southern parts of the country due to an increase in verbal and physical harassment of Jewish citizens in the city of Malmö. However, the leader of the Jewish congregation would have liked the center to consult them before issuing the warning. Fred Khan, the congregation's chairman told Sydvenska Dagbladet suggested that the rise in the crime statistics might not reflect an actual increase in crimes endured by the community over the proceeding year. Members of the congregation do face harassment, but a substantial degree of the incidents remain unreported to the police. In the last year members of the community had been more strongly advised to report all abuse to the police. On 8 June 2012, antisemitic graffiti was spray-painted on the external wall of the old Jewish cemetery in Malmö. The graffiti reads "A PIG" in Swedish (en gris) and a swastika. On 28 September, same year, an explosion occurred at a Malmö Jewish community building.

Since 2014, several members of the Sweden Democrats, a political party represented in the Swedish Riksdag, have been accused of expressing antisemitic views. While the party (founded in 1988) describes itself as social conservative and nationalist, it initially had ties to fascist, white supremacist and other far right groups.

=== Contemporary acts of antisemitism ===
According to CFCA (the Coordination Forum for Countering Antisemitism), antisemitism in Sweden nowadays focuses on the Israeli–Palestinian conflict. A survey conducted by the EU Agency for Fundamental Rights found out that in 2012, 40–50% of Swedish Jews had frequently heard the accusation that "Israelis behave to the Palestinians like the Nazis to the Jews". Moreover, a series of proposed measures in Sweden banning kosher slaughter, ritual circumcision, and possibly even the importation of kosher meat, had caused a Swedish Jewish activist to file for asylum in her own country.

Also In 2012, the President of the European Jewish Congress, Moshe Kantor condemned the behavior of the Swedish Government which according to him is "the only European country that is refusing to discuss the problem of Anti-Semitism prevailing within its borders".

In 2013, a total of ten Antisemitic incidents were reported, including antisemitic statements made publicly by Swedish politicians, swastikas which were drawn on Jewish property and the Slogan "Burn Israel Burn" which was printed on T-shirts.

In 2015 the journal Ethnic and Racial Studies published a research conducted between 2003 and 2009 in secondary school students in Sweden. Its goal was to examine changes in antisemitic attitudes among youngest. The results of the survey showed no significant change in the total level of antisemitism between the two groups of youths (the group of 2003 and the group of 2009). However, addition results imply other differences: In 2003, students living in the big cities of Stockholm, Gothenburg and Malmö have the highest levels of antisemitism, compared to 2009, when students living in smaller municipalities and the countryside have the highest significant levels of antisemitism. More findings showed that in both 2003 and 2009 students born outside of Sweden, or their parents were born outside Sweden, display higher levels of antisemitism compared to students born in Sweden.

In December 2017 a dozen men hurled Molotov cocktails at a synagogue in Gothenburg. No injuries were reported, and those inside the building hid in the basement. The incident followed a pro-Palestinian protest. Two days later, an arson attack took place at a Jewish cemetery.

=== Situation in Malmö since 2009 ===
On 13 January 2009, Molotov cocktails were thrown inside and outside a funeral chapel at the old Jewish cemetery in the city of Malmö, south Sweden, in what seemed to be an antisemitic act. It was the third time the chapel had been attacked in the few weeks before this incident.

In March 2010, Fredrik Sieradzk of the Jewish community of Malmö told Die Presse, an Austrian newspaper, that Jews were being "harassed and physically attacked" by "people from the Middle East", although he added that only a small number of Malmö's 40,000 Muslims "exhibit hatred of Jews". Lea Gleitman, an Auschwitz survivor who had dedicated her life to teaching about the Holocaust, stated that she was being called a liar when teaching about the Holocaust at Muslim-majority schools. Sieradzk also stated that approximately thirty Jewish families had emigrated from Malmö to Israel in the previous year, specifically to escape from harassment, estimating that the already small Jewish population was shrinking by 5 per cent a year. "Malmo is a place to move away from, right now many Jews in Malmö are really concerned about the situation and don’t believe they have a future here", he said, citing antisemitism as the primary reason.

In 2010, The Forward reported on the current state of Jews and the level of antisemitism in Sweden. Henrik Bachner, a writer and professor of history at the University of Lund, claimed that members of the Swedish Parliament had attended anti-Israel rallies where the Israeli flag was burned while the flags of Hamas and Hezbollah were waved, and the rhetoric was often antisemitic—not just anti-Israel. But such public rhetoric had not been branded as hateful and denounced. Charles Small, director of the Yale University Initiative for the Study of Antisemitism, stated that "Sweden is a microcosm of contemporary anti-Semitism. It's a form of acquiescence to radical Islam, which is diametrically opposed to everything Sweden stands for." Per Gudmundson, chief editorial writer for Svenska Dagbladet, has sharply criticized politicians who he claims offer "weak excuses" for Muslims accused of antisemitic crimes. "Politicians say these kids are poor and oppressed, and we have made them hate. They are, in effect, saying the behavior of these kids is in some way our fault."

As of 2010, the Jewish community of Malmö consisted of about 700 individuals, most of whom were descendants of refugees from Poland and Germany during the Second World War. The Swedish newspaper Skånska Dagbladet reported that there had been 79 attacks on Jews in Malmö in 2009, about twice as many as the previous year, according to police statistics. Judith Popinski, an 86-year-old Holocaust survivor, told The Daily Telegraph that she was no longer invited to schools with a large Muslim presence to tell her story of surviving the Holocaust. Popinski, who found refuge in Malmö in 1945, stated that, until recently, she had told her story in Malmö schools as part of their Holocaust studies program, but that now, many schools were no longer asking Holocaust survivors to tell their stories, because Muslim students treated them with such disrespect, either ignoring them or walking out of the class. She further stated that "Malmo reminds me of the anti-Semitism I felt as a child in Poland before the war. I am not safe as a Jew in Sweden any more."

In December 2010, the Simon Wiesenthal Center, a Jewish human rights organization, issued a travel advisory concerning Sweden, advising Jews to express "extreme caution" when visiting the southern parts of the country due to an increase in verbal, physical, and violent harassment of Jews in the city of Malmö.

On 6 September 2012, the international United Nations Watch organization discussed the antisemitic attacks in Malmö and stated it considered the phenomenon extremely serious, given Sweden's candidacy for membership in the UN Human Rights Council. The organization called on Sweden to supply adequate protection for the Jewish community and to develop special initiatives aimed at educating against antisemitism. It also reprimanded Reepalu for what it viewed as his multiple defamatory and incendiary remarks concerning the Jewish community in Malmö and the antisemitism it faces. Moreover, recent articles over the looming attacks on Malmö's Jewish community were published in the Swedish media also during the year of 2012, in particular an attack on a Jewish center on 28 September 2012. In the wake of a report that marked Malmö as a hub for antisemitic actions in Sweden, the discourse further dealt with the inquiry over the roots of that antisemitism, whether linked with classic Jewish-hatred or exacerbated by the prolonged Arab-Israeli conflict.

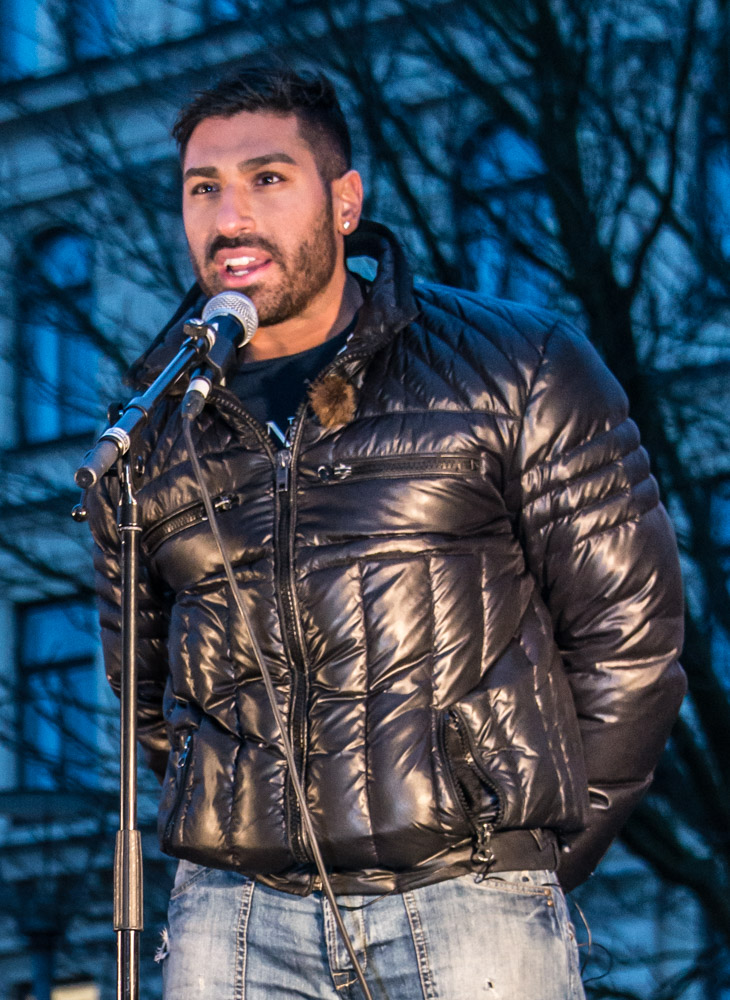
I wanted to build bridges between Jews and Muslims in Malmö because antisemitism is a problem in the city. After that I realised how great the need was to talk about this. Now I work to combat all kinds of xenophobia.—Siavosh Derakhti

In 2013, Siavosh Derakhti, a Swedish-born son of Iranian immigrant parents and founder of Young People Against Anti-Semitism and Xenophobia, received the first Raoul Wallenberg Award, an honor named after the Swedish diplomat who saved thousands of Jews from Nazi death camps during the Second World War. Because of his social activism focused on reducing antisemitism and xenophobia, the selection committee said Derakhti set a "positive example" in his hometown of Malmö and throughout Sweden. On 8 November 2012, the Swedish Committee Against Antisemitism gave Derakhti its first Elsa Award, established by Committee member Henrik Frenkel in memory of his parents "to encourage young people to incorporate social media into the battle against Swedish ant-Semitism".

In December 2017, after president Donald Trump announced that Jerusalem will be recognised as the capital of Israel by the United States, there was a spontaneous demonstration in a central square Möllevångstorget where some 200 people who shouted that "an intifada has been proclaimed from Malmö and we will shoot the Jews". The following day another crowd gathered to shout that "Jews must remember that the army of Muhammad will return". No organiser for the crowd could be identified.

==== 2009 Davis Cup ====
In 2009, Malmö hosted a tennis match between Israel and Sweden during the Davis Cup, after the 2008–2009 Israel–Gaza conflict. The Malmö Municipality politicians were concerned about extremists, and decided due to security reasons to only let a small audience in. However, numerous Swedish politicians had called for the match to be cancelled due to their pro-Palestinian views and the aftermath of the Gaza War, with this idea being discarded because the Swedish side would have had an automatic forfeit loss, and therefore the team's elimination, from the Cup tournament. A plan to move the match from Malmö to Stockholm failed due to logistical issues and a lack of time. In the end, Israel defeated and eliminated the Swedish team by a 3–2 score. The match drew more than 6,000 pro-Palestinian protesters, making it one of the largest demonstrations against Israel in Swedish history. More than 100 protesters were detained as several hundred Arab nationalists and supporters of the far-left clashed with more than 1,000 policemen that were guarding the stadium. Malmö was banned from hosting any further Davis Cup matches in the aftermath of the riots. The city was also fined $25,000 by the International Tennis Federation (lowered to $5,000 on appeal) and forced to pay an additional $15,000 to recoup revenues lost when spectators were barred from the match.

==== Ilmar Reepalu ====
Swedish newspapers and political leaders as well as Israeli media have criticised Malmö's mayor, Ilmar Reepalu (a Social Democrat), for denying the rise of Antisemitism in Malmö.

When confronted with the issue during an interview in 2010 with Andreas Lovén, a journalist in Skånska Dagbladet, Reepalu stated: "We accept neither Zionism nor anti-Semitism. They are extremes that put themselves above other groups, and believe they have a lower value." He also criticized the Malmö's Jewish community for its support for Israel, stating that "I would wish for the Jewish community to denounce Israeli violations against the civilian population in Gaza. Instead it decides to hold a [pro-Israeli] demonstration in the Grand Square [of Malmö], which could send the wrong signals."

Jewish leaders responded that the demonstration Reepalu was referring to was "pro-peace rally" arranged by the Jewish Community in Malmö "which came under attack from members of a violent counter demonstration" and accused Reepalu of "suggesting that the violence directed towards us is our own fault simply because we didn't speak out against Israel".

Reepalu has stated that apart from at the demonstration, there had not been any violent attacks on Jews in the city, by claiming to cite police figures. However, the same police figures show that hate crimes against Jews have doubled over the last year. In January, when asked to explain why Jewish religious services often require security guards and even police protection, Reepalu claimed that the violence directed toward Malmö's Jewish community is from right-wing extremists, and not Muslims.

In an interview with the Sunday Telegraph in February 2010, Reepalu was asked about reports that antisemitism in Malmö has increased to the point that some of its Jewish residents are (or are considering) moving to Israel. Reepalu again denied that there has been any violence directed at Jews in Malmö, stating that:

"There haven't been any attacks on Jewish people, and if Jews from the city want to move to Israel that is not a matter for Malmö."

Reepalu added on Danish television that the criticism against his statement were a product of pro-Israeli lobbyism.

The then leader of the Swedish Social Democratic Party, Mona Sahlin, described Reepalu's comments as "unfortunate". Reepalu's statements have been sharply criticized by Sieradzk, who argued that "More often it's the far-left that commonly use Jews as a punching bag for their disdain toward the policies of Israel, even if Jews in Malmö have nothing to do with Israeli politics."

Reepalu later conceded that he has not been sufficiently informed about the vulnerable situation faced by Jews after meeting with community leaders. Reepalu then claimed that Skånska Dagbladet, the newspaper that initially reported many Reepalu's controversial statements, had misrepresented him as antisemitic; the newspaper was subsequently banned from a press conference at City Hall, reportedly at Reepalu's request. In response, Skånska Dagbladet published on its website the full tapes of its interview with Reepalu, as well as all the texts published in its article series on threats and harassment faced by Malmö Jews, and the exchange of emails between the newspaper and the mayor's office.

In March 2012, Reepalu again came under criticism from the Jewish community when he told a Swedish magazine that the anti-immigrant, anti-Muslim party [Swedish Democrats] had "infiltrated" the city's Jewish community in order to turn it against Muslims. Reepalu later said he had no basis for his remarks and that he "shouldn't have put it that way". Jewish community officials subsequently sent a letter to the Social Democratic leader Stefan Löfven condemning what Reepalu had said. The letter stated that "Regardless of what he says and does from now on, we don't trust him." Lofven and Social Democratic secretary Carin Jämtin subsequently agreed to meet with Jewish community leaders to discuss the comments and actions of Reepalu, who was being criticized by members of his own party.

Reepalu responded to this controversy by stating in an interview with Haaretz that "I've never been an anti-Semite and never will be."

=== Antisemitic statements by members of Sweden Democrats since 2014 ===
In a 2014 interview with the newspaper Dagens Nyheter, Björn Söder at the time party secretary of the Sweden Democrats and Second Deputy Speaker of the Riksdag stated that, in his view, people with dual national identities would not necessarily identify as Swedish and immigrants should have to undergo Cultural assimilation. Söder stated that officially recognized minorities, including Jews, Sami, and Tornedalians in many cases had dual cultural identities and would probably be proud of both heritages. However, Söder's remarks were widely interpreted as meaning that Jews could not be Swedish unless they abandoned their Jewish identity. The comments caused other parliamentary parties to call for Söder's resignation. The Simon Wiesenthal Center listed the statement as number six on their list of the top ten most antisemitic events of 2014. In an interview with The Jerusalem Post, Söder denied the charges of antisemitism and claimed Dagens Nyheter had taken his statements out of context.

In October 2016, a video of the parliamentarian and economic policy spokesperson Oscar Sjöstedt making antisemitic jokes was released. Whilst at a party, believed to have taken place in 2011, he laughingly told a story about former co-workers with Nazi sympathies mocking Jews and comparing them to sheep. During the same month, the parliamentarian and second vice party leader Carina Herrstedt was confronted with having sent an allegedly racist, antisemitic, homophobic and anti-romaniyst email to her then spouse in 2011. The email, which had been leaked from the party's internal servers, for instance contained phrases that named black football players from the team Landskrona BoIS as niggers whilst also picturing Romani people as thieves.

In December 2016, the parliamentarian Anna Hagwall was expelled from the party after using arguments associated with antisemitism to promote a bill that she introduced in parliament intended to reduce concentration of media ownership in Sweden.

In September 2017, it was brought to light that 14 active or former municipal representatives of the party had supported the Nordic Resistance Movement, a Neo-Nazi organization, financially through memberships or purchases of antisemitic and racist literature or souvenirs.

== See also ==
- History of the Jews in Sweden
- Racism in Sweden
- Neo-Nazism
- Antisemitism in Islam § Sweden
- Antisemitism in the Arab world
- New antisemitism
- Religious intolerance
- Antisemitism in Europe
