= National Youth =

Sign of National Youth

National Youth (Swedish: Nationell ungdom) was a Swedish neofascist and openly racist organisation. National Youth was closely linked with the Swedish Resistance Movement. SÄPO classified it as a white power organisation and Expo classified it as a Nazi organisation.

The group became famous in the summer of 1998 for tearing down photographs of nude boys at the Swedish Historical Museum. The reason behind the action was to protest against pedophilia and "degenerate art". The exhibition was closed down after the event.

Since December 2000 they participated in the annual Salem March for Daniel Wretström, who was killed in the Stockholm suburb of Salem by a group of which some were young immigrants.

Together with the Swedish Resistance Movement they published the magazine Nationellt Motstånd. Earlier they published the magazine Folktribunen, which among other things has praised the people behind the racist killings in Kode and Klippan (in Sweden) as true patriots. The editor, Klas Lund, was convicted of bank robbery and of the murder of Ronny Landin in the summer of 1986. In the beginning of the 1990s Klas Lund was one of the leaders of VAM.

In May 2006, the Swedish Resistance Movement announced the youth organization and all its activities and members as merged with the main organization.
