= Timeline of Finnish history =

This is a timeline of Finnish history. To read about the background of these events, see History of Finland.

== BC ==
| Year | Date | Event |
|---|---|---|
| 9000 BC | | End of the last ice age in Finland. |
| 8900 BC | | Finland was inhabited by modern humans. |
| 5300 BC | | First pottery in Finland. |
| 3500 BC | | Giant's Church was constructed. |
| 2000 BC | | Beginning of the Kiukainen culture. |
| 1500 BC | | Beginning of the Bronze Age. |
| 500 BC | | Beginning of the Iron Age. |

== 1st millennium ==
| Year | Date | Event |
|---|---|---|
| 1 | | Beginning of the Roman period. |
| 400 | | Beginning of the Migration period. |
| 575 | | Beginning of the Merovingian period. |
| 800 | | End of the Merovingian period. |

== 13th century ==
| Year | Date | Event |
|---|---|---|
| 1239 or 1256 | | The Second Swedish Crusade took place. |
| 1278 | | Karelia was controlled by Novgorod. |
| 1293 | | The Third Swedish Crusade took place. |

== 14th century ==
| Year | Date | Event |
|---|---|---|
| 1323 | 12 August | The Treaty of Nöteborg was signed. |
| 1348 | | Magnus IV of Sweden led a crusade against the Orthodox, but they failed. |
| 1397 | | The Kalmar Union was established. |

== 15th century ==
| Year | Date | Event |
|---|---|---|
| 1403 | | Eric of Pomerania arrived in Finland. |
| 1407 | | Eric of Pomerania arrived in Finland again. |
| 1495 | | Russo-Swedish War (1495–97): The war began. |
| 1497 | | Russo-Swedish War (1495–97): The war ended. |

== 16th century ==
| Year | Date | Event |
|---|---|---|
| 1521 | | The Kalmar Union was disestablished. |
| 1550 | | Founding of Helsinki. |

== 17th century ==
| Year | Date | Event |
|---|---|---|
| 1610 | | Ingrian War: The war began. |
| 1611 | | Gustavus Adolphus became king of Sweden. |
| 1617 | | Ingrian War: The war ended. |
| 1655 | | Second Northern War: The war began. |
| 1660 | | Second Northern War: The war ended. |
| 1661 | | The Treaty of Cardis was signed with the Russian Empire. |
| 1695 | | The Great Famine of 1695–1697 began. |
| 1697 | | The Great Famine of 1695–1697 ended with one-third of the population dead. |
| 1700 | | Great Northern War: The war began. |

== 18th century ==
| Year | Date | Event |
|---|---|---|
| 1703 | | Saint Petersburg was founded. |
| 1710 | 27 February | The Battle of Helsingborg began. |
| 1710 | 28 February | The Battle of Helsingborg ended with Swedish victory. |
| 1718 | | Charles XII was killed. |
| 1721 | 30 August | The Treaty of Nystad was signed. |
| 1721 | 21 September | The Great Northern War ended with Russian victory. |
| 1721 | | Population: 250,000. |
| 1749 | | Population: 427,000. |
| 1771 | | Gustav III started a coup d'état. |
| 1788 | June | Gustav III started a war against Russia. |
| 1790 | August | Russo-Swedish War (1788–1790): The war ended. |

== 19th century ==
| Year | Date | Event |
|---|---|---|
| 1808 | 21 February | Finnish War: The war began. |
| 1809 | 29 March | Diet of Finland was formed. |
| 1809 | 17 September | Finnish War: The war ended. |
| 1818 | | The House of Bernadotte was established. |
| 1869 | | The Ecclesiastical Law of 1869 was passed. |
| 1889 | | The Dissenter Law of 1889 was passed. |
| 1892 | | Finnish became an official language of Finland. |
| 1899 | | The Russification of Finland took place. |

== 20th century ==
| Year | Date | Event |
|---|---|---|
| 1919 | 26 July | Kaarlo Juho Ståhlberg became the 1st president of Finland. |
| 1920 | 14 October | Treaty of Tartu was signed to improve relations with the Soviet Union. |
| 1920 | 31 December | The Treaty of Tartu became effective. |
| 1925 | 2 March | Lauri Kristian Relander became president of Finland. |
| 1931 | 2 March | Pehr Evind Svinhufvud became president of Finland. |
| 1932 | | Mäntsälä rebellion took place. |
| 1937 | 1 March | Kyösti Kallio became president of Finland. |
| 1939 | 30 November | Winter War: The war began. |
| 1940 | 13 March | Winter War: The war ended. |
| 1940 | 19 December | Risto Ryti became president of Finland. |
| 1941 | 25 June | Continuation War: The war began against Soviet Union. |
| 1941 | 10 July | Finnish conquest of East Karelia (1941): The conquest began. |
| 1941 | September | Finland conquered East Karelia. |
| 1941 | 6 December | Finnish conquest of East Karelia (1941): The conquest ended. |
| 1944 | 4 August | Carl Gustaf Emil Mannerheim became president of Finland. |
| 1944 | 15 September | Lapland War: The war began against Nazi Germany. |
| 1944 | 19 September | Continuation War: The war ended with Soviet victory. |
| 1945 | 27 April | Lapland War: The last of the German troops left the country and thus, ending the war in Finland. |
| 1946 | 11 March | Juho Kusti Paasikivi became president of Finland. |
| 1947 | 10 February | The Paris Peace Treaties were signed and restored borders from 1 January 1941. |
| 1952 | | Finland entered into a passport union. |
| 1956 | 1 March | Urho Kekkonen became president of Finland. |
| 1961 | | Finland requested membership for the European Free Trade Association. |
| 1975 | | Finland signed the Helsinki Accords. |
| 1982 | 27 January | Mauno Koivisto became president of Finland. |
| 1982 | | Keke Rosberg wins the 1982 Formula One Championship, marking him the first Finnish Formula One driver to win a Championship. |
| 1986 | | Finland became a member of the European Free Trade Association. |
| 1991 | | A depression took place after an overheating of the economy. |
| 1994 | 1 March | Martti Ahtisaari became president of Finland. |
| 1995 | | Finland joined the European Union. |
| 1998 | 1 November | Mika Häkkinen wins the Championship against Michael Schumacher, in Japan. |
| 1999 | | Finland joined the Eurozone. |
| 2000 | 1 March | Tarja Halonen became president of Finland. |

== 21st century ==
| Year | Date | Event |
|---|---|---|
| 2006 | 15 January | A presidential election took place. |
| 2007 | 21 October | Kimi Raikkonen wins the Championship against both Fernando Alonso and Lewis Hamilton, in Brazil. |
| 2009 | 31 December | The Sello mall shooting occurred. |
| 2010 | 12 February | In the 2010 Winter Olympics, 95 athletes competed. |
| 2011 | 17 April | The Finnish parliamentary election was held. |
| 2011 | 16 October | The Ålandic legislative election was held. |
| 2011 | 26 December | Cyclone Dagmar struck Finland, making it the worst storm that struck Finland after 10 years. |
| 2012 | 1 March | Sauli Niinistö became president of Finland. |
| 2012 | 26 May | The Hyvinkää shooting occurred. |
| 2013 | 30 January | The Jyväskylä library stabbing occurred. |
| 2013 | 15 November | The 2013 Nordic storms struck Finland. |
| 2014 | 9 June | Vladimir Putin said Finland could join NATO but Russia would have to react. |
| 2014 | 24 July | Two Finnish women were killed working in Herat, Afghanistan. |
| 2014 | 28 November | Same sex marriage was legalized. |
| 2018 | 28 January | A presidential election was held. |
| 2023 | 4 April | Finland joins NATO. |

== See also ==
- Finland
- History of Finland
- History of Sweden
- History of Russia
- Soviet Union
- Timeline of Helsinki
- Timeline of Swedish history
- Timeline of Russian history
- List of presidents of Finland
