= 2016 Helsinki Asema-aukio assault =

Crime in Helsinki, Finland

The 2016 Helsinki Asema-aukio assault happened on 10 September 2016, when Jesse Tornianen, a member of the Finnish Resistance Movement, a Neo-Nazi organisation, attacked a passer-by who had argued with the demonstrators and spit on them with a jumping kick. Because of the kick, the 28-year-old Jimi Joonas Karttunen fell down, hit his head to the street and suffered a cerebral haemorrhage. Karttunen was rushed to the Töölö Hospital, which he later left despite the hospital staff's recommendation to stay at the hospital. He died about a week after the assault on 16 September 2016 at the Meilahti Hospital. The perpetrator had a criminal background.

On 30 December 2016, the district court gave Torniainen a sentence of two years in prison without parole for severe assault. The court did not see that there would be a connection between Karttunen's death and the jumping kick, so the charge of severe manslaughter was dismissed. The prosecutor appealed this to the court of appeals, who raised Tornianen's sentence to two years and three months in prison. The court based this on Torniainen's racist motive.

== Background ==
Jimi Karttunen's parents described him as a humane, international and sensitive poetic boy, who accepted people from all countries to Finland. According to Karttunen's father he had previously worked at a daycare centre.

The perpetrator of the assault is Jesse Eppu Oskari Tornianen (born 1990), a member of the Finnish Resistance Movement. He is one of the founders of the movement. He had also previously committed assaults, of which seven cases were normal and one was severe. Tornianen got his latest sentence in November 2017, after assaulting a security guard at a HIFK football match in summer 2015. Torniainen had also been sentenced to fines and many prison sentences with parole.

Torniainen got one of his sentences in 2009 when he and his friends had assaulted a foreign man and said he was a Nazi soldier. Torniainen has also participated in many hooligan fights in connection to football matches. He has also served as a speaker in the Pohjoinen Perinne organisation connected to the Finnish Resistance Movement. The organisation is currently publishing the Magneettimedia service.

== Course of the events ==
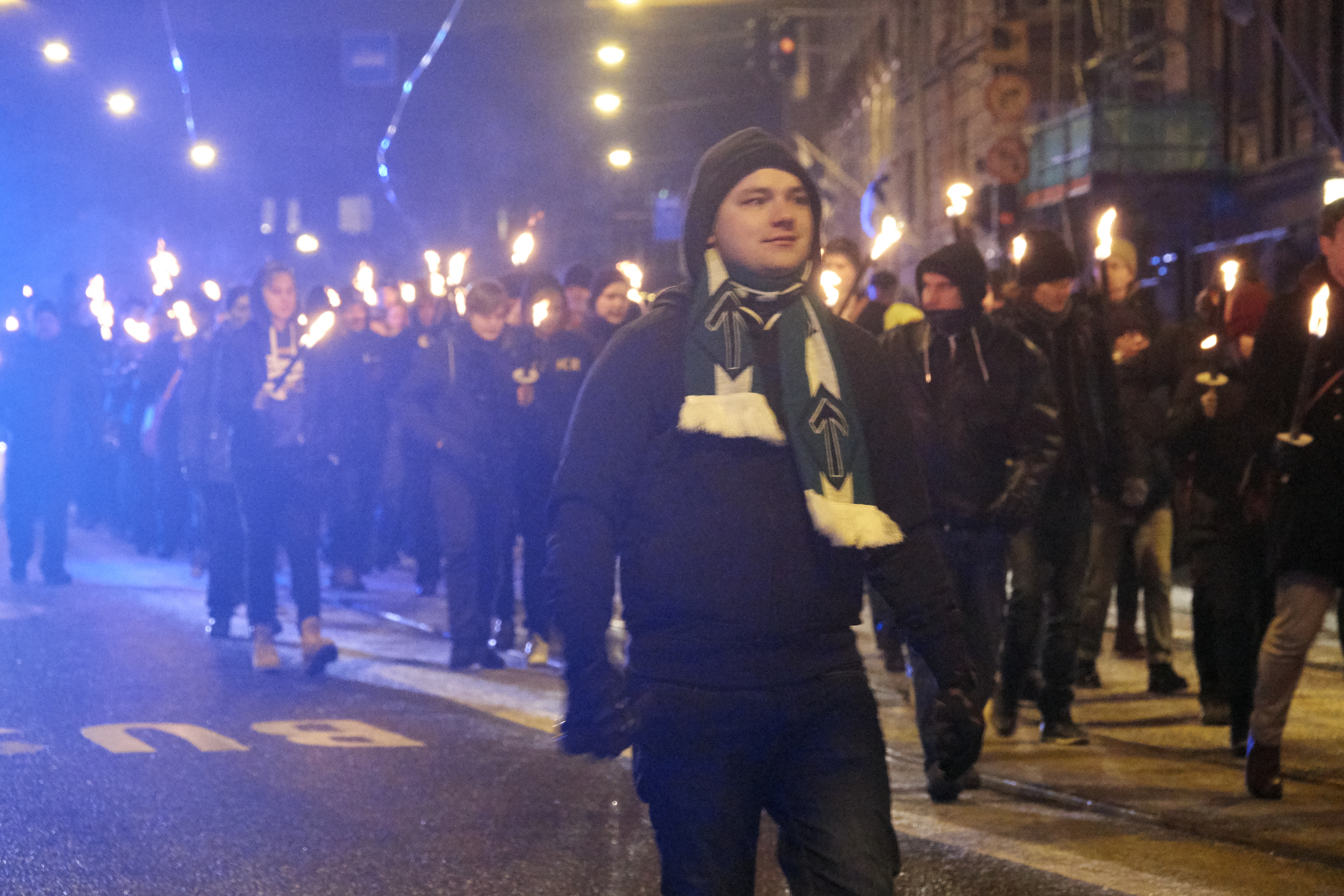
The perpetrator Jesse Torniainen at the far-right "612" parade in 2017.

=== Demonstration and assault ===
The Finnish Resistance Movement held a demonstration in Helsinki, Finland on the Asema-aukio square in front of the restaurant Vltava on Saturday 10 September 2016. A member of the movement had told the police about the event in advance saying they would be handing out pamphlets, but had not mentioned the Finnish Resistance Movement. Because of this, the police were not present to watch over the event. A video shot at the event shows a police car handling another case at the vicinity of the station and leaving at about 12:45. At the time of the assault there were no police patrols in the area.

The assault is shown on a recording of the security camera. A group of people were standing at the demonstration on the edge of the walking path in a row holding flags of the movement and handing out pamphlets describing the notion of the movement. The victim of the assault, 28-year-old Jimi Karttunen, had been walking with his friends from the Helsinki main post office to the Helsinki Central railway station. When passing the people holding flags Karttunen had stopped, spit in front of them and said a negative opinion about the Finnish Resistance Movement. After this, Jesse Torniainen, who had been standing on the other edge of the row in the direction of the station, sprinted towards Karttunen and kicked him hard on the chest. Karttunen fell down and hit his head. Torniainen remained at the scene for a while, but when people helped the victim stand up, he left. According to the security video other demonstrators had also gathered for a while to inspect the victim's wounds, after which they picked up their things related to the demonstration and left.

The police arrived at the scene at 13:03, talked to a passer-by at the scene and left to search for the suspect. The police were told that an ambulance had been called. The victim's friends helped him to the station, where the ambulance picked him up at 13:13. The victim was first taken to the Meilahti Hospital and from there to the intensive care unit at the Töölö Hospital because of brain damage in cerebral haemorrhage.

After the event, the Finnish Resistance Movement published a video about the event, showing a man lying down on the ground next to a blood stain. The website of the movement praised the assault. According to the movement, the case was about discipline and defending the honour of the movement.

=== Refusal of hospital care ===
In hospital, Karttunen took medicines classified as narcotics. He also left the department on many care days.

Karttunen was sent home from hospital by his own will on Thursday next week against the hospital's recommendation. On Friday he began to feel ill at his home and managed to dial the emergency telephone number before losing consciousness. On the next day Karttunen was found unconscious in his apartment with many empty cans of Ritravil around him. He was treated at the Meilahti Hospital for narcotic poisoning and was given many antidotes against narcotics. The hospital diagnosed him for cerebral haemorrhage and swelling of the brain. Karttunen died in hospital that evening.

=== Pretrial investigation ===
The police investigated the case as assault and severe manslaughter, and apprehended a man born in 1990. According to the police, the suspect was a man who had notified them about the demonstration, one of the founders of the Finnish Resistance Movement. On 21 September 2016 the Helsinki district court imprisoned the suspect who had remained silent about his acts during interrogation. He was released from imprisonment under pretrial investigation on 19 October and placed under travel ban.

According to the prosecutor and the statement about the cause of death, Karttunen died from brain damage from his wounds and from the resulting cerebral haemorrhage and swelling of brain tissue. The pretrial investigation material was given to the prosecutor for consideration of charges on week 48. The pretrial investigation was completed on 2 December and cited severe assault and severe manslaughter as the charges. Other members of the Finnish Resistance Movement present at the trial said they had not seen the kick.

Jesse Torniainen, a member of the Finnish Resistance Movement suspected of the assault turned himself in to the police.

== Trials and sentence ==
The Helsinki district court imprisoned Torniainen at an imprisonment trial held on 21 September 2016 and he was released from investigation imprisonment on 19 October. During the police interrogation he denied all charges presented towards him. On 21 December 2016 he was read the charges against him and the trial proper started at the Helsinki district court.

At the district court, the prosecutor demanded a sentence of 5.5 to 6 years of imprisonment for Torniainen for severe assault and severe manslaughter. He demanded that the sentence be lengthened because of Torniainen's previous criminal background and the racist motive. According to the defense, a suitable sentence would have been 1.5 years of prison with parole, based on the great amount of publicity caused by the event. According to the defense, the victim's death was influenced by him leaving the hospital to early. The defense also claimed that the victim had caused his own death himself with the use of intoxicants and narcotics. According to the prosecutor the medical statements proved that the victim's use of intoxicants and narcotics had no connection to his death. The suspect Jesse Torniainen told the district court that his motive had been that the victim had threatened members of the Finnish Resistance Movement with violence. According to the prosecutor the motive had been a disagreement about the values of the Finnish Resistance Movement between the victim and the perpetrator.

=== Sentence ===
The district court gave its sentence on 30 December 2016. Torniainen was sentenced to two years in prison for severe assault. In giving its sentence, the district court accepted the prosecutor's demand of lengthening the sentence as Torniainen had previously been sentenced for five crimes. Each of these crimes had been at least partly because of violence. The court dismissed the charge of severe manslaughter and the demand of lengthening the sentence because of a racist motive.

According to the court the assault had been severe because of it had come as a surprise to the victim, it had been directed against a previously unknown person on the street and the victim had had no chance to defend himself. Torniainen's jump kick had caused Karttunen to fall down and caused him to fracture his skull, damage his brain and receive a cerebral haemorrhage. The court also stated the assault had been severe because it had been done during a previously announced public event as a part of "the activity of a national socialist organisation and the defense of this activity". The reason for lengthening Torniainen's prison sentence was his earlier sentences of violent crimes.

The court refused the prosecutor's demand of charges for severe manslaughter because there had been no connection between the jump kick and the victim's death. According to the court it had been possible that the victim's own activity, such as leaving the hospital against the staff's recommendation, could have significantly affected the worsening of his cerebral haemorrhage. The court stated that according to the medical statement, the victim had not committed himself ot proper care, but "he had stopped hospital care on his own initiative against the staff's recommendation, left the hospital and immediately after the treatment and possibly also during it used intoxicants and medicines he had not been prescribed by the physicians". The neurological surgeon who had treated the victim told the court that the use of intoxicants subjects the person to new wounds on the head and a new head wound can be fatal for a person recovering from a brain damage wound. The surgeon also said that the victim had had a good prediction of recovering from his brain damage wound and he had suffered no neurological symptoms during his treatment. The surgeon also said he felt it was extremely rare that a cerebral haemorrhage would still worsen in the brain three days after receiving the head wound. The prosecutor immediately said he intended to take the matter to the court of appeals because of the connection between the jump kick and the victim's death and probably also because of the racist motive.

The prosecutor took the matter to the court of appeals, which raised Torniainen's prison sentence to two years and three months on 26 January 2018. The court based this on the perpetrator's racist motive as the victim had stated he opposed the values represented by the racist organisation. The court could not dismiss the notion that the victim's use of medicine and narcotics against his treatment could have influenced his recovery from his brain damage. The charge for manslaughter was dismissed as the severe assault could not be shown to have a connection to the victim's death. Torniainen requested permission to appeal the matter to the Supreme Court of Finland. The request was denied so the sentence given by the court of appeals remained in force.

== Reactions ==
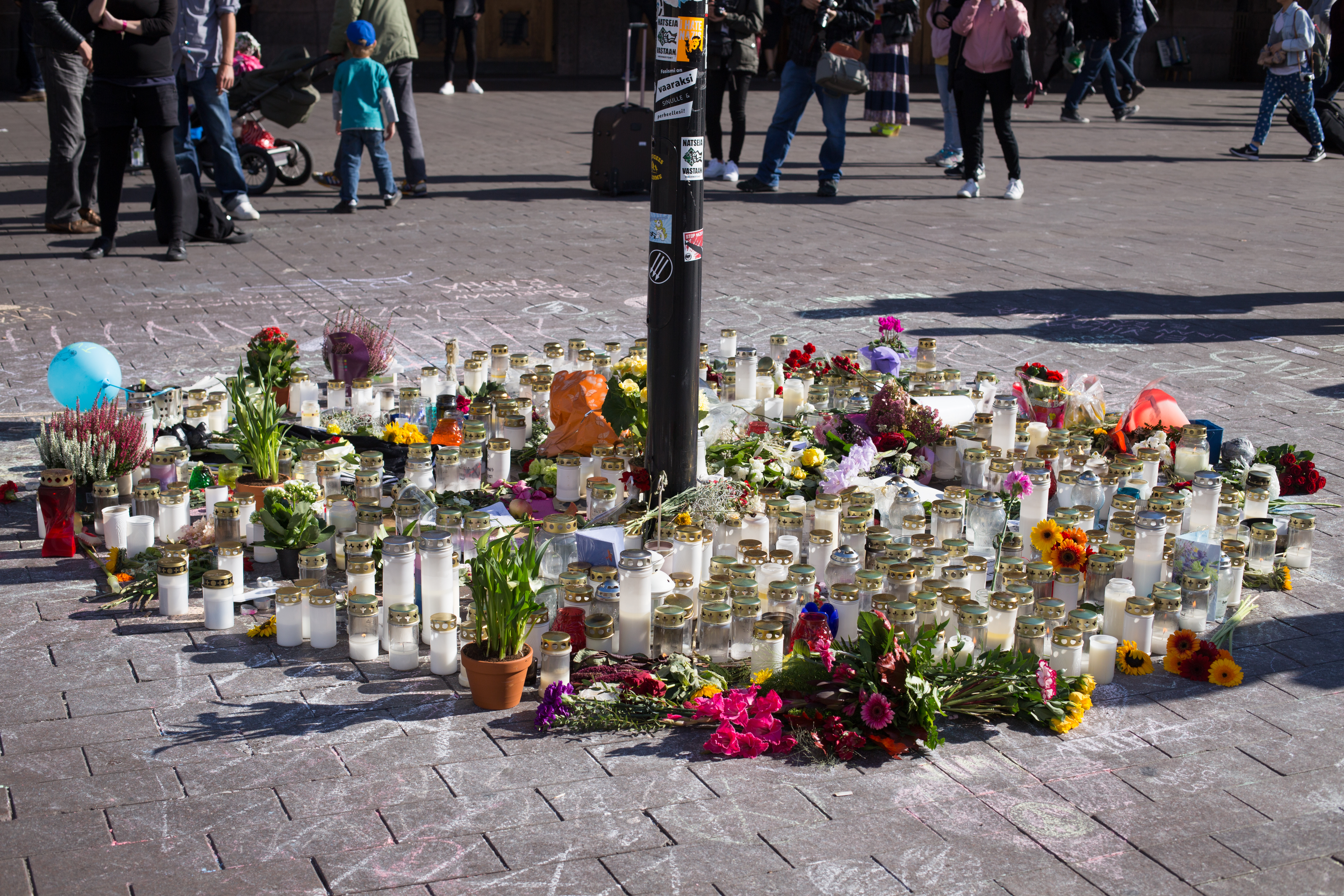
Flowers and candles in memory of the victim in front of the Helsinki Central railway station.

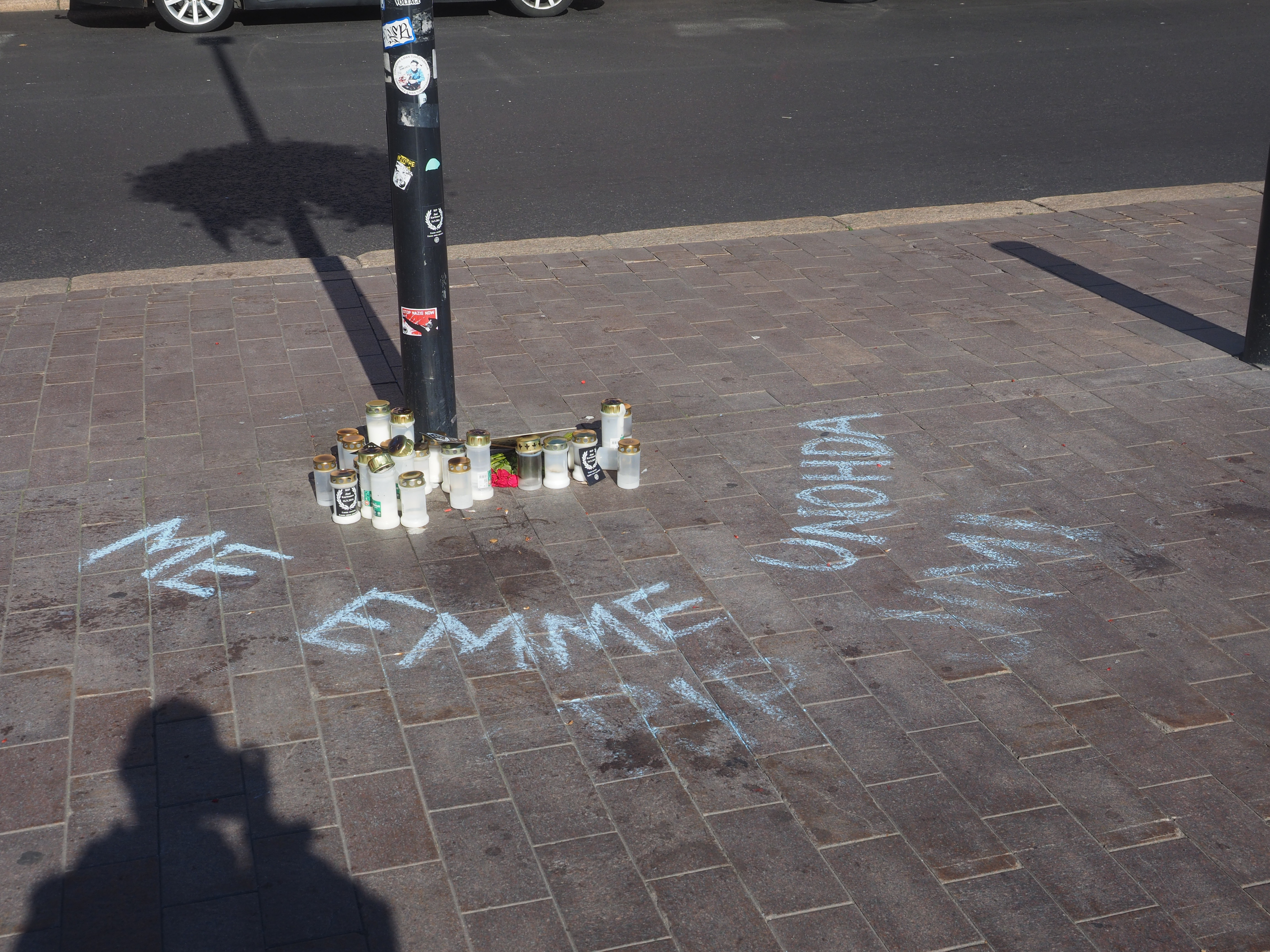
A memorial in memory of the victim at the Asema-aukio square in September 2024.

Flowers and candles were brought at the front doors of the Helsinki Central railway station on the evening of Saturday 17 September 2016 and people also stopped at the scene. The actual memorial place is not in front of the main doors, but instead near the entrance on the Asema-aukio square where the assault happened. There were memorials for the victim also in other cities such as Tampere and Jyväskylä.

The event was also reported by the press in Sweden. There were memorials for the victim in Stockholm and Gothenburg on 25 September. The Antifascistisk Aktion movement in Stockholm also held a memorial for Karttunen.

=== Reactions by politicians ===
The government also reacted to the event. President of Finland Sauli Niinistö said at a press conference held at a refugee meeting in New York City that the violence that had occurred at the Helsinki Asema-aukio square cannot be accepted. According to Niinistö membership in an organisation that has criminal principles or purposes is also illegal. Prime Minister of Finland Juha Sipilä said it was important to investigate the legality of organisations aimed at violent action. Timo Soini, chairman of the Finns Party, condemned violence in his blog post. The Minister of Treasury Petteri Orpo said that violent organisations should be outlawed. The Minister of Internal Affairs Paula Risikko said that the legality of far-right organisations should be reinvestigated.

=== Demonstrations ===
A demonstration against political violence was held in Helsinki on 24 September with former President of Finland Tarja Halonen speaking at the demonstration. The demonstration was attended by about 15 thousand people. Outside Finland, the demonstration was covered at least by Dagens Nyheter, Bloomberg L.P. and The Guardian. Demonstrations outside Helsinki in Finland were held in Tampere, Jyväskylä, Kuopio, Oulu and Joensuu. Each of these demonstrations was attended by about 50 to 500 people. Prime Minister of Finland Juha Sipilä attended the demonstration in Kuopio.

=== Political consequences ===
Because of Karttunen's death, the event centre for the state council in Finland now also informs the prime minister about matters related to the citizens' safety around the clock. A discussion about far-right movements and violence in Finland was held at the Parliament of Finland on 5 October 2016. The initiative to hold this discussion was signed by each party at the parliament.

In October 2016 the Prosecutor General of Finland said it would not seek outlawing the Nordic Resistance Movement, but the Police Board made a demand to outlaw the movement on 2 March 2017. On 30 November 2017 the district court of Pirkanmaa declared the Nordic Resistance Movement as discontinued because of illegal and blatantly tasteless activity. The court of appeals in Turku upheld this decision in September 2018. This decision did not come into force until the matter had been discussed at the Supreme Court of Finland. The supreme court ordered the activity of the movement to be temporarily forbidden and ceased until a final solution had been found for the matter. The Nordic Resistance Movement was permanently outlawed on 22 September 2020.

== See also ==
- Jyväskylä library stabbing
