= Kankaanpää terrorism arrests =

Terrorist incident in Finland

The Kankaanpää terrorism arrests were a string of arrests in Kankaanpää, Finland, against a group of young men who have been investigated for the preparation of a terrorist attack. The men planned blowing up the local refugee center and were equipped with guns and bombs for this purpose.

This is Finland's first case of suspicion of terrorist offenses related to far-right politics in Finland.

Police had been investigating the case since 2019, and at the end of 2021, five Finnish men were imprisoned in the Kankaanpää region and Tampere. Two 25-year-olds, two 26-year-olds and one 23-year-old man are the suspects. Two of them have the same last name. Some of them have attended schools in the Kankaanpää region.

== Ideology ==
According to police, the radical right wing group represented ideology called accelerationism. According to the ideology, the society is the enemy, and its collapse has to be accelerated through terrorism and violence. The men belonged to Atomwaffen Division Finland.

European Police Office Europol participated in the study of the Kankaanpää group by providing expert assistance. According to Europol, in addition to the accelerationism, the Kankaanpää group was motivated by "apocalyptic Satanism". The police found a connection from the tattoos of the leader of the group and the runes found in his apartment to a book known among the far-right about radical satanism called "21 Paths to the Kingdom of Darkness" according to reporters of Yle. The book tells about a sect known as the Order of Nine Angles that aims to destroy Western democracy and values by creating a new one through chaos and destruction.

== Preparation ==
In a home search conducted in December 2019, police seized, among other things, a dozen unauthorized firearms from the group. Among the weapons were handguns and shotguns. One of the weapons was a semi-automatic rifle, which had been modified into a fully automatic one. In addition, more than 3,000 cartridges were seized. Forty kilos of dynamite were also seized; nearly 5 kilos of gunpowder, apparently belonging to the Defense Forces, which police said was to be manufactured into pipe bombs; as well as a large number of fuses and different types of explosive primers. In addition, police seized fertilizer, which contains ammonium nitrate. Ammonium nitrate and fuel oil can be made into explosive named ANFO. Of the materials found by the police, it is possible to build a bomb similar to the one used by Anders Behring Breivik's attack in Oslo in 2011. The fertilizer had also been made into a ready explosive. There were more than 100 liters of fertilizer. In addition, the group held a wide range of military equipment, including gas masks, helmets, field suits and combat vests.

== Plan ==
Police suspect that five men in the group had learned the use of weapons and explosives to carry out an explosive attack on Niinisalo refugee center. That refugee center had ceased operations before the group was exposed, but the group continued to plan the terrorist attack nonetheless.

When an empty refugee center burned on the ground on December 1, 2015, the team leader released a video filmed of the fire before the fire department arrived. The man was the main suspect in arson, but police failed to gather sufficient evidence to prosecute.

== Police investigation ==
During 2021, the members of the group were subjected to large-scale electronic surveillance by the police. Wiretapping and by observing in secret, the police found out that the leader of the Kankaanpää group had close links with the main far-right leaders of Finland, among others neo-Nazi organization Nordic Resistance Movement as well as the local chapters of the American groups Hammerskins and Atomwaffen Division and they are suspected of having had a significant impact on the operations of the Kankaanpää group.

For years, members of the Kankaanpää neo-Nazi group had committed various acts of street violence in Kankaanpää. The group had an internal code that was enforced with violence.

== Arrest ==
Five men were arrested at the end of 2021 for preparing for a terrorist offense and for an intentional explosive offense committed for terrorist purposes.

The District Court released four suspects in custody in January 2022 and one in the past.

Criminal codes in the preliminary investigation include a serious firearms offense committed for terrorist purposes, intentional committed for terrorist purposes explosive offense, training for the commission of a terrorist offense and aggravated theft for terrorist purposes. A offender is considered to have a terrorist purpose if his purpose is to cause serious fear among the population, or alternatively to force the authority to either do something, not do something or tolerate something.

== Convictions ==
The 28-year-old man was sentenced to one year and four months in prison for aggravated and basic assault, illegal possession of explosives, firearms offence and concealment offence. The 29-year-old man was sentenced to one year and four months in prison for aggravated and basic assault, illegal possession of explosives, firearms offence, concealment offence and aggravated extortion. The man born in 1998 was convicted of aggravated assault, firearms offences and concealment offences in a one-year suspended prison sentence. The man born in 1996 was sentenced to one year in prison for aggravated assault. The man born in 2000 was sentenced to eight months in prison for assault.
