= Haakon Forwald =

Norwegian neo-Nazi and musician

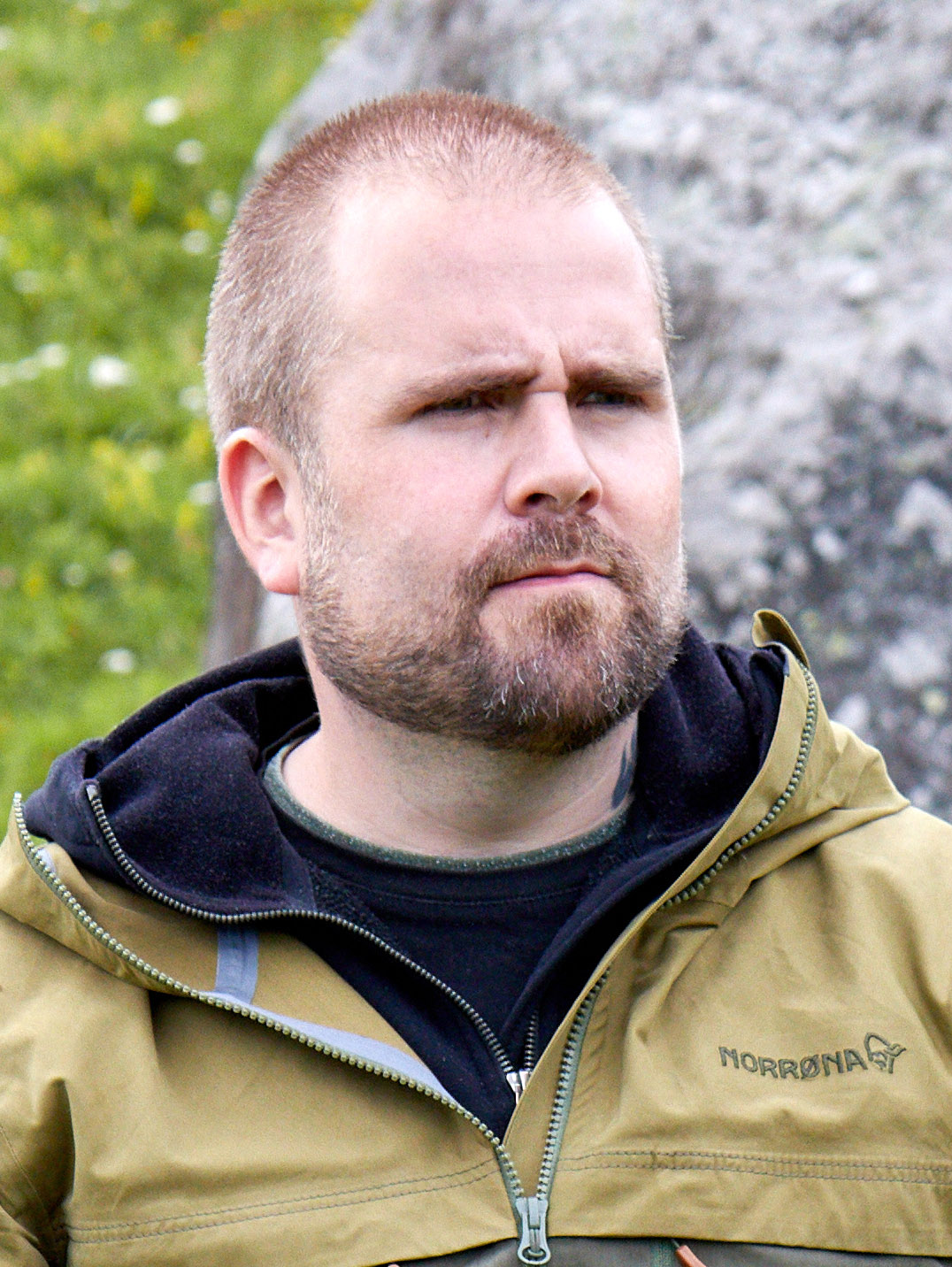
- Forwald in 2019
- Born: Haakon Forwald; September 14, 1978 (age 47); Røyken, Buskerud, Norway
- Occupation: Nordic Strength Council Member
- Known for: Leading member of Ultranationalist group Nordic Strength. Former Leader of the Nordic Resistance Movement in Norway

Haakon Nikolas Forwald (born 14 September 1978 in Røyken) is a Norwegian musician and leading member of the Neo-Nazi Nordic activist organisation Nordic Strength (Norwegian: Nordisk Styrke), founded in 2019. He was from 2010 to 2019 the leader of the Norwegian branch of the Nordic Resistance Movement (NRM), a neo-Nazi movement in Scandinavia. He has been described by the newspaper Verdens Gang as one of the most dangerous people in Northern Europe.

Forwald is the founder of the band Disiplin and was previously a member of the bands Myrkskog and Dissection. He used the stage names Weltenfeind, Savant M, General K, Drakul Azacain, and Eihwaz WeltenFeind.

== Biography ==
Forwald played in Desolation, Archon, and Maleficum. He joined Myrkskog in 1998 and left the band in 2000 to form Disiplin. In 2005 he kicked out the other Disiplin members for not being members of the Misanthropic Luciferian Order, a Satanic order.

After Brice Leqlercq left Dissection, Forwald became the band's bassist in 2005 and left the same year "As a result of bassist Haakon Forwald's family situation back home in Norway and his initiatory work with the Norwegian cell division of the Misanthropic Luciferian Order" and "in order to focus on his esoteric and exoteric work in Norway".

In around 2005–2006, Forwald turned towards pagan and far-right ideology which he integrated into his band Disiplin, which also joined the NSBM network Pagan Front.
