= Nordic Strength =

Nordic neo-Nazi organisation

- Nordisk Styrka
- Founding leader: Klas Lund
- Leader: Haakon Forwald
- Split from: Nordic Resistance Movement
- Ideology: Neo-Nazism; Scandinavism
- Political position: Far-right
- Website: nordiskstyrke.org

Nordic Strength (or "Nordic Force", Swedish: Nordisk Styrka) (Note: Swedish: Nordisk Styrka; Norwegian: Nordisk Styrke; Danish: Nordisk Styrke; Icelandic: Norrænn Styrkur; Faroese: Norðurlendsk Styrki; Finnish: Pohjoismainen Vahvuus; Greenlandic: Nunat Avannarliit Nukittussusaat) is a Nordic neo-Nazi organisation, founded in August 2019 by leading members of the Nordic Resistance Movement, including its leader Klas Lund. Members of Nordic Strength have been convicted of over 100 violent crimes and weapons offences. In April 2021, Nordic Strength opened a gym for training in combat skills and tactics.
