= Legion Wasa =

Former neo-Nazi terrorist organization in Sweden

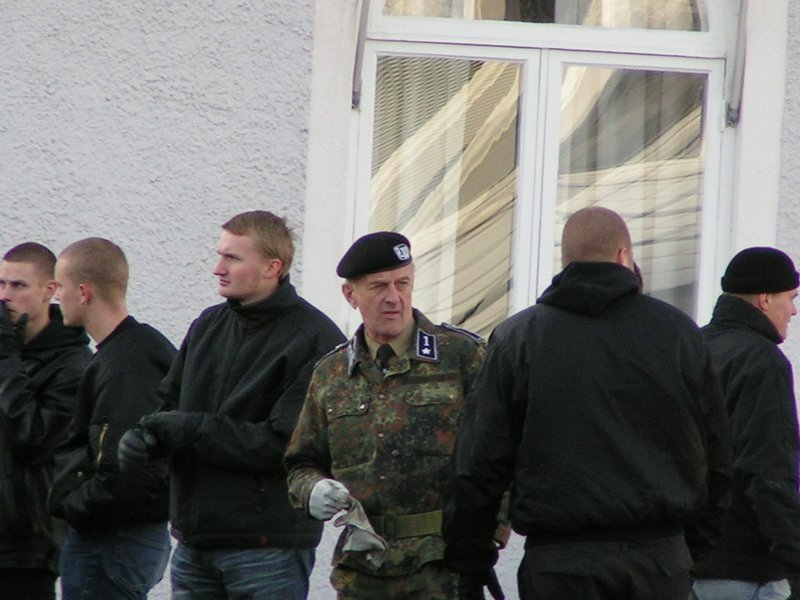
Nationalsocialistisk Front (NSF) holding a demonstration in Växjö, Sweden, with Legion Wasa leader Curt Linusson in camouflage.

Legion Wasa was a Swedish neo-Nazi paramilitary organisation founded in 1999.

The members of Legion Wasa have reportedly been preparing for race war, and once made preparations for helping out Saddam Hussein in the Iraq War against the invading United States Army. The offer was however turned down by the Iraqi embassy in Sweden. Led by Curt Linusson, a former UN soldier and Home Guard officer, the group has conducted field practice in the forests of Västra Götaland County. The organisation is said to have between 25 and 30 members.

In 2004 four members of the organisation were arrested, charged with plotting mass murders of political opponents, and of forming a terrorist cell inspired by the novel The Turner Diaries. All four were acquitted for terrorism charges, although three of the charged were convicted for violence and drug charges, with sentences ranging from one to two years imprisonment.

The organisation has been inactive since around 2010.

== See also ==
- National Socialist Front
