= Fredrik Vejdeland =

Swedish neo-Nazi politician (born 1978)

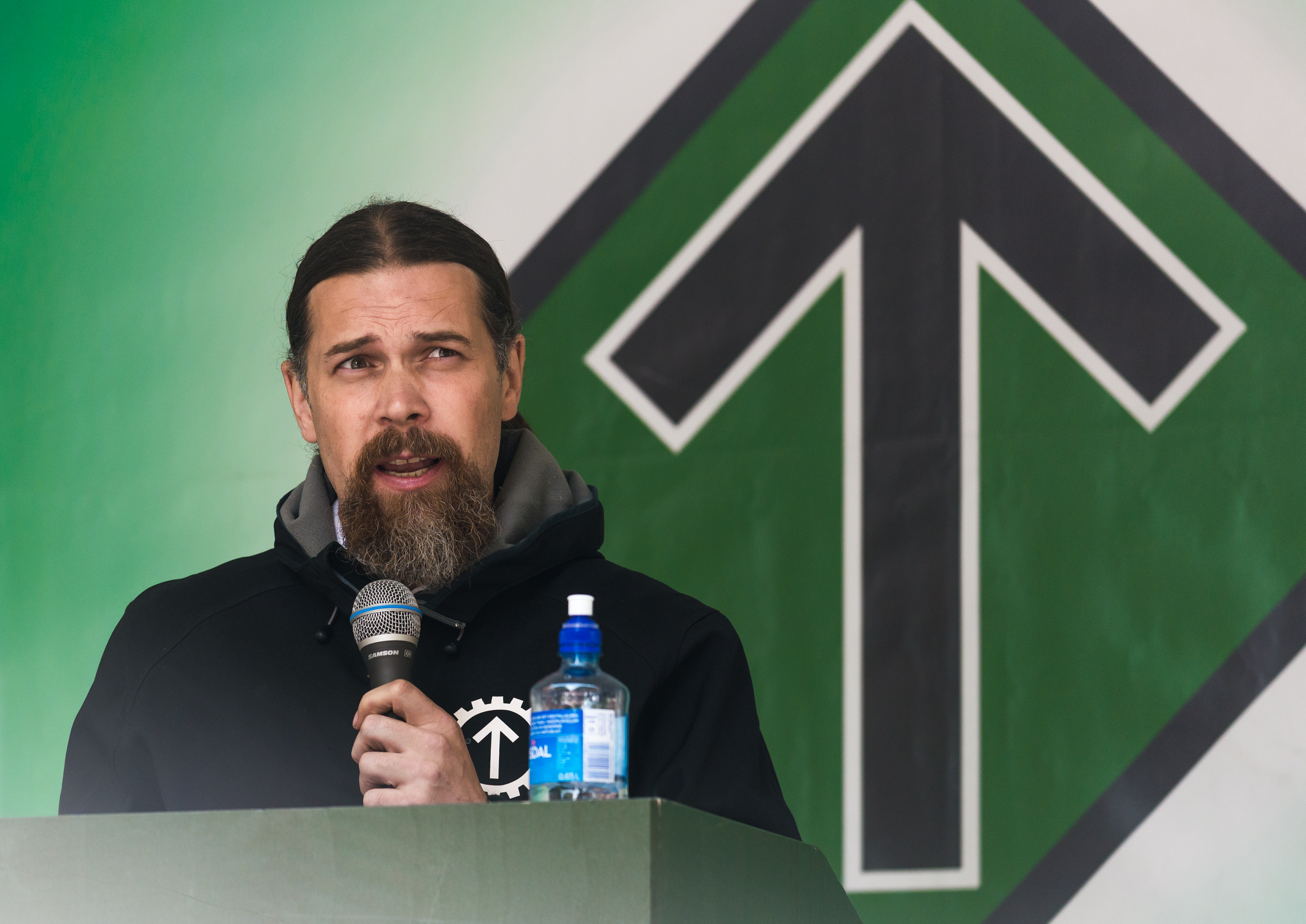
- Vejdeland in 2018
- Born: 3 October 1978 (age 47); Jämtland, Sweden
- Occupations: Construction worker; politician
- Years active: 2009–present
- Organization: Nordic Resistance Movement
- Known for: Leadership of the Nordic Resistance Movement
- Criminal status: Specially Designated Global Terrorist (By the US)
- Children: 8

Fredrik Vejdeland (born 3 October 1978) is a Swedish construction worker and neo-Nazi politician who, since February 2024, is the leader of the Nordic Resistance Movement (NRM) political party in Sweden. Since June 14, 2024, Vejdeland has been classified by the United States as a Specially Designated Global Terrorist, along with two other NRM leaders, and the NRM itself as a terrorist organization.

== Biography ==
=== Early life ===
Vejdeland was born on 3 October 1978 in Jämtland and was raised there. He states that he early on had a strong fascination for Old Norse mythology as well as Sweden's culture and history. Vejdeland describes his "national awakening" as a long process in which he was inspired, among other things, by the music group Ultima Thule. Their lyrics made him "identify with and feel pride in my people". He experienced a "racial instinct" and after a time felt "the significance of the race or Jewish question". He eventually defined himself as a National Socialist (i.e. Nazism) and in 2000 joined the then Swedish Resistance Movement.

=== Political career ===
In 2012, Vejdeland was a leader in the launch of the neo-Nazi web magazine Nordfront and was its editor-in-chief 2012–2017.

In February 2024, Vejdeland took over the role of leader of the Nordic Resistance Movement after Simon Lindberg, who had been leader since 2015.

Vejdeland has been convicted on several occasions of incitement against ethnic groups.

Vejdeland condemned the 2026 US and Israeli attack on Iran, characterizing it as an attempt to establish Zionist hegemony in the Middle East.

=== Participation in elections ===
Vejdeland ran in the 2018 municipal election in Kungälv Municipality where he got 55 personal votes. The party received 103 votes corresponding to 0.34% of the votes. In 2022, he ran in the municipal election in Munkedal Municipality where, however, he was not eligible. The party received 8 votes corresponding to 0.12% of the votes.

=== Family ===
Vejdeland has eight children.
