= Murder of John Hron =

1995 murder of Swedish boy by neo-Nazis

- Hron in his school photo (1995)
- Location: 57.92953°N 11.89108°E; Lake Ingetorp, Kungälv Municipality, Sweden
- Date: 17 August 1995 (CET)
- Target: John Hron
- Attack type: Child murder
- Deaths: 1
- Victims: 2
- Perpetrators: Daniel Hansson, Mikael Fjällholm, John Billing, and Martin B.
- Motive: Personal conflict
- Verdict: Guilty
- Convictions: Murder (Hansson and Fjällholm); Aggravated assault (Billing); Omission (Martin B.)
- Sentence: 8 years (Hansson); 5 years (Fjällholm); 10 months (Billing); 4 months (Martin B.)

John Hron (25 January 1981 – 17 August 1995) was a Swedish 14-year-old boy who was tortured to death and drowned by four older teenage neo-Nazis. The murder shocked the Swedish public, as deadly violence among youths were relatively uncommon at the time.

The case remains one of the most sensitive, debated and infamous crimes in Swedish criminal history.

== Murder ==
Hron had been camping with a friend by the small Lake Ingetorp near his hometown Kode in Kungälv Municipality on the night of his murder. Four young men (15-year-old Mikael Fjällholm and 18-year-old Daniel Hansson (1977–2018), plus a 17-year-old and another 18-year-old) appeared, who all had strong ties to the neo-Nazi skinhead subculture and especially the militant Nazi network Vitt Ariskt Motstånd ("White Aryan Resistance"). Hron had had some trouble with the youngest of the gang, Mikael Fjällholm, who was a known bully at the school both he and Hron attended. Mikael later said in his testimony, "I must have scared every last one in that school." Hron, who was known for speaking his mind, had come in conflict with Mikael and the neo-Nazi gang earlier, and at some point they had threatened to kill him. It was described by other pupils at the school that Fjällholm "demanded everyone bow in fear to him, but Hron refused".

On the evening of 17 August 1995, while Hron was camping with his friend Christian at a cliff at lake Ingetorp, the group of neo-Nazis had noticed them and walked up to their campsite, dressed in Nazi clothing and playing White Power music from a stereo. First, Daniel Hansson threw a can of beer in Hron's face and told him to say that he "loves Nazism", punching him several times in the face, while the others laughed. Hron, being known for standing up against racism, refused to say this and was again beaten brutally for it.

The four began kicking him in the head, hitting him, throwing heavy cans of beer in his face, and taunting him verbally. They would intersperse their beatings with suddenly acting friendly, offering him beers, and apologizing, just to continue beating him again, in what was described by the court as a sadistic "cat-and-mouse"-like torture that went on for hours. They jump-kicked him, kicked him in the back of his head, struck his neck with a flaming piece of wood and burnt him, stomped on his stomach, destroyed his belongings and set fire to the tent he had shared with Christian. Hron was reportedly visibly shaking at this point, either from fear, shock, pain or both.

Hron and Christian begged several times for the neo-Nazis to let them go home, but this simply angered the attackers who continued hitting and kicking Hron until he could no longer stand. Hron was eventually pushed into the lake, still alive, Daniel Hansson "joked" as he did this by saying "now he shall go for a swim" or "now he shall take a dive". Hron tried to swim away and two of the four attackers walked around to the other side of the lake to catch him if he were to swim across. Around this time the murderers also shouted to Hron to swim back, threatening to kill Christian if he did not, and Hron decided to swim back to save his friend's life. Christian was forced to shout to Hron "come back or they will kill me".

When Hron got back on land the torture continued as two of the most active attackers, Daniel and Mikael, got John up from the lake, and after knocking him down again they placed his body in a position that made it easier for them to continue stomping him in the head for several minutes with their boots. They later said about this part: "It felt so good that we couldn't stop". It was revealed in the investigation that they had kicked and stomped on Hron's face and head with steel-toe boots for seven whole minutes without pause. They kicked or stomped Hron in the head so hard that his brain had at least partially spilled out.

After Hron became unconscious, they rolled his fractured body into the water again. He sank to the bottom and drowned. In police interviews one of the killers stated they heard a "whistling" or "gurgling" sound from Hron right before they rolled him into the lake, although medics said that even if he had not been dumped in the lake he would not have survived the damage to his head and body.

Christian hitched a ride home and alerted the authorities. The two murderers, still at the scene of the crime, rolled a cigarette as they watched Hron's body sink to the bottom of the lake. They later jokingly bragged about it to the other two attackers.

== Aftermath, public outcry and prosecution ==
In the morning after the night of the murder, Hron's parents were awakened by Christian's family, authorities were alerted, and a big search began. Police divers went into the lake and it didn't take long until they found Hron's lifeless body at the bottom. It has been described by investigators on the scene that when it became known that a dead body had been found, a shout or cry of "agony beyond belief" could be heard over the entire lake area from one of Hron's parents. The policemen, divers and investigators has later described the scene that early morning around the lake as so macabre, tragic and grusome that everyone there was affected.

In court, the 18-year-old boy who was the main person behind the abuse, Daniel Hansson, was sentenced to eight years in prison for murder. He was released on parole on 1 January 2001. Mikael Fjällholm, the 15-year-old, was the first to be picked up by police and he was sentenced to prison (which in Sweden is a rare thing to happen to a convicted teenager). The two others, John Billing and one more known only as BM were sentenced to ten and four months in prison for assault and not alerting authorities to the ongoing assault and murder, respectively.

At one point in the court, Hron's father cried out and shouted directly to the perpetrators: "Look here, see what you have done, he was my son!"

The case received nationwide attention within Sweden. The public was shocked by the news of such violence and a wave of huge anti-racist demonstrations took place to honour Hron's memory. In 1996, Hron posthumously received the inaugural Stig Dagerman Prize for free speech and world peace.

Hron's grave has since been desecrated several times by neo-Nazis. Murderer Daniel Hansson had previously stabbed a man in an earlier crime as a juvenile offender and was a teenage alcoholic, and at least two of the young murderers were suspected of having severe untreated mental instability and violent behaviour in their childhoods. Another one of the gang was part of a plot to violently attack a sports event. All of them were active neo-Nazis, some of them involved in the violent network Vitt Ariskt Motstånd (VAM, "White Aryan Resistance" in Swedish). Racist flyers and propaganda were found in their homes. During the murder they wore t-shirts with Adolf Hitler and other Nazi prints on and bomber jackets. In prison, Daniel Hansson was part of forming the criminal neo-Nazi prison gang "Ariska Brödraskapet" (a Swedish version of the Aryan Brotherhood but no ties or connections to the US gang has been made officially except inspiration). Mikael Fjällholm was later stabbed in the eye with a screwdriver during his prison sentence by another neo-Nazi (who at one point had been a suspect in the so-called "Fryshuset murder" in Stockholm) who wanted to join the gang, damaging him for life for having been the one who first "snitched" in early police interviews by naming the others. Daniel Hansson was sentenced after his release for more crimes, including abusing and beating his then-girlfriend.

John Hron's father has later described how he during the night/evening of the murder had strongly thought about going up to the lake to check on the boys, but that he decided not to because he felt it could have embarrassed the teenage boy.
