= Lea Gleitman =

Swedish Holocaust survivor

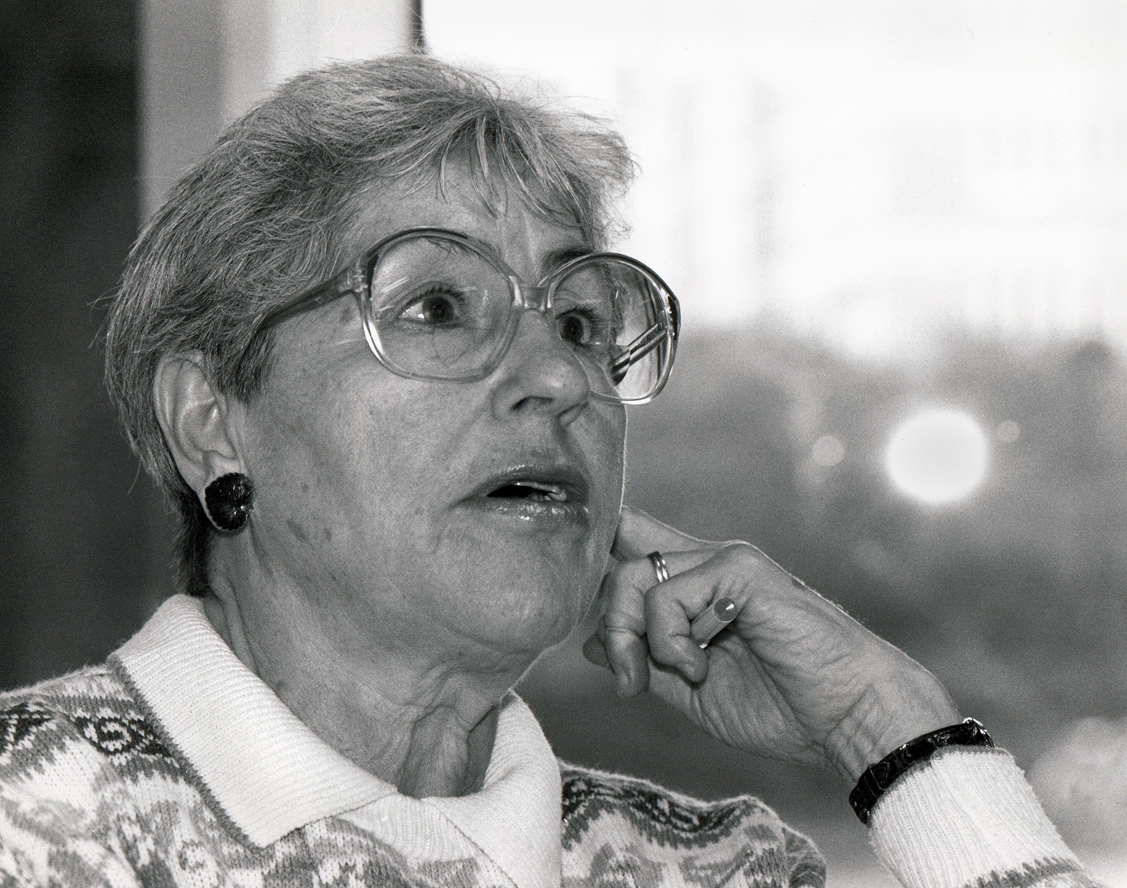
- Born: Lea Lorka Posner; 27 November 1924; Oświęcim, Poland
- Died: 27 June 2024 (aged 99); Malmö, Sweden

Lea Gleitman, née Posner (27 November 1924 — 27 June 2024) was a Swedish Holocaust survivor.

== Biography ==
Gleitman was born in Oświęcim to father Jonasz Chaim Posner, a fabric merchant and Szprinca Ernst Posner, a housewife. She had an older brother—Jehuda Zeev Wowek Posner, older sister—Miriam, and a younger sister—Berta Balcia. In 1932, her family moved to Sosnowiec to be closer to Chorzów where her father's store was located. Gleitman attended a Jewish school in Sosnowiec during this time. In 1932, Jonasz fled to Ostrów, near Lvov (now part of Ukraine). He was killed there during a German invasion in June of 1941. The rest of the family was forced to move to a ghetto but decided to leave Sosnowiec and travel to eastern Poland, which was then under Russian control. In 1942, the entire Gleitman family was forced into a sports field with 30,000 other Jews and most of the family was sent to the Auschwitz concentration camp where they were killed. Gleitman was sent to the Gräben labour camp, a sub-camp of Gross-Rosen concentration camp. In December 1944, she was forced on a death march and then placed in the Bergen-Belsen concentration camp.

On 15 April 1945, Gleitman was liberated by British troops from the concentration camp. Gleitman contacted her uncle, Moshe Posner, located in Copenhagen, who arranged for Swedish visas. When she learned that her sister Miriam was still alive, she traveled to pick up her sister in Poland, and together they then continued on to Sweden. On May 6, 1946 the sisters arrived in Malmo.

In 1991, Gleitman co-founded the Holocaust Eyewitnesses in Malmö (Berättargruppen Förintelsens efterlevande) after the emergence of Holocaust denial. She became a spokesperson, visiting schools across Sweden speaking about her experiences during her youth in Sosnowiec, the ghetto, and during the Holocaust.
