= Swedish Antisemitic Union =

Swedish Antisemitic Union (Swedish: Svenska Antisemitiska Föreningen) was an anti-Jewish organisation, established in 1923. It promoted hostility towards Jews and also used the Swastika. The Swedish Antisemitic Union was in a sense, a forerunner to the Nazi parties that later evolved in Sweden. The association also organized boycotts of Jewish-owned companies and among the organisations slogans was "Sweden for Swedes". The organisation ceased to exist in 1931.
