= 2013 Jyväskylä library stabbing =

Stabbing attack in Finland

Coordinates: 62.2386°N 25.7428°E

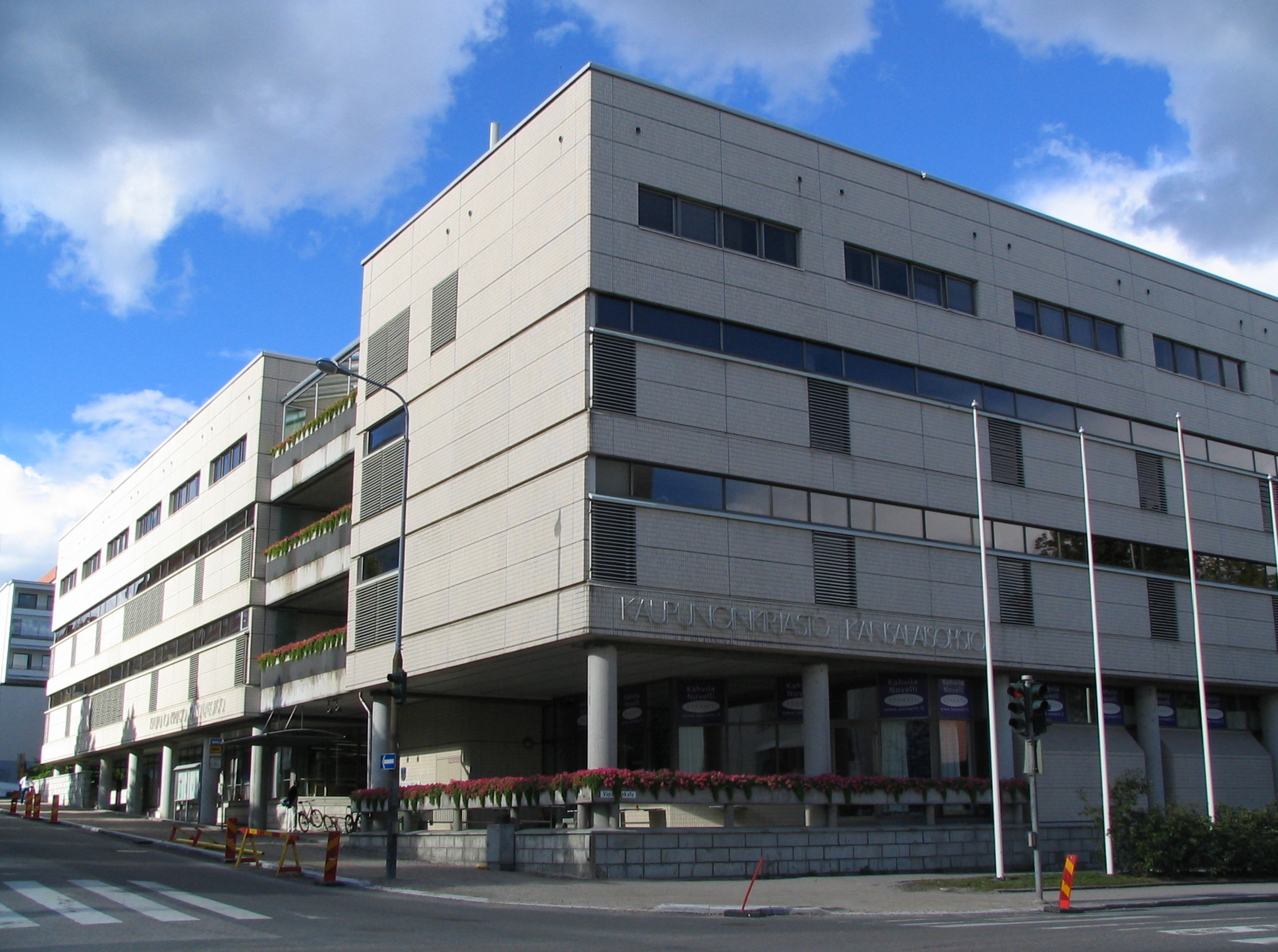
The Jyväskylä City Library and Civic Center.

The Jyväskylä library stabbing took place on 30 January 2013, when members of the Finnish Resistance Movement (Finnish: Suomen vastarintaliike), a branch of the Nordic Resistance Movement, had organized a demonstration in the city of Jyväskylä, Finland, and protesters assaulted three individuals as a group.

== Sequence of events ==
On 30 January 2013, members of the Nordic Resistance Movement, a far-right white nationalist political party in Sweden, Finland, Norway, Iceland, and Denmark, organized a demonstration within the city of Jyväskylä, Finland. The altercation occurred after a group of young men from the Nordic Resistance Movement who referred to themselves as "patriots" were denied access into a public event within the Jyväskylä Public Library. This said event was a discussion centered on the then recently published book entitled "The Far Right in Finland". The group then proceeded to assault the doorman and two individuals who were accompanying him. All three of the individuals received non-fatal injuries from the attack. Sources disagree on whether the man at the door was or was not a security guard.

According to the Helsinki Times, the police did not arrive on the scene until a second emergency call was placed.

One of three co-authors of the book and a member of the Helsinki City Council, Dan Koivulaakso, was present when the incident occurred.

The police reported that both of the combatants were armed but declined to specify what type of weapons were involved in the incident.

Later, in March 2013, a Neo-Nazi was taken into custody in connection with the stabbing. Upon entering his apartment building authorities found a USB stick containing a folder labeled "Jews". It contained about 300 photos and information, mostly regarding Finnish-Jewish teenagers.

== Aftermath ==
In March 2015, members of the Nordic Resistance Movement began to organize once again in Jyväskylä, Finland. One protest, in which more than forty individuals attended, resulted in heated clashes with the police. The police arrested thirty-two people including leading members of the Movement and a number of Swedish-speaking Finns and Swedes.

Later, in August 2015, members of the same organization assaulted three individuals, one of whom was one of the victims of the initial stabbing incident. The police arrested two Swedes: a twenty-five-year-old and a thirty-one-year-old.

== Reactions ==
- Finland: Minister of the Interior Päivi Räsänen condemned the initial attack, stating that she was opposed to all violence against the freedom of speech and assembly.
