= Nordic Resistance Movement =

Pan-Nordic neo-Nazi movement

- Insignia, a Tiwaz rune in an Ingwaz rune on green
- Founders: Klas Lund (SWE); Haakon Forwald (NOR); Esa Henrik Holappa (FIN)
- Leaders: Fredrik Vejdeland (SWE); Tommy Olsen (NOR); Antti Niemi (FIN); Joakim Johansen (DEN); Ríkharður Leó Magnússon (ISL)
- Founded: 1997 (Sweden); 1998 (Norway); 2006 or 2007 (Finland); 2016 (Iceland); 2017 (Denmark)
- Newspaper: Musta Kivi, Kansallinen Vastarinta (FIN); Nationellt Motstånd (SWE)
- Ideology: Anti-LGBT; Authoritarianism; Hard Euroscepticism; Neo-Nazism; Factions: Accelerationism; Esoteric Nazism
- Political position: Far-right
- Status: active
- Size: c. 2019; 150 to 300 (Sweden); 200 to 400 (Finland); Several dozen (Norway, Denmark, Iceland)
- Website: motståndsrörelsen.se (Swedish website)

The Nordic Resistance Movement (Note: Swedish: Nordiska motståndsrörelsen, NMR; Norwegian: Bokmål: Nordiske motstandsbevegelsen, NMB; Nynorsk: Nordiske motstandsrørsla NMR; Finnish: Pohjoismainen Vastarintaliike, PVL; Icelandic: Norræna mótstöðuhreyfingin, NMH; Danish: Den nordiske modstandsbevægelse, NMB) is a pan-Nordic neo-Nazi movement in the Nordic countries and a political party in Sweden. Besides Sweden, it is established in Norway, Denmark and Iceland, and formerly in Finland before it was banned in 2019. Terrorism expert Magnus Ranstorp has described the NRM as a terrorist organization due to their aim of abolishing democracy along with their paramilitary activities and weapons caches. In 2022, some members of the United States Congress began calling for the organization to be added to the United States Department of State list of Foreign Terrorist Organizations. On 14 June 2024, the United States Department of State designated NRM and its leaders as Specially Designated Global Terrorists (SDGT).

== Formation and structure ==
In December 1997, Klas Lund and some other former members of the White Aryan Resistance (Swedish: Vitt Ariskt Motstånd, also known as VAM) – a militant neo-Nazi network active from 1991 to 1993 – were released from prison after being convicted of robberies, bombings and killings, among other things. They formed the Swedish Resistance Movement (Svenska Motståndsrörelsen or SMR) together with individuals working with the neo-Nazi magazine Folktribunen and members of Nationell Ungdom ("National Youth"), a neofascist and openly racist organisation known for the murder of the anarchist Björn Söderberg.

In 2016, the Nordic Resistance Movement was formed, with separate affiliates in Sweden, Finland, and Norway; a Danish affiliate was later disbanded. The Nordic Resistance Movement advocates an immediate stop to what they call mass immigration to the Scandinavian countries, and the repatriation of people who are not of Northern European or of closely related descent. It also advocates Nordic self-sufficiency and withdrawal from the European Union.

On 28 February 2018, The Verge reported that Discord had shut down a number of neo-Nazi and alt-right servers, including that of the Nordic Resistance Movement, from their private chat platform for abuse of their Terms of Service.

In 2024, the NRM was designated a terrorist organization by the United States, which weakened the group by freezing its American assets and blocking it from the American financial system. The group is also weakened by a change in leadership and an ageing membership.

== Ideology ==
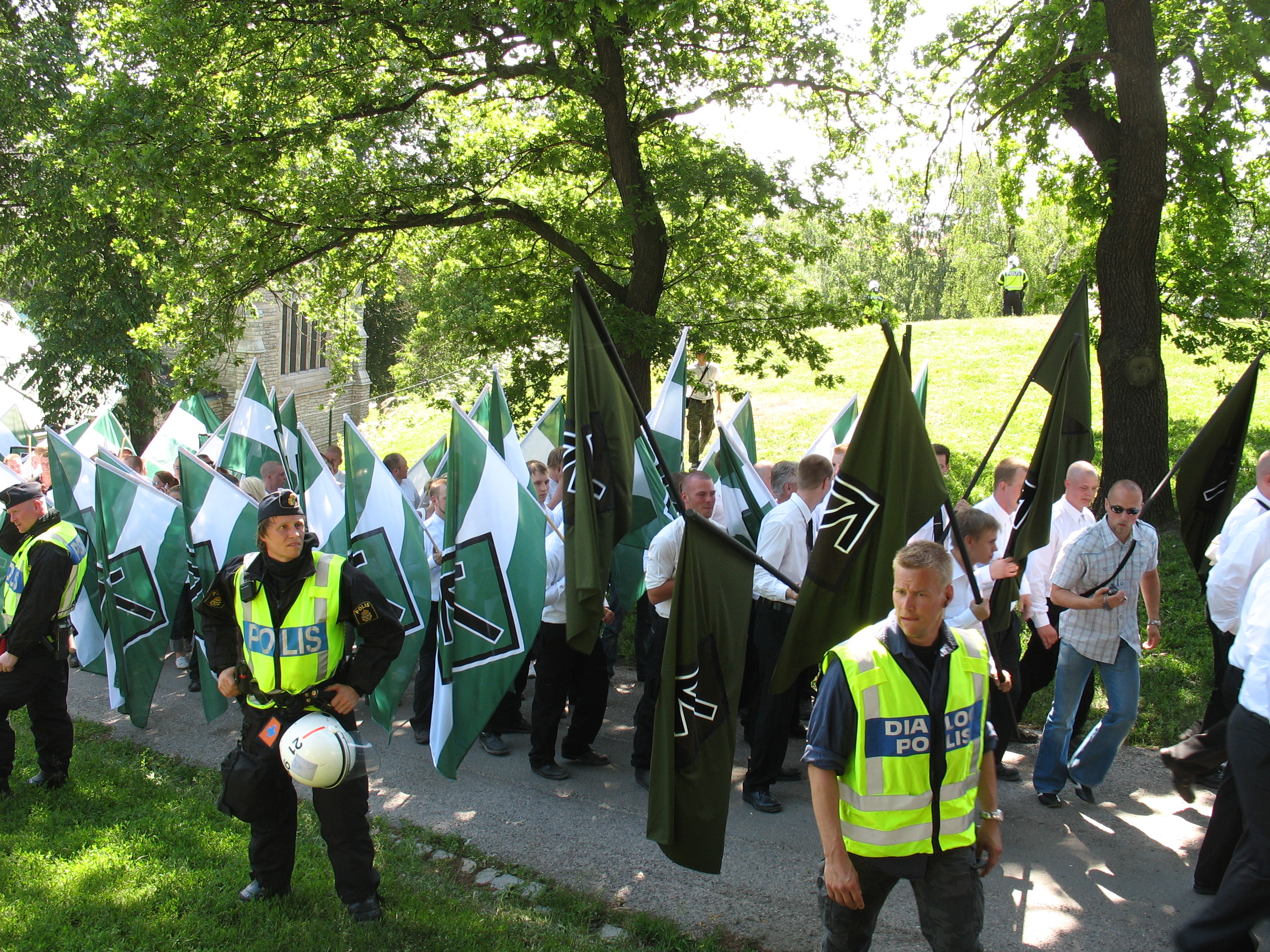
Nordic Resistance Movement demonstration

The aim of Nordic Resistance Movement is to establish a Pan-Nordic neo-Nazi republic "consisting of the Nordic countries Sweden, Finland, Norway, Denmark, Iceland and possibly even the Baltic countries".

The organization says its struggle will require bloodshed:

No man can join the Resistance Movement if he cannot or is not willing to defend himself, his organization, or his comrades with violence.... Weaklings and cowards have no place with us. No one should be able to evade their male duty.
The only terrible or shameful thing about young Swedes injuring or killing strangers and enemies is that all other Swedes do not support them when the mass media starts its smear campaigns.

— Excerpt from the NRM's newspaper Folktribunen

The NRM has praised figures such as Adolf Hitler, Corneliu Codreanu, Hugo Chávez, Savitri Devi, George Lincoln Rockwell and Robert Jay Mathews in their publications. Their main tactics are distributing leaflets and making public speeches in inner-city areas in support of neo-Nazism, denouncing immigration. They also publish the Nationellt Motstånd magazine. NRM-affiliated far-right activist Tobias Bratt created the 2017 neo-Nazi propaganda film Europa: The Last Battle.

== Sweden ==
The Nordic Resistance Movement was founded by Klas Lund as the Swedish Resistance Movement (Swedish: Svenska motståndsrörelsen). In 2020, its leader was Simon Lindberg, and its political wing was managed by Pär Öberg. It is known for its opposition to non-white immigration to Sweden. The NRM is considered a central actor in Sweden's white power movement. In November 2003 the Swedish Security Service raided homes of leading members, among them Lund, who was later sentenced to prison for illegal possession of firearms.

In May 2006, the Nordic Resistance Movement announced that the National Youth organisation and all its activities and members had been merged with the SRM. In December 2013, armed NRM members attacked an anti-racist demonstration in Stockholm which resulted in riots and clashes. Many were arrested afterwards. In the 2014 Swedish election, two members of the NRM were elected to Sweden Democrats seats in the municipal councils in Ludvika and Borlänge. In what has been described as a "coup" their names were added to Sweden Democrats' ballots that were open for additions. Late in 2015, the NRM was registered as a political party in Sweden, headed by the organization's spokesman, Pär Öberg.

Three men with ties to Swedish NRM were sentenced to prison for respectively eight and a half years, five years, and one and a half years on 7 July 2017 for three bombings in Gothenburg which took place in November 2016 and January 2017, one targeted at the trade union movement through the bombing of the syndicalist Syndikalistiskt Forum infoshop, echoing the 1999 Nazi murder of syndicalist Björn Söderberg and the subsequent firebombing of the SAC's industrial secretariat and museum located in Joe Hill's ancestral home. One person received life-threatening injuries at the bombing of a refugee centre in Västra Frölunda. They were convicted of two of the bombings. The men were part of a group of Swedish and Finnish neo-Nazis who went to Russia to receive military training in firearms and explosives from the Russian Imperial Movement. Police also arrested a Russian man connected to the RIM and NRM and confiscated two weapon caches.

On 30 September 2017, NRM staged a march with roughly 500 members taking part in Sweden's second largest city Göteborg, timed to coincide with the annual Göteborg Book Fair. Fighting broke out between NRM and counter-demonstrators. Twenty-two NRM members including the organisation's leader Simon Lindberg were arrested on suspicion of violent public disorder, and one counter-demonstrator was arrested on suspicion of attacking a police officer. Swedish Jews were outraged at the demonstration, which took place on the Jewish holiday of Yom Kippur and was originally planned to pass near a synagogue. The march was re-routed and shortened following a court ruling.

On 19 April 2018, fireworks were thrown at the U.S. embassy in Stockholm during a protest against the bombing of Syria. One NRM man was arrested. The same month a member was arrested for plotting to assassinate journalists. Police confiscated a shotgun from the man. On 6 July 2018, members of the NRM assaulted two pro-Israel activists in Gotland.

Swedish-Estonian NRM member Oskar Laas was deported to Estonia in 2021 as a threat to national security for his extremist views. Laas' father was a founder of the local department of the EKRE and took part in NRM demonstrations, as did the younger Laas with another Estonian friend. Laas had taken pictures with his friend in face masks holding the book Siege, and attended events of Blue Awakening and Atomwaffen Division in Estonia.

On 6 July 2022, during Almedalen Week, Ing-Marie Wieselgren died after being stabbed at Donners plats in Visby. The arrested perpetrator was a 33-year-old man who had previously participated in events organized by the NRM and had written for the neo-Nazi website Nordfront.

In May 2022, the Swedish police arrested a man from Falköping for possessing firearms and powerful explosives. The police allege the man plotted mass shooting and bombing. According to Vice News the man possessed material by NRM, Iron March and Atomwaffen Division.

In April 2024, the NRM attacked a Roma encampment and destroyed it, and later the same month they attacked an antifascist gathering, assaulting the attendants and throwing smoke bombs. Three antifascists were beaten so badly they were hospitalized.

On 9 July 2025, the Swedish police came to arrest an NRM member in Östersund for violent threats when he started shooting at the police. The police threw a stun grenade at him and subdued him. The police had previously confiscated a firearm cache from the man due to his association with the NRM.

The NRM organized a torch march held in memory of the murdered skinhead Daniel Wretström in December 2025. Some 200 people attended the event.

The NRM secured 4.7% of votes in Campus Manilla elections, attended among others by princes and princesses of Sweden, sparking discussion of youth radicalization. The principal of the school stated that he will have to overhaul the political curriculum in response to the result.

== Election results ==
=== Riksdag ===
Election year	Votes	%	Seats	+/−	Government
2018	2,106	0.03 (#18)	0 / 349	New	Extra-parliamentary
2022	847	0.01 (#23)	0 / 349	0	Extra-parliamentary
2026	355	0.01 (#22)	0 / 349	0	Extra-parliamentary

=== European Parliament ===
Election	# of overall votes	% of overall votes	Seats	+/−
2019	644	0.00 (#34)	0 / 20	New

=== Nordic Strength ===
Nordic Strength (Swedish: Nordisk Styrka) is an underground paramilitary group, formed in August 2019 by the most hard-line NRM members who reject the parliamentary-oriented mass-organization strategy of the Swedish group as insufficiently radical. The group describes itself as an "activist organization" ("kamporganisation") and maintains very strict physical standards for its members. The members of the group have been convicted of over 100 violent crimes and weapon offenses and use an old church in Västmanland as their headquarters. Virtually nothing else is known about the underground sect of the already secretive group.

== Finland ==
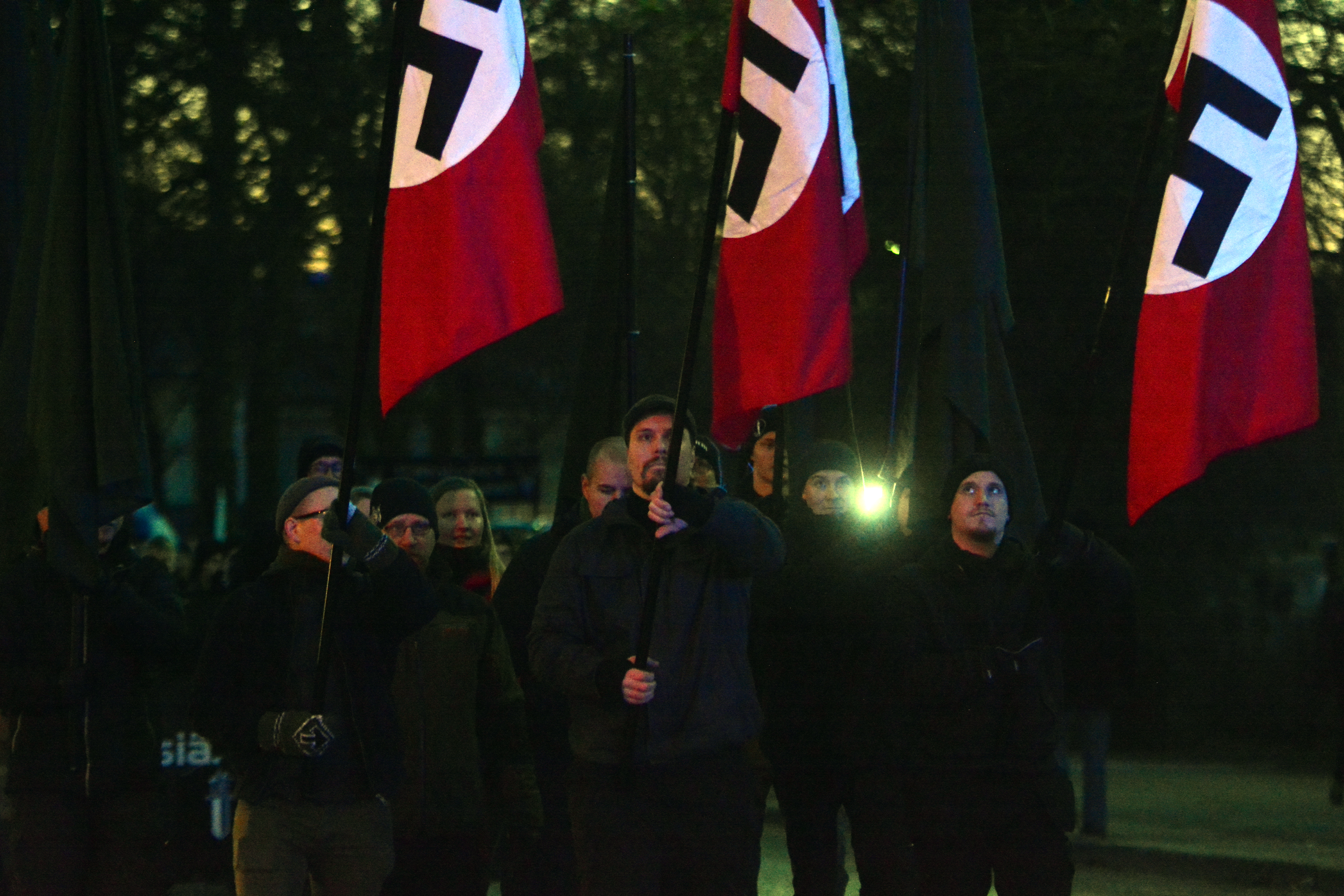
NRM Finnish independence day demonstration, 2018

Pohjoismainen Vastarintaliike is the Finnish branch of the Nordic Resistance Movement. It was founded by Esa Henrik Holappa, who would later abandon neo-Nazism and leave the group. Its current leader is Antti Niemi. Some of the group's activities include planting of propaganda posters and organizing demonstrations. Members also participate in hand-to-hand combat and shooting training arranged by the organization. The group also advocates pan-Finno-Ugrism, or "Kindred-folk ideology" ("Heimoaate"), and unification with ethnically Finnic Estonia is part of the group's program.

The organisation is responsible for multiple violent crimes, including attacking anti-racism and gay pride demonstrations and stabbing participants of a left-wing event. According to an investigation by Yleisradio, two thirds of the members have a conviction for a violent crime. The NRM is responsible for the 2016 Helsinki Asema-aukio assault in which an involved antifascist died later. The group also awarded the title of "activist of the year" to a member convicted of torturing a man to death and possessing illegal weapons. The group assaults people they consider political enemies in their homes, a practice they dub "home visits". In 2020, a campaign chairman was left critically injured after being beaten with a clawhammer in his home in Jämsä. A man connected to the group is charged with attempted murder along with another man. The NRM also vandalized the Israeli embassy over 20 times and defaced synagogues, causing the Finnish ambassador to be called to the Israeli foreign ministry in Jerusalem twice. On 5 December 2020, Finnish police arrested a NRM member for murdering a fellow member, this time in Riihimäki. On 17 March 2021, Finnish police arrested another NRM member and confiscated several crates of explosives from his apartment.

The NRM along with other nationalist organizations organizes an annual torch march demonstration in Helsinki in memory of the Finnish SS Battalion on the Finnish independence day, which ends at the Hietaniemi cemetery where members visit the tomb of Carl Gustaf Emil Mannerheim and the monument to the Finnish SS Battalion. The event has been protested by antifascists, which has led to counterdemonstrators being violently assaulted by the NRM members who act as security. The demonstration attracts close to 3000 participants according to the estimates of the police and hundreds of officers patrol Helsinki to prevent violent clashes. The march has been attended and promoted by the Finns Party, and condemned by left-wing parties, for example Green League MP Iiris Suomela characterized it as "obviously neo-nazi" and expressed her disappointment in it being attended by such a large number of people. The event also attracts neo-Nazis from abroad and has been attended by the NRM's foreign allies like Junge Nationalisten, who praised the event and compared it to the Battle of Helsinki, "when Germans and Finns marched side by side and liberated the city from the communists".

In addition to violent crimes, the NRM is closely connected to the proscribed terrorist organization National Action. A Finnish corporal who had served in Afghanistan and was a member of both the NRM and National Action was convicted of terror offenses and membership in the proscribed organization while living in Llansilin. The leader of National Action, Benjamin Raymond, also visited the NRM in Finland and held speeches and was pictured posing with an assault rifle. The NRM also closely cooperates with the neo-Nazi military formation Azov Battalion: Olena Semenyaka, spokeswoman of the paramilitary battalion, mentioned a "foreign legion in Ukraine that international volunteers could join, as well as military training camps at the Azov camp in eastern Ukraine." In 2019, an NRM delegation visited an Azov camp in Kyiv. Dozens of the Finns are also part of the Iron March terror network, famous for spawning the Atomwaffen Division. The group distributes the magazine Musta Kivi advocating esoteric Hitlerism and the Order of Nine Angles, and Musta Kivi has published serialized Finnish translation of ONA's Hostia and has promoted 21 Paths to the Kingdom of Darkness. NRM also sells books by Savitri Devi and ONA adept Kerry Bolton of the Black Order. It also promotes and sells Siege by James Mason that exhorts accelerationism and terrorism. Representatives of the NRM visited James Mason in the United States in 2019 with a touring NRM-affiliated Finnish neo-Nazi music collective, "Bolt of Ukko" (Ukonvasama).

Even though the Finnish NRM rejects parliamentarism unlike the Swedish branch, there have been numerous cases where members of the Finns Party have attracted criticism from the other parties and antifascists for attending events organized by or with the NRM. Several members of the Finns Party took part in an event where the participants shot and threw knives at targets, using photos of members of the Rinne Cabinet and attended an event commemorating Eugen Schauman, who assassinated Nikolay Bobrikov. Finns Party Youth members and leaders also attend "Etnofutur" ethnonationalist conferences in Estonia organized by the Blue Awakening together with the NRM. The founder of Blue Awakening and current MP for EKRE Ruuben Kaalep has been described as a neo-Nazi and connected to the local proscribed terror group and Atomwaffen affiliate Feuerkrieg Division.

On 30 November 2017, the Pirkanmaa District Court banned the Nordic Resistance Movement in Finland for having "flagrantly violated the principles of good practice". The ban was appealed and a request by the police for a temporary ban was turned down. In September 2018, the Court of Appeal in Turku upheld the ban. In March 2019, the Supreme Court placed a temporary ban on the group. On 22 September 2020, the Supreme Court upheld the ban. The Supreme Court noted in its ruling that "The use of violence linked to the organization's activities has to be considered a part of the organization's operations. ... The operating methods that were considered unlawful represented a substantial part of the organization's operations, and [the organization] only engaged in a limited amount of other types of activities".

The National Bureau of Investigation suspects the Nordic Resistance Movement to be continuing its operations under the names Kohti Vapautta!, Atomwaffen Division Finland and Suomalaisapu. In its annual threat assessment for 2020, the bureau found that despite the ban, the threat of far-right terrorism had risen and identified 400 persons of interest "motivated and with the capacity to perform terrorism in Finland". International links and funding networks were pointed out as a special source of concern. According to the University of Oslo Center for Research on Extremism:

Some NRM activists have reasoned that only radical measures will be effective post-ban, thus coming to support e.g. the accelerationist model of activity. Certain members of the group have also appeared as contributors to publications that promote esoteric forms of neo-Nazism. A corresponding shift towards a more "cultic" direction has also been observed in the United Kingdom after the banning of the National Action (NA).

In mid-June 2024, there was a series of racist stabbings in Oulu. One of the perpetrators, Juhani Sebastian Lämsä, was on the terror watchlist for connections to the outlawed terror group NRM. Lämsä was found guilty on two charges of attempted murder, but will not face prison time due to a court-ordered psychological assessment which found him not criminally accountable for his actions. Prior to these attacks Lämsä had been convicted for the stabbing of a person at a library in Jyväskylä, as well as the pepper-spraying of the Left Alliance politician Dan Koivulaakso at a Pride event. Another perpetrator of the 2024 Oulu attacks was a supporter of the NRM as well. The third attacker was unaffiliated. The three men stabbed several people with a perceived immigrant background, causing life-threatening injuries.

=== Åland ===
According to Helsingin Sanomat in connection with an article on NRM members in Åland, in 2026 the islands have attracted Swedish neo-Nazis since homeschooling is legal there unlike in Sweden. In general the attitude is more permissive: a man that was a member of the Finnish NRM is a teacher in a Mariehamn school despite openly calling himself "a National Socialist" and doing Nazi salutes in social media. When the principal was questioned, he simply described him as a good teacher and the rest did not concern him.

== Norway ==
Nordiske Motstandsbevegelsen is the Norwegian chapter of the Nordic Resistance Movement, founded by Haakon Forwald, former member of Dissection and Misanthropic Luciferian Order. The leader of the Norwegian branch is Tommy Olsen. They are organized in four subchapters (or nests) in Norway. In 2014, Norwegian police confiscated illegal submachine guns and automatic rifles from a member. In 2019, another member was arrested after hijacking an ambulance, trying to ram a police car and driving into a crowd. Inside the ambulance the police discovered a shotgun and Uzi submachine gun. Norwegian-Russian neo-Nazi Yan Petrovsky was active in NRM and was arrested at the home of a leading Norwegian NRM member Ronny Bårdsen and subsequently deported back to Russia as a threat to national security. Petrovsky was previously trained by RIM and was a founding member and second-in-command of the Rusich Group.

== Iceland ==
There have been newspaper articles since 2016 on ties of the movement to Iceland, and it has a website with an Icelandic Internet domain. The Icelandic branch is called Norræna Mótstöðuhreyfingin, but often called Norðurvígi.

In September 2019, between 10 and 15 Swedish members of the Nordic Resistance Movement staged an event at Lækjartorg in Reykjavík where they spread flyers and promoted the organisation. The event sparked an anti-Nazi demonstration a few days later which drew an estimated 200 participants.

== Denmark ==
Nordiske Modstandsbevægelse, led by Joakim Johansen, is the Danish branch of the Nordic Resistance Movement. In 2019, on the anniversary of the Kristallnacht a Jewish graveyard was vandalized by Danish NRM members in the town of Randers. In 2021, a Jewish graveyard was vandalized on the Passover in the city of Aalborg. Benny Dagan, Israeli ambassador to Denmark, responded that "Nazi Nordfront has to be outlawed." A 29-year-old man from Ishøj was arrested on 9 December 2024 and charged with nine counts of inciting terrorism for his promotion of accelerationist material. The man also shared a communique from Brandon Russell, founder of the terror group Atomwaffen and Terrorgram propaganda. Johansen had described the man as "friend of [NRM]" and having attended events of the organization. The man was sentenced to six years in jail for terrorism offenses.

NRM member Christian Dissing Poulsen was convicted in September 2019 of vandalizing a communist bookshop in Århus. Danish NRM member Niels Kristensen was convicted together with a Swedish NRM member of assaulting a counterdemonstrator to Rudolf Hess memorial march in Denmark.

On February 15, 2026, three Danish NRM members were arrested for carrying knives in public. They were part of a bigger Nazi skinhead gang in Copenhagen affiliated with the NRM. They have shared pictures of openly holding NRM banners and doing mass Nazi salutes around the city. According to Danish Redox, the local NRM members pay tribute to Terrorgram, 764 and Order of Nine Angles which makes them particularly dangerous.

There is also an NRM affiliated neo-Nazi gang gathering in Ørstedsparken consisting of Danes and Ukrainians, who were filmed with a Nazi Reichskriegsflagge flag. The group also shared videos in the social media of beating up non-European minorities in the park and vandalizing LGBT displays.
