= Siavosh Derakhti =

Swedish activist (born 1991)

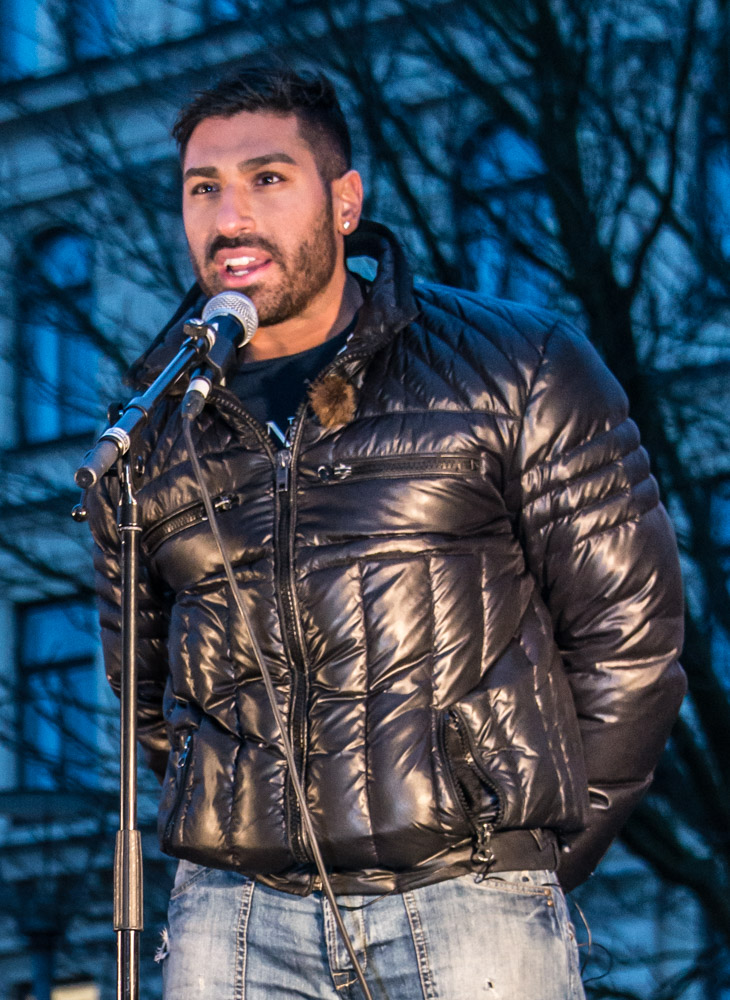
- Born: July 3, 1991 (age 35); Sweden
- Occupation: Founder of Young People Against Anti-Semitism and Xenophobia
- Known for: Social activism

Siavosh Derakhti (Persian: سیاوش درختی; born July 3, 1991) is a Swedish social activist, founder of Young People Against Anti-Semitism and Xenophobia. In 2016, Derakhti was named by Forbes magazine to its list of 30 influential leaders under the age of 30. In recognition of his activism to reduce prejudice and xenophobia, the government of Sweden presented him in 2013 with the Raoul Wallenberg Award, an honor named after the Swedish diplomat who saved thousands of Jews from Nazi death camps during WWII. The selection committee said Derakhti set a "positive example" in his hometown of Malmö and throughout Sweden. "He is a role model for others," the Wallenberg Award committee wrote, "showing through his actions and determination that one person can make a difference." On Nov. 8, 2012, the Swedish Committee Against Antisemitism gave Derakhti its first Elsa Award, established by Committee member Henrik Frenkel in memory of his parents to encourage young people to incorporate social media into the battle against Swedish antisemitism.

== Early life and education ==
Derakhti was born in Sweden to Iranian Azerbaijani immigrant parents who had escaped Iran during its war with Iraq, in search of an easier, safer life in Scandinavia. Although his father was a microbiologist and his mother a graduate in business and economics, as refugees they were initially unable to find work. He said, "My parents fled from dictatorship so their children could grow up in a peaceful place and experience democracy." When he was 7 years old, his two best friends were a Jewish student and a Roma student, and he learned to protect them from bullying and discrimination. His father remembers being subject to discrimination in Iran for being part of the Azerbaijani minority. As part of his effort to teach his son about the evils of discrimination and persecution, Derakhti's father first took him to Bergen-Belsen when he was 13 and to Auschwitz when he was 15.

== Activism against bigotry and xenophobia ==
Derakhti's activism against xenophobia began as a school project when he attended Malmö’s Latinskola High School and organised a class trip to a concentration camp. He went to the education department himself to secure funding. He was ultimately successful in bringing 27 students to Auschwitz, where many of his classmates openly wept. "I wanted to build bridges between Jews and Muslims in Malmö because antisemitism is a problem in the city. After that I realised how great the need was to talk about this. Now I work to combat all kinds of xenophobia." in 2010, when he was 19, Derakhti founded the organisation 'Young Muslims against Antisemitism', which is now known as 'Young People against Antisemitism and Xenophobia'. Sia, as he is known, travels throughout Sweden and gives presentations at schools, businesses and public organizations on the "equal dignity of all human beings." His team has also started a program for youth ambassadors, organized visits to concentration camps and sponsored training for young people involving exercises on cooperation and values. In addition to combating anti-Semitism, the organization intends to fight Islamophobia, Antiziganism sentiment and homophobia, though Derakhti prefers to remain focused and face one issue at a time.

When the first Raoul Wallenberg Prize was awarded in 2013, to “a person who is working to increase knowledge among children and youths on xenophobia, intolerance and the equal dignity of all human beings”, Siavosh Derakhti received both the honor and the prize money of 100,000 SEK for his work with Young People against Anti-Semitism and Xenophobia. As a result of the prize, he had the opportunity to meet U.S. President Barack Obama, who met and congratulated Derakhti for his work during the president’s 2013 visit to the Great Synagogue of Stockholm.

The Washington Post noted that Sweden is home to a growing population of Muslim immigrants, some of whom are openly hostile to Sweden's Jewish community. But Islamic studies expert Eli Gondor observes that many of the immigrants from the Arab world have experienced years of anti-Israel as well as anti-Semitic propaganda in their home countries. Derakhti notes however, that “these are not Swedish values. And if they want to live in Sweden, they have to adapt." He believes that it is important to set limits and encourage immigrants to embrace the values of their new homeland.

In 2015 Derakhti was invited to Washington, D.C., to meet with the Obama administration, senior officials from the National Security Council and the State Department. During the same visit he was one of three activists against anti-semitism to accept the Human Rights First Award, bestowed by the group of the same name.

In 2017, he started to report the many death threats against him he received, from Swedish Palestinians among others, to police.
