= Klas Lund =

Swedish neo-Nazi and criminal (born 1968)

- Born: Klas Henrik Pontus Lund; 14 February 1968 (age 58); Lidingö, Stockholm, Sweden
- Known for: Founder of the White Aryan Resistance, Nordic Resistance Movement and Nordic Strength

Klas Henrik Pontus Lund (born 14 February 1968) is a Swedish neo-Nazi and since 2019 the leader of the combat organisation Nordic Strength.

Lund is one of the founders of White Aryan Resistance (VAM), and was leader of the Swedish Resistance Movement (SMR) from 1997, now part of the wider movement known as the Nordic Resistance Movement (NMR).

== Biography ==
Lund was sentenced to four years in prison for the manslaughter of Ronny Landin, who in 1986 had intervened in an attack against three immigrants in Nynäshamn. He was released after two years.

In 1990, Lund and two others founded the White Aryan Resistance, an underground racist group that became a centre for some of Sweden's most militant far-right extremists. He ran a skinhead office at Fryshuset which functioned as a recruiting base for VAM and where their magazine "Storm" was printed.

In 1991 he was sentenced to six years in prison for a bank robbery in Vemdalen, in which members of VAM used weapons from a heist against a police station in Lidingö. He has several convictions for illegal possession of weapons. He founded the Swedish Resistance Movement and became its first leader in 1997. He was the leader of the group until 2015.

In October 2004 he escaped from prison in Mariestad, where he was serving six months for illegal possession of weapons. He was apprehended in March 2005, in Kristiansand, Norway.

== Nordic Strength ==
In August 2019 several leading members left NMR and established the paramilitary organisation Nordic Strength, with Lund as the leader. They considered the NMR's political strategy not sufficiently radical. The breakaway group describes itself as an elite combat organisation with tough physical requirements of its members.
