= 21 polkua pimeyden valtakuntaan =

2018 terrorist essay collection based on the Order of Nine Angles

- Author: Louhi Lodge
- Language: Finnish
- Genre: Religion, terrorism, satanism
- Publication date: 2018
- Publication place: Finland
- Pages: 99

21 polkua pimeyden valtakuntaan (English: 21 Paths to the Kingdom of Darkness) is a collection of essays in Finnish that largely presents the tenets of the Order of Nine Angles (ONA or O9A). The movement supports militant accelerationism, i.e. promoting the collapse of society through terrorism and sabotage. The movement's worldview combines theistic Satanism and far-right ideology; the movement despises the typical forms of Satanism in Western countries. The idea of the O9A, represented by the book 21 polkua pimeyden valtakuntaan, is also marginal in the circles of both esotericists and extreme right-wingers. However, the current gained somewhat more visibility in Finland around the years 2018–2024.

According to researcher Jussi Sohlberg, 21 polkua pimeyden valtakuntaan was published in 2018. The O9A's writings were already published in Finnish on Ylilauta in 2017. The translators urged readers to rise up in armed rebellion. The police have regarded the book as a guide on the "satanic path" to human sacrifice and terrorism. The author of the Finnish work is unknown, and there may have been several authors. The author of the book is named "Louhi lodge", not to be confused with the Louhi Lodge of the Star of Azazel satanist movement that supports civil rights and egalitarianism.

== Contents ==
21 polkua pimeyden valtakuntaan presents practical tips for planning murders and recommends different ways of doing it. The book suggests supporters of democracy, human dignity and equality, anti-fascists, sex offenders, foreign drug dealers or people called "economic refugee" as targets for murder. According to the book itself, it represents a fanatical, elitist and violent world view. The book considers God to be non-existent, but declares a belief in the "Powers of Darkness", which are "forces operating on the acausal level of existence".

The book describes the Sinister Path, to which those who begin the initiation are called "adepts". The book describes various rituals, which include, among other things, perpetrating a human sacrifice. In the chapter "The Culling" it is argued that human sacrifice is a tradition that unites all of humanity, signs of which have been found all over the world. According to its introduction, 21 polkua pimeyden valtakuntaan seeks to guide people to actions that would bring the current age to its conclusion. At the end of the book, the "Ceremony of Recalling " is described, where a 21-year-old man is sacrificed by slitting his throat on the summer solstice every 17 years. The "Ceremony of Recalling" is taken from the Grimoire of Baphomet of the Order of Nine Angles. It requires voluntary submission from the human sacrifice and after the murder, pastries are recommended to be made from the victim's blood for ceremonial purposes.

The guide also discusses, among other things, learning close combat skills and survivalism.

== Public hearing and criminal investigations ==
The book attracted attention in Finland after the police linked it to far-right terrorism in their investigations. The book was part of the reading list of the suspects in both the Lahti terrorism case and the Kankaanpää terrorism arrests. The police believed that the leader of the group suspected of terrorism in Kankaanpää had started to go through the path presented in the book. The person who received the longest sentence for the Lahti terrorism case, who talked about the murder of Sanna Marin among other things, had 21 polkua pimeyden valtakuntaan in his possession. The ideological current of the terrorist incident in Lahti was the extreme right trend known as Siege-culture.

The author of the book states that he is from the Tampere region and that he was 16 years old in 1996. In the spring and summer of 2023, the police feared that a forty-year-old man from Ylöjärvi was preparing a ritual murder according to the book's teachings. The National Bureau of Investigation monitored the man's phones and watched his home due to the suspicion. The same person was suspected of sending letter bombs to the party offices of Social Democrat, Green and Left party offices in several cities in February 2023. Based on the messages they found on the phone of the man from Ylöjärvi and the nickname "Herra Kansa" (Herrenvolk) associated with the man, the police began to suspect that the man from Ylöjärvi had also participated in writing the book. An altar belonging to him was found in a forest. The eventual charges were incitement to commit a crime and illegal threats made with terrorist intent. The man is known to have published satanic fiction, analyses written for a far-right online publication and articles for the Finns Party think tank. He is a former member of Finns Party and had written texts on the party's blog page that have since been deleted. The texts had discussed security issues and accelerationism. Riikka Purra, leader of the Finns Party condemned the plans described by the police and considered them delusional.

In November 2023, Finns Party politician Jiri Keronen said that he is republishing the 21 polkua pimeyden valtakuntaan. He considered testing the limits of freedom of speech to be important and considered the situation "quite analogous" to the Päivi Räsänen trial if republishing the book 21 polkua pimeyden valtakuntaan itself would be the subject to prosecution.

== See also ==
- Atomwaffen Division Finland, a Finnish satanist Nazi terror group
- Pekka Siitoin, prominent Finnish satanist and Nazi
- Boris Popper, prominent Finnish satanist and Nazi
