= Murder of Daniel Wretström =

2000 Swedish murder case

Daniel Wretström
- Born: Daniel Juhani Wretström; 15 October 1983; Timrå, Sweden
- Died: 9 December 2000 (aged 17); Salem, Sweden
- Cause of death: Stab wound

Daniel Juhani Wretström (15 October 1983 – 9 December 2000) was a Swedish nationalist of Finnish descent and white power skinhead murdered by a gang of immigrants in Salem, Sweden.

== Background ==
Wretström played drums in the white power rock band "Vit Legion" ("White Legion").

Wretström lived with his mother, Birgitta, and sister, Sara. His middle name Juhani indicates a Finnish ethnic background. According to Birgitta, Wretström had been diagnosed with ADHD. She described him as a "searcher", who attended a Pentecostal church.

== Murder ==
Following a conflict or argument at an apartment party in Salem and while drunk and upset at a nearby bus station close to a local youth center, a fight broke out between Wretström and a group of other teens. It is alleged that a girl in the group accused Daniel of having hit her, but this could never be proven and is mentioned in the investigation as having been made up by the girl who was angry at Daniel because of his skinhead outfit. The group of youths followed him at the bus station. Some male teens in the group began attacking Daniel and the whole gang, which the media described as being "from immigrant backgrounds", began assaulting him. While he was being beaten, a car passed by which Daniel attempted to stop by throwing himself onto the hood, but the gang dragged him off the car's hood and told the driver to go away. They then kicked him down into a ditch, and hit him in the head repeatedly with a board. One assailant then called his older brother, who arrived at the scene armed with a knife and stabbed Daniel multiple times in the neck and throat, killing Daniel by cutting his throat. The knife's broken and bloody blade was later found by the police. Some people passing by had tried to stop the attack to no avail and later returned and found Daniel's body and called the emergency services. According to the woman who called, it took approximately 40 minutes for the police and ambulance to arrive. While the witnesses were waiting they flagged down a security guard's car who followed them to the scene.

== Impact ==
Wretström's murder inspired Swedish neo-Nazis, ultra-nationalists and other far-right activists to organize an annual demonstration known as the Salem March. Those activists consider Wretström to be a martyr to their cause. The neo-Nazi group Blood and Honour has called him "the Horst Wessel of our generation", vowing to exact revenge. Blood and Honour wrote "Here is the Horst Wessel of our generation—the figurehead of a new movement—to whom we each owe a blood debt to unite. This morning Europe weeps for a fallen hero. Mark this day—for he shall be avenged. Though his flash has fallen—his spirit lives on." Their demonstrations drew a response from the Swedish group Antifascistisk Aktion.

The murder became the topic in many heated debates and articles in Swedish media, political papers and in Swedish society at that time, and the motives and cause of the murder is still debated even today. The far-right immediately accused multicultural society and left-wing politics and has often protested at media calling Wretström a Nazi, while many journalists and papers often mentioned the brawl at the party as the motive. The official police investigation leaves it unclear what really caused the fight and murder since there was many accused and many witnesses who gave different versions of the events.

Stieg Larsson, then the editor of Expo, an anti-racist magazine, denied that the Expo organisation had ever defended the murder of Wretström, pointing out that the Turkish-born journalist Kurdo Baksi had been one of the first to condemn the perpetrators.

== Legal proceedings ==
The perpetrators were arrested and prosecuted and because of their young age, most were sentenced to youth facilities or community service. The accused murderer who stabbed Wretström was ruled insane at the time of the murder by the court and sentenced to psychiatric care. He was given a new identity and released after 4 years.
