= National Socialist Front =

National Socialist Front Nationalsocialistisk front
- NSF's coat of arms
- Abbreviation: NSF
- Leader: Anders Ärleskog; Daniel Höglund (realm council)
- Founded: 8 August 1994
- Dissolved: 22 November 2008
- Preceded by: White Aryan Resistance
- Succeeded by: Party of the Swedes
- Headquarters: Karlskrona
- Newspaper: Den Svenske Nationalsocialisten
- Ideology: Neo-Nazism
- Political position: Far-right
- Colours: Blue Yellow

Party flag
- Party flag used from 1994 to 2003 Party flag used from 1999 to 2008

Website
- www.nsfront.info (archived)

The National Socialist Front (Swedish: Nationalsocialistisk front, NSF) was at the time of its dissolution the largest Neo-Nazi political party in Sweden. The organization was founded in Karlskrona on 8 August 1994. It became a political party on 20 April 1999, the 110th birthday of Adolf Hitler. The party's official newspaper—now defunct—was named Den Svenske Nationalsocialisten ("The Swedish National Socialist"), also known as Den Svenske ("The Swedish").

The party ran in the municipal council elections in Karlskrona in 2002, but only attracted 0.5% of the votes which was not sufficient for a mandate. In 2006 the party entered the elections at a national level. There it gained 1,417 votes, or 0.03% (in order to enter the Swedish parliament a party needs at least 4% of the total votes). The party was most successful in Trollhättan, where it received 208 votes or 0.65%, although this was not enough to enter the municipal assembly. 2006 was the best election year in the party's history.

In 2007, the NSF demonstrated in Stockholm for the release of Holocaust denier Ernst Zündel.

The party had as its main goals the abolition of democracy, the repatriation of immigrants, internment of communists into work camps, a repeat of the Holocaust and the implementation of scientific racism and cutting taxes for families with many genetically healthy children. The NSF also launched a campaign to defend Mel Gibson over the criticism he received from Abraham Foxman for making the film The Passion of the Christ.

The National Socialist Front had a mandatory political uniform dress code during marches and demonstrations, which included a black combat-sweater or shirt, black military-cap, boots, khaki-coloured combat pants and the party's logo on the arms. This uniform was taken out of use after the police stated in 2006 that it was a hate crime to wear them during demonstrations. The members of the party often wore a blue T-shirt with yellow text that said "NSF" after this.

== History ==
The party was formed in 1994 by a number of sympathisers of the former White Aryan Resistance (Swedish: Vitt Ariskt Motstånd) in Karlskrona. From the beginning 1994 to December 1999, the party was led by Anders Högström. When he left, he introduced a so-called reich council consisting of Anders Ärleskog and Daniel Höglund. Anders Högström left NSF to instead become involved in the Social Democrats. As of April 1999, the National Socialist Front saw itself as a party political organization, but never registered a party designation.

Several people related to the organization were convicted of violent crime which was against the public. Among other things, the perpetrators of the Malexander murders 1999 had connections to NSF. One of the perpetrators, Andreas Axelsson, had previously been a member of NSF for a short period, and an ex-neo-Nazi, Yugoslav Wars mercenary and war criminal Jackie Arklöv, who assumed responsibility for the shooting of the two policemen, had written a letter to NSF's partition.

The National Socialist Front was sometimes focused on media because of outward activities such as demonstrations and fly-spreading. NSF's former uniform was abolished before the 2006 election and then a blue T-shirt with yellow text was often used on which it was called "NSF". The previous uniforms included: black military-like cap, party logo tags on the arms, black long-sleeved sweater, beige combat pants and optional black boots. Among the propaganda party spread there was an extensive sale of white power products, including CDs, via the Internet.

== Party program ==
The organization was hierarchically structured with a central management and subgroups. The action program showed that the organization worked for, among other things, national self-sufficiency, repatriation of all overseas immigrants, establishing a state race control to "secure the mental and biological health of the Nordic race" as well as state control of mass media. The overall objective was to "pave the way for a national socialist power access" and then abolish democracy. The National Socialist Front would introduce a people's government under the Nordic leadership and responsibility principle, consisting of expert representatives selected within the various professions, which would only serve the people in the country of birth. Even the death penalty for serious sexual offenses and treason was included in the program. The organization wanted Sweden to exit from the European Union and the United Nations. The party also wanted to abolish the aid to communist states and dictatorships.

== Dissolution ==
The National Socialist Front was officially dissolved on 22 November 2008. A new party, the People's Front ("Folkfronten"), was founded at the same time with the same people in charge. The People's Front was later reconstituted as the Party of the Swedes which ran in the 2010 and 2014 general elections and received about 1,000 votes in the 2014 election to the European Parliament, before being dissolved the following year.

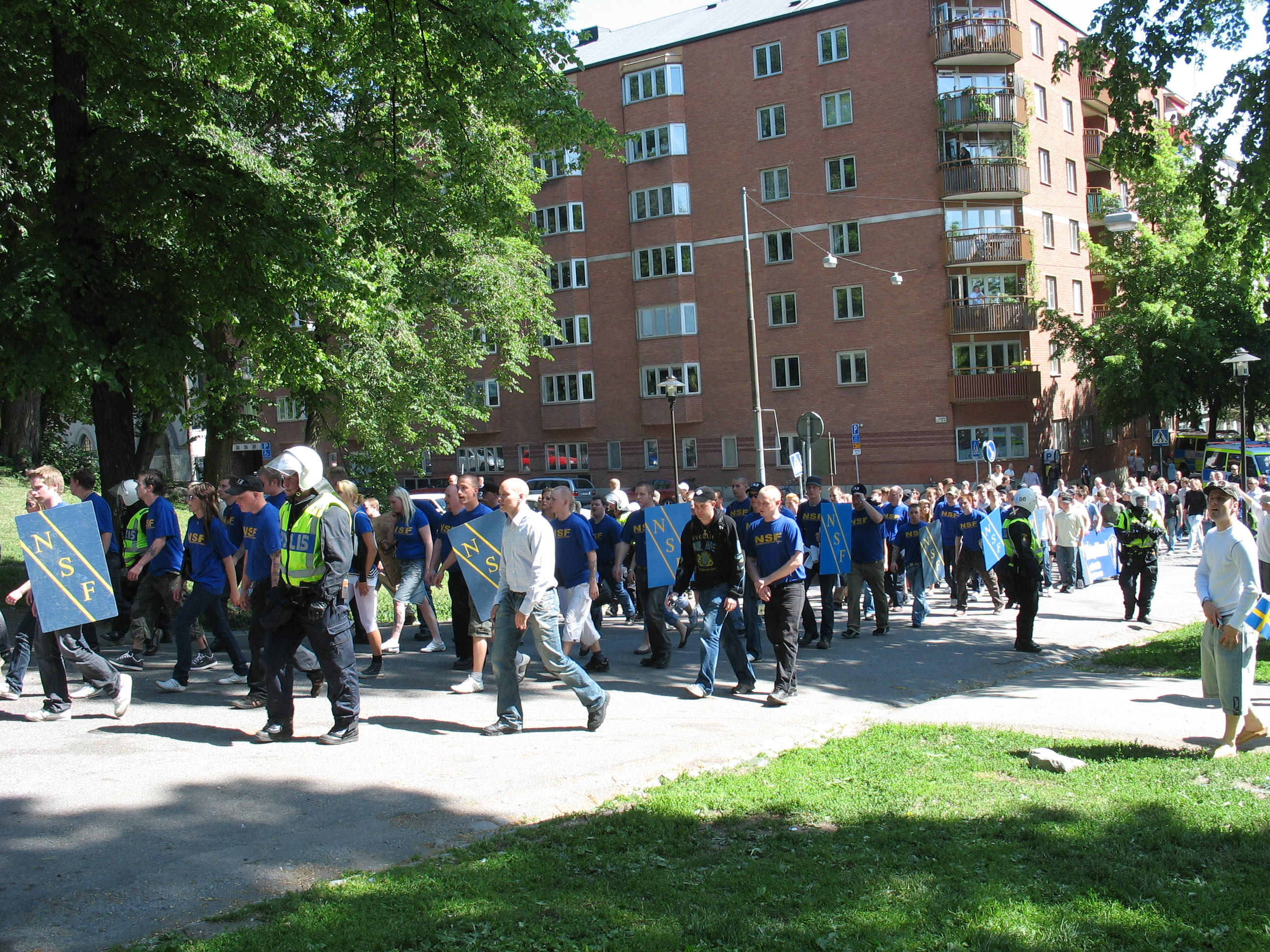
National Socialist Front members participating in a demonstration during Sweden's National Day, June 6, 2007.

== Electoral results ==
=== Riksdag ===
Election year	# of overall votes	% of overall vote	# of overall seats won	±	Notes
2006	1,417	0.03 (#16)	0 / 349	New	Extra-parliamentary
