= White Aryan Resistance (Sweden) =

Swedish neo-Nazi group

White Aryan Resistance Vitt Ariskt Motstånd
- Successor: Nordic Resistance Movement; National Socialist Front
- Formation: 1991
- Founder: Klas Lund
- Dissolved: 1993
- Type: Neo-Nazi white supremacist movement

White Aryan Resistance (Swedish: Vitt Ariskt Motstånd, VAM) was a militant neo-Nazi network active in Sweden between 1991 and 1993.

== Overview and history ==
The name of the group was derived from the US white supremacist organisation White Aryan Resistance (WAR). According to Stieg Larsson, a researcher of white supremacist organizations, the group was rather styled on the then already defunct US white supremacist group The Order, led by Robert Jay Mathews.

VAM was founded by Klas Lund, who had been convicted of manslaughter as a young man and was radicalized in prison. Other leading members were Torulf Magnusson and Peter Melander, editor of the group's magazine Storm. Another prominent member was Christoffer Rangne. The organisation's symbol was the "Wolfsangel" with a sword in the center and an unofficial "uniform" in public demonstrations consisting of all-black patroller caps, bomber jackets and boots.

The main goal of VAM was to start an armed revolution and/or race war to seize the power over Sweden or at least parts of it and turn it into a totalitarian modern nazi regime.

VAM and supporters to the network were behind many serious crimes in Sweden. On April 11, 1991, Klas Lund and three others from VAM broke into the Lidingö police station where they tied a radio dispatcher and stole more than 30 pistols as well as ammunition. They planned to use the weapons in what they called a "white revolution."

That same spring, Lund and his companions were arrested at a army weapons storage in Upplands Väsby in Stockholm. They were released while awaiting trial but when searching one of the men's homes the police found clear evidence that a terrorist organization was being formed by the suspects.

At that time the suspects had gone underground and was hiding from authorities. During their brief time underground, Lund and Rangne robbed a bank in Vemdalen in July the same year. Several of the men, including Lund and Rangne, were arrested and sentenced to prison for, among other things, these crimes.

Klas Lund and Rangne were seen as "heroes" in militant neo-Nazi circles in Sweden and a wave of bomb threats was phoned in by people demanding these convicted VAM members be released. Some Swedish white power music bands dedicated songs to the prisoners, calling them "prisoners of war".

VAM and their logo and flag appeared on several white power music albums, magazines and at concert shows with such bands and in several neo-Nazi demonstrations and marches at that time.

According to a report prepared and jointly published in November 1999 by Sweden's four largest daily newspapers, Aftonbladet, Expressen, Dagens Nyheter and Svenska Dagbladet, many former members of the organisation are members of present-day neo-Nazi organisations.

After his time with VAM and serving a prison sentence, Klas Lund founded the self-declared Swedish Resistance Movement in 1997, which later became the Nordic Resistance Movement. Another VAM offshoot was the now-defunct National Socialist Front which was formed in 1994.

=== Other incidents and crimes ===
VAM has also been linked to several crimes committed by people identified as supporters to VAM but not always strict members of the network.

In 1993 three youths with connections to VAM burned down the mosque in Trollhättan, completely destroying the building.

On August 17, 1995 in Kode, Gothenburg, teenager John Hron was tortured to death by a group of older neo-Nazi youths, some of whom had propaganda material from, and supported, VAM.
