= Order of Nine Angles =

Satanic and left-hand path occultist group

- One of the ONA's principal symbols is an inverted seven-pointed star (septagram) enclosed within a circle, known as the "Seven-Fold Sigil" or "Septenary Sigil".
- Abbreviation: ONA or O9A
- Founded at: Shropshire, United Kingdom
- Type: Satanist group
- Location: Worldwide

The Order of Nine Angles (ONA or O9A) is a Satanic left-hand path network that originated in the United Kingdom, but has since branched out into other countries. Claiming to have been established in the 1960s, it rose to public recognition in the early 1980s, attracting attention for its neo-Nazi ideology and activism. Describing its approach as "Traditional Satanism", it also exhibits Hermetic and modern pagan elements in its beliefs.

According to the Order's own claims, it was established in the Welsh Marches of Western England during the late 1960s by a woman previously involved in a secretive pre-Christian tradition. This account adds that in 1973, a man named "Anton Long" was initiated into the group, subsequently becoming its grand master. Several academics who have studied the ONA believe that "Anton Long" is probably the pseudonym of the British neo-Nazi activist David Myatt; he denies this. From the late 1970s onward, Long wrote books and articles which propagated the Order's ideas; in 1988, the organization launched its own journal, Fenrir. Through these ventures, it established links with other neo-Nazi Satanist groups around the world, among them the Tempel ov Blood in the United States and the Black Order in New Zealand. During the 2000s, the ONA furthered its cause through embracing the Internet. By the 2010s it was attracting further attention for its influence over neo-Nazi militant groups such as Atomwaffen Division and National Action as well as broader extremist networks like 764.

The ONA promotes the idea that human history can be divided into a series of aeons, each of which contains a corresponding human civilization. Adherents believe that the current aeonic civilization is that of the Western world, but that the evolution of this society is threatened by the "Magian/Nazarene" influence of the Judeo-Christian religion, which the Order seeks to combat in order to establish a militaristic new social order, which it calls the "Imperium". According to Order teachings, this is necessary in order for a galactic civilization to form, in which "Aryan" society will colonise the Milky Way. It advocates a spiritual path in which practitioners are required to break societal taboos by isolating themselves from society, committing crimes, embracing political extremism and violence, and carrying out acts of human sacrifice. ONA members practice magic, believing that they are able to do it by channeling energies into their own "causal" realm from an "acausal" realm where the laws of physics do not apply, and these magical actions are designed to help them achieve their ultimate goal of establishing the Imperium.

The ONA eschews any central authority or structure; instead, it operates as a broad network of associates – termed the "kollective" – who are inspired by the texts which were originally authored by Long and other members of the "inner ONA". The group is composed largely of clandestine cells, which are called "nexions". Some academic estimates suggest that the number of individuals who are broadly associated with the Order falls in the low thousands. Various rapes, killings, and acts of terrorism have been perpetrated by far-right individuals influenced by the ONA, with various British politicians and activists calling for the ONA to be proscribed as a terrorist group. ONA has subsequently been banned as a terrorist group in New Zealand.

== Definition ==
The ONA has been characterised as a new religious movement. The group presents its teachings as "Traditional Satanism", and various scholars of religion have described it as Satanic. The scholar Jesper Aagaard Petersen called the ONA's teachings a "new interpretation of Satanism and the left-hand path". Other scholars have offered similar descriptions; Per Faxneld described the ONA as "a dangerous and extreme form of Satanism", while Fredrik Gregorius called it "one of the most controversial and infamous Satanic groups of the twentieth century". Religious studies scholar Graham Harvey thought that the ONA fit the stereotype of the Satanist "better than other groups", like the Church of Satan, in large part due to its embrace of "deeply shocking" and illegal acts. Conversely, the scholar of religion George Sieg argued that the ONA should be categorised as "post-Satanic" because it has "surpassed (without fully abandoning) identification with its original satanic paradigm".

Other scholars have portrayed it principally as an overlap between Satanism and Nazism; the historian Nicholas Goodrick-Clarke called it a "Satanic Nazi cult", while the specialists in far-right politics Jeffrey Kaplan and Leonard Weinberg characterised it as a "National Socialist-oriented Satanist group". Further academic descriptions have highlighted other links; the religious studies scholar Connell R. Monette called it a "blend" of Satanism with Hermeticism and "some pagan elements", while the historian of religion Ethan Doyle White characterised it as a group existing at the intersection of the Satanic and modern pagan milieus. Considering the manner in which the ONA had syncretized both Satanism and Heathenry, the historian of religion Mattias Gardell described its spiritual perspective as "a heathen satanic path". With the recent (post-2020) appearance of ONA in American and European news media, historical scholarship has examined the relationship between ONA's unique esoteric tradition and violent political accelerationism to characterize the movement as neo-fascist.

Alternative definitions have been provided by counter-terrorism organisations. The Global Network on Extremism and Technology for instance labels the ONA a "decentralised esoteric militant accelerationist network of threat actors". The ONA has been described as "occult-based neo-Nazi and racially motivated violent extremist group" by the United States government.

== History ==
=== Origins ===
The ONA's first cell, "Nexion Zero", was established in Shropshire (pictured).

Academics have found it difficult to ascertain "exact and verifiable information" about the ONA's origins given the high level of secrecy it maintains. As with many other occult organisations, the Order shrouds its history in "mystery and legend", creating a "mythical narrative" for its origins and development. In its writings, the ONA has claimed that accounts of its history are "just stories and tales [...] to be accepted, or rejected, on that basis" and that it does not maintain that they are "accurate and/or describe historical events".

The ONA's writings claim the group as a descendant of pre-Christian pagan traditions which survived the Christianisation of Britain. These, it maintains, were passed down from the Middle Ages onward in small groups or "temples" based in the Welsh Marches – a border area between England and Wales – each of which was led by a grand master or a grand mistress. These claims to an ancient pre-Christian heritage run counter to established scholarly understandings of British history, but reflect a belief common among modern pagans in mid-20th century Britain. Parallels have for instance been drawn with Wicca, whose early followers claimed to be part of an ancient pre-Christian religion.

According to the Order's writings, in the late 1960s, a grand mistress of one of these temples united three of them – Camlad, the Temple of the Sun, and the Noctulians – to form the ONA. She then welcomed outsiders into the tradition, one of whom was "Anton Long", an individual who described himself as a British citizen who had spent much of his youth visiting Africa, Asia, and the Middle East. Long claimed that prior to his involvement in the ONA he had been interested in occultism for several years, having contacted a coven based in Fenland in 1968, before moving to London and joining groups that practiced ceremonial magic in the style of the Hermetic Order of the Golden Dawn and Aleister Crowley. He also claimed a brief involvement in a Satanic group based in Manchester, the Orthodox Temple of the Prince run by Ray Bogart, during which time he encountered the ONA Grand Mistress. According to the Order's account, Long joined the ONA in 1973 – the first person to have done so in five years – and he became the grand mistress's heir. He later recalled that at that time the group held rituals at henges and stone circles around the solstices and equinoxes.

This account further states that when the Order's Grand Mistress migrated to Australia, Long took over as the group's new grand master. The group claimed that Long "implemented the next stage of Sinister Strategy – to make the teachings known on a large scale". From the late 1970s onward, Long encouraged the establishment of new ONA groups, which were known as "temples", and from 1976 onward he wrote various texts for the tradition, codifying and extending its teachings, mythos, and structure. These texts are typically written in English, although they include passages of Classical Greek as well as terms from Sanskrit and Arabic, reflecting Long's fluency in such languages. Goodrick-Clarke described these texts as evoking "a world of witches, outlaw peasant sorcerers, orgies and blood sacrifices at lonely cottages in the woods and valleys" of the Welsh Marches. It emerged at about the same time as the Order of the Black Ram, an American neo-Nazi Satanist organization, one of the first such groups.

==== Anton Long's identity ====
The real identity of "Anton Long" remains unknown both to members of the Order and to academics who have studied it. However, a 1998 issue of the anti-fascist magazine Searchlight claimed that "Anton Long" was a pseudonym of David Myatt, a prominent figure in the British neo-Nazi movement. Shared ideas between the two include the belief in an "acausal" realm where the laws of physics do not apply, the idea that human history divides into distinct aeons, support for the future colonisation of space, and the "Star Game," a board game that Myatt claimed to have developed in 1975.

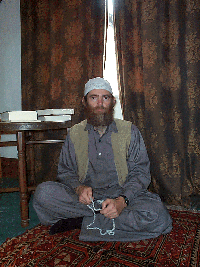
David Myatt, pictured in 1998, is often cited as the central ideologue in the ONA.

Born in the early 1950s, Myatt had a long history in neo-Nazism, serving as a bodyguard for Colin Jordan of the British Movement before joining the Combat 18 militia and becoming a founding member and leader of the National Socialist Movement. In 1973, Myatt has claimed, he formed an occult group to serve as a "honeypot" to pull occultists toward neo-Nazism, but that he left its organisation largely to a man from Manchester. Myatt's text on A Practical Guide to Aryan Revolution, in which he advocated violent militancy in aid of the neo-Nazi cause, was cited as an influence on the nail bomber David Copeland. In 1998, Myatt converted to Islam and remained a practicing Muslim for eight years, in which time he encouraged violent jihad against Zionism and Israel's Western allies. In 2010, he announced that he had renounced Islam and was practicing an esoteric tradition that he termed the "Numinous Way"; Gregorius characterised this as "a type of Hellenistic Pantheism".

Academic scholars of esotericism who have supported Long's identification as Myatt include Goodrick-Clarke, Per Faxneld, and Jacob C. Senholt. Senholt presented additional evidence that he believed confirmed Myatt's identity as Long, writing that Myatt's embrace of neo-Nazism and radical Islamism represented "insight roles" which Myatt had adopted as part of the ONA's "sinister strategy" to undermine Western society. In 2015, an ONA member known as R. Parker argued in favour of the idea that Myatt was Long. As a result of Page's publication, the sociologist of religion Massimo Introvigne stated that the ONA has "more or less acknowledged" that Myatt and Long are the same person. The ONA have utilised this ambiguity, in 2018 issuing a publication titled A Modern Mysterium: The Enigma of Myatt and the ONA containing essays both arguing for and against the case that Myatt is Long.

Myatt has repeatedly denied allegations that he has any involvement with the ONA, maintaining that he has never used the pseudonym "Anton Long". He has claimed that he had personal contacts with people involved in the ONA around the 1980s, and that similarities between his ideas and those of the ONA result from the latter's borrowing from him. Some scholars have argued that Myatt's identification as Long remains circumstantial. Kaplan suggested that Myatt and Long are separate people, while Sieg thought the association was "implausible and untenable based on the extent of variance in writing style, personality, and tone" between Myatt and Long. Doyle White suggested that 'Long' could be one of the individuals involved in Myatt's "honeypot" occult group, hence explaining the borrowings from Myatt's ideas. Monette posited the possibility that "Anton Long" was not a singular individual but rather a pseudonym used by several different people.

=== Public emergence ===
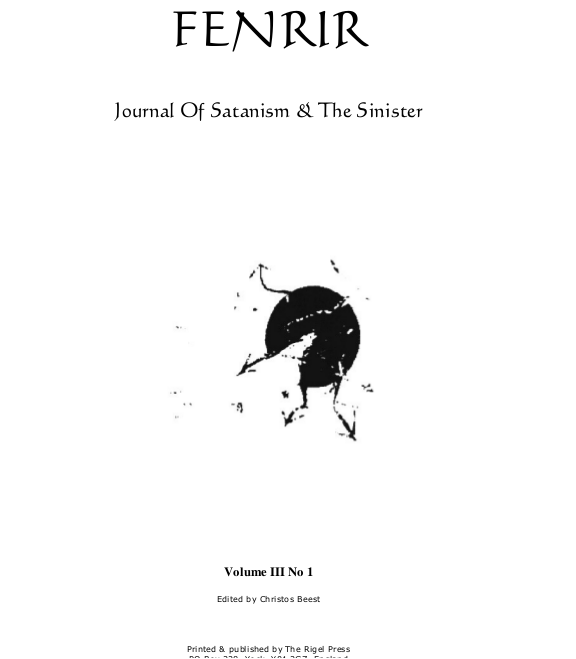
An issue of the ONA's original Fenrir magazine

The ONA came to public attention in the early 1980s. At this point, Gregorius noted, it was "most likely very small, possibly having only one or two actual members." Over coming years it issued material for public consumption, including philosophical tracts, ritual instruction, letters, poetry, and gothic fiction. Published in 1984, the Black Book of Satan was a core ritual text; Long claimed that it was an embellished version of a text previously used by the Temple of the Sun. During the 1980s and 1990s, the Order spread its message through articles in magazines, and in 1988 it launched its own journal, Fenrir. The ONA has also issued its own music, painted tarot set known as the Sinister Tarot, and a three-dimensional board game known as the Star Game.

During the early 1990s, the Order stated that it was entering the second stage of its development, in which it would leave behind its prior focus on recruitment and public outreach within the occult community and instead focus on refining its teachings. Its resulting quietness led some occultists to speculate that the ONA had become defunct.

The 1990s also saw the emergence of several Satanist groups espousing explicitly far-right political positions, among them the Brotherhood of Balder, the Order of the Sinister Way, and the White Order of Thule. The ONA established links with some of these other neo-Nazi Satanist groups: its international distributor was New Zealander Kerry Bolton, the founder of the Black Order. Bolton is described as an ONA adept in the group's published letter-correspondence. Also associated was the U.S.-based Tempel ov Blood, which published various texts through Ixaxaar Press. Another is the California-based White Star Acception, which has been designated as the ONA's "Flagship Nexion" in the United States, despite diverging from mainstream ONA teachings on a number of issues. The ONA also has access to a private library of occult and far-right material owned by the Order of the Jarls of Bælder.

=== Twenty-first century spread ===
In 2000, the ONA established a presence on the Internet, using it as a medium to communicate with others and to distribute its writings. In 2008, the ONA announced that it was entering the third phase in its history, in which it would once again focus heavily on promotion, utilising such social media as online blogs, forums, Facebook, and YouTube to spread its message. In 2011, the "Old Guard", a group of longstanding members of the Order, stated that they would withdraw from active, public work with the group. In March 2012, Long announced that he would be withdrawing from public activity, although he appears to have remained active in the Order.

According to Monette, as of 2013 the group had associates and groups in the United States, Europe, Brazil, Egypt, Australia, and Russia. Links were for instance built between the ONA and the Nordic Resistance Movement, a neo-Nazi group in Scandinavia. In the United States, the influence of the ONA was cited over the Atomwaffen Division, a neo-Nazi group formed in 2015; the latter's website Siege Culture promoted the ONA publication Hostia. According to journalist Nate Thayer, at least nine members of the ONA-affiliated Tempel ov Blood held key positions in Atomwaffen Division.

The ONA's influence was also observed over the Atomwaffen Division's British branch, the Sonnenkrieg Division, and over another neo-Nazi group, National Action. The leader of the ONA's Yorkshire nexion, Ryan Fleming—who was convicted for sexual abuse in 2011 and in 2017—was a National Action member. A purported leader of the Mexican eco-terrorist group Individualists Tending to the Wild also claimed to have drawn influence from the ONA and Tempel ov Blood. According to Monette, some ONA members join the military and the police to perform killings. Since 2020 some examples have surfaced. Some members of the neo-Nazi Rusich Group adhere to ONA satanism.

In 2019, Nick Lowles, founder of the British anti-extremism group Hope Not Hate, stated that the ONA was then "becoming more visible and influential than ever" due to the internet, drawing in young people looking for the "edgiest" positions they can find. In 2024 Wired reported that "In recent years, ONA has become ever-present in the most violent corners of the contemporary far-right." Its visual aesthetics were for instance widely adopted within the 764 network that emerged from the United States in 2021. The publishing house Martinet Press, run by Tempel ov Blood founder Joshua Caleb Sutter, in particular contributed to the rise of ONA and its connection to 764. In 2021, court proceedings against Atomwaffen Division leader Kaleb Cole revealed that Sutter since 2003 has been paid over $140,000 by the FBI as a confidential informant. The FBI has not addressed Sutter's role.

In 2020, Hope Not Hate called on the UK government to proscribe the ONA for incubating terrorism. ONA books and texts were banned from distribution in Russia following a 2024 St. Petersburg court order. The group was outlawed as a terrorist organization in New Zealand in 2025.

== Organization ==
"The ONA is a diverse, and world-wide, collective of diverse groups, tribes, and individuals, who share and who pursue similar sinister, subversive, interests, aims and life-styles, and who co-operate when necessary for their mutual benefit and in pursuit of their shared aims and objectives... The criteria for belonging to the ONA is this pursuit of similar sinister, subversive, interests, aims and life-styles, together with the desire to co-operate when it is beneficial to them and the pursuit of our shared aims. There is thus no formal ONA membership, and no Old-Aeon, mundane, hierarchy or even any rules."

— The ONA, 2010

The ONA is secretive, and has been described as a secret society. It lacks any central administration, instead operating as a network of individuals which it terms the "kollective". There is no formal initiation into the Order and thus anyone can begin following the system outlined in its writings. Thus, Monette stated that the Order "is not a structured lodge or temple, but rather a movement, a subculture or perhaps metaculture that its adherents choose to embody or identify with". Monette suggested that this absence of a centralised structure would aid the Order's survival, because its fate would not be invested solely in one particular leader.

The ONA dislikes the term "member", instead favouring the word "associate". Most of those engaged with the Order's teachings appear to operate solitarily, although the group also comprises autonomous cells known as "nexions". The original cell, based in Shropshire, is known as "Nexion Zero", with the majority of subsequent groups having been established in Britain, Ireland, and Germany. Nexions and other associated groups have been established in the United States, Australia, Brazil, Egypt, Italy, Spain, Portugal, Poland, Serbia, Russia and South Africa. Some of these groups, such as the U.S.-based Tempel ov Blood, describe themselves as being distinct from the ONA while both having been greatly influenced by it and having connections to it. According to some ONA texts, certain nexions only permit membership to family members or close friends of existing members.

=== Outer representative ===
Monette wrote that "there is no central authority within the ONA," while Senholt believed that the group "does not award titles". Several academics have highlighted the existence of a position within the ONA called an "Outer Representative", who serves as an official spokesperson. The first to publicly claim to be the group's "Outer Representative" was Richard Moult, an artist and composer from Shropshire who used the pseudonym of "Christos Beest". Moult was followed as "Outer Representative" by "Vilnius Thornian", who held the position from 1996 to 2002, and who has been identified by ONA insiders as Michael W. Ford. Subsequently, the blog of the White Star Acception claimed that group member Chloe Ortega was the ONA's Outer Representative, while in 2013, an American woman using the name "Jall" appeared claiming the role. More broadly, references have also been made to an "Old Guard" of longstanding and senior group members. Individuals linked to this Old Guard have included Christos Beest, Sinister Moon, Dark Logos, and Pointy Hat, although in 2011 they stated that they would withdraw from the public sphere.

=== Niners, Balobians, and Rounwytha ===
In 2012, Long stated that those affiliated with the Order fell into six different categories: associates of traditional nexions, Niners, Balobians, gang and tribe members, followers of the Rounwytha tradition, and those involved with ONA-inspired groups. In the ONA's terminology, the terms "Drecc" and "Niner" refer to folk-based or gang-based culture or individuals who support the Order's aims by practical (including criminal) means rather than esoteric ones. One such group is the White Star Acception, who claim to have perpetrated rapes, assaults, and robberies in order to advance the group's power; Sieg noted that the reality of these actions has not been verified. A Balobian is an artist or musician who contributes to the group through their production of fine art.

The term Rounwytha is likely modelled on the Old English term rún-wita, meaning a person acquainted with secrets or mysteries. According to the ONA, the Rounwytha comprise a tradition of folk-mystics exhibiting psychic powers that reflect their embodiment of the "sinister feminine archetype". Although a minority are men, most Rounwytha are female, and they often live reclusively as part of small and often lesbian groups. ONA writings identify the Rounwytha largely with the Camlad group, which it claimed was based in parts of southern Shropshire and Herefordshire. Long reported that these Rounwytha were integrated into the ONA during the early 1970s, but that this was largely "in name only", for these members remained "independent and reclusive". The ONA further reported that by 2011 "the few extant traditional members [were] no longer" part of the ONA. Doyle White suggested that there "nothing intrinsically implausible" in the idea that Long might have been in contact with a small number of women, living in the Welsh Marches during the 1960s and 1970s, who were involved in esoteric practices and identified themselves as part of a group.

== Beliefs ==
=== Traditional Satanism and paganism ===
"[Long] rejects the quasi-religious organization and ceremonial antics of the Church of Satan, the Temple of Set and other satanic groups. He believes that traditional satanism goes far beyond the gratification of the pleasure-principle and involves the arduous achievement of self-mastery, self-overcoming in a Nietzschean sense, and ultimately cosmic wisdom. His conception of satanism is practical, with an emphasis on individual growth into realms of darkness and danger through practical acts of prowess, endurance and the risk of life."

— Scholar of esotericism Nicholas Goodrick-Clarke

Although it places little emphasis on the figure of Satan, the ONA describe their teachings as "Traditional Satanism". This is a term that has since also been adopted by theistic Satanist groups like the Brotherhood of Satan. Faxneld suggested that the Order's adoption of the word "traditional" was part of a "conscious strategy to build legitimacy" by harking back to "arcane ancient wisdom", drawing comparison with how some esotericists called their practices "traditional witchcraft" to distinguish themselves from the dominant form of modern witchcraft, Wicca.

R. Parker, a writer associated with the ONA, has stated that the group is not "strictly satanist or strictly Left Hand Path" but rather uses Satanism and the Left Hand Path as what it calls "causal forms", "that is, as techniques/experiences/ordeals/challenges" to encourage the practitioner on the path to wisdom. Parker described the Order more specifically as "a sinisterly-numinous mystic tradition".

The ONA strongly criticises other Satanist groups like the Church of Satan and the Temple of Set, deeming them "sham-Satanic" because they embrace the "glamour associated with Satanism" but are "afraid to experience its realness within and external to them". In the view of the ONA, these groups' attempts to codify themselves as institutions and profess their commitment to "ethical religion" replicates the dominant status quo rather than reacting against it. In turn, the Church of Satan has criticised what they alleged was the ONA's "paranoic insistence that they are the only upholders of Satanic tradition". Kaplan characterised these comments as being part of "the intramural tensions" common within "the world of Satanism".

Monette argued that "a critical examination of the ONA's key texts suggests that the satanic overtones could be cosmetic, and that its core mythos and cosmology are genuinely hermetic, with pagan influences." Modern pagan elements have also been identified in the Order's teachings. The group presents itself as having pre-Christian origins, describes Satanism as "militant paganism", and claims that the "true ethos" of Western civilisation is "pagan in essence". It has claimed that some practitioners undergo "black pilgrimages" to prehistoric ceremonial sites around Shropshire and Herefordshire, and, according to Goodrick-Clarke, publishes material evoking the idea of it being a tradition rooted "in English nature". Various references are made to aspects from Northern European pre-Christian mythologies, for instance the Anglo-Saxon notion of wyrd and the Norse wolf Fenrir. However, the ONA does not advocate the re-establishment of pre-Christian religions, with one ONA tract stating that "all past gods of the various Western Traditions are rendered obsolete by the forces which Satanism alone is unleashing".

=== The acausal realm and theology ===
The ONA teaches that humans live within the causal realm, which obeys the laws of cause and effect. They also believe in an acausal realm, in which the laws of physics do not apply. The group further promotes the idea that numinous energies from the acausal realm can be drawn into the causal, allowing for the performance of magic.

The Order claims that "Dark Gods" exist within the acausal realm, although it is accepted that some members will interpret them not as real entities but as facets of the human subconscious. These entities are perceived as dangerous, with the ONA advising caution when interacting with them. Among those Dark Gods whose identities have been discussed in the Order's publicly available material are a goddess named Baphomet who is depicted as a mature woman carrying a severed head. In addition, there are entities whose names, according to Monette, are borrowed from or influenced by figures from Classical sources and astronomy, such as Kthunae, Nemicu, and Atazoth.

Another of these acausal figures is named Vindex, after the Latin word for "avenger". The ONA believe that Vindex will eventually incarnate as a human – although the gender and ethnicity of this individual is unknown – through the successful "presencing" of acausal energies within the causal realm, and that they will act as a messianic figure by overthrowing the Magian forces and leading the ONA to prominence in the establishment of a new society.

Sieg drew comparisons between this belief in Vindex and the ideas of Savitri Devi, the prominent Esoteric Hitlerist, regarding the arrival of Kalki, an avatar of the Hindu god Vishnu, to Earth. The ONA propagate the idea that it is possible for the practitioner to secure an afterlife within the acausal realm through their spiritual activities. It is for this reason that the final stage of the Seven Fold Way is known as the "Immortal", constituting those initiates who have been able to advance to the stage of dwelling in the acausal realm.

=== Aeonic cosmology ===
The ONA is a millenarian group. It states that cosmic evolution is guided by a "sinister dialectics" of alternating Aeonic energies. It divides human history into a series of Aeons, believing that each Aeon was dominated by a human civilization that emerged, evolved, and then died. It states that each Aeon lasts for approximately 2,000 years, with its respective dominating human civilization developing within the latter 1,500 years of that period. It holds that after 800 years of growth, each civilization faces problems, resulting in a "Time of Troubles" that lasts from between 398 and 400 years.

In each civilization's final stage is a period that lasts for approximately 390 years, in which it is controlled by a strong military and imperial regime, after which the civilization falls. The ONA claims that humanity has lived through five such Aeons, each with an associated civilization: the Primal, Hyperborean, Sumerian, Hellenic, and Western. Scholars have argued that this system of Aeons was inspired by the work of Arnold J. Toynbee, and possibly also the notion of aeons presented in Crowley's Thelema.

The ONA claims that the current Western civilization has a Faustian ethos and has recently undergone its Time of Troubles, with its final stage, an "Imperium" of militaristic governance, due to commence at some point in 1990–2011 and last until 2390. This will be followed by a period of chaos from which will be established a sixth Aeon, the Aeon of Fire, which will be represented by the Galactic civilization in which an Aryan society shall colonize the Milky Way galaxy.

The Order holds that unlike previous Aeonic civilizations, Western civilization has been infected with the "Magian/Nazarene" distortion, which they associate with the Judeo-Christian religion. The group's writings state that while Western civilization had once been "a pioneering entity, imbued with elitist values and exalting the way of the warrior", under the impact of the Magian/Nazarene ethos it has become "essentially neurotic, inward-looking and obsessed", embracing humanism, capitalism, communism, as well as "the sham of democracy" and "the dogma of racial equality."

They believe that these Magian/Nazarene forces represent a counter-evolutionary trend which threatens to prevent the emergence of the Western Imperium and thus the evolution of humanity, teaching that this cosmic enemy must be overcome through the force of will. The Order is thus far more overtly politically extreme in its aims than other Satanic and left-hand path organisations are, seeking to infiltrate and destabilise modern society through magical and practical means. Both Goodrick-Clarke and Sieg note that these ideas regarding the "Magian soul" and "cultural distortion" brought about by Jews derive from the works of Oswald Spengler and Francis Parker Yockey.

=== Interest in Nazism and jihadism ===
"Adolf Hitler was sent by our gods
To guide us to greatness
We believe in the inequality of races
And in the right of the Aryan to live
According to the laws of the folk.
We acknowledge that the story of the Jewish "holocaust"
Is a lie to keep our race in chains
And express our desire to see the truth revealed.
We believe in justice for our oppressed comrades
And seek an end to the world-wide
Persecution of National-Socialists."

— The ONA's "Mass of Heresy"

If the identification of Long as Myatt is correct, then the ONA would have its ideological foundations in the neo-Nazi movement. The ONA's material contains various positive references to Nazism and neo-Nazism, praising Nazi Germany as "a practical expression of the Satanic spirit ... a burst of Luciferian light – of zest and power – in an otherwise Nazarene, pacified, and boring world." The ONA also evokes the Nazi leader Adolf Hitler as a positive force in its text for the performance of a Black Mass.

Embracing Holocaust denial, it claims that the Holocaust was a myth which was constructed by the Magian/Nazarene establishment in order to denigrate the Nazi administration after the Second World War and erase its achievements from "the psyche of the West". The group believes that a neo-Nazi revolution is necessary in order to overthrow the Magian-Nazarene domination of Western society and establish the Imperium, ultimately allowing humanity to enter the Galactic civilization of the future.

Senior group member Christos Beest, however, presents Nazi imagery as just one way in which the Order works, instead maintaining that they are "the only true anarchist group". While the group's Black Mass commonly invoked Hitler, another version—produced by Australian ONA group The Temple of THEM—replaces the Nazi leader with the Salafi jihadist Osama bin Laden. The group frames neo-Nazism and Salafi jihadism as "causal forms" which will help to bring down the old order and facilitate the coming of a new aeon. In this, some ONA texts present the support of neo-Nazism as arising not from a genuine belief in Nazi ideology, but as part of a "sinister strategy" to advance Aeonic evolution.

As the scholars Shanon Shah, Jane Cooper and Suzanne Newcombe have noted, there is a flexibility to the ONA's approaches which allow different groups and individuals affiliated with the movement to adopt different beliefs. The writings of Chloe Ortega and Kayla DiGiovanni, key publicists for the U.S.-based White Star Acception, express what Sieg termed a "left-anarchist" platform which lacked the condemnation of Zionism and the endorsement of Aryan racialism which is found in Long's writings.

=== The term "nine angles" ===
Although occult scholars attribute the concept of Nine Angles to the Church of Satan, in its essays and other writings the ONA offers differing explanations as to the meaning of the term "Nine Angles". One explanation is that it pertains to the seven planets of the group's cosmology (the seven angles), added to the system as a whole (the eighth angle), and the mystic themselves (the ninth angle). A second explanation is that it refers to seven "normal" alchemical stages, with an additional two processes. A third is that it pertains to the nine emanations of the divine, a concept originally found in Medieval texts produced within the Islamic mystical tradition of Sufism. Monette further suggested that it was a reference to a classical Indian tradition which divided the Solar System into nine planets.

== Practices ==
The ONA presents itself as an elitist group with highly demanding membership requirements. The Order advocates an arduous individual achievement of self-mastery and Nietzschean self-overcoming, with an emphasis on individual growth through practical acts of risk, prowess and endurance. Therefore, "[t]he goal of the Satanism of the ONA is to create a new individual through direct experience, practice and self-development [with] the grades of the ONA system being highly individual, based on the initiates' own practical and real-life acts, instead of merely performing certain ceremonial rituals". Thus Satanism, the ONA assert, requires venturing into the realm of the forbidden and illegal in order to shake the practitioner loose of cultural and political conditioning. Intentionally transgressive, the Order has been characterised as providing "an aggressive and elitist spirituality".

=== Initiation and the Seven Fold Way ===
The ONA's core system is known as the "Seven Fold Way" or "Hebdomadry", and is outlined in one of the Order's primary texts, Naos. The sevenfold system is reflected in the group's symbolic cosmology, the "Tree of Wyrd", on which seven celestial bodies – the Moon, Venus, Mercury, the Sun, Mars, Jupiter, and Saturn – are located. The term wyrd was adopted from Old English, where it referred to fate or destiny. Monette identified this as a "hermetic system", highlighting that the use of seven planetary bodies had been influenced by the Medieval Arabic texts Ghāyat al-Ḥakīm and Shams al-Ma'arif.

Senholt argues that the ONA incorporation of "Tree of Wyrd" concept to the "seven fold ways" system were a conscious attempt to differentiate their own teaching from the concept of tree of life in Kabbalah mysticism, as they consider the tree of life to be an Abrahamic Semitic concept. The Seven Fold Way is reflected in the group's initiatory system, which has seven grades through which the member can gradually progress. These are: (1) Neophyte, (2) Initiate, (3) External Adept, (4) Internal Adept, (5) Master/Mistress, (6) Grand Master/Mousa and (7) Immortal. The group has revealed that very few of its members raise to the fifth and sixth degrees. In a 1989 article, the ONA stated that at that point there were only four individuals who had reached the stage of Master.

The ONA does not initiate members into the group itself, but rather expects individuals to initiate themselves. It requires that initiates be in a good physical condition, and recommends a training regimen for prospective members to follow. Newcomers are expected to take on a magical partner of the opposite sex. The practitioner must undertake personal and increasingly difficult challenges in order to move through the different grades. Most of the ordeals that allow the initiate to proceed to the next stage are publicly revealed by the Order in its introductory material, as it is believed that the true initiatory element lies in the experience itself and can only be attained through performing them.

Part of the ritual to become an External Adept involves an ordeal in which the prospective member is to find a lonely spot and to lie there, still, for an entire night without moving or sleeping. The initiatory process for the role of Internal Adept entails the practitioner withdrawing from human society for three months, from an equinox to a solstice, or more usually for six months, during which time they must live in the wild without modern conveniences or contact with civilisation. According to Jeffrey Kaplan, an academic specialist of the far-right, these physically and mentally challenging initiatory tasks reflect "the ONA's conception of itself as a vanguard organization composed of a tiny coterie of Nietzschean elites."

=== Insight roles ===
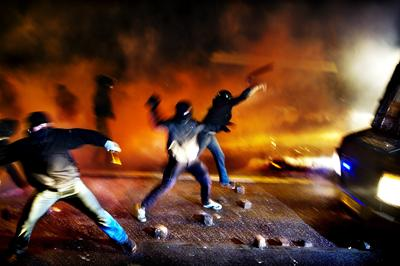
The ONA encourages its members to adopt "insight roles" in anarchist, neo-Nazi, and Islamist groups in order to disrupt modern Western society.

An important aspect of ONA practice are the adoption of "insight roles", by which practitioners must adopt a lifestyle radically different to their own. Via experience and adversity, it is believed that these insight roles contribute to the practitioner's evolutionary superiority and thus assists the coming of the new aeon.

These "insight roles" often involve working undercover among a politically extreme group for a period of six to eighteen months, gaining experience in something different from their normal life. Among the ideological trends that the ONA suggests its members adopt "insight roles" within are anarchism, neo-Nazism, and Islamism, stating that aside from the personal benefits of such an involvement, membership of these groups has the benefit of undermining the Magian-Nazarene socio-political system of the West and thus helping to bring about the instability from which a new order, the Imperium, can emerge. Monette noted a potential shift in the insight roles recommended by the group over the decades. The ONA recommended criminal or military activities during the 1980s and early 1990s. By the late 1990s and 2000s, they were instead recommending Buddhist monasticism as an insight role for practitioners to adopt.

Through the practice of "insight roles", the order advocates continuous transgression of established norms, roles, and comfort zones in the development of the initiate. This extreme application of ideas further amplifies the ambiguity of Satanic and left-hand path practices of antinomianism, making it almost impossible to penetrate the layers of subversion, play and counter-dichotomy inherent in the sinister dialectics." Senholt suggested that Myatt's involvement with both neo-Nazism and Islamism represent such "insight roles" in his own life.

=== Magick ===
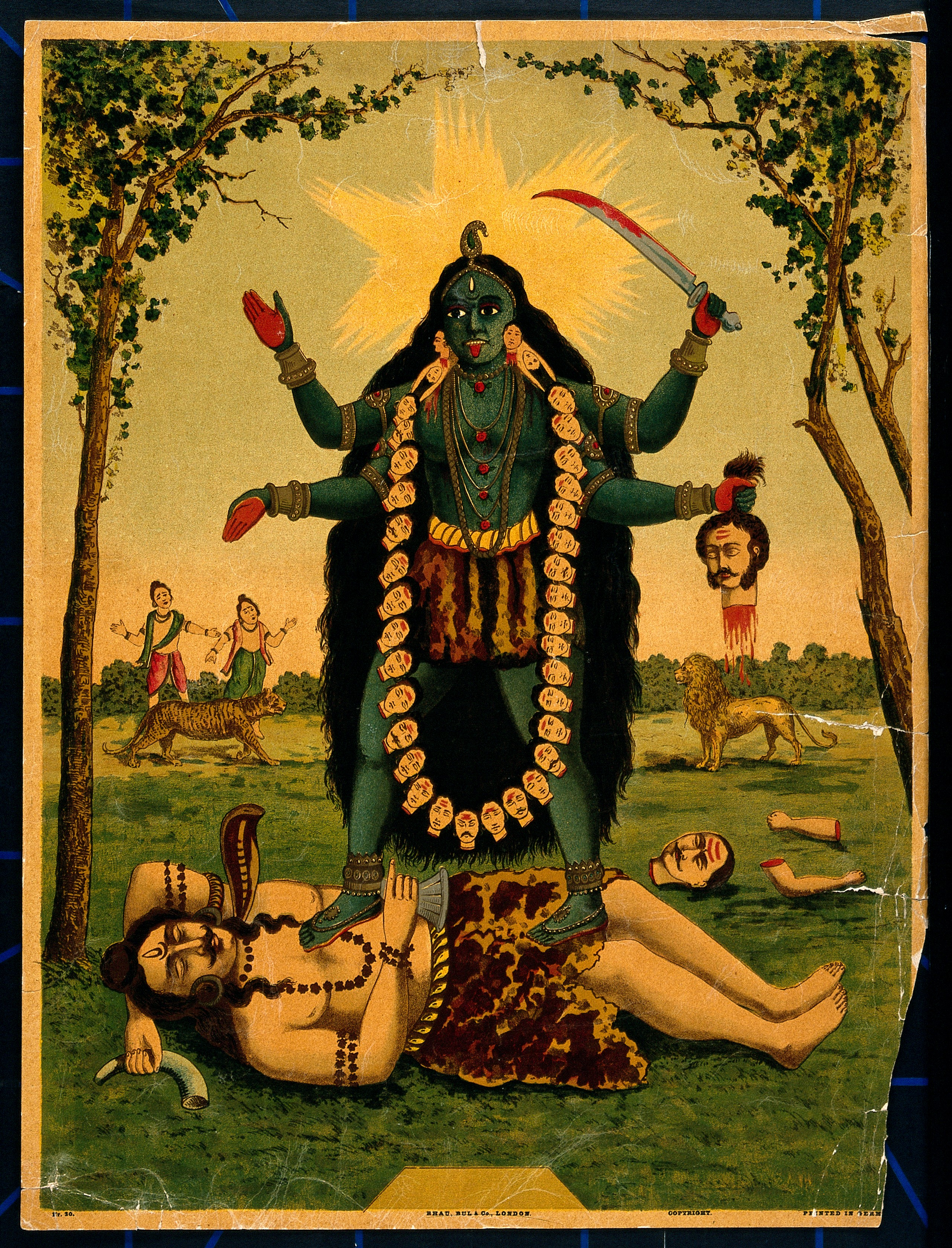
The ONA's dark goddess has been described as having "strong parallels" with the Hindu goddess Kali (pictured).

The ONA distinguish between external, internal, and aeonic magick. External magic itself is divided into two categories: ceremonial magick, which is performed by more than two people to achieve a specific goal and hermetic magick, which is performed either solitarily or in a pair and which is often sexual in nature.

Internal magick is designed to produce an altered state of consciousness in the participant, in order to result in a process of "individuation" which bestows adepthood. The most advanced form of magick in the ONA system is aeonic magick, the practice of which is restricted to those who are already perceived to have mastered external and internal magick, and attained the grade of master. The purpose of aeonic magick is to influence large numbers of people over a lengthy period of time, thus affecting the development of future aeons. In particular it is employed with the intent of disrupting the current socio-political system of the Western world, which the ONA believe has been corrupted by Judeo-Christian religion.

The ONA utilises two methods in its performance of aeonic magick. The first entails rites and chants with the intent of opening a gateway – known as a "nexion" – to the "acausal realm" in order to manifest energies in the "causal realm" that will influence the existing aeon in the practitioner's desired direction. The second method involves playing an advanced form of a board game known as the Star Game; the game was devised by the group, with the game pieces representing different aeons. The group believes that when an initiate plays the game they can become a "living nexion" and thus a channel for acausal energies to enter the causal realm and effect aeonic change. An advanced form of the game is used as part of the training for the grade of Internal Adept.

=== Human sacrifice ===
The ONA's writings encourage human sacrifice, referring to their victims as opfers. The group outlined guidelines for human sacrifice in several documents: "A Gift for the Prince – A Guide to Human Sacrifice", "Culling – A Guide to Sacrifice II", "Victims – A Sinister Exposé", and "Guidelines for the Testing of Opfers". According to the ONA, the killer must allow their victims to "self-select" themselves. This is achieved by testing victims to see whether they expose perceived character faults. If they do, it is believed that victims to have shown that they are worthy of death, and the sacrifice can commence.

Those deemed ideal for sacrifice include individuals perceived as being of low character, members of what they deem "sham-Satanic groups" like the Church of Satan and Temple of Set, as well as "zealous, interfering Nazarenes", and journalists, business figures and political activists who disrupt the group's operations. The ONA explains that, because of the need for such "self-selection", children must never be victims of sacrifice.

The sacrifice is carried out through either physical or magical means, at which point the killer is believed to absorb power from the body and spirit of the victim, thus entering a new level of "sinister" consciousness. As well as strengthening the killer's character by heightening their connection with the acausal forces of death and destruction, such sacrifices are also viewed as having wider benefits by the ONA, because they remove from society individuals the group deems worthless. Monette noted that no ONA nexion cells publicly admitted to carrying out a sacrifice in a ritual manner, but that members had joined police and military groups to engage in legal violence and killing.

The ONA believe that there are historical precedents to their practice of human sacrifice, expressing belief in a prehistoric tradition in which humans were sacrificed to a goddess named Baphomet at the spring equinox and to the Arcturus star in the autumn. The ONA's advocacy of human sacrifice has drawn strong criticism from other Satanist groups like the Temple of Set, who deem it to be detrimental to their own attempts to make Satanism more socially acceptable.

=== Sexual violence ===
The Counter Extremism Project reported that one ONA publication was titled The Rape Anthology and called for followers to seek "spiritual arousal from violent sexual rape". White Star Acception have published material in which they present rape as a regular practice of the group.

In 1998, Searchlight magazine accused the ONA of being affiliated with paedophiles. According to a BBC News article from 2020, "The authorities are concerned by the number of paedophiles associated with the ONA, taking the group into a different area of law enforcement activity." The Global Network on Extremism and Technology have also reported that the ONA is "adjacent" to the 764 network, which has adopted the ONA's "visual aesthetics" and been associated with widespread child sexual abuse.

== Membership ==
Academic observers have argued that in the 1980s and 1990s the ONA remained very small. Gregorius suggested that in the 1980s its membership may only have included one or two people, while in his 1995 overview of British Satanist groups, Harvey suggested that the ONA consisted of less than ten members, "and perhaps fewer than five." In 1998, Jeffrey Kaplan and Leonard Weinberg stated that the ONA's membership was "infinitesmally small", with the group acting primarily as a "mail-order ministry". The following year, Christos Beest stated that there were only about ten people involved.

In 2013, Senholt observed that because the group has no official membership, it is "difficult, if not impossible, to estimate the number of ONA members". Senholt suggested that a "rough estimate" of the "total number" of individuals involved with the ONA in some capacity from 1980 to 2009 was "a few thousand"; he had come to this conclusion from an examination of the number of magazines and journals about the subject circulated and the number of members of online discussion groups devoted to the ONA. At the same time he thought that the number of "longtime adherents is much smaller." In 2013, Monette estimated that there were over two thousand ONA associates, broadly defined. He believed that the gender balance was roughly equal, although with regional variation and differences among particular nexions. Introvigne observed that if Monette's estimate was correct, it would mean that the ONA is "easily... the largest Satanist organization in the world".

A 2015 survey of Satanists run by the scholars Asbjørn Dyrendal, James R. Lewis, and Jesper Aa. Petersen found that those expressing a positive view of the ONA tended to be "a little older" than other Satanists, were more likely to have children, and were politically further to the right. It also determined that there were a higher proportion of women sympathetic to the ONA than among Satanists more broadly.

== Legacy and influence ==
According to American civil rights group the Southern Poverty Law Center, the ONA "holds an important position in the niche, international nexus of occult, esoteric, and/or satanic neo-Nazi groups."

The ONA's main influence lies not with the group itself, but with its prolific release of written material; as Gregorius noted, "the ONA has primarily had an impact through disseminating and popularising its distinct ideas and concepts". According to Senholt, "the ONA has produced more material on both the practical and theoretical aspects of magic, as well as more ideological texts on Satanism and the left-hand path in general, than larger groups such as the Church of Satan and the Temple of Set has produced in combination [which] makes the ONA an important player in the theoretical discussion of what the left-hand path and Satanism is and should be according to the practitioners".

These writings were initially distributed to other Satanist and neo-Nazi groups, although with the development of the Internet this was also used as a medium to propagate its writings, with Monette stating that they had attained "a sizable presence in occult cyberspace", and thus become "one of the most prominent Left Hand Path groups by virtue of its public presence". Many of these writings were then reproduced by other groups. Kaplan considered the ONA to be "an important source of Satanic ideology/theology" for "the occultist fringe of National Socialism", namely neo-Nazi groups like the Black Order.

The ONA gained increased attention following the growth in public interest in Myatt's impact on terrorist groups during the war on terror in the 2000s. In 2007, the historian of esotericism Dave Evans stated that the ONA were "worthy of an entire PhD thesis". Senholt stated that it would be "potentially dangerous to ignore these fanatics, however limited their numbers might be".

=== In music and literature ===
Bands that have featured ONA ideology and symbolism in their albums include Hvile I Kaos (until 2018), Altar of Perversion, Aosoth and Spear of Longinus.

The Quietus published a series of articles during 2018 exploring the connections between far-right politics, music and the ONA. The ONA has also influenced literature, with Stephen Leather's Jack Nightingale novels featuring them as the main antagonists.

== See also ==
- Dark Lily
- James H. Madole, neo-Nazi and political leader
- Pekka Siitoin, neo-Nazi and Satanist
- Right-wing terrorism
- Terrorgram
