= White Wolves =

British neo-Nazi terrorist organisation

The White Wolves was a British neo-Nazi and white supremacist terrorist organisation that claimed to adhere to the doctrine of leaderless resistance, which claimed responsibility for several racially motivated bombings in London in 1999.

"The White Wolves was a tiny secretive group of Nazi fanatics organised in cells. It first came to attention in 1994 when it issued a 'blueprint for terror'. Copying the concept of "leaderless resistance" from American far-right extremists, they formed small cells and planned terror bombings and cold- blooded murder." The anonymous 15 page 1994 blueprint for terror – which announced the formation of the White Wolves, contained practical instructions on bomb making, and which called for a race war – has been widely attributed to the then neo-Nazi ideologue David Myatt.

Mike Whine, head of the Board of Jewish Deputies theorised that the White Wolves were a splinter group of Combat 18, deriving their name from a Serbian paramilitary formation.

== London bombs ==
Around the time of the Brixton nail-bomb, 25 people received stenciled notes stating:

Notice is hereby given that all non-whites (defined by blood, not religion) must permanently leave the British Isles before the year is out. Jews & other non-whites who remain after 1999 has ended will be exterminated. When the clocks strike midnight on 31 December 1999 the White Wolves will begin to howl and when the Wolves begin to howl the Wolves begin to hunt. You have been warned. Hail Britannia.

At the time of the bombings, police authorities believed that former Combat 18 second-in-command Del O'Connor was the likely head of the White Wolves. A stencilled message had been circulated reading C18 did not carry out the Brixton bombing. We, the White Wolves, did.

== Arrest ==
In May 1999, a 22-year-old, David Copeland, was arrested and charged with all three nail-bombings. Copeland was convicted and sentenced to six life sentences, and a judge ruled in 2007 that he could not be released until 2049 at the earliest.
