= Phineas Priesthood =

American white supremacist ideology

The Phineas Priesthood, also called Phineas Priests, are American white supremacists who adhere to the ideology set forth in the 1990 book Vigilantes of Christendom: The Story of the Phineas Priesthood by Richard Kelly Hoskins. The book traces what Hoskins claims is the history of the "Phineas Priesthood", which he claims has been a real force throughout history.

The Phineas Priests are not an organization, and it has no discernible leadership or institutional structure. For ideological adherents, a "Phineas Priest" is someone who commits a "Phineas action" – meaning the person follows the example of Phineas, a Israelite man who was rewarded by God for killing an interfaith “mamzer” couple, according to the Old Testament. The term "Phineas action" is broadly used by white supremacists, as a term for murders of interracial couples and as a term for attacks on Jews, members of other non-white ethnic groups, "multiculturalists," and anyone else who they consider their enemy.

== Name ==
The Phineas Priesthood is named after the Israelite Phineas, grandson of Aaron (Numbers 25:7). According to Numbers 25, Phineas personally executed an Israelite man and a Midianite woman while they were together in the man's tent, ending a plague which had been sent by God in order to punish the Israelites for intermingling both sexually and religiously with Baal-worshipers. Phineas is commended for having stopped Israel's fall into idolatrous practices that were introduced to it by Moabite women. God commends Phineas as zealous through Moses, gives him a "covenant of peace," and grants him and "his seed" an everlasting priesthood. This passage was cited in Hoskins's book as a justification for using violent means against people who have interracial relationships and practice other forms of alleged immorality.

== Ideology ==
The ideology in Hoskins's book includes Christian Identity beliefs which oppose interracial relationships, the mixing of races, homosexuality, and abortion. It is marked by anti-Semitism and anti-multiculturalism.

The Phineas Priesthood is not considered an organization because it is not led by a governing body, its members do not hold gatherings, and it does not have a membership process. One becomes a Phineas Priest by adopting the Priesthood's beliefs and acting on them. Adherents of the Phineas Priesthood ideology are considered terrorists.

According to the Anti-Defamation League (ADL), "Many people mistakenly believe that there is an actual organization called the Phineas Priesthood, probably because there was a group of four men in the 1990s who called themselves Phineas Priests. The men carried out bank robberies and a series of bombings in the Pacific Northwest before being sent to prison. But there is no evidence that their organization was any larger than those four individuals."

In 2012, Drew Bostwick renamed a splinter faction of the neo-Nazi group Aryan Nations the "Tabernacle of the Phineas Priesthood-Aryan Nations" when he replaced August Kreis as the group's leader.

== Activities ==
After Hoskins wrote about the concept, several white supremacists, who had committed their crimes before he had written the book, retroactively claimed it as justification for their crimes or that they were members of the Priesthood when they committed the crimes.

Phineas priest crimes include numerous abortion clinic bombings in 1996, the 1996 bombing of The Spokesman-Review newspaper in Spokane, Washington, bank robberies in Washington state, the bombing of a Planned Parenthood clinic, and plans to blow up FBI buildings. Three men – Charles H. Barbee, Robert S. Berry and Verne Jay Merrell – who professed to follow the "religious philosophy of Phineas priests" were convicted of crimes that included bank robberies and bombings, and each of them was sentenced to life in prison in 1997 and 1998. The offenses in which the three were convicted of were conspiracy, transportation of stolen vehicles across state lines and possessing hand grenades. A fourth man, Brian Ratigan, was also convicted for his role in the planned parenthood bombing. He was released from prison in June 2020, 24 years early than what his original sentence was. In January 2021, Charles Barbee was resentenced to 55 years in prison. U.S. District Court Judge William Fremming Nielsen, who handed down Barbee's new sentence, had previously modified the sentences of his co defendants, Robert Berry and Verne Merrell. In December 2022, Barbee and Merrell's sentenced were further reduced by Judge Nielsen to 40 and 43 years respectively. Merrell had first been resentenced in 2020, but was cut down by 15 years as a result of the 2022 decision.

In the early 2000s, Joshua Caleb Sutter and August Kreis advocated the Phineas Priesthood, and compared this to a white supremacist version of Islamist attacks. Sutter declared himself a Phineas Priest.

Walter Thody was given a life sentence in 1992 for a series of bank robberies in California. He alleged the stolen money was used to fund his Phineas Priesthood cell's mission to assassinate Jews.

A copy of Hoskins's book, War Cycles, Peace Cycles, was found in a van that was driven by Buford Furrow when he killed one person and wounded five others in an attack on a Jewish Community Center in California in 1999. Although that book is about economics, Michael Reynolds of the Southern Poverty Law Center noted that Furrow's actions were consistent with the Phineas Priesthood as described by Hoskins in Vigilantes of Christendom.

On November 28, 2014, 49-year-old Larry Steven McQuilliams fired more than 100 rounds at a federal courthouse, a Mexican consulate building, which he also tried to set on fire, and a police station in Austin, Texas before being killed by return fire from police. A copy of Hoskins's book was found in McQuilliams's home.

== See also ==
- Antisemitism in Christianity
- Christian terrorism
- Byron De La Beckwith – the assassin of NAACP and Civil rights movement leader Medgar Evers – who became a Phineas Priest
- Larry Gene Ashbrook, a mass murderer who allegedly was a self-professed Phineas Priest
- Groups claiming affiliation with Israelites
- List of white nationalist organizations
