= Nail Bomber: Manhunt =

2021 British true crime documentary film

- Poster
- Directed by: Daniel Vernon
- Production company: Expectation
- Distributed by: Netflix
- Release date: 26 May 2021
- Running time: 72 minutes
- Country: United Kingdom
- Language: English

Nail Bomber: Manhunt is a 2021 Netflix Original true crime documentary film about the 1999 London nail bombings.

== Production and distribution ==
Nail Bomber: Manhunt was commissioned by Netflix from Expectation, a United Kingdom-based production company, in August 2020 under the title The Nailbomber. The film was directed by Daniel Vernon. Sonny Sheridan colour graded the film.

The film was released on Netflix on 26 May 2021.

== Reception ==
Brad Newsome of The Sydney Morning Herald called the film an "unusual and compelling documentary", noting the films focus on the people affected by the attack.
