= The Lampshade =

2010 nonfiction book

The Lampshade: A Holocaust Detective Story from Buchenwald to New Orleans
- Author: Mark Jacobson
- Language: English
- Subject: Holocaust, Hurricane Katrina
- Genre: Nonfiction, Detective stories
- Publisher: Simon & Schuster
- Publication date: September 2010
- Publication place: United States
- Media type: Print and ebook
- Pages: 357 (U.S. hardback)
- ISBN: 978-1-4165-6627-4
- Dewey Decimal: 940.5318
- LC Class: D804.7.M67 J33 2010

The Lampshade: A Holocaust Detective Story from Buchenwald to New Orleans is a 2010 nonfiction book by U.S. author Mark Jacobson. It recounts the attempt to ascertain the origin of a lampshade purportedly made from human skin. It was not until 2012 that DNA testing was sophisticated enough to determine that the shade was likely made from a parchment of cow skin.

== Synopsis ==
In the aftermath of Hurricane Katrina in 2005, a lampshade purported to be made from the skin of a Jewish Holocaust victim, turned up in a sidewalk rummage sale in New Orleans. It was purchased for $35 by Skip Henderson, a local New Orleans man just returned to the City from Katrina evacuation. Henderson subsequently sent the lampshade to his friend Mark Jacobson, thinking that the Brooklyn writer would be interested in searching into the history of the object. Jacobson then embarks on a 5 year quest to discover the true origin of the lampshade. Genetic testing initially confirmed it was made from human skin. But because of the tanning process, researchers were unable to determine the ethnic origin of the person whose skin was used, nor to date it.

Over the course of the next few years, Jacobson attempts to track down the origin of and explore the meaning of the lampshade, how it ended up in New Orleans, and to decide what to do with it. Both the United States Holocaust Memorial Museum in Washington, D.C., and the Yad Vashem museum in Jerusalem, declined to take possession of the lampshade, saying that accounts of concentration camp lampshades made of human skin were probably a "myth". Through his investigation, Jacobson examines the history of the Buchenwald concentration camp, where such objects were reputed to have been made; as well as the racial and post-Katrina history of New Orleans, the world of Holocaust deniers, the mythology surrounding objects said to be made from human skin, and the black market trafficking of such goods.

== Cow skin ==
In 2012 the lampshade was subjected to more sophisticated, next-generation DNA testing. It was determined to most likely be cow skin, or parchment. Prepared skins, known as parchment, were used for writing materials in ancient and medieval times.
