= David Myatt =

British writer and religious leader (born 1950)

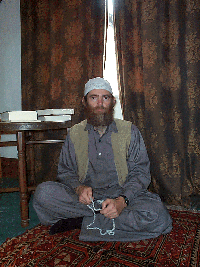
- Myatt in 2002 after his conversion to Islam, wearing a thawb and a taqiyah
- Born: David Wulstan Myatt; 1950 (age 75–76)
- Other names: Wulstan Tedder, Godric Redbeard, Abdul-Aziz ibn Myatt, Abdul al-Qari
- Citizenship: British
- Occupations: Author, religious leader, and British far-right and Islamist militant
- Years active: 1968–present: 1968–1998 (Neo-Nazism); 1974–? (Order of Nine Angles); 1998–2009 (Islam); 2010–present (Numinous Way)
- Known for: Likely identity of Anton Long
- Movement: Neo-Nazism, Jihadism

David Wulstan Myatt (born 1950), also known by various pseudonyms, including Wulstan Tedder, Godric Redbeard, Abdul al-Qari, and Abdul-Aziz ibn Myatt, is a British writer, religious leader, far-right and former Islamist militant, most notable for being considered the likely identity of Anton Long, the political and religious leader of the theistic Satanist and neo-Nazi organization the Order of Nine Angles (ONA) from 1974 onwards.

Raised in Tanganyika, Myatt became a neo-Nazi while in secondary school. He was a member of Colin Jordan's British Movement from the late 1960s to 1974, when he founded a schism with Eddy Morrison, the National Democratic Freedom Movement. He founded or led various neo-Nazi groups from the 1970s to 1990s, including Combat 18, Reichsfolk, and the National Socialist Movement, until 1998, when he converted to Islam. In 2010 he declared he had rejected both Islam and all extremism.

== Early life ==
David Wulstan Myatt (Note: Some accounts give Myatt's middle name as William, such as Black Sun by Nicholas Goodrick-Clarke. George Michael in The Enemy of My Enemy and Jeffrey Kaplan in the Encyclopedia of White Power give it as Wulstan.) was born in 1950. (Note: Sometimes given as 1952. According to Jacob C. Senholt, 1950 is more likely.) He grew up in Tanganyika, now part of Tanzania, where his father worked as a civil servant for the British government. He later lived in the Far East, where he studied martial arts. He attended a British preparatory school. He learned Ancient Greek and Sanskrit, as well as logic, astronomy and philosophy topics, which would shape his adult interests. Myatt returned to England with his father in 1967.

== Career ==
=== Neo-Nazism ===
In 1968 or 1969, while in secondary school, Myatt met members of Colin Jordan's British Movement, a neo-Nazi group. He joined the group and became a fanatical supporter of Jordan, sometimes acting as Jordan's bodyguard at meetings and rallies. Myatt later became the Leeds Branch Secretary and a member of British Movement's National Council.

In 1970, he enrolled in Hull University, where he studied physics, interested in other dimensions and space travel. He did not graduate as he spent most of his time on political activism and found his studies boring, dropping out of the course. At the same time, he began to be interested in occultism. Jordan introduced him to the book The Lightning and the Sun by Savitri Devi, which lays out an occultist Nazi view of history; Myatt was heavily influenced by the book. In 1974, he formed a schism from the British Movement, the National Democratic Freedom Movement (NDFM), with Eddy Morrison; it was a neo-Nazi organization active in Leeds, England. Myatt created propaganda and spoke publicly about his views. The NDFM was involved in several attacks on left-wing activists and non-white peoples. He was imprisoned twice for violent offences in connection with his political activism.

He created several journals throughout the years, including Das Reich, Future Reich, and The National Socialist. Due to his neo-Nazi activism, he was engaged in frequent disputes with the antifascist Searchlight magazine. Myatt used various pseudonyms throughout his career in neo-Nazism. He at times went by the name Wulstan Tedder, another pseudonym, which was attached to an elaborate aristocratic persona. Myatt maintained that Tedder was a different person for some time before admitting it was him in the 2000s. He also used the pseudonym Godric Redbeard. According to Jeffrey Kaplan, Myatt undertook "a global odyssey which took him on extended stays in the Middle East and East Asia, accompanied by studies of religions ranging from Christianity to Islam in the Western tradition and Taoism and Buddhism in the Eastern path."

=== Occultism ===
Myatt was, in the early 1970s, the leader of the Temple of the Sun, a satanist group in Leeds. He was interviewed about the Temple in March 1974 in the Leeds Evening Post. In the interview, he spoke about his beliefs, saying:

All this shout about the film The Exorcist finally decided me to bring my own position, at least, into the open. We live at the beginning of the age of Satan where people will be free from the tyranny of Christianity and where Satanists will be as masters and all others slaves. The magic we possess is the magic of the mind, the power to bend minds. The more chaos and upset we cause in the world, the more we can rise above it as Satanists and strengthen our power over the masses. We are not a religion. There is no God by man. Now the new aeon is here its leader will be the Lord 666 (The Beast).

In this interview, he noted that an animal would have to be sacrificed for a ritual. The antifascist Searchlight magazine would for some time preface all mentions of him with the epithet "cat strangler" due to alleged killings of cats as parts of occult rituals. He denies that he ever did this.

At some point, the Temple of the Sun was merged into another Satanist-Wiccan group, which may have been the Order of Nine Angles (ONA/O9A). Myatt is widely believed to have either been the founder of the ONA or to have taken it over after its original leader left, whereupon he reshaped the group in line with his own beliefs, writing the publicly available teachings of the ONA under the pseudonym Anton Long. Senholt called Myatt's role "paramount to the whole creation and existence of the ONA".

The ONA has an elaborate mythology and its actual origins are confused. It may have been a preexisting pagan group before Myatt's involvement; in 1974, it became a theistic Satanist organization once the leadership was allegedly taken over by Myatt. The Order of Nine Angles identify as theistic Satanists and affirm to practice "traditional Satanism". Sociologist of religion Massimo Introvigne defined it as "a synthesis of three different currents: hermetic, pagan, and Satanist". According to the scholar of Western esotericism Nicholas Goodrick-Clarke, "the ONA celebrated the dark, destructive side of life through anti-Christian, elitist, and Social Darwinist doctrines", together with the organization's implicit ties to neo-Nazism and the appraisal of National Socialism. He was a friend and close associate of Victor Morris, a fellow British neo-Nazi Satanist who established the magazine Dark Lily in the late 1970s.

Myatt has, for decades, denied that he had any involvement with the ONA and that he is Anton Long. In a 1998 article, Jeffrey Kaplan suggested that Myatt and Long were probably separate people, though in an article in 2000 notes that he cooperated closely with the ONA and that it was a "widespread belief" they were one and the same. In 2016, Massimo Introvigne noted that despite the ONA's past denials about Myatt being Long, they had since "more or less acknowledged that 'Anton Long' was a 'nom de plume' of Myatt" in the face of new evidence from, among others, Jacob C. Senholt. Among others, scholars Massimo Introvigne, Nicholas Goodrick-Clarke, Clive Henry, Jacob C. Senholt, and Andrew G. Palella all agree that Myatt is Anton Long. Senholt noted that works that, in their original form, were identified as being written by Myatt were later repurposed by the ONA under other pseudonyms, that an autobiography of Long's life bore a great similarity to events from Myatt's, and that the ONA used Myatt's unique date system.

Senholt described a 2003 comment by Myatt as "probably the closest one can get to an admission of starting the ONA", which said:

Remembering my Occult studies of years ago, I conceived a plan to use or if necessary create secret Occult-type groups with several aims. These groups would be allied to and aid a real covert organization dedicated to the overthrow of the System. One of the aims of these Occult-style groups was to infiltrate people into various positions in society where they could aid our Cause; another was to subvert people in influential positions by drawing them into these secret groups and then gradually converting them to the Cause. Another was to try and establish international links and spread the idea of a world-wide revolution and world-wide National- Socialist renaissance. The final aim was to attract people to these groups and gain information from them, using one obvious means which various other intelligence groups had used over the centuries to gain useful information […] In pursuit of these covert aims I infiltrated several already existing Occult-type groups and created a new one.

In the early 1980s Myatt tried to establish a Nazi-occultist commune in Shropshire. The project was advertised in Colin Jordan's Gothic Ripples newsletter, with Goodrick-Clark writing that "after marrying and settling in Church Stretton in Shropshire, [Myatt] attempted in 1983 to set up a rural commune within the framework of Colin Jordan's Vanguard Project for neo-Nazi utopias publicized in Gothic Ripples". In a 1984 article in the American neo-Nazi magazine Liberty Bell, "Vindex: The Destiny of the West", Myatt presents an esoteric neo-Nazi view of history, arguing that through "Aeonics", neo-Nazi Satanists can channel "sinister" energies to overcome the "Nazarene" era.

=== Paramilitary neo-Nazi activity ===
Myatt reappeared on the neo-Nazi scene in the early 1990s, becoming involved with paramilitary and neo-Nazi organisations such as Column 88 and Combat 18. Myatt was the founder and first leader of the National Socialist Movement in the late 1990s. According to the BBC's Panorama, in 1998 when Myatt was leader of the NSM, he called for "the creation of racial terror with bombs". He was identified by The Observer, as the "ideological heavyweight" behind Combat 18. Michael writes that Myatt took over the leadership of Combat 18 in 1998, when Charlie Sargent, the previous leader, was jailed for murder. Under his Tedder pseudonym, he wrote several articles for the neo-Nazi magazines Liberty Bell and Spearhead in this period.

Myatt founded the neo-Nazi Reichsfolk group in 1996. The Reichsfolk organization "aimed to create a new Aryan elite, The Legion of Adolf Hitler, and so prepare the way for a golden age in place of 'the disgusting, decadent present with its dishonourable values and dis-honourable weak individuals'". It promoted what Myatt called "Ethical National-Socialism", a supposedly non-racist and Darwinist system.

In November 1997, Myatt posted a racist and anti-Semitic pamphlet he had written called Practical Guide to Aryan Revolution on a website based in British Columbia, Canada by Bernard Klatt. The pamphlet included chapter titles such as "Assassination", "Terror Bombing", and "Racial War". According to Michael Whine of the Board of Deputies of British Jews, "[t]he contents provided a detailed step-by-step guide for terrorist insurrection with advice on assassination targets, rationale for bombing and sabotage campaigns, and rules of engagement."

In February 1998, detectives from S012 Scotland Yard raided Myatt's home in Worcestershire and removed his computers and files. He was arrested on suspicion of incitement to murder and incitement to racial hatred. The case later dropped, after a three-year investigation, because the evidence supplied by the Canadian authorities was not enough to secure a conviction. The same year, Searchlight magazine released an expose of Myatt which claimed he was Anton Long, the first time this had been made public. They issued an article declaring him "the most dangerous Nazi in Britain". Other neo-Nazis affiliated with Myatt's non-occult endeavors took the reveal of Myatt as Long badly, and it caused disorder within the movements affiliated with him.

=== Conversion to Islam ===
In 1998, Myatt converted to radical Islam, while continuing to lead the ONA. He told Professor George Michael that his decision to convert began when he took a job on a farm in England. He was working long hours in the fields and felt an affinity with nature, concluding that the sense of harmony he felt had not come about by chance. He told Michael that he was impressed by the militancy of Islamist groups, and believed that he shared common enemies with Islam, namely "the capitalist-consumer West and international finance."

Myatt came to public attention in 1999, a year after his Islamic conversion, when A Practical Guide to Aryan Revolution was said to have inspired David Copeland, who left nailbombs in areas frequented by London's black, South Asian, and gay communities. A copy of the Practical Guide to Aryan Revolution pamphlet was discovered by police in the flat of David Copeland; Copeland was also a member of Myatt's NSM. Three people died and 129 were injured in the explosions, several of them losing limbs. It has also been suggested that Myatt's A Practical Guide to Aryan Revolution might have influenced the German National Socialist Underground.

As a Muslim, he travelled and spoke in several Arab countries, and wrote one of the most detailed defences in the English language of Islamic suicide attacks. He expressed support for the Taliban, Osama bin Laden, and referred to the Holocaust as a "hoax". While operating as a radical Islamist, he used the names Abdul-Aziz ibn Myatt and Abdul al-Qari. While advocating radical Islam, he was still in contact with many of his neo-Nazi associates, and maintained many of the same basic beliefs. He advocated for alliances between neo-Nazis and Islamists throughout the 2000s, seeing them as part of the same struggle and inspired by historical examples of collaboration between Nazis and Muslims.

Myatt's attempts to broker Nazi-Islamist alliances mostly did not work; many Muslims saw his conversion as illegitimate, while neo-Nazis largely condemned him as a traitor to the cause. However, the Aryan Nations, a Christian Identity group, promoted Myatt's ideas with their "Ministry of Islamic Relations". In 2005, Joshua Caleb Sutter, under the pseudonym Wulfran Hall, a fellow esoteric neo-Nazi and radical Islam sympathizer, interviewed Myatt in the ONA's journal Fenrir. In the media, his conversion was generally believed to be legitimate and not questioned, though his political opponents, particularly the anti-fascist Searchlight organization, suggested that Myatt's conversion "may be just a political ploy to advance his own failing anti-establishment agenda". Jacob C. Senholt argued that his turn to Islam was yet another manifestation of his Satanic neo-Nazi ideology and the beliefs of his Order of Nine Angles, particularly "insight roles".

He eventually came to be accepted by radical Muslims. One of Myatt's writings justifying suicide attacks, "Are Martyrdom Operations Lawful (According to Quran and Sunnah)?" was, for several years, on the Izz ad-Din al-Qassam Brigades (the military wing) section of the Hamas website. The Islamist organization The Saved Sect also featured him on their website. He wrote on various Islamist web forums, including Islamic Awakening and Islam Online, where Muslims defended him. He was invited to speak at mosques in England and, in one case, was interviewed by an Arabic television station.

=== Claimed abandonment of extremism ===
By the mid 2000s, Myatt had recommitted to neo-Nazism, though maintained attachment to Islam. In 2007, he began to dissociate from it and removed Islamic material from his websites; his output of new Islamic material on his website slowed, while material from "Anton Long" about ONA ideology increased in output. He publicly renounced Islam in 2009 and returned to neo-Nazism. According to his autobiography, following several personal issues, including two divorces, his fiancee, Fran, dying by suicide in 2006, and losing a loved one to cancer, he began to reevaluate his life. Myatt publicly announced in 2010 that he had rejected both Islam and all forms of extremism. He has since developed a mystical philosophy which he calls The Numinous Way. He wrote an autobiography in 2013.

Despite this renunciation of extremism, it was alleged that Myatt attended the far-right "Pact of Steel III" conference in December 2018; this allegation is unconfirmed. Scholar Andre G. Palella argued that it was "plausible that his 2013 renunciation of extremism is likely another disingenuous 'sinister trick,' part of ONA’s 'Sinister Game' that advises 'not trust what people say about their experiences, their 'achievements,' and themselves.'" As of 2024, Myatt continues to run a blog.

== Beliefs and influence ==
Myatt's writings have been widely spread by neo-Nazis. According to scholar Jacob C. Senholt, "ONA-inspired activities, led by protagonist David Myatt, managed to enter the scene of grand politics and the global 'War On Terror', because of several foiled terror plots in Europe that can be linked to Myatt's writings". Political scientist George Michael writes that Myatt has "arguably done more than any other theorist to develop a synthesis of the extreme right and Islam," and is "arguably England's principal proponent of contemporary neo-Nazi ideology and theoretician of revolution." In 2021 the Counter Extremism Project listed Myatt as one of the world's 20 most dangerous extremists.

Michael described Myatt as an "intriguing theorist" whose "Faustian quests" involved a variety of political groups, ideologies, and traditions. Myatt is regarded as an "example of the axis between right-wing extremists and Islamists". He has been described as an "extremely violent, intelligent, dark, and complex individual", and as a key Al-Qaeda propagandist. His satanic writings under the Long name have hailed Adolf Hitler as the manifestation of the "Satanic spirit". Senholt argued that Myatt's turn to Islam was a manifestation of ONA "insight role" ideology and part of a "satanic game". Myatt has also translated and commentated on various Ancient Greek texts. These texts form the basis of much of the ONA's hermetic doctrine.

According to Daniel Koehler of the International Centre for Counter-Terrorism, Myatt "is a complex persona who defies simple answers to the question of why he changed groups and milieus so often and so fundamentally. It is also obvious, that during large parts of his life, Myatt was driven by a search for meaning and purpose." Scholar Andrew G. Palella argued that "it would be a mistake to dismiss Myatt as a simple racist neo-Nazi or a deranged Satanist, as contemporary media often implies. Myatt is, in fact, a very well-read autodidact and self-styled intellectual and theologian, albeit also an extreme, bizarre, and contradictory man." Myatt has, on various occasions, threatened to duel, with deadly weapons, journalists who have written about him in ways he disagreed with.
