= National Socialist Movement (UK, 1997) =

British neo-Nazi organisation

- Abbreviation: NSM
- Leader: David Myatt; Tony Williams
- Founded: June 1997
- Dissolved: ~1999
- Ideology: British fascism Neo-Nazism; Opposition to immigration
- Political position: Far-right

The National Socialist Movement (NSM) was a British neo-Nazi group active during the late 1990s. The group is not connected to the earlier National Socialist Movement of Colin Jordan.

== Origins ==
The roots of the NSM lay in a split that developed in Combat 18 in the mid to late 1990s. According to Searchlight, a long running anti-fascist magazine reported that David Myatt tried had planned the creation of an Aryan community. In early 1997 it was claimed on ITV's World in Action that the original leader of Combat 18 Charlie Sargent, who at the time was on remand for the murder of fellow C18 member Chris Castle, had acted as a paid informant for the police, although no evidence for this allegation was provided. Whilst Sargent was disowned by some of the rank and file membership of C18, his brother Steve, also a C18 member, supported Sargent and together with David Myatt led away fifty or so like-minded members to form a separate group, the National Socialist Movement, in June 1997.

== Development ==
David Myatt was the first leader of the NSM until his resignation in March 1998 following his arrest by detectives from Scotland Yard on charges relating to incitement to racial hatred and incitement to murder when Tony Williams, a former member of the International Third Position, assumed the position of leader. Williams, who had also been involved with the National Front since the 1970s, had been the person chosen to escort the ashes of Savitri Devi to Arlington, Virginia where they were given to the American Nazi Party. As leader, the duties of Williams included overseeing membership inquiries and levying the £10 annual fee from registered supporters.

Mike Whine of the Board of Deputies of British Jews described the NSM as a "very small but very violent neo-Nazi group. Their whole programme is one of terrorism ... against Jews, against blacks and against Asians." Myatt, who was the architect of the NSM, denied that NSM supported racial hatred but admitted that they intended to accomplish their aim of "an entirely new society, based upon personal honour" through revolutionary activity. The group's own mission statement claimed that the NSM was "formed in June 108 yf ["Year of the Führer" - a system of measuring the years from Adolf Hitler's birth also employed by the National Alliance and similar groups] for the purpose of championing the cause of Aryan identity and Aryan freedom" whilst also committing the group to the establishment of a "National Socialist State", and although the NSM claimed to be a political party, much of its literature advocated violent revolution.

Steve Sargent served as propaganda director of the new group and produced their magazine White Dragon, which, although a neo-Nazi publication, garnered a following due to its often humorous style of reporting and Sargent's propensity to fill its pages with his take on events at his favourite football club, Arsenal. A further magazine was also published in support of the NSM, sharing the name Column 88 with an earlier neo-Nazi paramilitary group, although this was as much a personal concern of Williams as White Dragon was of Sargent.

== Nail bomber ==
The NSM was not widely known until 1999 when David Copeland, the London nail-bomber, received six life sentences for his April 1999 bombing campaign against London's black, Asian, and gay communities, which killed three people, including a pregnant woman, and injured 129, some of whom lost limbs. Copeland, who had joined the NSM after becoming disillusioned with the British National Party, served as Hampshire organiser for the group.

David Myatt would claim that the attacks had been the work of Copeland on his own and could not be blamed on the NSM. Nonetheless the arrest of Copeland saw the other members of the NSM go to ground.

== Bibliography ==
- "The Nailbomber", transcript of BBC Panorama documentary, aired June 30, 2000
- Lowles, Nick. (2003) White Riot: The Violent Story of Combat 18. Milo Books ISBN 1-903854-00-8
- McLagan, Graeme & Lowles, Nick (2000) Mr. Evil: The Secret Life of Racist Bomber and Killer David Copeland. John Blake Publishing ISBN 1-85782-416-4
- Ryan, Nick. (2003) Homeland: Into A World of Hate. Mainstream Publishing Company Ltd. ISBN 1-84018-465-5
- Goodrick-Clarke, Nicholas. (2001) Black Sun: Aryan Cults, Esoteric Nazism and the Politics of Identity. New York University Press ISBN 0-8147-3124-4 ISBN 0-8147-3155-4 (Paperback)
