= Order of the Jarls of Baelder =

Neopagan society

- Founded: 1990
- Founder: Stephen Bernard Cox
- Founded at: Reading, Berkshire, England
- Dissolved: 2005
- Website: arktion.org

The Order of the Jarls of Baelder (OJB) was a British folkish neopagan society founded in 1990 by Stephen Bernard Cox. It was renamed to Arktion Federation in 1998. The group was both neopagan and Satanist in its ideology, and has been described by scholars as fascist or neo-Nazi in nature.

== History ==
The Order of the Jarls of Baelder was founded by Stephen Bernard Cox in 1990 in Reading, Berkshire, England. Cox had been briefly associated in the 1980s with the neo-Nazi Satanist group Order of Nine Angles, Cox having published the ONA's book Naos in 1990 under the imprint of his Coxland Press and Antares by ONA member Christos Beest in 1993. It was associated with Cox's other group, the Fraternitas Loki.

According to scholar Nicholas Goodrick-Clarke, it grew quickly after its establishment in 1990 and had a few hundred members internationally by 2002. It was renamed to Arktion Federation in 1998. Members were recruited from the white power music scene. The group dissolved in 2005.

== Beliefs and activates ==
The OJB advocated "pan-European" "neo-tribalism" pursuing the "aeonic destiny of Europe" and the emergence of the elitist Superman. Gay members were encouraged to join because it was felt they added to the male bonding of the organization. The OJB symbol consisted of the valknut combined with the Gemini sign within a broken curved-armed swastika. The group was classified as fascist Satanism by the scholar Christopher Partridge. Goodrick-Clarke classed them as "pagan-satanic" or "Nazi-satanic". Members were provided with correspondences courses and allowed access to an extensive occult reference library; this same library served as a repository for the materials of several other neo-Nazi Satanist groups. They also put out the magazine Bælder.

The OJB denied being Nazis. Instead, the society claimed to have advocated pan-European neo-tribalism which involved celebration of the rich tapestry of cultural diversity of humanity, study of Aryan traditions and heritage, pursuing the "aeonic destiny of Europe" and the emergence of the elitist super race as an element of the unfolding of variant global/continental cultural forms. The activities of the OJB which functioned as a spiritual and heritage group for people of any race or religion included such activities as rock climbing, hang gliding, hiking and the study of runes.
