= Joshua Caleb Sutter =

American neo-Nazi (born 1981)

- Born: 1981 (age 45); South Carolina, U.S.
- Other names: Wulfran Hall, Swissdiscipline
- Occupations: Book publisher, author, FBI informant
- Organization(s): Aryan Nations, Church of the Sons of Yaweh, Rural People's Party, New Bihar Mandir, Tempel ov Blood, Atomwaffen Division
- Movement: Neo-Nazism
- Spouse: Jillian Hoy (m. 2009)

Joshua Caleb Sutter (born 1981), also known as Wulfran Hall, is an American neo-Nazi, Satanist, book publisher, and FBI informant. The son of a white supremacist activist, Sutter became a Christian Identity adherent and was a Pennsylvania-area leader of Aryan Nations in the early 2000s. He attracted attention from law enforcement for repeatedly praising jihadist suicide bombers, suggesting that white supremacists emulate their tactics, and advocating for alliances between white supremacists and jihadists. He was appointed the "Minister for Islamic Liaison" of the Aryan Nations, before joining a spinoff group, the Church of the Sons of Yaweh.

Following a 2003 arrest on gun charges, Sutter pleaded guilty and was sentenced to two years in prison. While imprisoned he became an informant for the Federal Bureau of Investigation and was released early. Though Sutter was widely suspected of being an informant by other members of the far-right for decades, this was not publicly confirmed until 2021. The FBI paid Sutter over US$140,000 for his services from 2003 to 2021, and used his house as part of a scheme to target Americans who were pro-North Korea. He also operated a Hindu sect for some time.

Following his exit from the Aryan Nations, Sutter founded the Tempel ov Blood (ToB), a group affiliated with the Order of Nine Angles (ONA) that mixes Satanism with Hinduism, neo-Nazism, and radical Islam. Through the ToB's publisher Martinet Press, Sutter authored and published several influential neo-Nazi books: Liber 333, Iron Gates, and Bluebird. The ToB, and Sutter, infiltrated and ideologically influenced the later development of the neo-Nazi group the Atomwaffen Division, causing controversy among its members and leading to many leaving. Sutter's informant work was also instrumental in the prosecutions against that group. He has been a major force in spreading the ONA's ideology and influenced the sextortion network 764.

== Early life ==
Joshua Caleb Sutter was born in 1981 in South Carolina. His father, David Sutter, was a Pentecostal minister and white supremacist activist. David Sutter was a member of the neo-Confederate group the League of the South. Joshua Sutter became active in white supremacist circles in his teenage years. He had an interest in the Order of Nine Angles, a Satanist neo-Nazi group, as far back as 1997, when he was 15 or 16. An individual under his alias Wulfran Hall was recorded as contributing to their original ritual music that year. Sutter briefly enrolled in the U.S. Navy in 2000. He served from June to July, before failing out of basic training.

== Aryan Nations ==
Sutter became a Christian Identity adherent (a white supremacist interpretation of Christianity) and was a member of the Christian Identity group Aryan Nations. Many of his writings were displayed on their website. In 2002, there was a schism in the Aryan Nations. A group of Aryan Nations members, led by August Kreis, claimed to oust the founder, Richard Butler. This was not universally accepted and led to a schism between Butler's Idaho Aryan Nations and Kreis's Pennsylvania Aryan Nations. Kreis set up a 3 person high council for his schism, which included Sutter, Charles Juba, and Morris Gullet. Sutter was a leader in this Pennsylvania branch led by Kreis.

At the time, Sutter was a close associate of Kreis; a local newspaper columnist called them the "dumb and dumber" of the neo-Nazi movement. Sutter moved in with him and his family in 2002. In July 2002, he appeared with Kreis and James Wickstrom in front of the media to represent the Aryan Nations. Sutter attended the Aryan Nations World Congress that year.

=== White jihadism ===
While in the Aryan Nations, Sutter gained notoriety for, following the September 11 attacks, repeatedly praising jihadists, advocating that white supremacist radicals emulate the tactics of jihadists, and attempting to form alliances between white supremacists and Islamic radicals. This drew the attention of federal law enforcement. On the Aryan Nations website, he repeatedly praised Hezbollah, Hamas, and Palestinian suicide bombers. He and Kreis also advocated the Phineas Priesthood, or the idea of doing attacks for the white supremacist cause. Sutter declared himself a Phineas Priest, and said that he "cannot be broken by any human institution".

In posts on the Aryan Nations website in April 2002, Sutter claimed that "YHVH's children" were brainwashed by the "Zionist occupied government" into engaging in self destruction. He called for the end of United States support for Israel and an end on attacks on Saddam Hussein, and advocated that if this did not occur "Phineas Priests and Priestesses" should perform white suicide bombings and attacks in a way similar to Palestinian guerillas, quoting the Bible in justifying violent acts. He wrote:

Or will it be your son or daughter next who is the suicide bomber not in the distant land of Palestine, but here on American soil? Will the sons and daughters of YHVH God be joining with the zealous soldiers of Mohammed, rising up in righteous indignation? Will the Phineas Priests and Phineas Priestesses begin awaking all over this country to 'execute vengeance upon the heathen, and punishments upon the people' as the Psalmist David foretold? [...] Yea, and NOTHING SHALL ESCAPE THEM.

Sutter was made the "Minister for Islamic Liaison" of the Aryan Nations. The Aryan Nations website later advocated individuals becoming Phineas Priests, advertising this with photos of suicide bombers and Osama bin Laden. He posted a "message of solidarity and support" for Saddam Hussein on their website. He attempted to, and claimed that he had, made contact with Islamic radicals as part of this position. It is unclear if this is true. According to scholar George Michael, he had apparently "spent much time scanning the Internet for secret messages from al Qaeda and Taliban operatives".

=== 2003 arrest ===
By 2003, he had left the Aryan Nations and joined a spinoff group called the Church of the Sons of Yaweh.

As part of a wider investigation into the Christian Identity movement by the Federal Bureau of Investigation, and also due to his interest in forming Islamist-white supremacist alliances, on February 12, 2003, Sutter was arrested in Philadelphia by the FBI for attempting to buy an illegal firearm. He met with undercover agents in a parking lot in Uwchlan Township and bought a Glock 40 with a destroyed serial number from an undercover federal agent. He was then arrested. Sutter was additionally charged with possessing an illegal silencer. Other neo-Nazis claimed this was a sting operation and that Sutter had been talked into participating by the agents.

At the same time, and due to the same probe, the FBI also arrested David Wayne Hull, a leader of the KKK and associate of Sutter, for weapons charges. In May 2003, Sutter pleaded guilty to two weapons charges. He was sentenced to two years in prison.

== After release ==
=== As federal informant ===
While he was imprisoned, Sutter became an informant for the FBI. The FBI proposed he act "in a deep-cover capacity", but otherwise he was instructed to continue the relationships he had in the far-right. Sutter was released from prison early in 2004 due to his work as an informant and placed on probation. He moved back to South Carolina to live with his father. Sutter was paid over US$140,000 for his services from 2003 to 2021. He did not pay taxes on this income, and additionally received US$4,378.60 in travel fees from the FBI.

He went quiet following his release, but began attending mosque; he did surveillance work for the FBI across the country and targeted many different networks at their behest. In 2005, Sutter, alongside his father David Sutter, managed the League of the South's Southern Patriot Shop in Cayce, South Carolina. That year, two members of the Aryan Nations got drunk with Sutter, and were shortly after investigated and imprisoned for bank robbery. Both men then accused Sutter of being a federal informant and being responsible for their arrests. Kreis removed all of Sutter's writings and pictures of him from the site. At the same time, another member of the Aryan Nations, Morris Gulett, accused Sutter of being a federal informant. This began a decades long suspicion among members of the far-right, particularly the Aryan Nations, that Sutter was an informant.

Academic Ariel Koch theorized that it is "not unlikely that Sutter exploited the work as informant for law enforcement agencies as part of his Insight Role", a concept promoted by Sutter. It is an idea within ONA doctrine where one takes on a role that is the exact opposite of what they personally believe. He also noted that Sutter was "in a win-win situation. He gets money from the government and he can continue doing what he likes to do, which is to publish literature that is distributed by neo-Nazis". In addition to Islamism, Sutter also passed out North Korean propaganda, which he claimed was at the direction of North Korea's government. While he was imprisoned, the FBI bought Sutter's family home. They utilized it to target Americans who were pro-North Korea through a fraudulent operation created by the FBI and led by Sutter and Kreis.

Sutter founded the Rural People's Party (RPP), a group that promotes North Korea, Hitler, Stalin, and Jim Jones, based out of his house. They modeled their operations after Jonestown. As the leader of the RPP he became involved in the Songun Politics Study Group USA, another North Korean organization, taking over that group. He then became involved in Hindu esotericism, where he met Jillian Hoy, a woman four years his junior. They married in 2009. He later converted the RPP into a Hindu sect, the New Bihar Mandir, also based out of his house, operating it with Hoy.

In 2005, under his pseudonym Wulfran Hall, he interviewed David Myatt, the probable founder of the Order of Nine Angles and fellow Islamist-Nazi synchronizer, in the ONA's journal Fenrir. In 2008, he became more heavily involved in Order of the Nine Angles, which was then becoming more popular online.

Symbol of the Tempel ov Blood

=== Tempel ov Blood ===
Based on ONA doctrine, Sutter founded the Tempel ov Blood (ToB), an esoteric Satanist organization. The group is small in numbers but has proven greatly ideologically influential on modern neo-Nazi Satanists. The ideology of the ToB is eclectic, and is strongly influenced by Sutter's ideology. One analysis described it as mixing "Satanism, radical Islam and vampirism" with neo-Nazism; it also incorporates Hinduism, pro-North Korean sentiment, and accelerationism. The Tempel ov Blood promotes and espouses the ideology of the ONA. The Tempel ov Blood is sometimes referred to as a cell of the ONA, as a nexion (lodge) of the ONA, or as a group associated with the ONA. Some neo-Nazis deny that ToB is representative of the ONA, largely due to Sutter's history and status as a government informant. Sutter said that his goal with the ToB was to expose ToB followers to repeated violence and other lurid depictions to the extent that they would be radicalized and utterly desensitized to violence, and have no moral compunctions about doing anything the ToB wants them to do, including pedophilia or torture. He wrote that:

This Tempel is in many ways a social programming experiment. While we do create fanatics, we must make the 'fake' adherents entries look as if it is obviously their will and good for them to serve the ToB. It has to be subtle. In the later stages it becomes more overt and at that point is too late for them to change. They become so alienated from humanity that, well, haha, if they tried to go back they will still cause so much disruption.

Sutter's wife Jillian Hoy co-leads the ToB, and is the director of the ToB's publishing house, Martinet Press. Martinet Press was owned and operated by Sutter, and specialized in books focusing on occult and esoteric neo-Nazism; they tend to focus on nihilism, societal collapse, and are generally fictional. It became a popular printer for white supremacist Satanists internationally.

Through Martinet, Sutter published numerous fascist and ONA texts, including books he authored. Sutter authored three books: Liber 333 (2013) and Iron Gates, (2014), and Bluebird (2017), all published by Martinet. Iron Gates is about a gang of Satanists exploring the post-apocalyptic United States while committing acts of extreme violence. A 2024 academic analysis said these books glorify mass murder, terrorism, sadism, and child abuse.

Sutter used the money from the FBI to fund Martinet Press. Another author for Martinet, Ryan Fleming, raped and groomed an underage girl; he wrote for Martinet under the name A.A. Morain. Martinet Press has helped in popularizing the Order of Nine Angles. Sutter used Martinet to promote the ToB. Alongside the publisher, Sutter ran a music project as part of ToB, called Gulag.

=== Atomwaffen Division infiltration ===
Through their shared interests in Nazism and occultism, Sutter met John Cameron Denton, a member of the neo-Nazi group the Atomwaffen Division (AWD). The ToB infiltrated and effectively took over the AWD, beginning in 2017. Following the arrest of the AWD's original founders, they were succeeded as leader by John Cameron Denton. Denton was close to Sutter and influenced by the ToB and changed the direction of the group to be more similar to the ToB. Denton invited ToB members, including Sutter, into the AWD; Sutter became an important leader in the group. He attended many of their in-person meet ups. As part of the AWD, he has used the alias Swissdiscipline.

Denton made Sutter's books required for new initiates and approved them for reading for members. His books became required reading among some sections of the neo-Nazi movement, including the AWD but also The Base and Terrorgram. This enabled Martinet Press to expand in influence across the neo-Nazi scene. This shifted the aesthetic and ideals of the AWD to a more sinister and satanic direction; Sutter's influence became controversial among AWD members who despised the Satanic and violent direction the AWD took, which led to several members leaving.

Sutter's informant work was also instrumental in the prosecutions against that group. Some members of the Order of Nine Angles also blamed Sutter for killing the Order of Nine Angles through his books, infiltration of the AWD, and other actions. Sutter continued to be involved in the AWD's successor, the National Socialist Order. For his time in Atomwaffen, Sutter was paid US$78,000 by the FBI.

=== Outing as federal informant ===
Sutter being an FBI informant was publicly confirmed in 2021 due to documents publicized in the government's case against Atomwaffen Division member Kaleb Cole. This was further publicized in a 2022 piece for Rolling Stone by journalist Ali Winston, in a piece on Ethan Melzer, an ONA adherent convicted of attempting to kill U.S. soldiers. It was also confirmed by a former far-right activist. Cole was under Sutter's influence at the time of the crimes, and Cole's defense moved to suppress all information gained from Sutter, because the FBI did not disclose that all its information on Cole's online web communication had been obtained from Sutter. Sutter was called as a witness in the trial. The FBI has faced criticism for its involvement with Sutter, and have declined to comment on his actions.

Being outed as a federal agent did not make Sutter cease his activities, and he has continued to publish books through Martinet Press. He shut the press down in 2022, replacing it with Agony's Point Press. Sutter and Agony's Point Press have promoted the online sextortion network 764, which has been heavily influenced in some of its symbolism and ideology by Sutter.

== Bibliography ==
- Liber 333 (2013)
- Iron Gates (2014)
- Bluebird (2017)
