= David Wayne Hull =

Leader of the White Knights of the Ku Klux Klan

David Wayne Hull (born c. 1962) is a leader of the White Knights of the Ku Klux Klan, which is considered the most militant as well as the most violent Ku Klux Klan in history.

Hull was indicted in March 2003 for witness tampering, and instructing persons on procedures for creating destructive devices. Hull threatened minorities and workers and patients at abortion clinics. He had built and detonated improvised explosive devices (IEDs) during KKK events, and was recorded instructing individuals on how to place IEDs to cause maximum damage. A jury in western Pennsylvania convicted Hull on seven counts of a ten-count indictment. On February 25, 2005, he was sentenced to 12 years in prison, followed by three years of probation. At the same time and as part of the same investigation, the FBI also arrested Hull's associate Joshua Caleb Sutter.

Hull's criminal record dates back to 1994. He was arrested by the Pittsburgh Joint Terrorism Task Force, which consists of federal, state and local law enforcement agencies. According to the Southern Poverty Law Center, Hull published a newsletter in which he urged readers to write Timothy McVeigh "to tell this great man goodbye."

The Anti-Defamation League, wrote that, in July 2002, Hull attended the neo-Nazi "Aryan Nations World Congress" and he is a follower of Christian Identity, "a racist and anti-Semitic sect whose adherents believe that white people are God's chosen people, descended from the lost tribes of ancient Israel, and that minorities are soulless "mud peoples." In 2003, during an FBI "sting operation" Hull said he wanted grenades to be used to "blow up" abortion clinics. He was subsequently arrested.

Hull's conviction was reversed in part when the United States Court of Appeals for the Third Circuit ruled possession of a pipe bomb in and of itself did not constitute a federal "crime of violence".

Hull was released from federal prison in 2012.
