= Lampshades made from human skin =

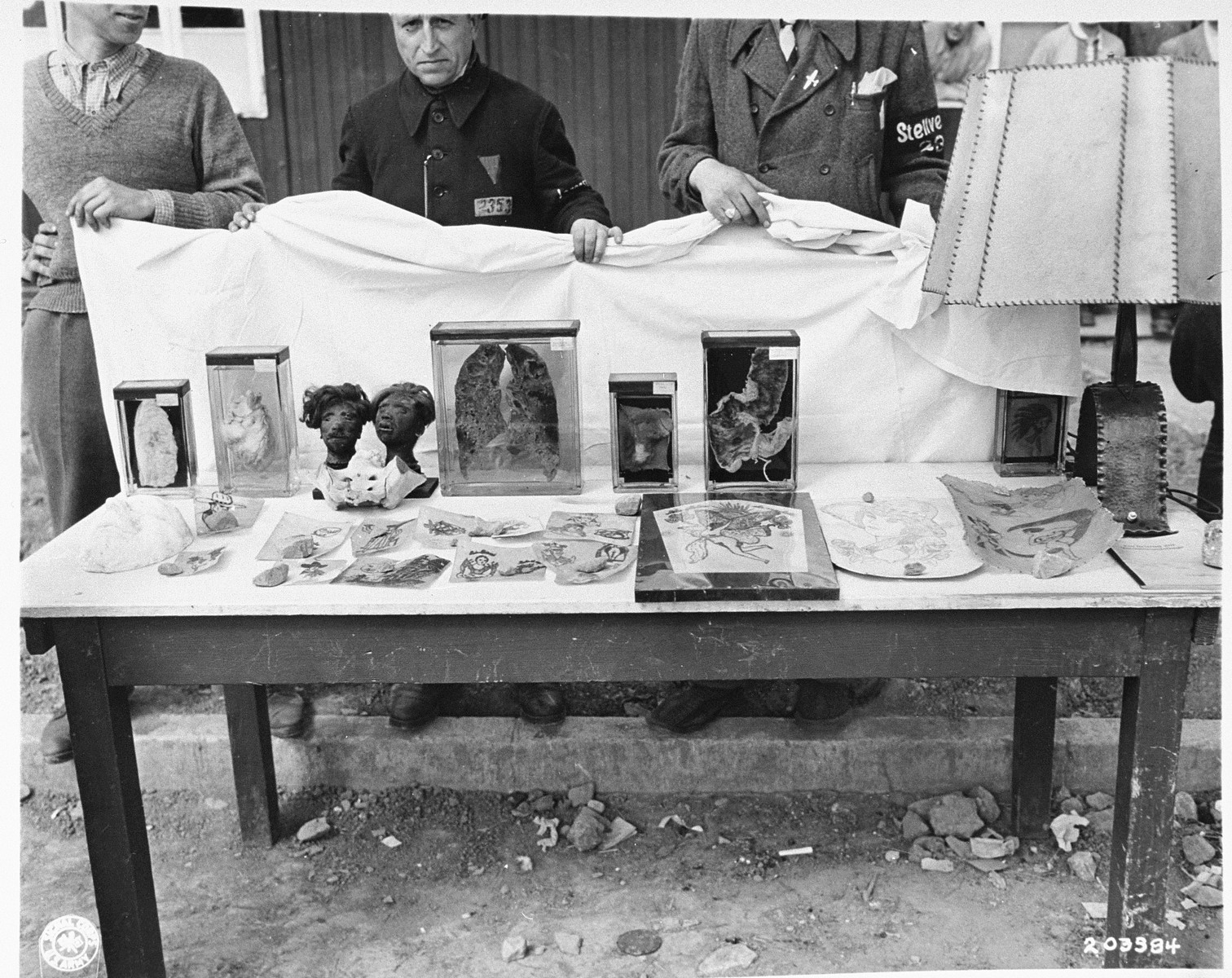
Some human remains at Buchenwald, including a lampshade made of human skin.

There are two notable reported instances of lampshades made from human skin. After World War II, it was claimed that Nazis had made at least one lampshade from murdered concentration camp inmates: a human skin lampshade was displayed by Buchenwald concentration camp commandant Karl-Otto Koch and his wife, Ilse Koch, said to be with other human skin artifacts. Despite myths to the contrary, there were no systematic efforts by the Nazis to make human skin lampshades.

In the 1950s, murderer Ed Gein, possibly influenced by the stories about the Nazis, made a lampshade from the skin of one of his victims.

== History of anthropodermia ==
The display of the flayed skin of defeated enemies has a long history. In ancient Assyria, the flaying of defeated enemies and dissidents was common practice. The Assyrians would leave the skin to tan on their city walls.

There are many examples of books bound in human skin that date from ancient times through the 20th century. In the 2010s, peptide mass fingerprinting technology provided the opportunity to test books in libraries, archives, and private collections that were purported to be bound using the skin of humans. In the first five years of testing, over half of the books tested with this technology were confirmed to be bound with human skin.

== Nazi era and aftermath ==
After the defeat of Nazi Germany, claims circulated that Ilse Koch, wife of the commandant of Buchenwald concentration camp, had possessed lampshades made of human skin and had tattooed prisoners killed specifically in order to use their skin for this purpose. After her conviction for war crimes, General Lucius D. Clay, the interim military governor of the American Zone in Germany, reduced her sentence to four years' prison on the grounds "there was no convincing evidence that she had selected Nazi concentration camp inmates for extermination in order to secure tattooed skins, or that she possessed any articles made of human skin."

Jean Edward Smith, in his biography Lucius D. Clay, an American Life, reported that the general had maintained that the leather lamp shades were really made out of goat skin. The book quotes a statement made by General Clay years later:

There was absolutely no evidence in the trial transcript, other than she was a rather loathsome creature, that would support the death sentence. I suppose I received more abuse for that than for anything else I did in Germany. Some reporter had called her the "Bitch of Buchenwald", had written that she had lamp shades made of human skin in her house. And that was introduced in court, where it was absolutely proven that the lamp shades were made out of goat skin.

The charges were made once more when she was rearrested but again were found to be groundless. The Buchenwald Memorial Foundation states that:

For the existence of a lampshade from human skin there are two credible witnesses who made statements under oath: Dr. Gustav Wegerer, an Austrian political prisoner and kapo of the infirmary, and Josef Ackermann, a political prisoner and secretary of the camp doctor Waldemar Hoven.

- Wegerer explained: "One day at about the same time [1941] the camp commandant Koch and the SS doctor Müller appeared at my work command in the infirmary. At that time a lampshade made of tanned, tattooed human skin was being prepared for Koch. Koch and Müller chose among the available tanned, parchment-thin human skins the ones with suitable tattoos, for the lampshade. From the conversation between the two it became clear that the previously chosen motifs had not pleased Ilse Koch. The lampshade was then completed and handed over to Koch." Dr. Hans Mueller, later SS physician in Obersalzberg, was a pathologist in Buchenwald from March 1941 to April 1942. The time period can be defined more precisely through Ackermann's statement.
- Ackermann delivered the lamp, as he testified in 1950 in court. The lamp-foot was made from a human foot and shinbone; on the shade one saw tattoos and even nipples. On the occasion of the birthday party of Koch [August 1941] he was tasked by the camp doctor Hoven to bring the lamp to the Kochs' villa. This he did. One of the party guests told him later that the presentation of the lamp had been a huge success. The lamp immediately disappeared after the SS leadership learned about it. Ilse Koch could not be accused of making the lampshade.

Five other witnesses testified that they had seen or knew of the existence of human skin artefacts in the possession of Ilse Koch.

In footage taken by American military photographers tasked by then-General Dwight Eisenhower to record what they saw as the army advanced into Germany in 1945, a large lampshade and many other ornaments reportedly made of human skin can be seen alongside shrunken heads of camp prisoners in Buchenwald, all of which were being displayed for German townspeople who were made to tour the camp.

=== Scientific testing of Nazi-era lampshades ===
The lampshade displayed as part of the tour of the camp at Buchenwald was not part of the materials tested for authenticity by U.S. Army personnel after World War II, although pieces of tanned and tattooed skin found at the camp were judged to be human by the Head of Pathology at Seventh Medical Laboratory in New York. British pathologist Bernard Spilsbury also identified pieces of tanned human skin obtained by observers at Buchenwald after the liberation of the camp.

In his 2010 book The Lampshade: A Holocaust Detective Story from Buchenwald to New Orleans, journalist Mark Jacobson claimed to be in possession of a human-skin lampshade made by order of Ilse Koch. Jacobson's lamp underwent DNA testing in the early 1990s. The results seemed to show that the lamp was indeed made of human skin; however, subsequent testing demonstrated that it was actually made of cowhide and that sample contamination likely led to the initial erroneous result. The results of those tests were reported on in the 2012 National Geographic television program "Human Lampshade: A Holocaust Mystery".

In 2019, the Anthropodermic Book Project performed a peptide mass fingerprinting test on an alleged Nazi-era human skin lampshade stored in a small Holocaust museum in the United States; the testing results showed the lampshade was made from plant cellulose.

In 2023, a new study of the lampshade displayed on the desk of Karl-Otto Koch, led by criminal biologist Mark Benecke, concluded that the lampshade was "certainly human skin," and how the report from 1992 came to the conclusion that this lampshade was made of plastic "is not at all clear." Another fragment of this lampshade was located in 2025, having initially been taken from Buchenwald by Ness Edwards and kept in his family home for 80 years. Testing of this fragment after its return to the Buchenwald museum confirmed that it was part of the same lampshade and that it was made out of human skin based on the distribution of pores and the distinctive grain pattern.

== Ed Gein ==
Ed Gein was an American murderer and body snatcher, active in the 1950s in Wisconsin, who made trophies from corpses he stole from a local graveyard. When he was finally arrested, a search of the premises revealed, among other artifacts, a lampshade made out of human skin. Gein appears to have been influenced by the then-current stories about the Nazis collecting body parts in order to make lampshades and other items.

== In popular culture ==
The idea of lampshades made from human skin has become a trope to signify the horrors of the Nazi concentration camps. References to human skin lampshades have appeared in artworks, political speeches, and popular culture.

These references can take the form of literary allusions, such as Sylvia Plath's description of her skin as "bright as a Nazi lampshade" in her 1965 poem, "Lady Lazarus". Plath invoked allusions and images from Nazi Germany to emphasize the speaker's sense of oppression. References also appear in satirical works. In Ken Russell's 2007 short satire A Kitten for Hitler, an American Jewish boy who has a swastika-shaped birthmark tries to soften Hitler's heart by giving him a kitten, but when Hitler sees the boy's Star of David necklace, he has Eva Braun kill the boy to make him into a lampshade for their bedside table lamp. Near the end of the film, in what appears to be an act of God, the swastika birthmark on the lampshade transforms into the Star of David.

The use of this reference can also be employed as an implicit threat or antisemitic expression. In 1995, August Kreis was ejected from the set of The Jerry Springer Show after telling the host, "Your relatives – Weren't they all turned into soap or lampshades? ... I've got your mom in the trunk of my car."

In the Dead Kennedys song California Über Alles, the line ("Come quietly to the camp / you'd look nice as a drawstring lamp") is a reference to the allegations that the Nazis used human skin to create lampshades. The song imagines the nightmarish actions of Governor Jerry Brown's SS-styled secret police detailed earlier in the song.

The use of symbols such as human soap or human skin lampshades in popular culture has led to misunderstandings that there were sustained, systematic efforts to create these products, but these myths have been repeatedly refuted by serious scholars. Holocaust deniers use misunderstandings about phenomena such as the mass production of human soap or human skin lampshades in order to criticize the veracity of the Nazi genocide in general.

== See also ==
- Books bound in human skin
- Soap made from human corpses
- Sedlec Ossuary, a church with furnishings made from human bones
