= Dark Lily =

British Satanist magazine

- Cover of issue 9
- Editor: Magda Graham
- Categories: Satanism
- Frequency: Quarterly
- Publisher: Society of the Dark Lily
- Founder: Victor Norris
- First issue: 1970s
- Final issue Number: 1993 or after 15?
- Country: United Kingdom
- Based in: London
- Language: English
- ISSN: 0954-6006
- OCLC: 499936568

Dark Lily, subtitled variously The Reality of the Left Hand Path or The Voice of Satanism, was a British Satanist magazine based in London. It was established in the late 1970s by the Satanist neo-Nazi activist Victor Norris as the newsletter of his Anglican Satanic Church. It was edited by Magdalane Graham, who helped run the Anglican Satanic Church. Graham soon broke with Norris over his neo-Nazism and continued to publish Dark Lily on her own with the Society of the Dark Lily.

It focused on Satanic topics, but also a number of topics related to occultism, magic, and the left-hand path. It had a frequent focus on sadomasochism. The major Satanist magazine in Britain, it was controversial for its early connections to neo-Nazism. After Graham took control of the magazine, it ceased political activity and disavowed the combination of occultism with politics. It was initially published quarterly but later became irregular and infrequent in its scheduling.

== Background ==
Dark Lily was founded by Thomas Victor Norris, a British neo-Nazi activist. He had previously been a member of the British National Party, the National Front, among other far-right groups, and operated several of his own. He was also a pimp. In 1969 he was imprisoned for a number of sex offenses involving children, including prostituting his children. After serving his sentence, he resumed his far-right activism, and also launched a private investigation agency, Contingency Services; he used a variety of aliases. He claimed to have connections to various government agencies, though it is unclear if this is true. His private investigation agency was utilized by the Home Office to surveil anti-nuclear protestors.

After his sentence was served, Norris became involved in Satanism, founding the Anglican Satanic Church in the late 1970s. He utilized the pseudonym Father Raoul Belphlegor. He was a friend of David Myatt, a fellow neo-Nazi, due to their shared interest in Satanism. Prominent British neo-Nazi Colin Jordan rejected Norris and his associates for their Satanism, considering that their "lunatic" ideology would "give nazis a bad name".

== History ==
Dark Lily was established in the late 1970s as the newsletter of Norris's Anglican Satanic Church. The Anglican Satanic Church did little besides publish the magazine. It was claimed to originate from a much older Satanic group, but there is little evidence for this. The Anglican Satanic Church was frequently confused with the Anglo-Saxonic Church, a different neopagan group that Norris also ran.

Norris recruited as magazine editor Magdalene "Magda" Graham, who became co-leader of the organization. She had previously edited another occult magazine. They worked together on a number of Norris's periodicals, both those focused on the occult and those focused on fascism, and she also edited the journal of Norris's Anglo-Saxonic Church. Within the group she used the pseudonym Mother Lilith. An occultist from Blackburn, Graham had multiple sclerosis, which disabled her and left her severely ill; however, she was skilled at organizing and helped run the group and the periodical. She had similar political views but was initially reluctant to be associated with Norris.

While the official publication of the Anglican Satanic Church, the magazine presented it as a much older organization than it actually was. The Anglican Satanic Church ceased activity in 1983, when Graham and Norris had a split over his neo-Nazi views and connections. She attempted to leave, but experienced difficulties due to her disability; assisted by John Allen, a Scottish Satanist, she eventually managed to leave. Soon after coming onboard the periodical, Graham took control of the periodical and cut ties with Norris, rejecting his views. She continued publishing the magazine. After Graham took control of the magazine, it ceased political activity. In the early 1980s, she established the Society of the Dark Lily (also called Dark Lily), which continued as its own group separate from Norris's. Outside of publishing Dark Lily, the Society of the Dark Lily was a secretive group.

Dark Lily was published in London. The magazine was available exclusively from an anonymous PO box. Initially quarterly, by 1995 it was published irregularly and rarely. Issue 7 was released by 1988, issue 9 by 1989, issue 10 by 1990, issue 12 by 1991, and issue 14 by 1993. It went defunct at some point after publishing its 15th issue in 1993.

== Contents and ideology ==
Dark Lily, subtitled variously The Reality of the Left Hand Path or The Voice of Satanism was a Satanist magazine, though also discussed topics related to a number of related subjects involving the left-hand path, occultism, and magic more broadly. It included experiences and thoughts related to the left-hand path, reviews of related works, listings of other similar periodicals, and advertisements and contact information on other occult groups. Material was frequently presented in dialogue form, with answering of reader questions, and content from "the Adept", who urged free thinkng. It was edited by Magdalane Graham and published by her Society of the Dark Lily. She was also typist. In one article for the magazine, Graham wrote:

You are your only god. It is a frightening concept for the beginner. When completely accepted, it gives a sense of liberation... but so few people want to be free.... No-one to blame, no-one to lean on. No-one to tell you what to do or to punish you when you fail. No-one to help or hinder you. Nobody out there. You are on your own

Initially close to fascism in orientation, after the split from Norris it disavowed political activism and disavowed the combination of occultism and politics. In comparison to other Satanist periodicals, it was more serious in tone. Unlike some Satanist groups and periodicals, it did not define itself simply being in opposition to Christianity, though it was critical of Christian fundamentalists who wanted to eliminate Satanism. It expressed criticisms of the majority of society and the "dominant paradigm", who, it wrote, preferred to follow others, including gods and other leaders. The Society of the Dark Lily issued calls for members from within the periodical, requesting that they be preferably 25 or over from a professional background and of a suitable personality and intelligence, unlike those in most occult groups. It had a readership of a few hundred.

Graham's Satanism did not involve the worship of any figure; she said to The Times that "we believe in neither God nor the Devil. We are atheists, but unlike atheists we do not believe we are alone". Dark Lily wrote that "the only gods are between your ears". It celebrated sexuality and discussed erotica topics, including and with a special focus on sadomasochism; much of its content had sadomasochistic overtones. It had similar interests and ideology to the American Satanist organization the Church of Satan. A reviewer for Factsheet Five described it as "generally in line with the LaVey side of various arguments but quite capable of independent thought". Like the Church of Satan, it viewed individuality as divine. However, it was also similar to the theistic Satanist organization the Temple of Set in its "idea that Satan was a living and sentient being". It was for a time associated with the Temple of Set, carrying advertisements for the organization, but later conflicted with it. Religious studies scholar Graham Harvey wrote that "what Dark Lily wants is debate about alternatives to strengthen pluralism and cross-cultural co-operation" and that it advocated "the celebration of life without limitations".

== Reception and influence ==
It was the major Satanist magazine in Britain; John Parker identified it as the "foremost of Britain's satanic magazines" and "influential and sternly authoritative". The American Satanist magazine The Black Flame wrote that it was, as of 1990, the only non-political Satanist magazine in the country. Graham Harvey described its publisher as one of a few non-Church of Satan Satanist organizations. Its issues were reviewed several times in the magazine review journal Factsheet Five. In a review of the seventh issue, the reviewer criticized the editor's writing as "maddeningly non-specific in most cases"; later reviews were more positive. A review of the tenth issue praised it for its more serious and restrained approach to the material in comparison to other left-hand path works and their "flashy, fashion-conscious Satanism". A review of the fourteenth issue praised its writing quality.

The magazine was controversial for its early connections to Nazism, though when Graham took control it ceased connection to far-right politics. Scholar of Satanism Massimo Introvigne noted it as an example of "connections with neo-Nazism, prostitution, and pedophilia plague[ing] for decades the small British Satanist organizations". He identified it as one of several obscure Satanist groups that had connections with Nazism, including the Order of Nine Angles and Joy of Satan; Introvigne noted them as having this in common with the Temple of Set.

== See also ==
- Order of the Black Ram
