= August Kreis =

American neo-Nazi leader and convicted child molester

- Born: August Byron Kreis III; November 2, 1954
- Died: May 2025 (aged 70–71)
- Occupation: Former Director of Aryan Nations
- Spouse: Unknown (divorced)
- Children: 3

August Byron Kreis III (November 2, 1954—May 2025) was an American neo-Nazi leader, Christian Identity minister, and convicted child molester. He was a member of the Ku Klux Klan (KKK), the Posse Comitatus, and Aryan Nations.

== Biography ==
Kreis first became interested and active in the white supremacy movement in high school. After dropping out of a Newark, New Jersey high school, he served in the U.S. Navy for nine months, but he was discharged early "based on a determination that he was not suited for military service." He then spent 13 years as a member of the KKK and eventually became a Klan leader. He joined the Posse Comitatus in the late 1980s.

In 1999, Kreis joined Aryan Nations. In 2002, there was a schism in the Aryan Nations led by Kreis, claimed to oust the founder, Richard Butler. This was not universally accepted and led to a schism between Butler's Idaho Aryan Nations and Kreis's Pennsylvania Aryan Nations. Kreis set up a 3 person high council for his schism, which included Joshua Caleb Sutter, Charles Juba, and Morris Gullet. At the time, Sutter was a close associate of Kreis; a local newspaper columnist called them the "dumb and dumber" of the neo-Nazi movement. After the death of Aryan Nations leader Richard Girnt Butler, in a power struggle, Kreis assumed leadership positions within Aryan Nations, which caused a split within the organization.

Kreis was locally known for harassing neighbors and townspeople who he disagreed with. Police lodged numerous charges against him, but he was never convicted of any of them. After a divorce from his first wife, he was barred from contacting her.

In 2005, he received media attention by seeking to form an Aryan Nations-al Qaeda alliance. CNN reported that "while August Kreis may be calling, there is no sign that al Qaeda is listening." His statements raised concerns about possible violations of the law and as a result, the federal government closely scrutinized his activities and finances. The federal government concluded that he had no link to any terrorist organization. In the process, the government discovered that "substantial unreported funds" were going into his bank accounts with more than $33,000 in unreported income in 2005.

Although Kreis only spent a short time in the Navy, he served in it during wartime, and as a result, he received an "improved pension" based on financial need, which is adjusted based on income. In 2009, he moved from Potter County, Pennsylvania to Lexington, South Carolina.

In June 2011, Kreis was arrested in Obion County, Tennessee on "felony charges for filing fraudulent statements in an effort to obtain veterans benefits." According to the U.S. Attorney's Office, "The indictment alleges that Kreis provided false information about whether he had any income in reports that he submitted to the Department of Veterans Affairs." He had refused to surrender when the charges were filed. He was held in a federal detention center.

In August 2011, he pleaded guilty to lying to Veterans Administration officials in order to get pension money which he was not entitled to receive, and he faced a possible sentence of five years in prison and a fine of $250,000. In December 2011, he was sentenced to six months in jail. He ultimately served six months of home arrest followed by two years of probation and he was required to pay back the nearly $193,000 of improperly received benefits.

In early 2012, he left Aryan Nations while he was in prison, passing his leadership of the organization to Drew Bostwick.

On February 19, 2014, Kreis was arrested on six counts of sexual abuse of children in Richland County, South Carolina.

After a three-day trial, a Lexington County jury found Kreis, age 61, guilty of one count of criminal sexual conduct involving a minor child and two counts of committing lewd acts on a child. On November 5, 2015, a Lexington County, South Carolina judge sentenced Kreis to 50 years in prison for child molestation: two 15-year sentences and one 20-year sentence, all of them will run consecutively. During his sentencing, he held up a sign urging people to vote for Donald Trump for president. This prompted the attorney for Kreis to ask for a mistrial, but the judge rejected the request and instead instructed the jury to focus on the evidence.

Kreis was an amputee, having lost both of his legs to diabetes.

== Personal life ==
Kreis had three children.

In the 90s, Kreis appeared with his children on television, such as The Jerry Springer Show, where they appeared in 1993 and 1995. On the latter episode ("A Racist Family", aired on February 20, 1995), host Jerry Springer kicked Kreis off after he made threats, stated that Springer's mother had been murdered, stated that her skin had been stretched over a frame and stated that the frame was made into a lampshade, which was stashed in the trunk of Kreis's car. One of Kreis's daughters, Jennifer, also threatened to kill Springer's daughter for being Jewish.

In the 2020s, Jennifer began speaking out against her father. She expressed regret for the bigotry she expressed on television. She also claimed that she had been initially exposed to her father's radical ideology following her parents' divorce when she was 12. It was due to the novelty of her radical beliefs that the family was brought onto The Jerry Springer Show. According to Jennifer, her family was paid $1,000 per episode.

Jennifer also accused her father of child abuse. She left home at age 18. She also reported her father for child abuse, although authorities refused to investigate.

Kreis died while he was in prison in May 2025.
