= Combat 18 =

British neo-Nazi organisation

- C18 uses the Totenkopf as its symbol.
- Other name: C18, 318
- Founder: Charlie Sargant
- Founded: 1992
- Split from: British National Party
- Country: United Kingdom (country of origin)
- Active regions: Worldwide
- Ideology: Neo-Nazism
- Political position: Far-right
- Status: Active; Banned in Canada, Germany

Combat 18 (C18 or 318) is a neo-Nazi organisation that was founded in 1992. It originated in the United Kingdom with ties to movements in Canada and the United States. Since then, it has spread to other countries, including Germany. Combat 18 members have been suspected of being involved in and directly responsible for the deaths of numerous immigrants, non-whites, dissidents, and the German politician Walter Lübcke as well as internecine killings of Combat 18 members.

On 21 June 2019, the government of Canada added Combat 18 (alongside its affiliate Blood & Honour) to its list of terrorist organisations, which was the first time that a far-right group was added to the list. Members in the UK are barred from joining the UK Prison Service, the armed forces, and police. On 23 January 2020, the German government announced a ban of the German offshoot of Combat 18.

== Name ==
Combat 18's name is often abbreviated "C18". The "18" in its name is derived from the initials of the Nazi German leader Adolf Hitler: A and H are the first and eighth letters of the Latin alphabet.

== History ==
=== Founding ===
In early 1992, the far-right British National Party (BNP) formed Combat 18 as a stewarding group whose purpose was to protect its events from anti-fascists. It was founded by Charlie Sargent.

C18 soon attracted national attention for threats of violence against immigrants, members of ethnic minorities, and leftists. In 1992, it started publishing the Redwatch magazine, which contained photographs, names, and addresses of political opponents. Combat 18 is an openly neo-Nazi group that is devoted to violence and hostile to electoral politics, and for this reason Sargent split decisively from the BNP in 1993.

=== 1997: murder of Christopher Castle ===
Sargent split with his former C18 colleagues over allegations that he was an informer for the British security services. The rival faction, led by Wilf "The Beast" Browning, wanted Sargent to return the C18 membership list in exchange for the return of his plastering tools and £1,000. However, such was the animosity and fear between them that a mutually acceptable go-between, 28-year-old C18 member "Catford Chris" Castle was driven to Sargent's mobile home in Harlow, Essex by Browning, who waited in the car while Castle went to visit Sargent. He was met at the door by Charlie Sargent and his political associate, as well as former Skrewdriver guitarist Martin Cross. Cross plunged a nine-inch (22 cm) blade into Castle's back. Browning took Castle to hospital in a taxi, but doctors were unable to save him and he died shortly after arrival.

Despite Sargent's attempt to implicate Browning, Sargent was convicted of murder at Chelmsford Crown Court the following year. He and Cross were sentenced to life imprisonment. Cross remains in prison and, following a short period on licence, Sargent was returned to custody on the weekend of 15 November 2014.

=== Post-Sargent history ===
Between 1998 and 2000, dozens of Combat 18 members in the United Kingdom and Ireland were arrested on various charges during dawn raids by the police. These raids were part of several operations which were conducted by Scotland Yard in co-operation with MI5. Those arrested included Steve and Bill Sargent (Charlie Sargent's brothers), David Myatt, and two serving British soldiers, Darren Theron (Parachute Regiment) and Carl Wilson. One of those whose house was raided was Adrian Marsden, who later became a councillor for the British National Party (BNP). Several of those arrested were later imprisoned, including Andrew Frain (seven years) and Jason Marriner (six years).

Some journalists believed that the White Wolves are a C18 splinter group, alleging that the group had been set up by Del O'Connor, the former second-in-command of C18 and a member of Skrewdriver Security. The document issued by the White Wolves announcing their formation has been attributed to David Myatt, whose Practical Guide to Aryan Revolution allegedly inspired the nailbomber David Copeland, who was jailed for life in 2000 after being found guilty of causing a series of bombings in April 1999 that killed three people and injured many others.

A group calling itself the Racial Volunteer Force split from C18 in 2002, although it has retained close links to its parent organisation. On 28 October 2003, German police officers conducted raids on 50 properties in Kiel and Flensburg that were believed to be linked to German supporters of the group. The Anti-Defamation League says there are Combat 18 chapters in Illinois, Florida, and Texas. On 6 September 2006, the Belgian police arrested 20 members of Combat 18 Flanders. Fourteen of them were soldiers in the Belgian army.

C18 has long been associated with loyalists in Northern Ireland. In July 2008, "C18" was painted on St Mary's Oratory in County Londonderry. On 18 June 2009, graves belonging to numerous people, including Provisional Irish Republican Army hunger-striker Bobby Sands were desecrated with C18 graffiti. Racist attacks on immigrants continue to be carried out by members of C18. Weapons, ammunition, and explosives have been seized by police in the UK and almost every country in which C18 is active. In late 2010, five members of Combat 18 Australia (among them Jacob Marshall Hort and Bradley Neil Trappitt) were charged over an attack on a mosque in Perth, Western Australia. Several rounds were fired from a high-powered rifle into the Canning Turkish Islamic Mosque, causing over $15,000 damage.

There is a Finnish chapter of Combat 18 based in Harjavalta. On 2 October 2015, there was a neo-Nazi demonstration in Tampere with about 80 participants from Combat 18 and other Nazi groups. Attendants wore Totenkopf and SS symbols and one neo-Nazi choked out an antifascist counterdemonstrator. Combat 18 demonstrated in Harjavalta together with the Racial Volunteer Force. After Pori received refugees, C18 also organized street patrols together with unaffiliated local citizens.

The online forum presence of Combat 18 was officially ended at the end of November 2014, with the Combat 18 forum redirecting to a US-based nationalist video and DVD merchandising store which now owns the domain. On 6 March 2018, eight members of Combat 18 were arrested in Athens, Greece, accused of multiple attacks on immigrants and activists. They had 50 kg of ANFO in their possession.

In 2019, the Serbian chapter of Combat 18 was discovered to be trafficking firearms to Atomwaffen members, selling handguns, assault rifles, grenades and RPG-7s from the Balkans to French neo-Nazis in Marseille.

Combat 18 was the target of renewed law enforcement attention on 10 December 2025, when New Zealand banned the Order of Nine Angles (O9A) as a terrorist organization. The New Zealand Police said in a statement that Combat 18 had been instrumental in setting up the O9A.

=== Murder of Walter Lübcke ===
An alleged member of the German branch of Combat 18 named Stephen Ernst was the suspect in the case of the murdered local politician Walter Lübcke of the Christian Democratic Union of Germany. Ernst confessed to the crime on 25 June 2019. The Federal Minister of the Interior, Horst Seehofer, then announced his intention to ban the organisation in Germany.

On 23 January 2020, the 75th anniversary of Allied forces liberated the Auschwitz concentration camp, the German Minister of the Interior banned Combat 18 nationwide in Germany. More than 200 police officers carried out raids in six German states, seizing mobile phones, computers, unspecified weaponry, Nazi memorabilia, and propaganda material.

== Links with football hooliganism ==
Members of the organisation include known football hooligans and groups. The most high-profile incident involving Combat 18 members in football came on 15 February 1995 when violence broke out in the stands at Lansdowne Road in the international friendly between Ireland and England. There was also taunting of "No Surrender to the IRA" aimed at Irish fans. The violence was so bad that the match had to be abandoned.

Before the 1998 FIFA World Cup, 26 Seaburn Casuals (Sunderland AFC supporters) hooligans were arrested in a police raid after a military-issue smoke bomb was let off at a local pub following a fight with bouncers. By the end of the operation, over 60 were facing charges. Some of the Seaburn Casuals hooligans arrested were involved with Combat 18. The case was dropped when a judge ruled that CCTV footage from the pub was inadmissible as evidence.

== Bans and terrorist designations ==
Members in the UK are barred from joining the UK Prison Service, the armed forces, and the police.

=== Canada terrorism list ===
On 21 June 2019, the government of Canada added Combat 18 (alongside its affiliate Blood & Honour) to its list of terrorist organisations, which was the first time that a far-right group was added to the list. This was in part due to Canada's response to the Christchurch mosque shootings and a petition to Canada's Federal Government: EPetition e-2019 by #NoPlace2Hate. This meant that criminal acts by members of the group now fall under Canada's Criminal Code for Terrorism, allowing the state to prosecute additional crimes such as making financial contributions to a known terrorist organisation.

=== Ban in Germany ===
On 23 January 2020, the German government announced and enforced an order banning "Combat 18 Deutschland", the German offshoot of Combat 18. The order by the Ministry of the Interior states that "Combat 18 Deutschland" is directed against the constitutional order, that its goals and activities are contrary to criminal law, and that it undermines understanding among nations. The order stipulates that the organisation be dissolved and that all assets of the organisation be seized and confiscated; in addition, signs of the organisation must no longer be used and no replacement organisation may be formed. On the day of the announcement, more than 200 police officers raided the homes of the organisation's leading members. According to the government, at the time of the ban the organisation had "approximately 20 members" and "an unknown number of sympathisers". The Interior Ministry linked the decision to the murder of Walter Lübcke and the Halle synagogue shooting.

"Combat 18 Deutschland" filed suit against the ban in the Federal Administrative Court and asked the court to preliminarily enjoin the ban's enforcement pending a decision on the merits. In September 2020, the court rejected the latter request, stating that the public interest in the immediate enforcement of the ban prevailed over the organisation's interests, further noting that the challenge against the ban will likely not succeed as the court's summary examination of the merits suggests that the organisation's activities are indeed directed against the constitutional order.
