= 1999 London nail bombings =

Series of terror attacks in the British capital

1999 London bombings
- 1999 London nail bombings (Greater London) 1999 London nail bombings (the United Kingdom)
- Location: London, England
- Date: 17 April 1999 – 30 April 1999
- Target: Black, Bangladeshi and LGBT people in London
- Attack type: Bombings
- Weapon: Nail bomb
- Deaths: 3
- Injuries: 140
- Victims: Andrea Dykes, 27; Nik Moore, 31; John Light, 32
- Perpetrator: David James Copeland
- Motive: White supremacy, neo-Nazism, homophobia, racism and attempt to start a race war in England

The 1999 London nail bombings were a series of bomb explosions in London, England. Over three successive weekends between 17 and 30 April 1999, homemade nail bombs were detonated in Brixton in south London; at Brick Lane, Spitalfields, in the East End; and at the Admiral Duncan pub in Soho in the West End. Each bomb contained up to 1,500 100-millimetre (3.9 in) nails in duffel bags that were left in public spaces. The bombs killed three people and injured 140 people, four of whom lost limbs.

On 2 May 1999, the Metropolitan Police Anti-Terrorist Branch charged 22-year-old David Copeland with murder. Copeland, who became known as the "London nail bomber", was a neo-Nazi militant and a former member of two political groups, the British National Party and then the National Socialist Movement. The bombings were aimed at London's Black, Bengali and LGBT communities. Copeland was convicted of murder in 2000 and given six life sentences.

== Overview ==
=== Electric Avenue bomb ===
The first bombing, on Saturday, 17 April 1999, was in Electric Avenue, Brixton, an area of south London with a large black population. The bomb was made using explosives from fireworks, taped inside a sports bag, primed and left at Brixton Market. The Brixton Market traders became suspicious, and one of them, Gary Shilling, moved the bag to a less crowded area after seeing perpetrator Copeland acting suspiciously. Two further moves of the bomb occurred by unconvinced traders, including the bomb being removed from the bag, which is when it ended up next to the Iceland supermarket. Concerned traders called the police, who arrived at the scene just as the bomb detonated at 5:25 pm. Forty-eight people were injured, many of them seriously because of the 4-inch (100 mm) nails that were packed around the bomb. The explosion was strong, sending nails in all directions, blowing windows and blasting a parked car across the street.

=== Brick Lane bomb ===
The second bomb, on the following Saturday, 24 April, was aimed at Brick Lane in the East End of London, which has a large Bangladeshi community. There is a street market on Sundays, but perpetrator Copeland mistakenly tried to plant the bomb on Saturday when the street was less busy. Unwilling to change the timer on the bomb, he instead left it in a black Reebok bag on Hanbury Street. There it was picked up by a man who brought it to the police station on Brick Lane, which was shut. The man had placed it in the boot of his Ford Sierra car which was parked outside number 42 Brick Lane, where it exploded. Thirteen people were injured, and surrounding buildings and cars were severely damaged.

=== Admiral Duncan bomb ===
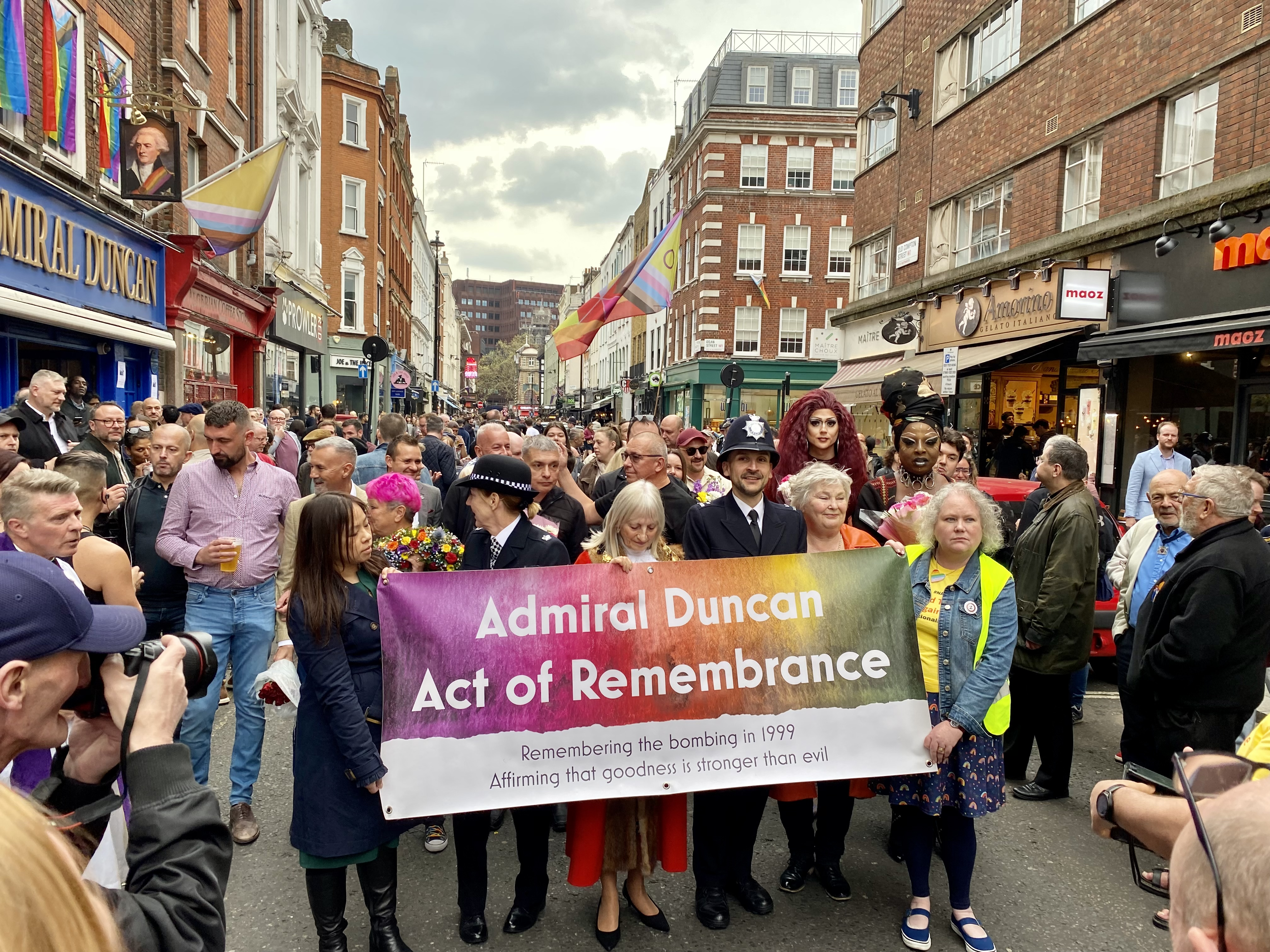
The 2023 act of remembrance marking the anniversary of the bombing

The third and final bomb was planted and detonated on the evening of Friday, 30 April at The Admiral Duncan pub on Old Compton Street in Soho, the heart of London's gay community. At the time, the pub and the street outside were crowded because the evening was the start of a bank holiday weekend. The unattended sports bag containing the bomb, which was taped inside, was noticed by patrons of the Admiral Duncan; however, the bomb exploded at 6:37 pm just as the bag was being investigated by the pub manager, Mark Taylor. Three people were killed and a total of seventy-nine were injured, many of them seriously. Four of the survivors had to have limbs amputated.

== Victims ==
Location	Casualties	Deaths
Brixton	48	0
Brick Lane	13	0
Soho	79	3

At the pub bombing in Soho, Andrea Dykes, 27, four months pregnant with her first child, died along with her friends and hosts for the evening, Nik Moore, 31, and John Light, 32, who was to be the baby's godfather. Andrea's husband, Julian, whom she married in August 1997, was seriously injured. The four friends from Essex had met up in the Admiral Duncan to celebrate Andrea's pregnancy.

== Investigation and arrest ==
Following the Brixton bombing, officials initially emphasised that IRA involvement was unlikely and that it was more likely to be the work of right-wing terrorists following the Stephen Lawrence Inquiry that was released at the time, or a 'copycat' of Edgar Pearce. On 19 April, Combat 18, a neo-Nazi terrorist organisation, claimed responsibility via telephone. By the time of the Brick Lane bombing a week later, which the police linked with the Brixton bombing, it was clear that a racist entity was behind the attacks. It also ignited fears of racial tensions, particularly after the release of the Stephen Lawrence Inquiry in February, and as Brixton was the scene of race riots in 1981.

Although these had been described by the police as specifically race-hate attacks, they had issued a warning that a gay bar could potentially be the bomber's next target, and The Yard – a pub in the Soho area – had displayed a poster warning customers to be alert. On Thursday, 29 April, CCTV footage from the Brixton attack was given wide publicity after an image of the suspected bomber was identified on it. This caused Copeland to bring forward his planned bombing of the Admiral Duncan to Friday evening. Paul Mifsud, a colleague of Copeland, recognised him from the footage and alerted the police about an hour and twenty minutes before the third bombing.

The Admiral Duncan bombing was linked to the previous ones by police, with far-rightists once again the prime suspects. Two hours after the bomb, the neo-Nazi White Wolves organisation claimed responsibility for the attack. It was feared other ethnic minorities, such as Jews and Asians, would be targeted next. Some synagogues increased security as a result.

Copeland was arrested that night once the police obtained his address, a rented room in Sunnybank Road, Cove, Hampshire. He admitted carrying out the three bombings as soon as he opened the door to the police, telling them, "Yeah, they were all down to me. I did them on my own." He showed them his room, where two Nazi flags were hanging on a wall, along with a collection of photographs and newspaper stories about bombings.

In May 2021, the informant 'Arthur', who identified Copeland, spoke to The Guardian about David Copeland and the contemporary threat from the extreme right.

== Perpetrator ==
Photograph of Copeland taken after his arrest in April 1999

David James Copeland was born on 15 May 1976, in Hanworth in the London Borough of Hounslow, to a working-class couple. His father was an engine driver and his mother was a housewife. Copeland lived for most of his childhood with his parents and two brothers in Yateley in Hampshire, attending Yateley School, where he obtained seven GCSEs before leaving in 1992. Journalist Nick Ryan wrote that, as a teenager, Copeland feared he was homosexual; when his parents sang along to the Flintstones theme on television—"we'll have a gay old time"—he reportedly believed they were sending him a message. As an older teenager, he began listening to heavy metal bands and earned himself the nickname "Mr Angry". Ryan wrote that the staff at his school have no recollection of him during this period, as if he had become invisible.

After his arrest following the bombings, Copeland told psychiatrists that he had started having sadomasochistic dreams when he was about twelve years old, including dreams or fantasies that he had been reincarnated as an SS officer with access to women as slaves. He left school for a series of failed jobs, reportedly blaming immigrants for the difficult job market. Copeland became involved in petty crime, drinking and drug abuse. His father was eventually able to get him a job as an engineer's assistant on the London Underground.

Copeland's father called him "fairly intelligent" as a child. His parents separated when he was aged 19, and his mother told lawyers and psychiatrists after the arrest that he was a "happy lad" and showed no sign of what was to come. According to psychiatrists, Copeland also had a higher than average IQ. One of the doctors believed his behaviour started to change around 1995 when he was 19, isolating himself from friends and family.

=== Political views ===
Copeland joined the far-right British National Party (BNP) in May 1997, at the age of 21. He acted as a steward at a BNP meeting, in the course of which he came into contact with the party's senior members and was photographed standing next to John Tyndall, the leader of the party at the time. During this period, Copeland read The Turner Diaries, and first learnt how to make bombs using fireworks with alarm clocks as timers after downloading the Anarchist Cookbook from the Internet. Copeland left the BNP in 1998, regarding it as insufficiently hardline because it was not willing to engage in paramilitary action, and joined the smaller National Socialist Movement, becoming its regional leader for Hampshire just weeks before the start of his bombing campaign. It was around this time that he visited his family doctor and was prescribed anti-depressants after telling the doctor he felt he was losing his mind.

=== Motivation ===
Copeland maintained he had worked alone and had not discussed his plans with anyone. During police interviews, he admitted holding neo-Nazi views and talked of his desire to spread fear and trigger a race war. He told police, "My main intent was to spread fear, resentment and hatred throughout this country; it was to cause a racial war." He said, "If you've read The Turner Diaries, you know the year 2000 there'll be the uprising and all that, racial violence on the streets. My aim was political. It was to cause a racial war in this country. There'd be a backlash from the ethnic minorities, then all the white people will go out and vote BNP."

After his arrest, Copeland wrote to BBC correspondent Graeme McLagan, denying that he had schizophrenia, and telling McLagan that the "Zog" or Zionist Occupation Government was pumping him full of drugs in order to sweep him under the carpet. He wrote, "I bomb the blacks, Pakis, degenerates. I would have bombed the Jews as well if I'd got a chance." Ryan writes that Copeland's first idea had been to bomb the Notting Hill Carnival after seeing images of the 1996 Atlanta Olympics bombing. When asked by police why he had targeted ethnic minorities, he replied, "Because I don't like them, I want them out of this country, I believe in the master race." Whilst on remand, Copeland also wrote to crime writer Bernard O'Mahoney, who posed as a woman called Patsy Scanlon in the hope of duping Copeland into confessing. According to The Independent, the letters helped secure a conviction by giving prosecutors evidence about Copeland's state of mind. In one letter to "Scanlon", Copeland wrote about how he was faking mental illness and was amazed by how many experts accepted his lies; the letter was included in the trial and greatly damaged the hopes of his defence team getting a manslaughter conviction based on extenuating circumstances.

=== Conviction ===
Copeland's mental state was assessed at Broadmoor Hospital. He was diagnosed by five psychiatrists as having paranoid schizophrenia, while one diagnosed a personality disorder not serious enough to avoid a charge of murder. There was no dispute that he was mentally ill, but the extent of this, and whether he was unable to take responsibility for his actions, became a matter of contention. At the Old Bailey, Copeland's plea of guilty to manslaughter on the grounds of diminished responsibility was not accepted by the prosecution or jury.

On 30 June 2000, Copeland was convicted of three counts of murder and planting bombs and given six life sentences. The trial judge doubted that it would ever be safe to release Copeland.

On 2 March 2007, the High Court decided that Copeland should remain in prison for at least fifty years, ruling out his release until 2049 at the earliest, when he would be 73. Copeland appealed; on 28 June 2011, the Court of Appeal upheld the ruling.

=== Further conviction ===
In June 2014, Copeland attacked a fellow inmate at HM Prison Belmarsh with a shiv, an improvised weapon made from razor blades attached to a toothbrush handle. In October 2015, he pleaded guilty to wounding with intent and was sentenced to a further three years in prison, of which he will serve eighteen months.

== Media ==
The events of the 1999 bombings were the topic of several media investigations. In 2000, Nick Lowles wrote Mr. Evil: The Secret Life of Pub Bomber and Killer David Copeland (John Blake, 2000; ISBN 9781857824162).

In early 2021, Netflix released the documentary Nail Bomber: Manhunt.
