= Demand-side =

The Demand side is a term used in economics to refer to a number of things:

- Demand, an element of a supply and demand partial equilibrium diagram in microeconomics
- Aggregate demand, in macroeconomics
- Demand-side economics, the opposite of supply-side economics
