= Demand-side economics =

Term in macroeconomic theory

Demand-side economics is a term used to describe the position that economic growth and full employment are most effectively created by high demand for products and services. According to demand-side economics, output is determined by effective demand. High consumer spending leads to business expansion, resulting in greater employment opportunities. Higher levels of employment create a multiplier effect that further stimulates aggregate demand, leading to greater economic growth.

Proponents of demand-side economics argue that tax breaks for the wealthy produce little, if any, economic benefit because most of the additional money is not spent on goods or services but is reinvested in an economy with low demand (which makes speculative bubbles likely). Instead, they argue increased governmental spending will help to grow the economy by spurring additional employment opportunities. They cite the lessons of the Great Depression of the 1930s as evidence that increased governmental spending spurs growth.

Demand-side economics traces its origins to British economist John Maynard Keynes. He argued there is no automatic stabilizing mechanism built into an economy, and that as a result state intervention is necessary to maintain output.

Demand-side economics is contrasted with supply-side economics.

== See also ==
- Fiscal policy
- Keynesian economics
- New Deal
- Obamanomics
- Public works
- Supply-side economics
- Trickle-up effect
- Universal Basic Income
