= Trickle-up economics =

Economic theory

Trickle-up economics (also known as bubble-up economics) is an economic policy proposition that final demand among a broad population can stimulate national income in an economy. The trickle-up effect posits that policies that directly benefit lower income individuals will boost the income of society as a whole, and thus those benefits will "trickle up" throughout the population. It is the opposite of trickle-down economics.

Paul Krugman referred to the principle behind the Obama administration's economic policies as trickle-up economics, while John R. Talbott used the term bottom-up economics. Biden's American Rescue Plan was also referred to as trickle up. Accompanying labeling differed from most trickle down labels in that both Obama's and Biden's approaches were characterized as spending heavy programs, rather than tax cuts in any particular tax bracket. At the same time, some criticisms of Obama's economic policy were labeled trickle up.
