= Economic policy of the Obama administration =

The economic policy of the Barack Obama administration, or in its colloquial portmanteau form "Obamanomics", was characterized by steep tax increases on higher income Americans designed to fund health care reform, reduce the federal budget deficit, and decrease income inequality.

President Obama's first term (2009–2013) included measures designed to address the Great Recession and subprime mortgage crisis, which began in 2007. These included a major stimulus package, banking regulation, and comprehensive healthcare reform. As the economy improved and job creation continued during his second term (2013–2017), the Bush tax cuts were allowed to expire for the highest income taxpayers and a spending sequester (cap) was implemented, to further reduce the deficit back to typical historical levels. The number of persons without health insurance was reduced by 20 million, reaching a record low level as a percent of the population.

By the end of his second term, the number of persons with jobs, real median household income, stock market, and real household net worth were all at record levels, while the unemployment rate was well below historical average.

== Overview ==
Obama presents his first weekly address as President of the United States on January 24, 2009, discussing the American Recovery and Reinvestment Act of 2009

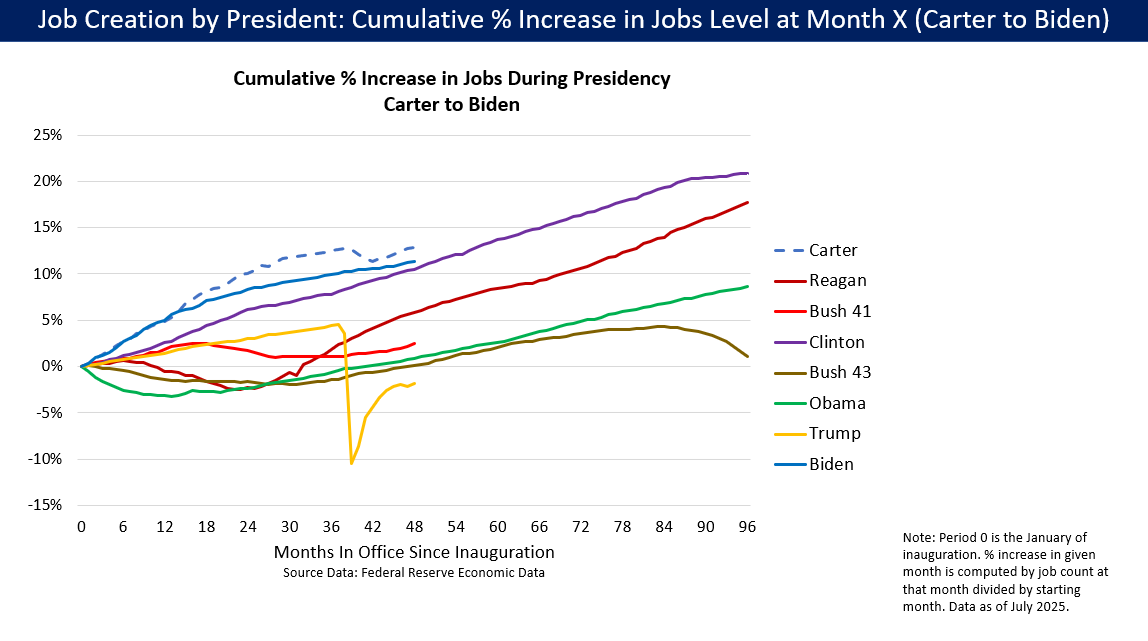
Job Growth by U.S. president, measured as cumulative percentage change from month after inauguration to end of term.

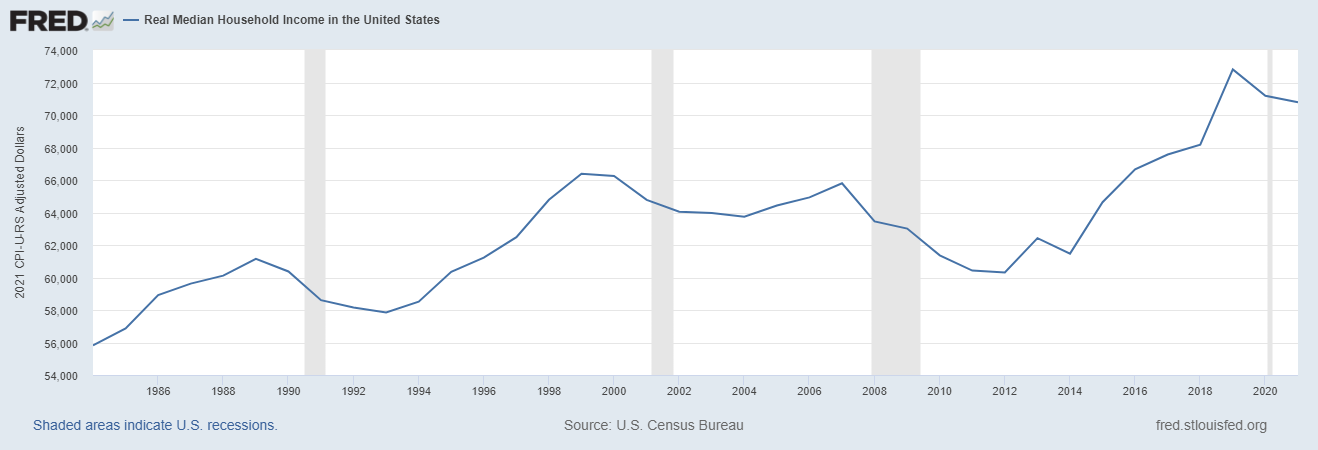
2016 was the first year U.S. real (inflation-adjusted) median household income surpassed 1999 levels.

President Obama was inaugurated in January 2009, in the depths of the Great Recession and a severe financial crisis that began in 2007. His administration continued the banking bailout and auto industry rescue begun by the previous administration and immediately enacted an $800 billion stimulus program, the American Recovery and Reinvestment Act of 2009 (ARRA), which included a blend of additional spending and tax cuts. By March 2010, the private sector began creating jobs consistently each month, a trend which continued through the end of his tenure, while public sector employment was slower to recover due to budget cuts.

President Obama followed with the 2010 Patient Protection and Affordable Care Act (ACA), commonly referred to as "Obamacare". By 2016, the law covered approximately 24 million people with health insurance via a combination of state healthcare exchanges and an extension of Medicaid. It lowered the rate of those without health insurance from approximately 16% in 2010 to 9% by 2015. Throughout his presidency, healthcare costs continued to moderate. For example, healthcare premiums for those covered by employers rose by 69% from 2000 to 2005, but only 27% from 2010 to 2015.

By 2017, nearly 70% of those on the ACA marketplace exchanges could purchase insurance for less than $75/month after subsidies. The ACA was evaluated multiple times by the Congressional Budget Office (CBO), which scored it as a moderate deficit reducer, as it included tax hikes primarily on high income taxpayers (roughly the top 5%) and reductions in future Medicare cost increases, offsetting subsidy costs. No Republicans in the House or Senate voted for the law.

To address the excesses in the banking sector that precipitated the crisis, Obama signed the 2010 Dodd–Frank Wall Street Reform and Consumer Protection Act. This law limited bank risk-taking and overhauled the outdated regulatory regime that was ineffective in monitoring the non-depository or shadow banking sector at the core of the crisis, which had outgrown the traditional depository banking sector. It also created the Consumer Financial Protection Bureau. However, it did not breakup the largest banks (which had grown even larger due to forced mergers during the crisis) or separate investment and depository banking, as the Glass-Steagal Act had done. Only a few Republicans in Congress voted for the law.

During his first two years, President Obama had a majority in the House and the Senate, which coincided with the 111th Congress, considered to have been one of the most productive Congresses in terms of legislation passed since the 89th Congress, during Lyndon Johnson's Great Society. However, in the November 2010 elections, the Republicans won the House majority and reduced the Democratic majority in the Senate. He faced either a split or Republican Congress thereafter, limiting his economic legislation to mainly budgetary matters.

The Great Recession had caused federal government revenues to fall to their lowest level relative to the size of the economy in 50 years. At the same time, safety net expenditures (including automatic stabilizers such as unemployment compensation and disability payments) and stimulus measures caused expenditures to rise considerably. This drove the budget deficit up, creating significant debt concerns. This resulted in a series of bruising debates with the Republican Congress.

President Obama signed the American Taxpayer Relief Act of 2012, which included the expiration of the Bush tax cuts for high income earners and implemented a sequester (cap) on spending for the military and other discretionary categories of spending. Compared against a baseline where the Bush tax cuts were allowed to expire on schedule in 2010 for all levels of income, it significantly increased future deficits. Compared against the prior years, it significantly reduced the deficit and limited future cost increases. This law and the recovering economy lowered the deficit back to the historical average relative to GDP by 2014.

With the economy recovering and major budget legislation behind him, President Obama began to shift to another priority, income and wealth inequality. From 1950 to 1979, the top 1% earned roughly a 10% share of the income. However, this had risen to 24% by 2007, due to a combination of globalization, automation, and policy changes that weakened worker's bargaining position relative to capital (owners). He referred to the widening income gap as the "defining challenge of our time" during 2013. His tax increases on higher-income taxpayers raised their effective tax rates starting in 2013, helping address after-tax income inequality, while job creation remained robust.

Wealth inequality had also risen similarly, with the share of wealth owned by the top 1% rising from 24% in 1979 to 36% by 2007. While U.S. household net worth rose nearly 30% from its pre-crisis peak in 2007 to 2016, much of this gain went to the wealthiest Americans, as it had prior to his tenure. By 2015, the share of wealth owned by the top 1% reached 42%.

President Obama also attempted to address inequality before taxes (i.e., market income), with infrastructure investment to create middle-class jobs and a federally-mandated increase in the minimum wage. While the latter was defeated by the Republican Congress, many states did increase their minimum wages, due in part to his support. During late 2015, the House and Senate, in rare bipartisan form, passed the largest infrastructure package in a decade, the Fixing America's Surface Transportation Act.

The cumulative changes in several economic variables from the start of his tenure in January 2009 to late 2016 were: Stock markets +180%; Corporate profits +112%; Auto sales +85%; Home prices +24%; Real GDP +15%; Number of jobs +8%; and number of Americans without health insurance -39%. While the annual federal deficit was down 58%, the national debt was up 88%.

== Responding to the Great Recession ==
Non-farm job creation averaged approximately 200,000/month for 73 months from October 2010 to October 2016, a robust rate by historical standards. The unemployment rate fell from 10% to less than 5%.

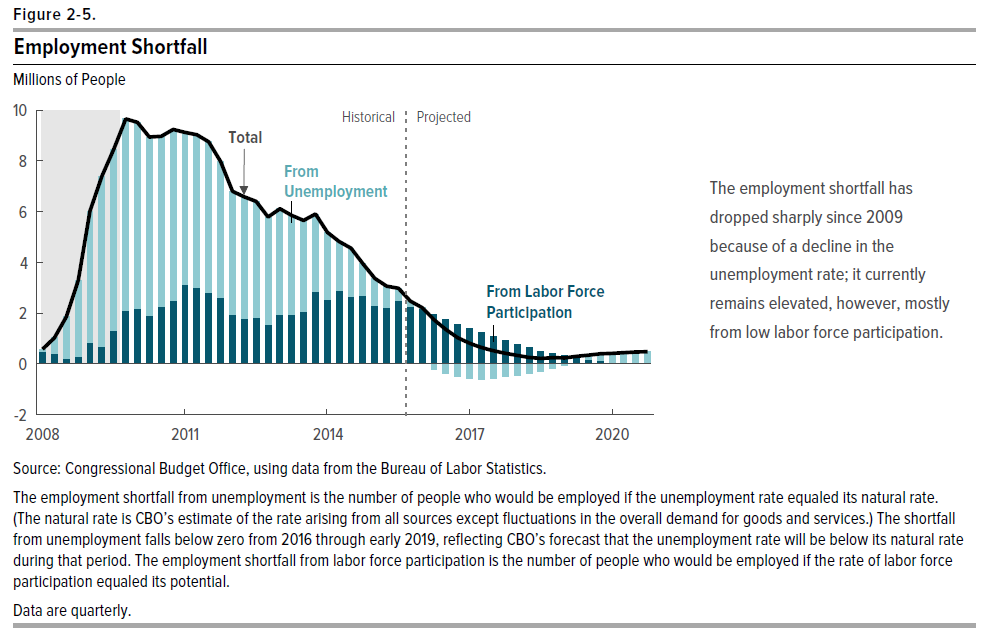
CBO explained that the shortfall in employment relative to a theoretical full employment level fell from nearly 10 million in 2010 to 1.6 million by late 2016. The shortfall was due to excess levels of unemployment and a decline in labor force participation.

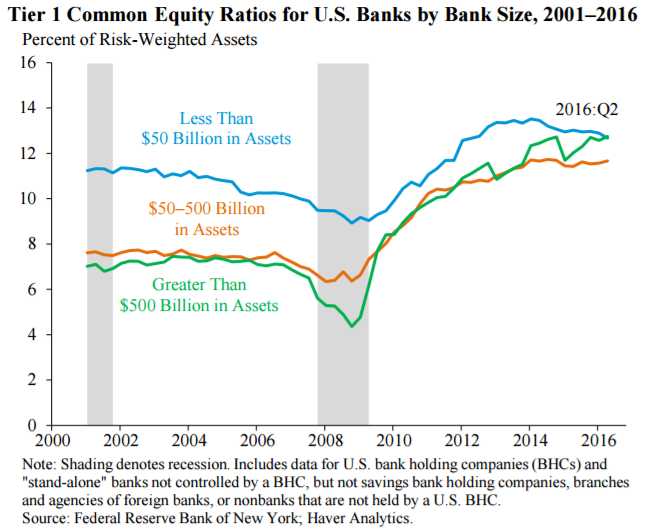
The tier 1 ratio represents the strength of the financial cushion that a bank maintains; the higher the ratio, the stronger the financial position of the bank, other things equal. Dodd–Frank set standards for improving this ratio and has been successful in that regard.

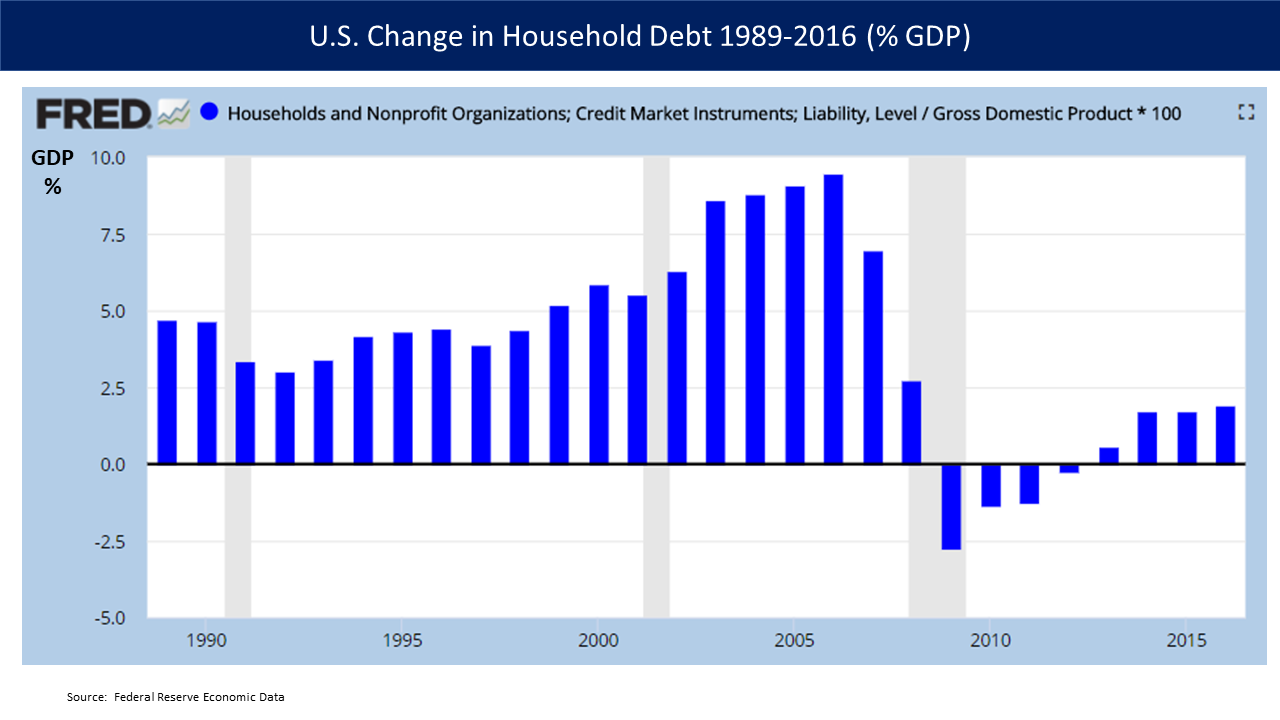
U.S. changes in household debt as a percentage of GDP for 1989–2016. Recoveries from financial crises tend to be protracted, as debt levels must be reduced before typical borrow-and-spend patterns are resumed. In this case, homeowners paid down debt from 2009 to 2012.

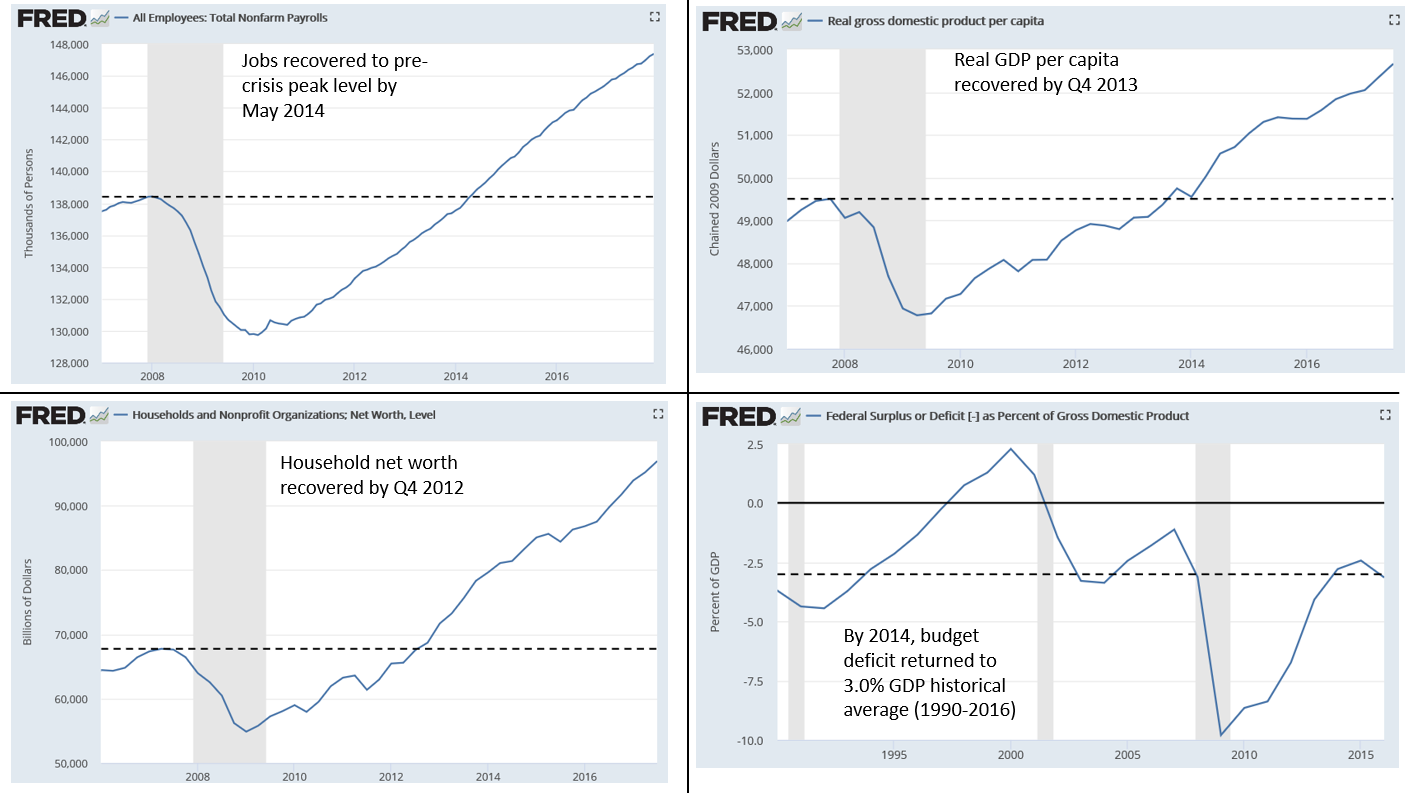
Several major U.S. economic variables had recovered from the 2007-2009 Subprime mortgage crisis and Great Recession by the 2013-2014 time period.

President Obama's first inauguration was held during the depths of the Great Recession. The situation was dire; the economy had lost nearly 3.6 million jobs in 2008 and was shedding jobs at a nearly 800,000 per month rate when he took office. During September 2008, several major financial institutions either collapsed, were forced into mergers, or were bailed out by the government. The financial system was nearly frozen, as the equivalent of a bank run on the essentially unregulated, non-depository shadow banking system was in progress. Ben Bernanke later stated that 12 of the 13 largest U.S. financial institutions were at risk of failure during the crisis.

The Bush Administration had passed the $700 billion Troubled Asset Relief Program in October 2008 and provided enormous loan guarantees to help strengthen the banks as late as January 2009 during the transition period. Further, the U.S. Federal Reserve under Ben Bernanke was taking a series of innovative emergency steps to inject money into the financial system, acting in their role as the "lender of last resort". Obama and Bernanke agreed that further action was also needed by Congress to help boost the economy beyond Wall Street.

=== Stimulus ===
On February 17, 2009, Obama signed into law the American Recovery and Reinvestment Act of 2009, a $787 billion economic stimulus package aimed at helping the economy recover from the deepening worldwide recession. The act increased federal spending by $573 billion for health care, infrastructure, education and social benefits, with the remainder used for tax relief — including a $116 billion income tax cut that benefited 95% of working families. Democrats overwhelmingly supported this measure, while only a few Senate Republicans supported the law.

The CBO estimated ARRA would positively impact GDP and employment, with primary impact between 2009 and 2011. It projected an increase in the GDP of between 1.4 and 3.8% by late 2009, 1.1 and 3.3% by late 2010, and 0.4 and 1.3% by late 2011, as well as a decrease of between zero and 0.2% beyond 2014. The impact to employment would be an increase of 0.8 million to 2.3 million by last-2009, an increase of 1.2 million to 3.6 million by late 2010, an increase of 0.6 million to 1.9 million by late 2011, and declining increases in subsequent years as the U.S. labor market reaches nearly full employment, but never negative. The CBO estimated that enacting the bill would increase federal budget deficits by $185 billion over the remaining months of fiscal year 2009, $399 billion in 2010, and $134 billion in 2011, or $787 billion over the 2009–2019 period.

The Congressional Budget Office and a broad range of economists credit Obama's stimulus plan for economic growth. The CBO's final analysis in February 2015 found that ARRA provided substantial improvement to GDP growth and employment.

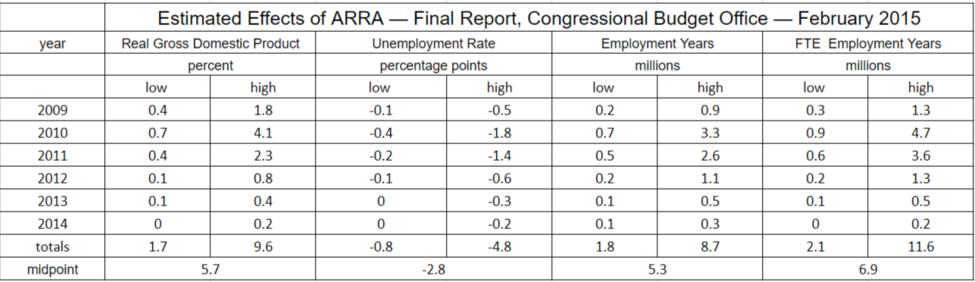
CBO final estimate of impact of Obama stimulus

Although an April 2010 survey of members of the National Association for Business Economics (NABE) showed an increase in job creation (over a similar January survey) for the first time in two years, 73% of the 68 respondents believed that the stimulus bill had no impact on employment at their company after one year of ARRA's enactment. The economy of the United States has grown faster than the other original NATO members by a wider margin under President Obama than it has anytime since the end of World War II. The OECD credits the much faster growth in the United States to the stimulus in the United States, in contrast to the austerity measures taken in the European Union.

The Council of Economic Advisers produced a comprehensive report on the ARRA in 2014, which includes a variety of graphics illustrating the positive effect on both GDP and jobs. It also covers the allocation of spending and tax cuts contained in the legislation.

=== U.S. automobile industry support ===
Obama intervened in the troubled automotive industry in March 2009, renewing loans for General Motors and Chrysler to continue operations while reorganizing. Over the following months, the White House set terms for both firms' bankruptcies, including the sale of Chrysler to Italian automaker Fiat and a reorganization of General Motors giving the U.S. government a temporary 60% equity stake in the company, with the Canadian government taking a 12% stake.

In June 2009, dissatisfied with the pace of economic stimulus, Obama called on his cabinet to accelerate the investment. By late 2013, the Federal Government had disposed of (re-privatized) all of its investments in Chrysler and GM. As of late 2016, taxpayers had recovered $71 billion of the $80 billion invested in the automobile industry.

According to a study by the Center for Automotive Research, the bailout saved 2.63 million jobs and saved or avoided the loss of $105 billion in transfer payments and the loss of personal and social insurance tax collection. Auto and light truck production pre-crisis of 2007 was 16.0 million units, fell to 10.4 million units at the trough of the Great Recession in 2009, then steadily rebounded to 18.3 million by December 2016. He also signed into law the Car Allowance Rebate System program, also known as "Cash for Clunkers".

=== Trends in employment ===
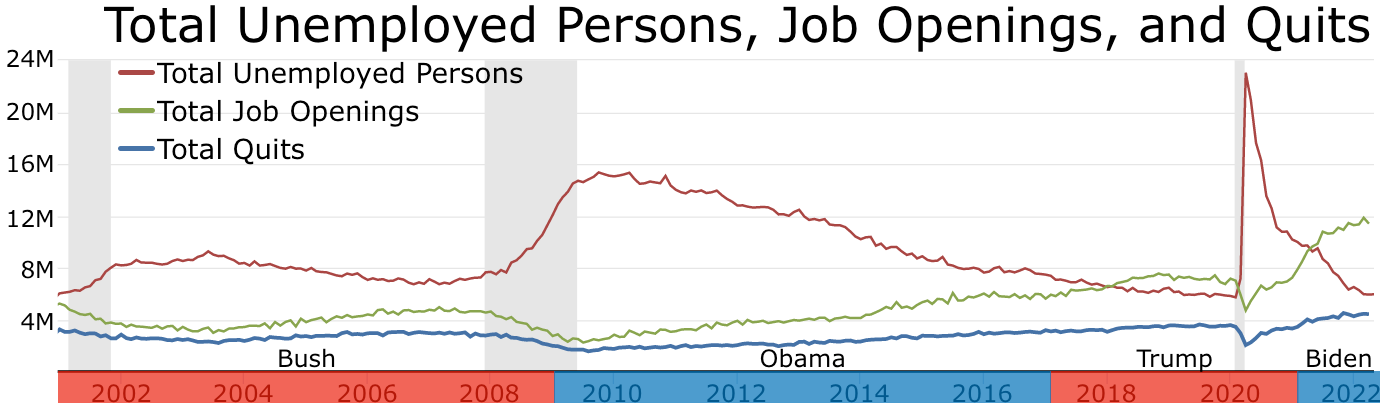
Total unemployed people Total job openings Quits rate Republican President Democratic President

Approximately 8.7 million private sector jobs were lost between January 2008 and February 2010 due to the Great Recession. The unemployment rate (U-3) began rising from 4.7% in November 2007 and peaked at 10.0% in October 2009 as the crisis deepened, approximately where it remained until November 2010. Another measure of unemployment (U-6), which includes workers marginally attached to the labor force and those employed part-time for economic reasons, rose from 8.4% in November 2007 and peaked at 17.1% in November 2009, approximately where it remained until November 2010. Thereafter, it began a steady decline until reaching 9.4% in January 2017.

Measured from the month following his inauguration in January 2009, the U.S. added 11.6 million private sector jobs from February 2009 to January 2017. Measured from the crisis trough in February 2010, the U.S. added a total of 16.1 million private sector jobs over the remaining 83 months of the Obama presidency — the longest continuous period of private sector job creation on record. By comparison, no net jobs were added during the 2000–2009 period including the crisis impact, while 18 to 22 million jobs were added each decade from 1970 to 1999.

Non-farm job creation averaged approximately 200,000/month for 73 months from October 2010 to October 2016, a robust rate by historical standards. For example, job creation per month averaged 236,000 (Clinton), 209,000 (Carter), 167,000 (Reagan), 50,000 (G. H. W. Bush), and 13,000 (G. W. Bush).

The 2017 Economic Report of the President stated, "Nonfarm job growth turned consistently positive beginning in October 2010. Since then, the U.S. economy has added jobs for 74 straight months, the longest streak of total job growth on record; over this period, nonfarm employment growth has averaged 199,000 jobs a month. Total nonfarm employment recovered to its pre-recession peak in 2014—the best year for job creation since the 1990s—and, as of November 2016, exceeded its pre-recession peak by 6.7 million jobs."

The Congressional Budget Office (CBO) estimated the size of an employment shortfall, defined as the number of workers below a full employment level. This shortfall steadily improved during Obama's tenure, from approximately 10 million in 2010 to 2.5 million as of December 2015, a figure roughly 1.5% of the 160 million person labor force. As the economy recovered towards full employment, a reduced labor force participation rate among prime working-aged persons (between ages 25 to 54 years old) accounted for a greater share of the shortfall. The overall labor force participation rate had been falling since 2000, as the country ages.

In December 2015, the Bureau of Labor Statistics (BLS) reported the reasons why persons aged 16 years or older were outside the labor force, using the 2014 figure of 87.4 million: 1) Retired: 38.5 million or 44%; 2) Disabled or Illness: 16.3 million or 19%; 3) Attending School: 16.0 million or 18%; 4) Home Responsibilities: 13.5 million or 15%; and 4) Other Reasons: 3.1 million or 5%. As of November 2016, BLS estimated that 90 million of the 95 million people outside the labor force indicated they "do not want a job now."

During the Obama presidency, critics asserted that his policies (particularly the ACA) were destroying full-time employment and creating "Obama's Part-Time America". However, from the month ACA was enacted in March 2010 to the end of the Obama presidency, full-time employment increased 12.5%, voluntary part-time employment (those who normally seek part-time work) declined 1.0%, and involuntary part-time employment (those who want full-time work but must settle for part-time) declined 35.4%.

=== Banking regulation ===
To address the excesses in the banking sector that precipitated the crisis, Obama signed into law the Dodd–Frank Wall Street Reform and Consumer Protection Act of 2010, which limited bank risk-taking and overhauled the outdated regulatory regime that was ineffective in monitoring the non-depository or shadow banking sector at the core of the crisis, which had outgrown the traditional depository banking sector. It also created the Consumer Financial Protection Bureau (CFPB). However, it did not breakup the largest banks (which had grown even larger due to forced mergers during the crisis) or separate investment and depository banking, as the Glass-Steagal Act had done. Nearly all Congressional Democrats but only a few Republicans voted for the law. On December 10, 2014, the President himself, together with JP Morgan's Jamie Dimon, helped whip House votes in favor of the "cromnibus" spending bill, which included a provision that progressive lawmakers argued would significantly weaken the Dodd-Frank regulations.

=== Recovery ===
The Great Recession of 2007-2009 was different in kind from all the recessions since the Great Depression, as it also involved a banking crisis and the de-leveraging (debt reduction) of highly indebted households. Research indicates recovery from financial crises can be protracted, with lengthy periods of high unemployment and substandard economic growth. Economist Carmen Reinhart stated in August 2011: "Debt de-leveraging [reduction] takes about seven years ... And in the decade following severe financial crises, you tend to grow by 1 to 1.5 percentage points less than in the decade before, because the decade before was fueled by a boom in private borrowing, and not all of that growth was real. The unemployment figures in advanced economies after falls are also very dark. Unemployment remains anchored about five percentage points above what it was in the decade before."

Several key economic variables (e.g., Job level, real GDP per capita, household net worth, and the federal budget deficit) hit their low point (trough) in 2009 or 2010, after which they began to turn upward, recovering to pre-recession (2007) levels between late 2012 and May 2014, which marked the recovery of all jobs lost during the recession. Real median household income fell to a trough of $53,331 in 2012, but recovered to an all-time high of $59,039 by 2016.

The Great Recession had a particularly severe effect on state and local tax receipts, causing many states and localities to reduce spending and employment to balance budgets as mandated by their constitutions or statutes. This government contraction subtracted from real GDP growth, creating an economic drag, rather than government adding to real GDP as is typical. Obama noted this in June 2012, saying, "The private sector is doing fine. Where we're seeing weaknesses in our economy have to do with state and local government -- oftentimes, cuts initiated by governors or mayors who are not getting the kind of help that they have in the past from the federal government and who don't have the same kind of flexibility as the federal government in dealing with fewer revenues coming in."

== Healthcare reform ==
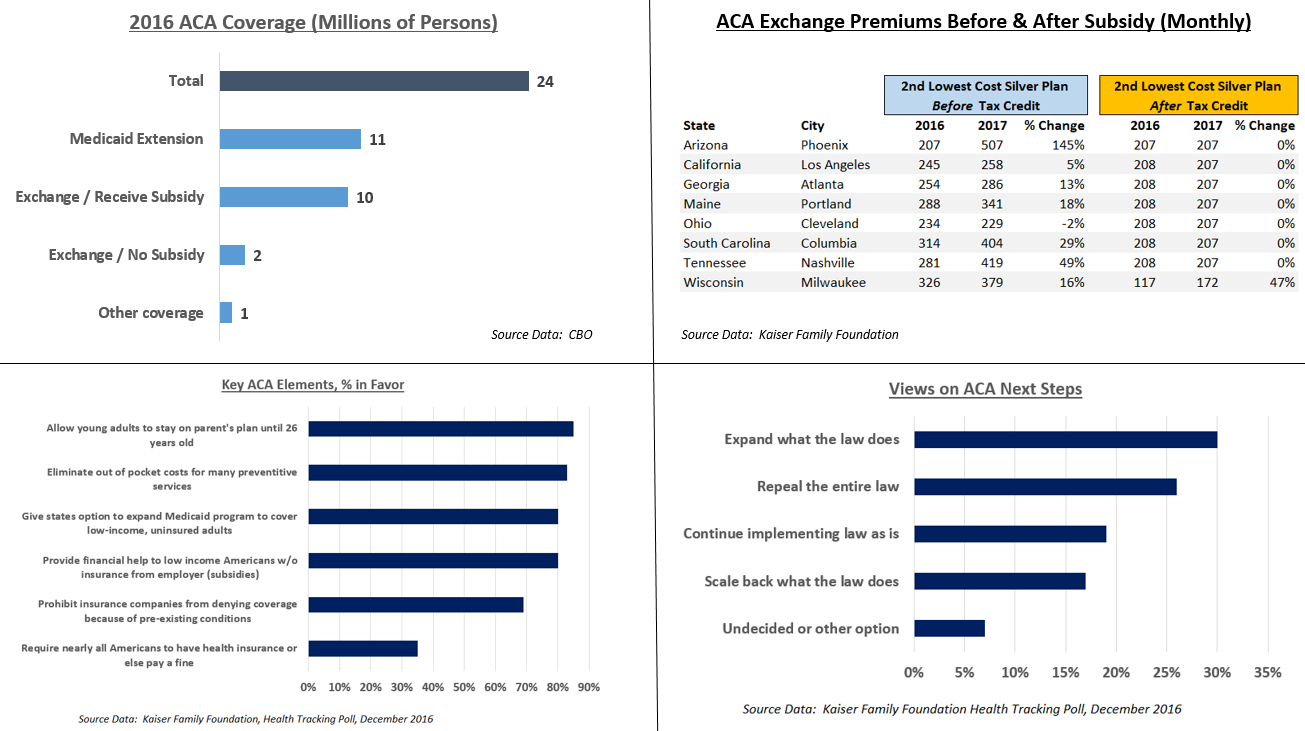
This chart illustrates several aspects of the Affordable Care Act, including number of persons covered, cost before and after subsidies, and public opinion.

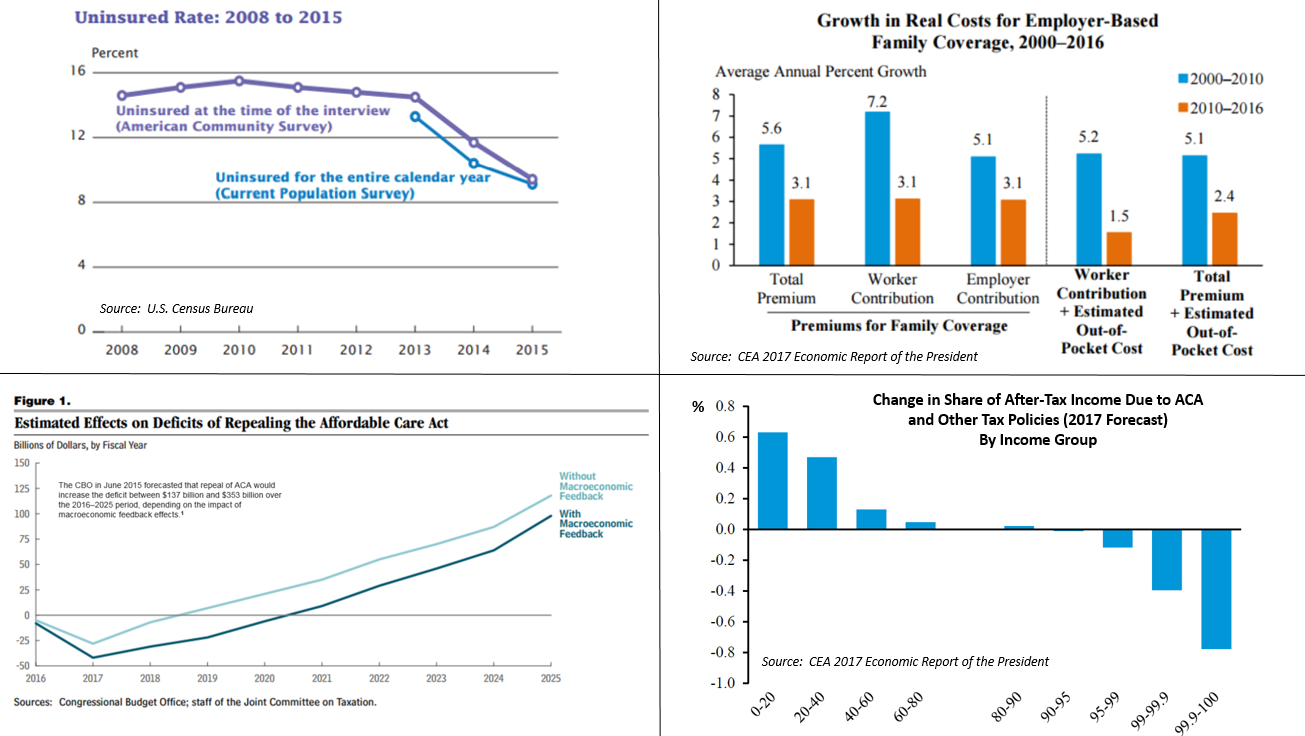
Coverage rate, employer market cost trends, budgetary impact, and income inequality aspects of the Affordable Care Act.

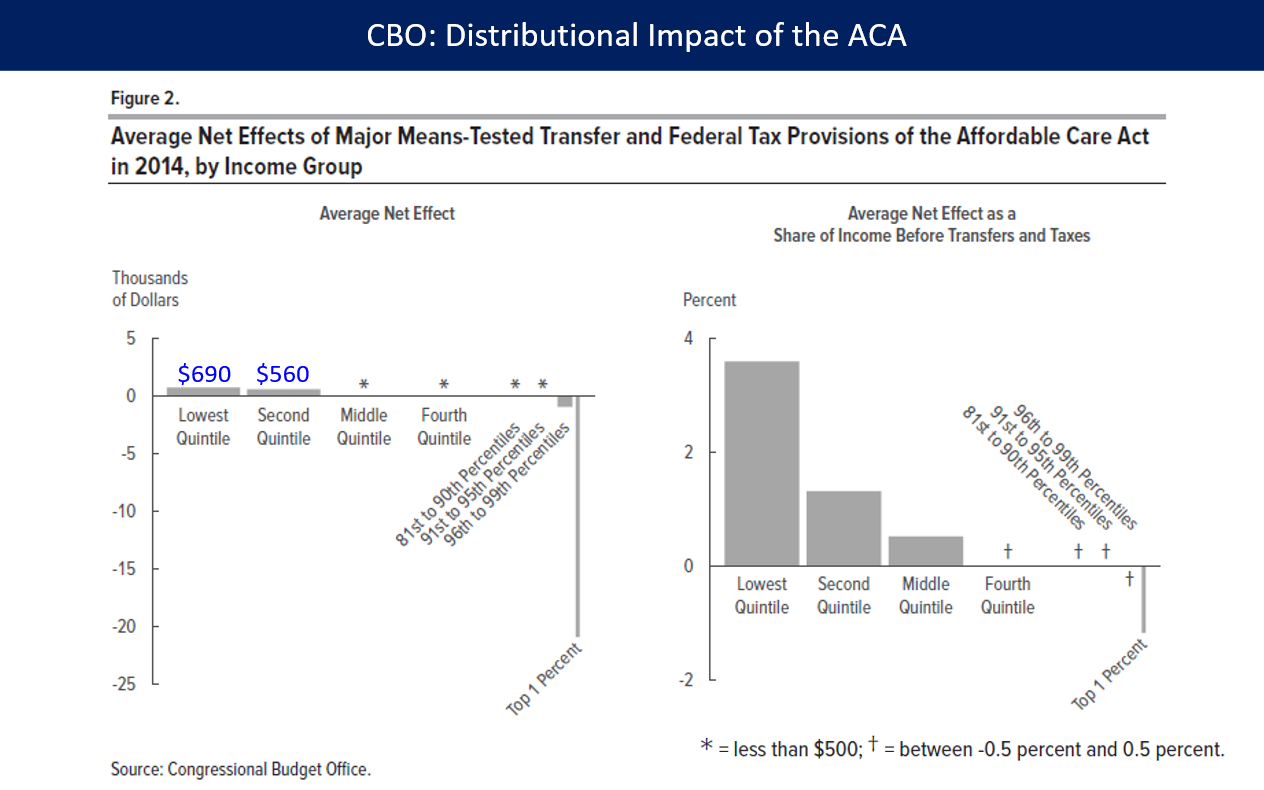
The distributional impact of the Affordable Care Act (ACA or Obamacare) during 2014. The ACA raised taxes mainly on the top 1% to fund approximately $600 in benefits on average for the bottom 40% of families.

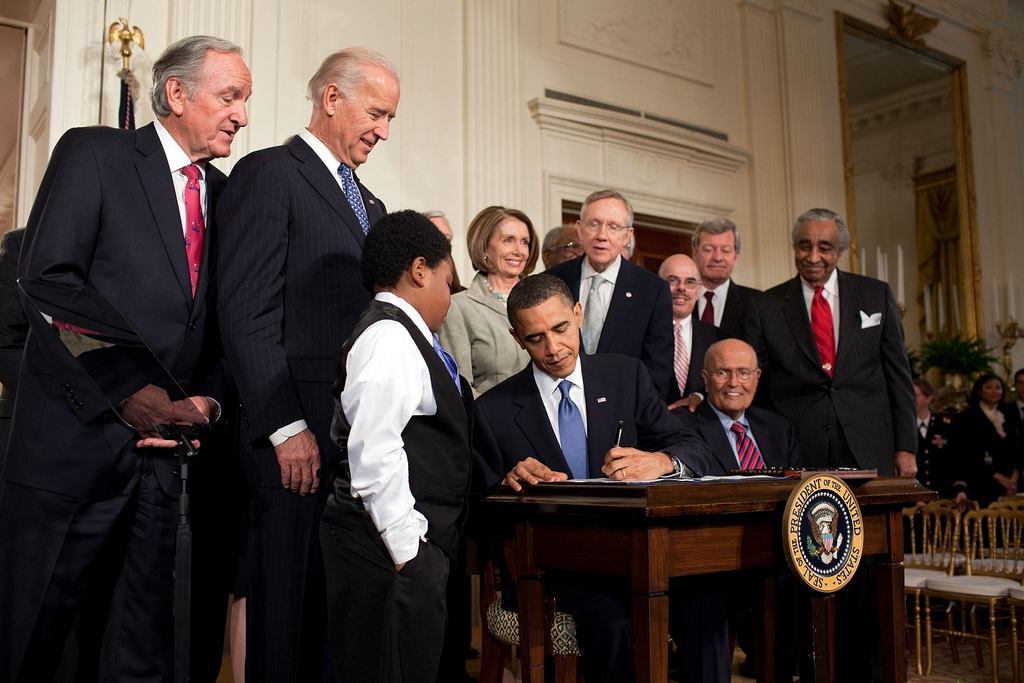
President Obama signing the Affordable Care Act into law.

President Obama followed with the legislation that informally bears his name ("Obamacare"), the Affordable Care Act of 2010. It was built on three related concepts: 1) Subsidies for low-income persons to help them purchase health insurance; 2) Guaranteed issue and community rating, meaning persons with pre-existing medical conditions could not be discriminated against; and 3) Coverage requirements, enforced via both individual and employer "mandates" with financial incentives supporting them, to ensure healthy people (with few medical bills) would participate to help keep insurance costs down for all.

While the law received no Republican Congressional support, it was conceptually similar to the healthcare plan developed by The Heritage Foundation during the late 1980s and Romneycare. Healthcare historian Paul Starr said in December 2017, "If you trace the origins of the ideas in the ACA, it was basically a bi-partisan bill passed on strictly partisan lines."

By creating state-level marketplaces or exchanges, enough people could form pools to obtain cost-effective coverage. Furthermore, the law provided federal funding for states that chose to expand their Medicaid programs. The vast majority of congressional Democrats voted for the law, while no Republicans in the House or Senate did so. Republicans, mainly in the House of Representatives, attempted on as many as 60 occasions to repeal, defund, or delay the law during Obama's tenure, but to no avail.

=== Coverage ===
By 2016, the law covered approximately 24 million people with health insurance via a combination of state healthcare exchanges and funding for the state-level expansion of Medicaid to more people. It lowered the rate of those without health insurance from approximately 16% in 2010 to 9% by 2015. Poltifact cited various estimates that only about 2% of the total insured population (4 million out of 262 million) received notices that substandard policies would have to be changed, even though Obama was roundly criticized for claims that "if you like your health plan, you can keep it."

However, despite federal financial incentives to do so, many states with Republican governors chose not to expand Medicaid to their residents under the ACA, which adversely affected coverage for lower-income citizens while reducing costs. According to the Urban Institute, those states that expanded Medicaid (32 of them, including Washington, D.C.) had a 7.3% uninsured rate in the first quarter of 2016, while those that did not (19 states) had a 14.1% uninsured rate among adults between the ages of 18 and 64 years old.

=== Healthcare costs ===
Throughout his tenure, healthcare costs continued to moderate. For example, healthcare premiums for those covered by employers rose by 69% from 2000 to 2005, but only by 27% from 2010 to 2015. To put these trends into perspective, the 2017 Economic Report of the President stated,

Because of slow growth in costs in employer coverage...the average costs for a family with employer-based coverage in 2016 were $4,400 below where they would have been had costs grown at their pace over the decade before the ACA became law.

While these slower cost increases began before the ACA, they continued or further improved after its implementation.

The ACA also provided subsidies to help lower-income families afford insurance. By 2017, nearly 70% of those on the exchanges could purchase insurance for less than $75/month after subsidies. CBO estimated that subsidies paid under the law in 2016 averaged $4,240 per person for 10 million people receiving them, roughly $42 billion. For scale, the subsidy for the employer market, in the form of exempting from taxation those health insurance premiums paid on behalf of employees by employers, was approximately $1,700 per person in 2016, or $266 billion for the 155 million persons in the employer market. The employer market subsidy was not changed by the law.

=== Budgetary impact ===
The law was evaluated multiple times by the Congressional Budget Office (CBO), which scored it as a moderate deficit reducer, as it included tax hikes primarily on high income taxpayers (over $200,000 roughly the Top 5%) and reductions in future Medicare cost increases, offsetting subsidy costs. The CBO also reported in June 2015 that, "Including the budgetary effects of macroeconomic feedback, repealing the ACA would increase federal budget deficits by $137 billion over the 2016–2025 period." CBO also estimated that excluding the effects of macroeconomic feedback, repeal of the ACA would increase the deficit by $353 billion over that same period.

The 2017 Economic Report of the President also stated that ACA has improved healthcare quality, saying

Since 2010, the rate at which patients are harmed while seeking hospital care has fallen by 21 percent, which is estimated to have led to approximately 125,000 avoided deaths through 2015. Payment incentives created in the ACA have also driven a substantial decline in the rate at which patients return to hospital after discharge, corresponding to an estimated 565,000 avoided readmissions from April 2010 through May 2015.

=== Public opinion ===
According to Gallup, the overall popularity of the law fell and then improved during Obama's tenure, but more disapproved of it (52%) than approved of it (44%) as of November 2016. Popularity was divided along party lines, with Democrats having a much more favorable view of the law. Individual elements were considerably more popular than the law overall, even though the mandate requiring people to have insurance remained highly unpopular.

== Control of Congress ==
During his first two years, President Obama had a majority in the House and filibuster-proof super-majority in the Senate (until February 2010), which coincided with the 111th United States Congress, considered to have been one of the most productive Congresses in terms of legislation passed since the 89th Congress, during Lyndon Johnson's Great Society. However, in the November 2010 elections, the Republicans won the House majority and reduced the Democratic majority in the Senate.

The 112th United States Congress (January 2011 to January 2013) was able to block many of President Obama's other legislative plans, resulting in one of the least productive Congresses since World War 2, with record low approval ratings. Obama faced a highly unpopular split or Republican Congress thereafter. According to a Gallup Poll released in August 2014, the 113th Congress had the highest disapproval rating of any Congress since 1974, when data first started being collected: 83% of Americans surveyed said that they disapproved of the job Congress was doing, while only 13% said that they approved. The 112th and later Congresses limited Obama's legislative accomplishments to primarily budgetary matters.

== The federal budget debates ==
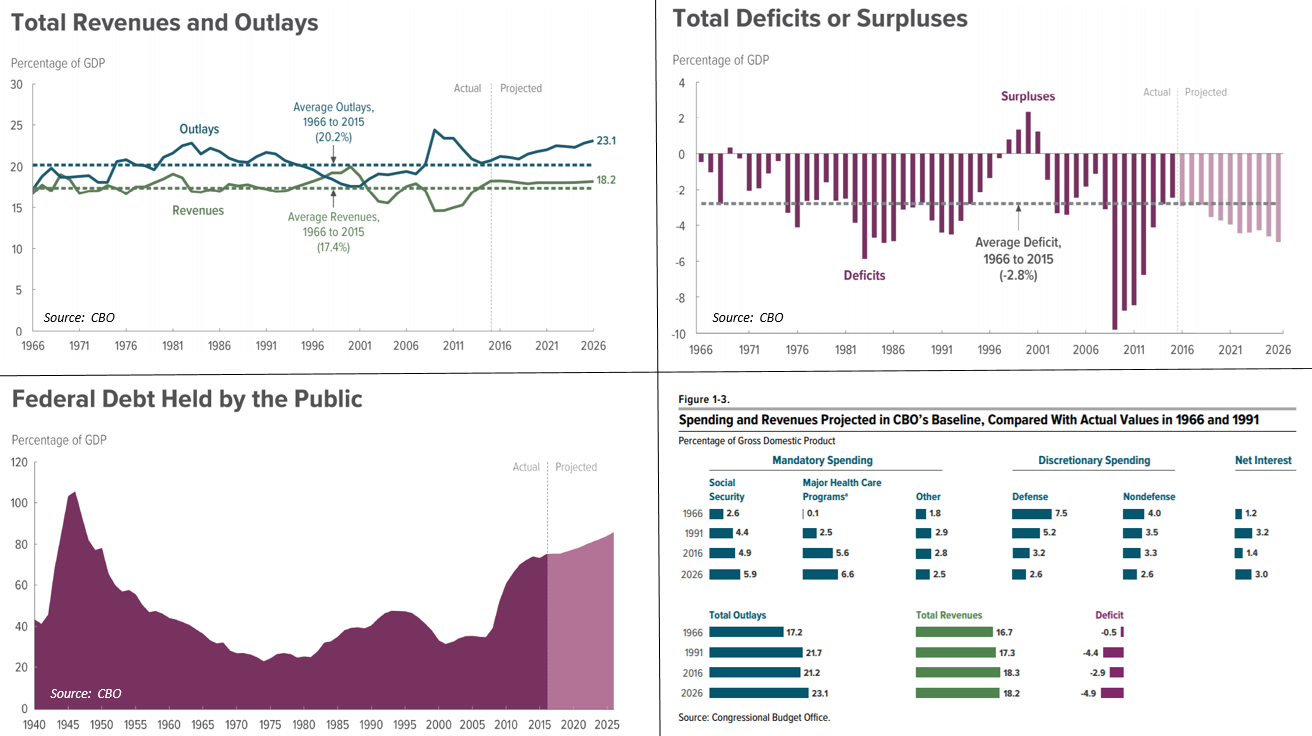
Four CBO charts with revenue, spending, deficit and debt information. The annual budget deficit fell significantly during the Obama administration, although debt relative to the size of the economy increased.

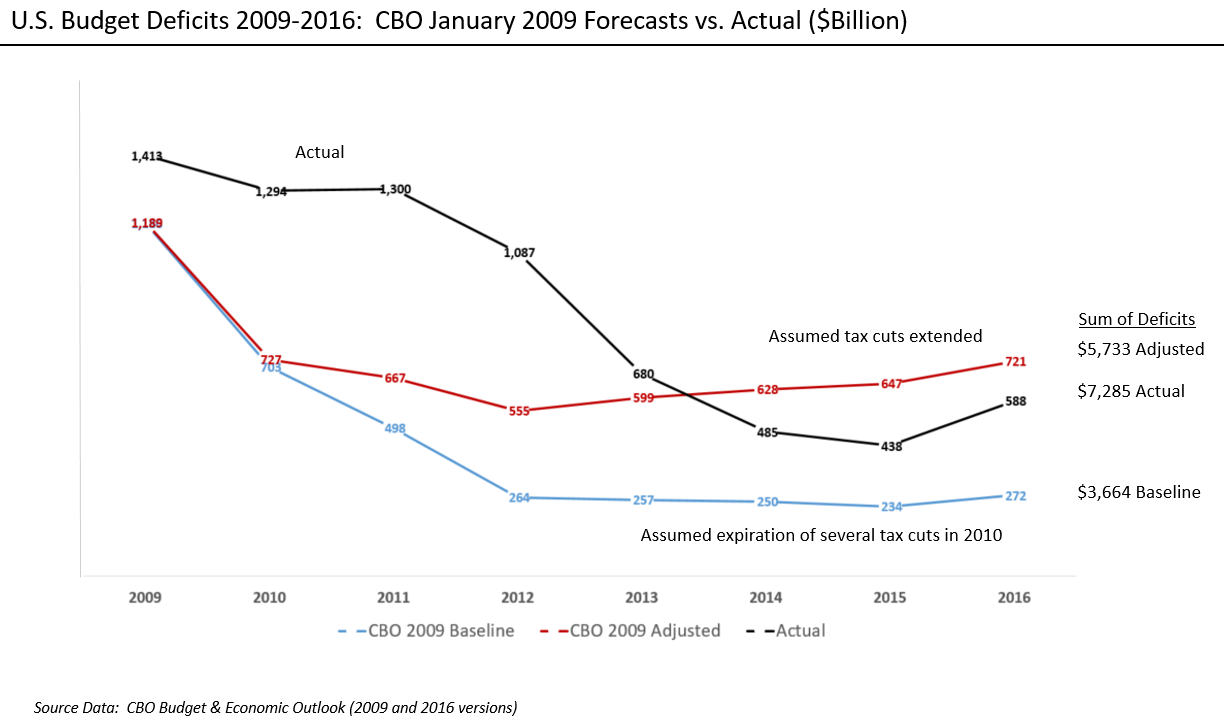
Comparison of CBO 2009 deficit forecasts versus actual results 2009–2016. The deficit was cut by nearly two-thirds, falling from $1.4 trillion in FY2009 to below $500 billion by FY2014. Relative to the size of the economy, it fell each year 2010–2015.

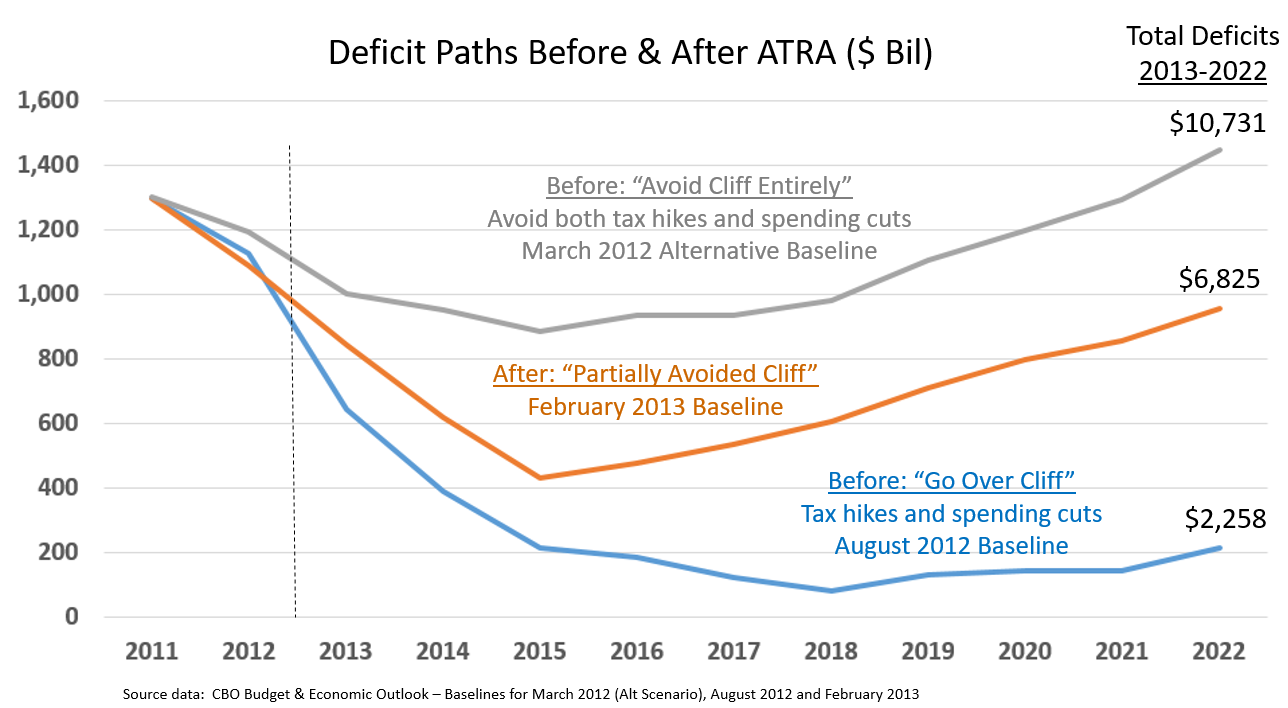
Three CBO deficit scenarios related to the American Taxpayer Relief Act of 2012 (ATRA) and the Fiscal Cliff. The blue line (August 2012 baseline) was the "current law" baseline, with tax increases and spending cuts that would take effect if laws were not changed. The grey line (March 2012 alternative baseline) was the "current policy" baseline, which represented the avoidance of the tax increases and spending cuts. The orange line (February 2013 baseline) was the post-ATRA result. The vertical black dotted line is the January 2013 date of enactment.

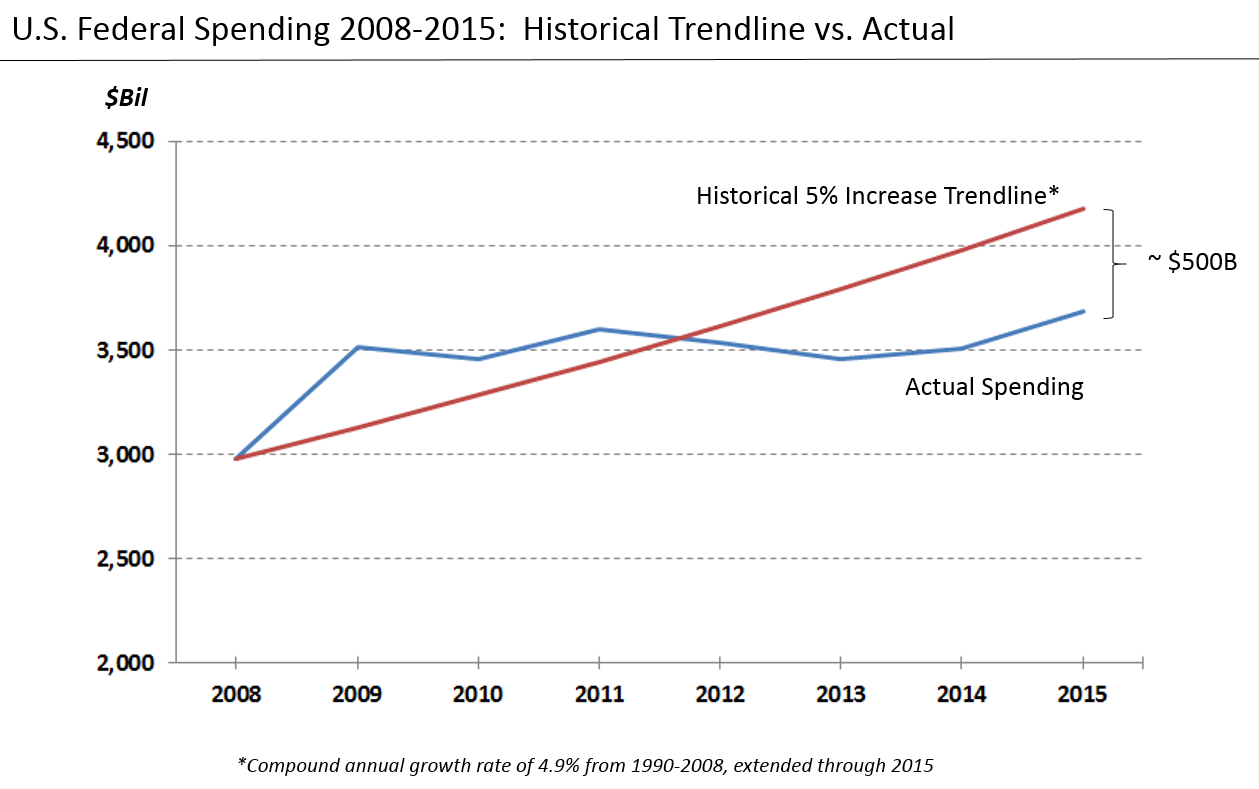
Comparison of actual U.S. Federal Spending 2008–2015 versus a trend line based on the 5% average annual increase in 1990–2008. Spending was below the trend line starting in 2012.

The Great Recession had caused federal government revenues to fall to their lowest level relative to the size of the economy for 50 years, with tax revenues falling nearly $400 billion (20%) between 2008 and 2009. At the same time, safety net spending caused expenditures to rise considerably. For example, automatic stabilizer spending (such as unemployment compensation, food stamps, and disability payments, which increased without legislative action) ranged between $350–420 billion annually from 2009 to 2012, roughly 10% of the expenditures. The combination of higher outlays and lower receipts drove the budget deficit up even without any policy steps by President Obama, creating significant debt concerns. This resulted in a series of bruising debates with the Republican Congress, which attempted (with much success) to blame the President for the deficits caused primarily by the recession that began during the Bush administration.

One incident illustrates the nature and tensions of the debate. The U.S. added $1.0 trillion to the national debt in fiscal year (FY) 2008, which ended in September 2008. The Congressional Budget Office projected two weeks prior to Obama's first inauguration that the deficit in FY 2009 (a year budgeted by President Bush) would be $1.2 trillion and that the debt increase over the following decade would be $3.1 trillion assuming the expiration of the Bush tax cuts as scheduled in 2010, or around $6.0 trillion if the Bush tax cuts were extended at all income levels. Adjusting other assumptions in the CBO baseline could have raised that debt level even higher.

In response to Republican criticism, President Obama claimed,

The fact of the matter is that when we came into office, the deficit was $1.3 trillion [for FY 2009]...[with] $8 trillion worth of debt [projected] over the next decade.

a claim which Politifact rated as "Mostly True". President Obama had pledged not to raise taxes except on high income taxpayers, so his debt figure included the extension of the Bush tax cuts for most taxpayers. These facts did not stop Republicans from blaming the President for the ensuing debts during his administration.

The Balance used three scenarios for describing the debt addition during the Obama Administration:

1. Debt added from when Obama was inaugurated January 20, 2009 ($10.6 trillion) to when he left office on January 20, 2017 ($20.0 trillion), an increase of $9.4 trillion. This calculation simply compares two points in time and does not analyze cause.
2. Sum of the annual deficits in fiscal years budgeted by Obama (fiscal years 2010 to 2017), which totaled $6.5 trillion using the CBO historical tables. This also does not analyze cause.
3. Measuring the debt added by Obama's policies, primarily the extension of the Bush tax cuts ($860 billion) and the ARRA stimulus ($800 billion).

Within a month of the 2010 midterm elections, Obama announced a compromise deal with the Congressional Republican leadership that included a temporary, two-year extension of the 2001 and 2003 income tax rates, a one-year payroll tax reduction, continuation of unemployment benefits, and a new rate and exemption amount for estate taxes. The compromise overcame opposition from some in both parties, and the resulting $858 billion Tax Relief, Unemployment Insurance Reauthorization, and Job Creation Act of 2010 passed with bipartisan majorities in both houses of Congress before Obama signed it on December 17, 2010.

=== Debt ceiling crises ===
On August 2, 2011, after a lengthy congressional debt limit debate, Obama signed into law the bipartisan Budget Control Act of 2011, which enforced limits on discretionary spending until 2021 (the "sequester"), established a procedure to increase the debt limit, created a Congressional Joint Select Committee on Deficit Reduction to propose further deficit reduction with a stated goal of achieving at least $1.5 trillion in budgetary savings over 10 years, and established automatic procedures for reducing spending by as much as $1.2 trillion if legislation originating with the new joint select committee does not achieve such savings.

By passing the legislation, the U.S. was able to prevent a U.S. government default on its obligations, as Congressional Republicans had initially refused to raise the debt ceiling. President Obama referred to the situation as a "manufactured crisis", while Senate Minority Leader Mitch McConnell called it "a new template...[raising] the debt ceiling will not be clean anymore." The Republicans attempted to use the debt limit as a bargaining chip again in 2013, resulting in another debt ceiling crisis, which was resolved with minor legislation.

=== Tax policy ===
President Obama pledged before he was elected not to raise taxes except on those couples earning over $250,000 (200,000 for individuals). With the Bush tax cuts extension scheduled to expire in January 2013, Obama had significant leverage with the Republican Congress, as his veto of further extensions would have resulted in a sizable income tax increase across the income spectrum, a significant expansion of government, but contrary to his pledge. His compromise, the American Taxpayer Relief Act of 2012 (ATRA), passed by a wide majority in the Senate, with both Democrats and Republicans supporting it, while a majority of Republicans in the House opposed it. It extended the Bush tax cuts for roughly the bottom 99% of income earners (those earning below $400,000, or $450,000 for married couples).

Capital gains, dividends, and estate tax rates were also increased relative to the 2003–2012 levels; these also mainly affect high-income and wealthy households. It was estimated to increase revenues by $600 billion over a decade, roughly one-fifth of the amount if the tax cuts had been allowed to expire at all income levels. Stated another way, it extended roughly 80% of the Bush tax cuts indefinitely. Separately enacted as part of Obamacare, individual mandates and tobacco taxes impacted the middle class slightly, although they were mainly designed to adjust behavior rather than gather revenue.

ATRA reduced the deficit trajectory significantly relative to the CBO "Alternative baseline" or "current policy" baseline of March 2012, which projected $10.7 trillion in deficit increases (debt) over the 2013-2022 decade. That baseline assumed the Bush tax cuts and other tax cuts would again be extended at all levels and that the discretionary spending sequester negotiated as part of the Budget Control Act of 2011 would not be implemented. The February 2013 (post ATRA) CBO baseline had deficit increases of $6.8 trillion over a decade, so ATRA reduced these deficits by approximately $3.9 trillion relative to current policies. However, measured another way, relative to the CBO August 2012 "current law baseline" (which assumed deficits would total $2.3 trillion over a decade via the expiration of the Bush tax cuts at all levels, several other tax increases, and implementation of the sequester) ATRA raised the deficit by $4.5 trillion. The CBO had forecast that cutting the deficit towards the current law baseline would have a significant risk of recession in 2013 along with higher unemployment, so a more moderate trajectory was chosen by the President and Congress.

=== Trends in deficits and debt ===
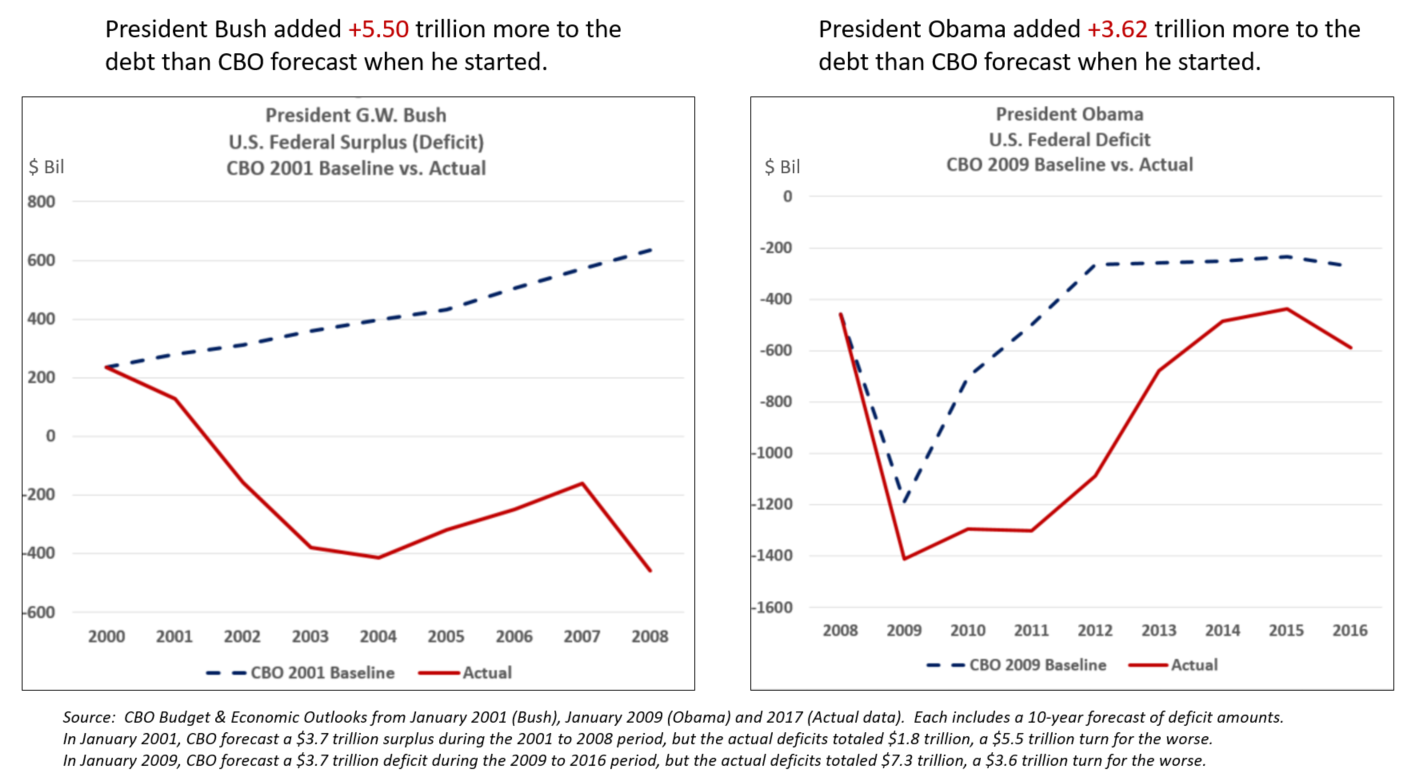
Comparison of annual federal deficits (CBO 10-year forecast from prior to inauguration vs. the actual amount), during the Obama and G.W. Bush presidencies. Bush added far more to the debt relative to the CBO 2001 forecast than Obama added relative to the CBO 2009 forecast.

Federal spending increased significantly from $3.0 trillion in FY2008 to $3.5 trillion in FY 2009, the last fiscal year budgeted by President Bush. This increase was mainly driven by the Great Recession, with significant increases in automatic stabilizers such as unemployment insurance and food stamps. Spending then roughly stabilized at that dollar level through 2015. For instance, 2014 spending of $3,506B was slightly below the 2009 level of $3,517B. Throughout 2015, the U.S. federal government spent $3.7 trillion, around the historical average relative to the size of the economy at 20.7% GDP. Projecting 2008 spending forward at the historical 5% rate, by 2015 federal spending was $500 billion below trend. Spending rose to $4.0 trillion or 20.8% GDP in FY2017, the last year budgeted by President Obama.

The budget deficit reached 9.8% GDP in 2009 in the depths of the recession, before steadily recovering to below the 3.0% GDP historical average (1970-2013) in 2014 (2.8% GDP) and 2015 (2.4% GDP). Federal spending per person rose approximately from $9,800 in 2008 to $11,440 in 2009 mainly due to the Great Recession, then declined somewhat (the first reduction since 1960) and remained relatively flat through 2015 at $11,480. It rose steadily thereafter to $12,217 in FY2017.

The national debt increased from $10.0 trillion in September 2008 to $19.6 trillion in September 2016. As described above, roughly $3 trillion of this increase was anticipated in the January 2009 CBO baseline forecast, or $6–8 trillion adjusting for the extension of the Bush tax cuts and other baseline overrides typically legislated. Obama ultimately extended the Bush tax cuts for approximately 98% of taxpayers as part of the American Taxpayer Relief Act of 2012, allowing taxes to rise on the top 1–2% of income earners. This extension represented about 80% of the dollar value of the tax cuts. The debt held by the public (which excludes intra-governmental liabilities like the Social Security Trust Fund) rose from around 36% GDP in 2009 to 76% GDP in 2016, the highest level except for the post World War 2 era.

Upon taking office, the Obama administration eliminated four budgeting gimmicks the Bush administration had used to underestimate deficits, causing reported deficits to increase by $2.7 trillion over the coming decade.

=== Summary of major budgetary legislation ===
President Obama signed four key laws that significantly impacted the level of revenue and spending:

1. The American Recovery and Reinvestment Act of 2009, an $800 billion stimulus spending and tax cut bill;
2. The Patient Protection and Affordable Care Act, also known as Obamacare, which CBO estimated would increase revenues and spending in approximately equal amounts;
3. The Tax Relief, Unemployment Insurance Reauthorization, and Job Creation Act of 2010, an $850 billion bill with payroll, income, and AMT tax cuts along with an extension of unemployment benefits; and
4. The American Taxpayer Relief Act of 2012, which included the expiration of the Bush tax cuts for high income earners and implemented a sequester (cap) on spending for the military and other discretionary categories of spending. Compared against a baseline where the Bush tax cuts were allowed to expire for all levels of income, it significantly increased future deficits. Compared against the prior year, it significantly reduced the deficit and avoided some future cost increases.

Obama inherited a highly ambiguous fiscal outlook, with several important tax laws scheduled to expire during his first term in office, not to mention uncertainty regarding the depth of the financial crisis and Great Recession. These laws included the Bush tax cuts of 2001 and 2003 (scheduled to expire in 2010) and temporary "patches" that prevented the alternative minimum tax from impacting the middle class. This ambiguity resulted in the CBO publishing a second "alternative fiscal scenario" during 2009 to help explain the consequences of making this tax relief permanent over the following decades. This ambiguity culminated in the United States fiscal cliff and was addressed by the latter two laws listed above, such that the CBO returned to publishing just one fiscal scenario by 2016.

== Addressing income inequality ==
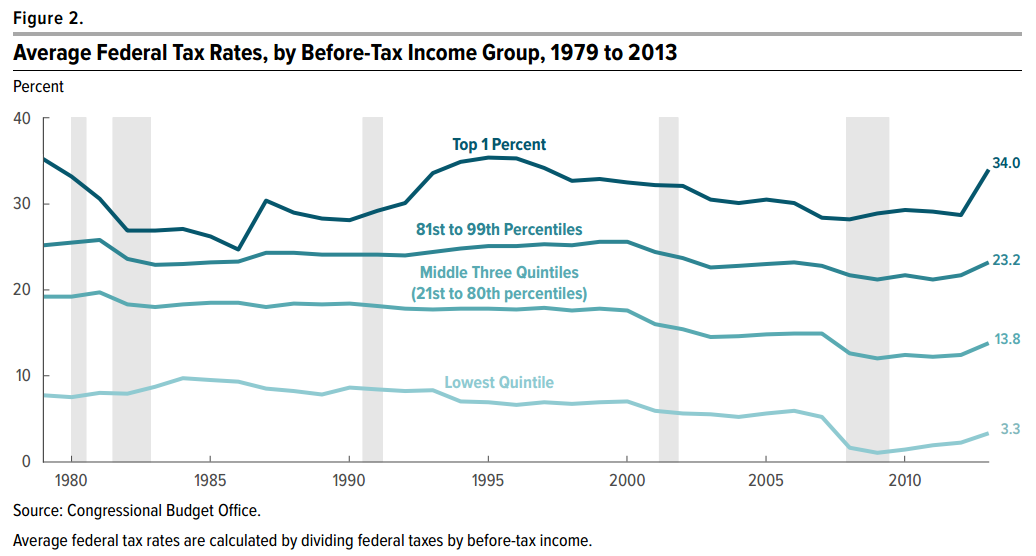
From 2012 to 2013, the average federal tax rate of the top 1% of income earners rose from 28% to 34%, due to tax increases in the ACA and the expiration of the Bush tax cuts for the highest income earners.

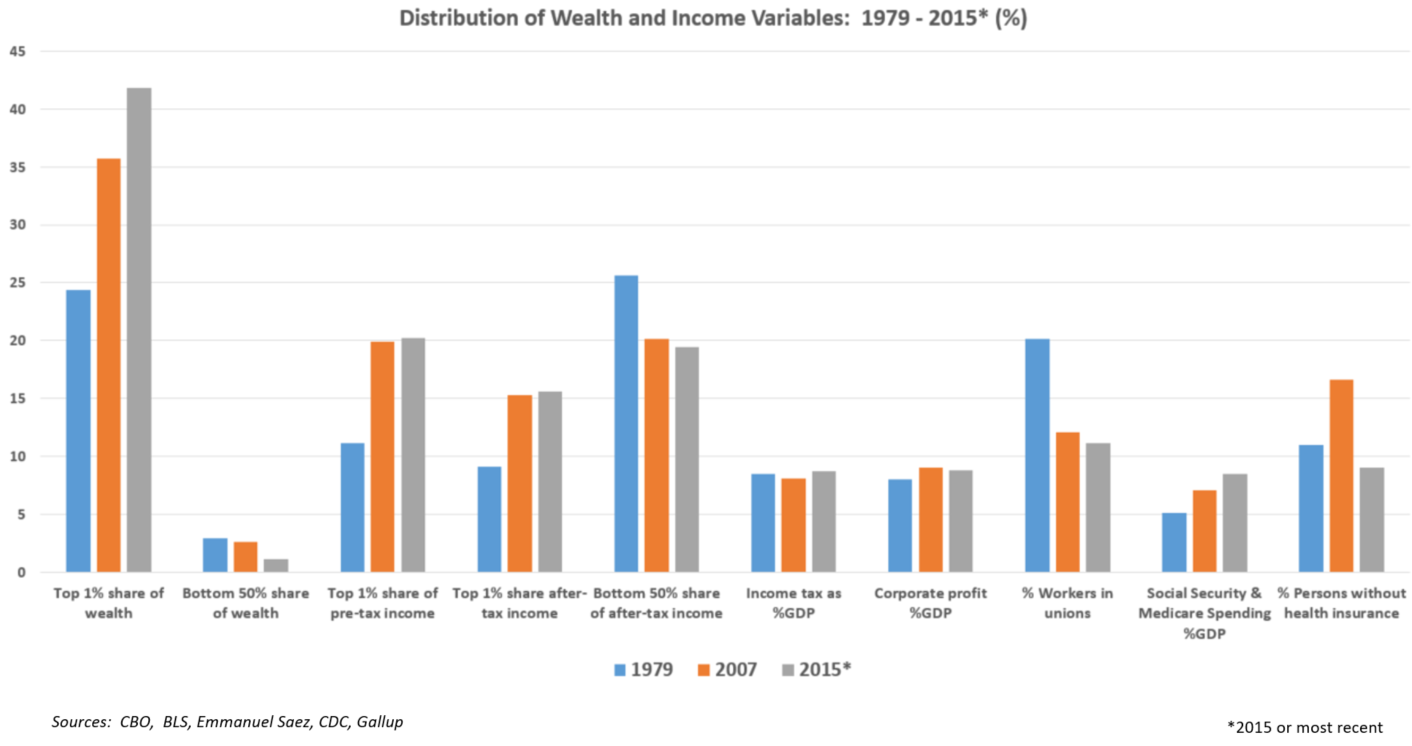
Selected economic variables related to wealth and income equality, comparing 1979, 2007, and 2015.

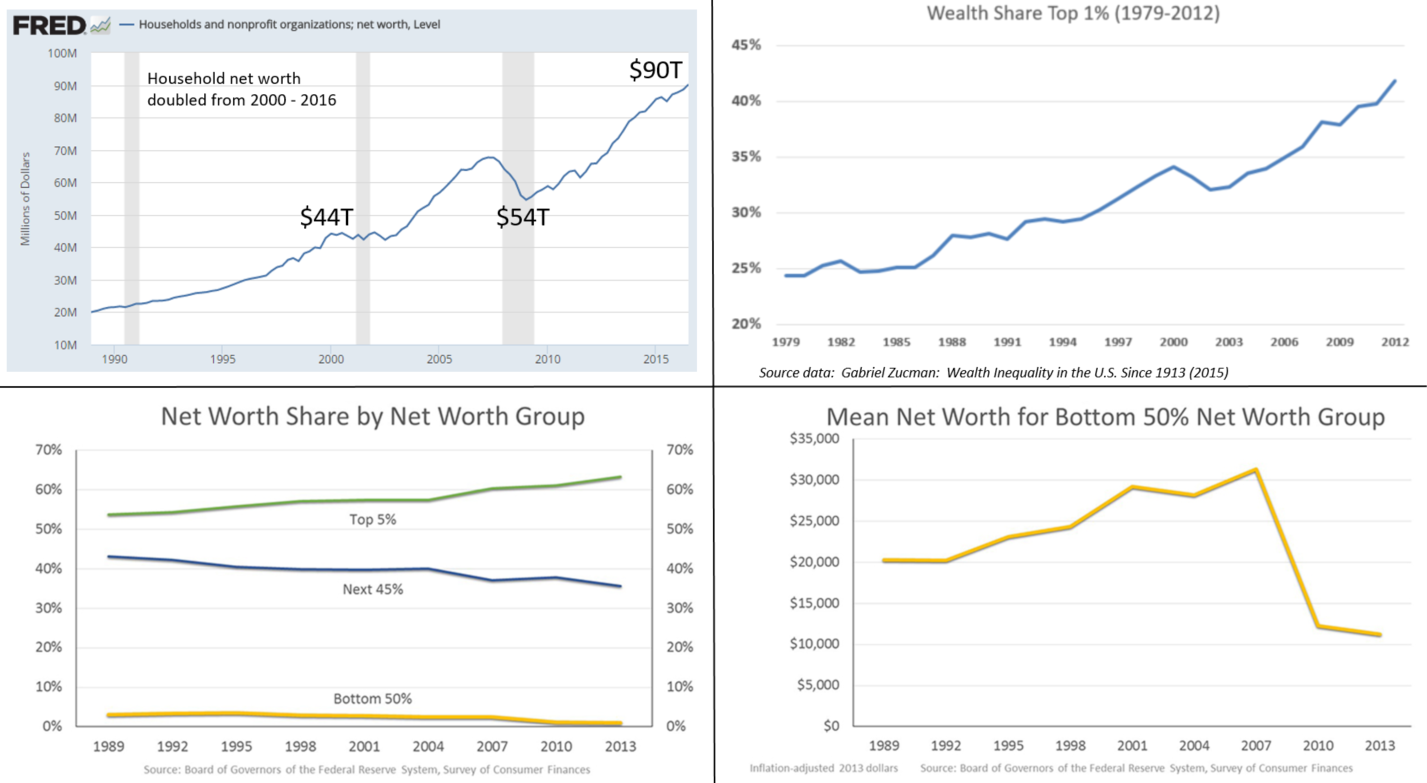
The image contains several charts related to U.S. wealth inequality. While U.S. net worth roughly doubled from 2000 to 2016, the gains went primarily to the wealthy. The share of wealth of the top 1% has increased since the 1970s.

With the economy recovering and major budget legislation behind him, President Obama began to shift to another priority, income and wealth inequality. From 1950 to 1979, the top 1% earned roughly a 10% share of the market or pre-tax income. However, this had risen to 24% by 2007, due to a combination of globalization, automation, and policy changes that weakened labor's bargaining position relative to capital. Further, the Center for American Progress estimated that 76% of the real income gains between 2009 and 2013 went to the top 1%. In December 2013, Obama declared that growing income inequality is a "defining challenge of our time" and called on Congress to bolster the safety net and raise wages. This came on the heels of the nationwide strikes of fast-food workers and Pope Francis' criticism of inequality and trickle-down economics.

Income inequality can be addressed by pre-tax (market) income policies ("pre-distribution") that raise worker pay, as well as after-tax policies that raise taxes on higher-income taxpayers to fund transfers to lower-income taxpayers ("redistribution"). President Obama attempted both strategies, with some success in reducing both the pre-tax and after-tax share of income of the top 1% measured 2012 to 2013 (the most recent CBO data available as of December 2016), which means the share of income of the bottom 99% increased.

An alternate data series, from economists Piketty, Saez, and Zucman (that includes 2014 data) also indicated that the income share of the top 1% both pre-tax and after-tax was lower in 2014 than 2012, indicating improved inequality. However, they also found the share of both pre-tax and after-tax income of the top 1% was slightly higher in 2014 than 2007.

=== Redistribution ===
Obama increased taxes on high-income taxpayers via: a) expiration of the Bush income tax cuts for the top 1–2% of income earners starting with 2013; and b) payroll tax increases on roughly the top 5% of earners as part of the ACA. This increased the average tax rate paid by the top 1% (incomes above $443,000 in 2015) from 28% in 2012 to 34% in 2013. According to the CBO, after-tax income inequality improved, by lowering the share of after-tax income received by the top 1% from 16.7% in 2007 to 15.1% in 2012 and to 12.4% in 2013.

The bottom 99% also saw an average federal tax rate increase by one percentage point from 2012 to 2013, mainly due to the expiration of the Obama payroll tax cuts, which were in place in 2011 and 2012. However, for income groups in the bottom 99%, the average federal tax rate remained at or below the 2007 level. Politifact rated the claim that Obama had cut taxes for middle-class families and small businesses as "Mostly True" in 2012.

In addition, the ACA Medicaid expansion (10 million persons in 2016) and subsidies (approximately 10 million persons received a total of $42 billion in 2016, or about $4,200 each) also served to address after-tax income inequality, by transferring money and providing health insurance to lower-income citizens. A 2016 report from the Obama Administration claimed that "Tax changes enacted since 2009 have boosted the share of after-tax income received by the bottom 99 percent of families by more than the tax changes of any previous Administration since at least 1960."

=== Predistribution ===
President Obama also attempted to address inequality before taxes (i.e., market income), with an increase in the minimum wage and infrastructure investment. While the Republican Congress did not support a federally-mandated increase in the minimum wage, 18 states did increase their minimum wages, benefiting an estimated 7 million workers, following the President's 2013 State of the Union speech calling for an increase. During late 2015, the House and Senate, in rare bipartisan form, passed the largest infrastructure package in a decade, costing $305 billion over five years, less than the $478 billion in Obama's initial request. He signed the Fixing America's Surface Transportation Act into law in December 2015.

Obama also issued several executive orders and his administration issued regulatory rulings designed to help workers. One included raising the salary threshold above which employers do not have to pay overtime, from $455 to $913 per week. This would have increased the earnings of as many as 4.2 million workers beginning December 1, 2016, but it was blocked by a federal judge. The Labor Department also issued guidelines for employers on whether to treat contractors as employees; the latter receive additional pay and benefits. President Obama also issued executive orders to raise pay at companies that receive government contracts.

According to the CBO, the top 1% received 18.7% of the pre-tax income in 2007, but 17.3% in 2012 and 15.0% in 2013. This indicated some progress on pre-tax inequality as well.

=== Wealth inequality ===
Wealth inequality had also risen similarly, with the share of wealth owned by the top 1% rising from 24% in 1979 to 36% by 2007. While U.S. household net worth rose nearly 30% from its pre-crisis peak in 2007 to 2016, much of this gain went to the wealthiest Americans, as it had prior to his tenure. By 2015, the share of wealth owned by the top 1% reached 42%. However, the share of wealth owned by the bottom 50% fell from 2.9% in 1979 to 2.6% in 2007 and 1.1% in 2015, as the crisis did additional damage to highly leveraged households that had purchased homes with low down-payments.

== Trade ==
In 2011, President Obama signed three trade deals with Colombia, Panama, and South Korea. Obama has urged Congress to ratify a 12-nation free trade pact called the Trans-Pacific Partnership. In theory, free trade enables economies to focus on those products where they have comparative advantage, making both economies better off. While trade maximizes the overall outcome, specific groups are helped or hurt by trade. Due to a backlash against globalization in both the U.S. and Europe by working-class voters, several politicians in the 2016 U.S. election expressed their opposition to the deal.

The trade deficit (imports greater than exports) fell dramatically as a result of the Great Recession, falling from a 2006 pre-crisis record peak of $802 billion to $380 billion by 2009. During Obama's presidency, the trade deficit moved in a range between approximately $400 and $500 billion.

== Economic results summary ==
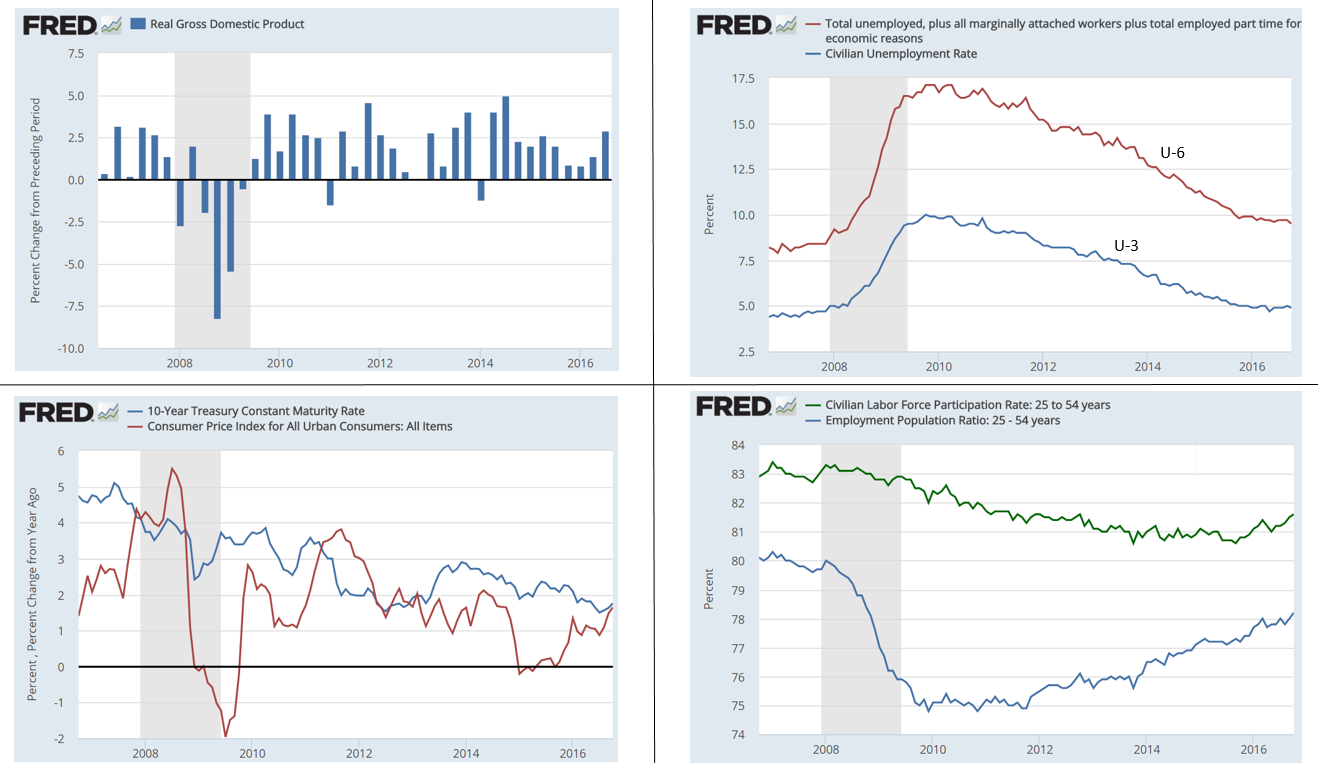
Several major U.S. economic variables during the Great Recession and President Obama's terms in office.

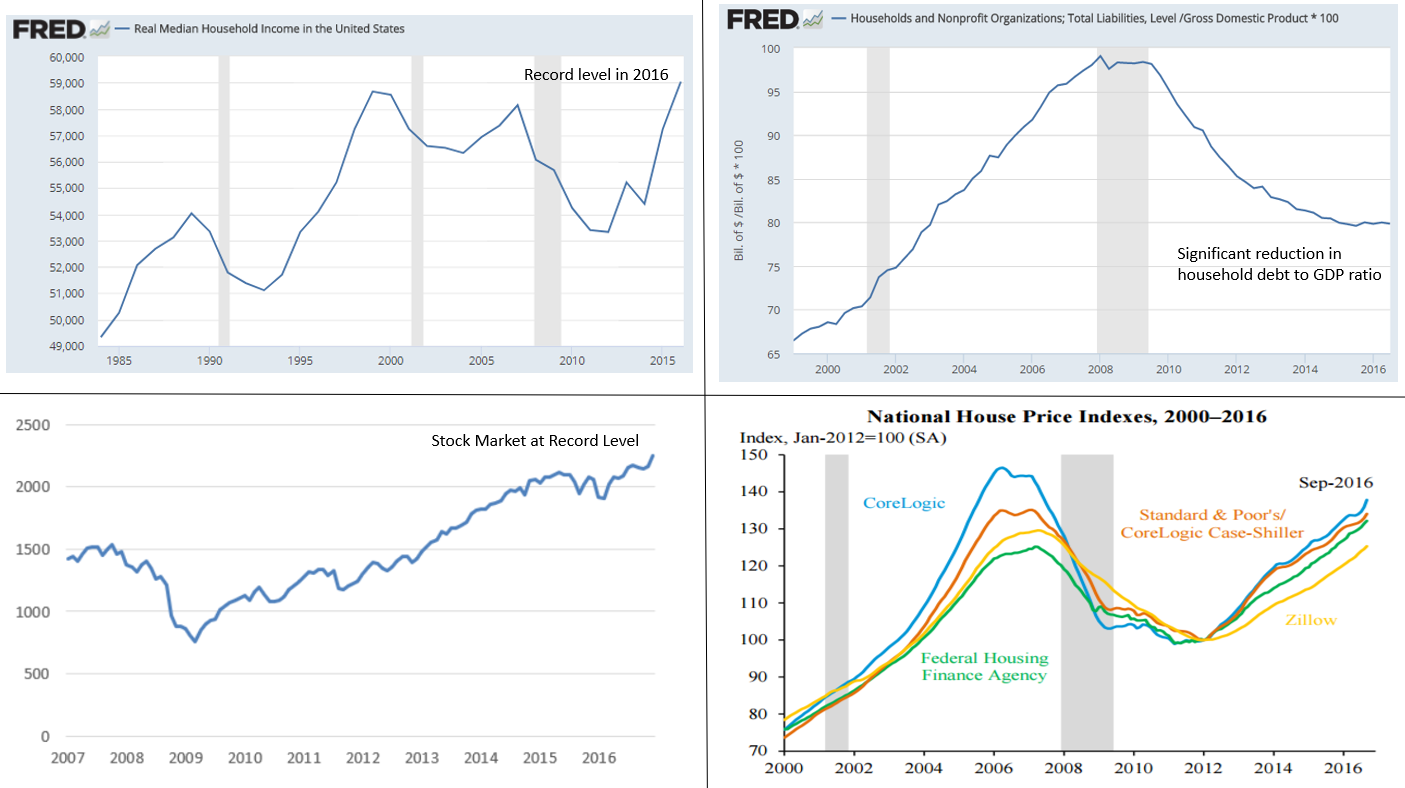
Panel chart showing several economic variables related to household income and net worth

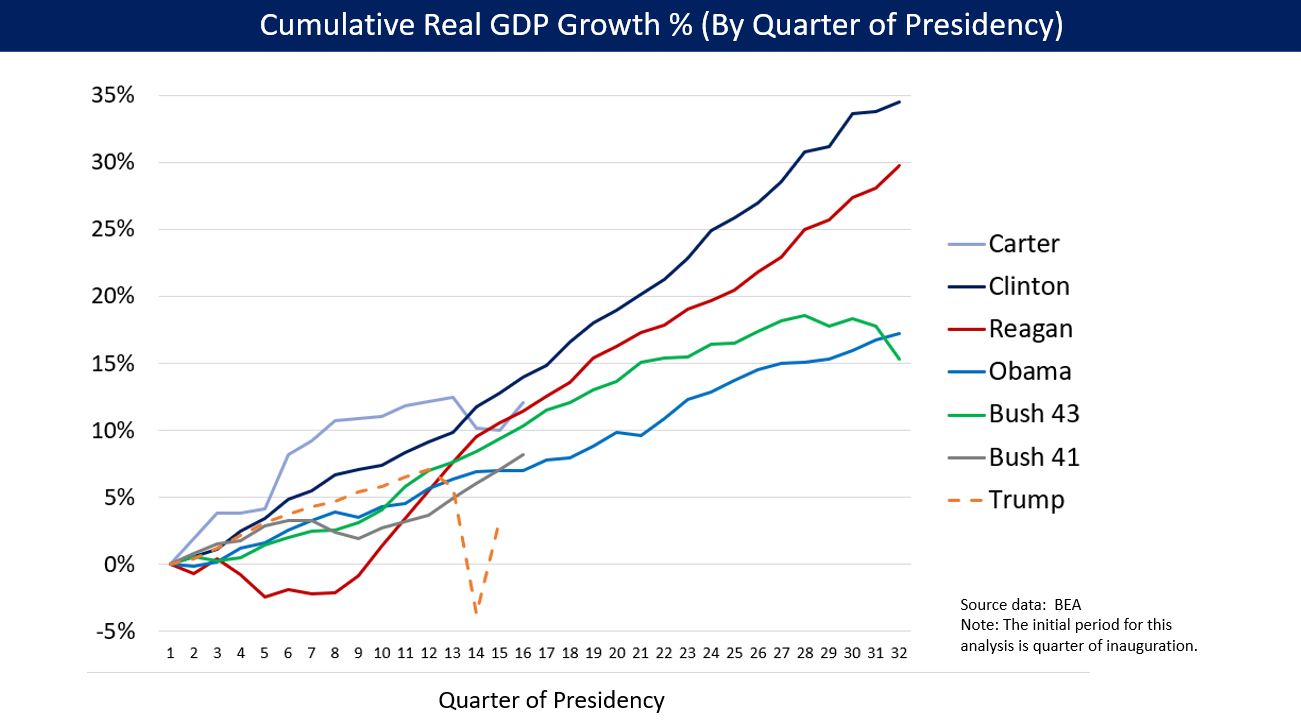
U.S. cumulative real (inflation-adjusted) GDP growth by President.

The economic performance during the Obama administration can be measured by analyzing several key variables: Analysis conducted by Bloomberg News in January 2019 found that the Obama economy after two years ranked second among the seven presidents from 1977 to 2019, based on fourteen metrics of economic activity and financial performance.

=== Overall ===
- Economic growth, measured as the change in real GDP, averaged 2.0% from Q2 2009 to Q4 2016. This was slower than the 2.6% average from Q1 1989 to Q4 2008. Real GDP grew nearly 3% during President Bush's first term but only 0.5% during his second. During the Clinton administration, the GDP growth was close to 4%, slightly faster than the Reagan administration.
- Real GDP rose from $14.4 trillion in Q1 2009 to $16.8 trillion in Q4 2016, a cumulative increase of $2.4 trillion or 16.6%. Real GDP per capita rose from $46,930 in 2009 to $51,523 in 2016 (a record level), an increase of $4,593 or 9.7%.
- Inflation (measured by CPI-All Urban Consumers, All Items) fell to a historically low level during his administration, averaging 1.4% from Q2 2009 to Q4 2016, well below the 3.0% average from Q1 1989 to Q4 2008.
- Interest rates also fell and remained very low. The yield on the 10-year Treasury bond averaged 2.4% from Q2 2009 to Q4 2016, well below the 5.8% average from Q1 1989-Q4 2008.
- The debt held by the public rose from $6.3 trillion on January 31, 2009, to $14.4 trillion on December 31, 2016, an increase of $8.1 trillion or 128%. Measured as a % GDP, it rose from 52.3% GDP in 2009 to 76% GDP by 2016. As described above, most of the debt increase was inherited from the prior administration (e.g., tax cuts and wars) or was due to the Great Recession (e.g., declining revenue and higher automatic stabilizer spending), as opposed to Obama's policies.
- The national debt (the debt held by the public plus intra-governmental debt) rose from $10.6 trillion on January 31, 2009, to $20.0 trillion on December 31, 2016, an increase of $9.4 trillion or 88%.
- Obama presided over the third-longest economic expansion among the 33 expansions tracked since records began in 1857, and the longest continuous stretch of private sector job creation since records began in 1939.

=== Labor market ===
- The number of civilian persons employed rose from 142.1 million in January 2009 to 152.1 million by December 2016, an increase of 10.0 million or 7.0%.
- The unemployment rate (U-3), rose during the Great Recession to peak at 10.0%, then fell back towards full employment by the end of his two terms to 4.7%, similar to 2007 pre-crisis levels during the Bush administration, and well-below the historical average of 5.8%. The wider U-6 rate, which includes marginally attached and those working part-time for economic reasons, followed a similar path to peak at 17.1%, but ended slightly above the pre-crisis levels at 9.2%.
- The ratio of employed to civilian population ("EM Ratio") for the prime working age group (ages 25 to 54) fell from around 80% pre-crisis to 75% by early 2010, then steadily recovered to 78% by 2016. However, the labor force participation rate ("LFPR") for that group continued a long-term downward trend, falling from around 83% pre-crisis to 81% during Obama's tenure.
- Between 2014 and 2015, real median household income grew 5.2%, or $2,800, the fastest growth on record. Contrary to prior trends, these gains were widely shared across the income distribution.
- The 2017 Economic Report of the President stated that: "Since the end of 2012, private production and non-supervisory workers, who comprise about 80 percent of private-sector employment, have seen their real hourly earnings increase by 5.3 percent, more than the total cumulative real wage gains for these workers from 1980 to 2007. Overall, real hourly wage growth since the business cycle peak in December 2007 has averaged 0.8 percent a year for these workers, the fastest growth of any business cycle (measured peak-to-peak) since the 1970s."
- The percent of persons aged 25 or older with a bachelor's degree or higher increased from 27.7% in 2008 to 30.1% in 2016.

=== Households ===
- Real median household income reached a record level of $59,039 by 2016, after recovering from a trough of $53,331 in 2012. The $2,800 or 5.2% increase between 2014 and 2015 was the largest one-year increase since the government started keeping track in 1968, and was followed by a 3.2% increase between 2015 and 2016.
- U.S. household and non-profit net worth also reached record highs, growing from $54.4 trillion in Q1 2009 to $92.8 trillion by Q4 2016, an increase of 70%, driven primarily by record stock and bond prices. Measured from the pre-crisis peak of $67.7 trillion in Q2 2007, it increased 37%.
- U.S. households significantly reduced their debt burden, from a peak of 99% GDP in 2008 to 80% by Q4 2016, as they increased savings to pay off mortgages or lost their homes to foreclosure in the Great Recession. This debt reduction ("deleveraging") was a headwind to the recovery through much of President Obama's tenure. In contrast, during the Bush administration, households had increased their debt burden dramatically, which boosted the economy but later proved unsustainable.
- The official poverty rate in 2015 was 13.5%, down from 14.8% in 2014 but up from 12.5% in 2007, as the economy recovered from the Great Recession of 2007, 2008, and 2009. In 2015, there were 43.1 million in poverty, 3.5 million less than 2014. This was the largest one-year drop in the poverty rate since the 1960s.
- Student loan debt rose from $706.1 billion (4.8% GDP) in Q1 2009 to $1,406.8 billion (7.45% GDP) in Q4 2016.

=== Businesses and markets ===
- U.S. corporate profits reached their highest level in history, both in terms of dollars ($1.771 trillion annualized in Q4 2014) and GDP percent (10.8% in Q1 2012). Corporate profits were robust after 2009 and remained near record levels from Q1 2012 to Q4 2016. Annualized corporate profits rose from $1.0 trillion in Q1 2009 to $1.7 trillion in Q4 2016, an increase of 70%.
- The stock market, measured by the S&P500 index, rose from its 10-year low of 676.53 on March 9, 2009, to 2,204.72 by November 23, 2016, a 226% increase. The S&P500 reached record highs 118 times during the Obama presidency.
- The stock market, measured by the Dow Jones Industrial Average, fell from its October 9, 2007 pre-crisis peak of 14,164.53 to 6,594.44 on March 5, 2009. It regained the pre-crisis peak on March 5, 2013, closing at 14,253.77. It rose to 18,636.52 on August 15, 2016, and 19,974.62 on December 20, 2016.

=== Energy ===
- Imports of petroleum products fell from 1.85% GDP in 2009 to 0.86% GDP in 2016. The U.S. was less reliant on foreign oil than it has been in nearly 30 years.
- Gasoline prices fluctuated between $2.00 and $4.00, falling towards the lower part of that range after mid-2014.
- From 2008 to 2016, the U.S. tripled the amount of energy harnessed from wind and increased solar power generation by a factor of 30.
- In June 2014, the Obama administration waived the crude oil export ban that had been in place since the 1973 oil crisis, injecting American oil production into global trading markets. Prices for benchmark Brent crude and American gasoline immediately declined precipitously. Congress and Obama fully repealed the export ban in December 2015.

=== Comparison with subsequent administrations ===
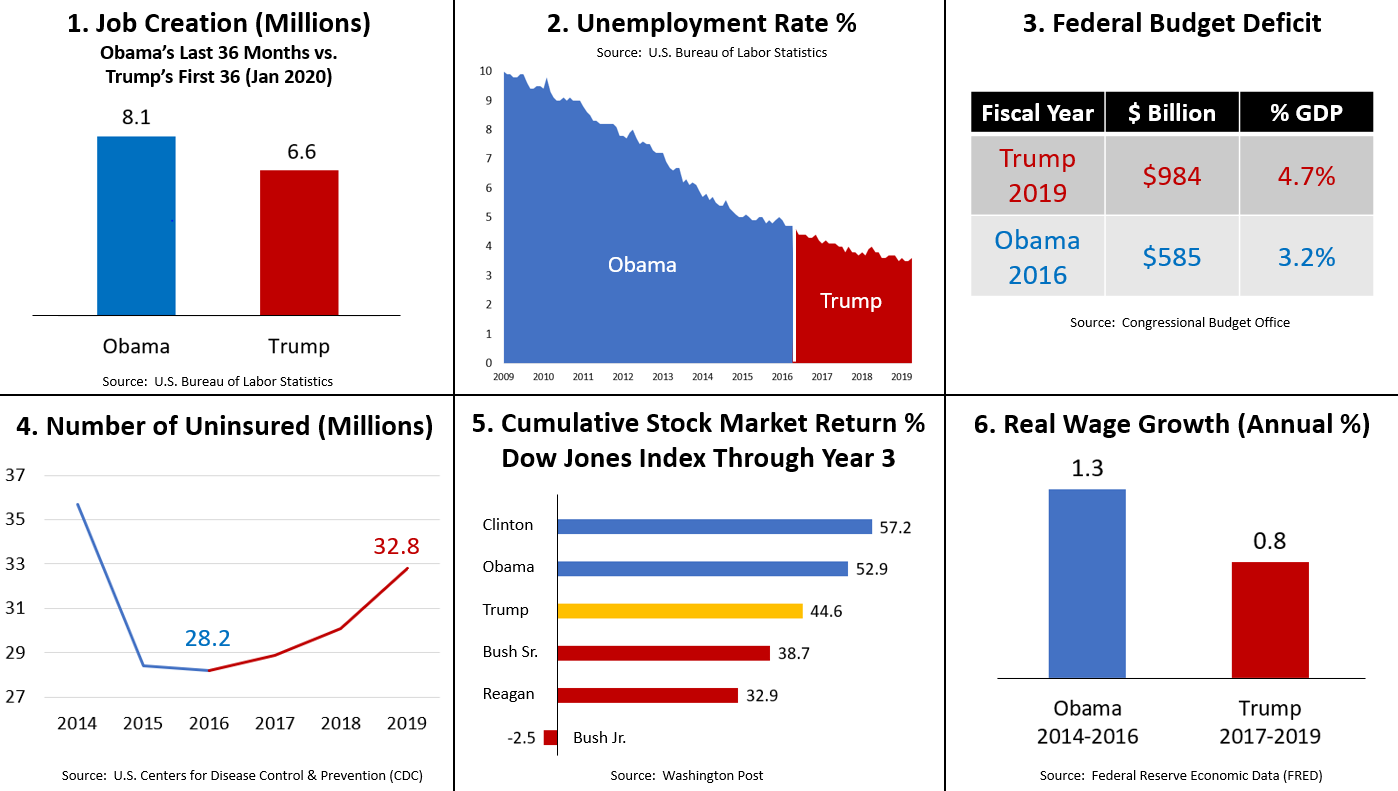
Economic scorecard comparing Trump and Obama presidencies. Refer to sources on the detail page.

President Trump often disparaged the economic record of Barack Obama during both the Obama and Trump presidencies, often using false or misleading statistics. However, on many key variables Trump compared unfavorably with President Obama's record through year three of Trump's presidency (i.e., 2019, before the impact of the coronavirus pandemic in 2020), while other variables continued trends established during the Obama era.

1. Job creation was slower in Trump's first 36 months (6.6 million) than Obama's last 36 months (8.1 million).
2. The unemployment rate fell from 10.0% in October 2009 to 4.7% by December 2016, a 5.3 percentage point decline. The 4.7% rate was below the historical average of 5.6%. Under Trump, it then fell to 3.5% by November 2019, another 1.2 percentage points. This improvement pattern was similar for all racial groups after 2010.
3. The budget deficit increased significantly as a percent of GDP and in dollar terms under President Trump, rising from 3.2% GDP and $585 billion in fiscal year 2016 at the end of the Obama Administration, to $984 billion and 4.7% GDP by fiscal year 2019.
4. The number of persons without health insurance (i.e., uninsured) rose from 28.2 million in 2016 to 32.8 million in 2019, an increase of 4.6 million or 16%. President Trump's first year (2017) was the first year with an increase in uninsured since 2010.
5. The stock market (measured by the S&P500) increased cumulatively by 77% in Obama's first term and 59% in Obama's second term, versus 68% in Trump's term. According to Marketwatch, S&P 500 annual average growth was 13.84% under Obama and 13.73% under Trump. The Dow Jones Industrial Average grew 12.10% on average under Obama versus 11.77% under Trump. President Trump cut corporate income taxes by about one-third and increased budget deficits.
6. Real (inflation-adjusted) wages grew faster from 2014 to 2016 under Obama at 1.3% per year on average, versus 0.8% for 2017-2019 under President Trump.
7. Real GDP averaged 2.5% in Trump's first 3 years, vs 2.4% for Obama's final three years.

== Economic narratives ==
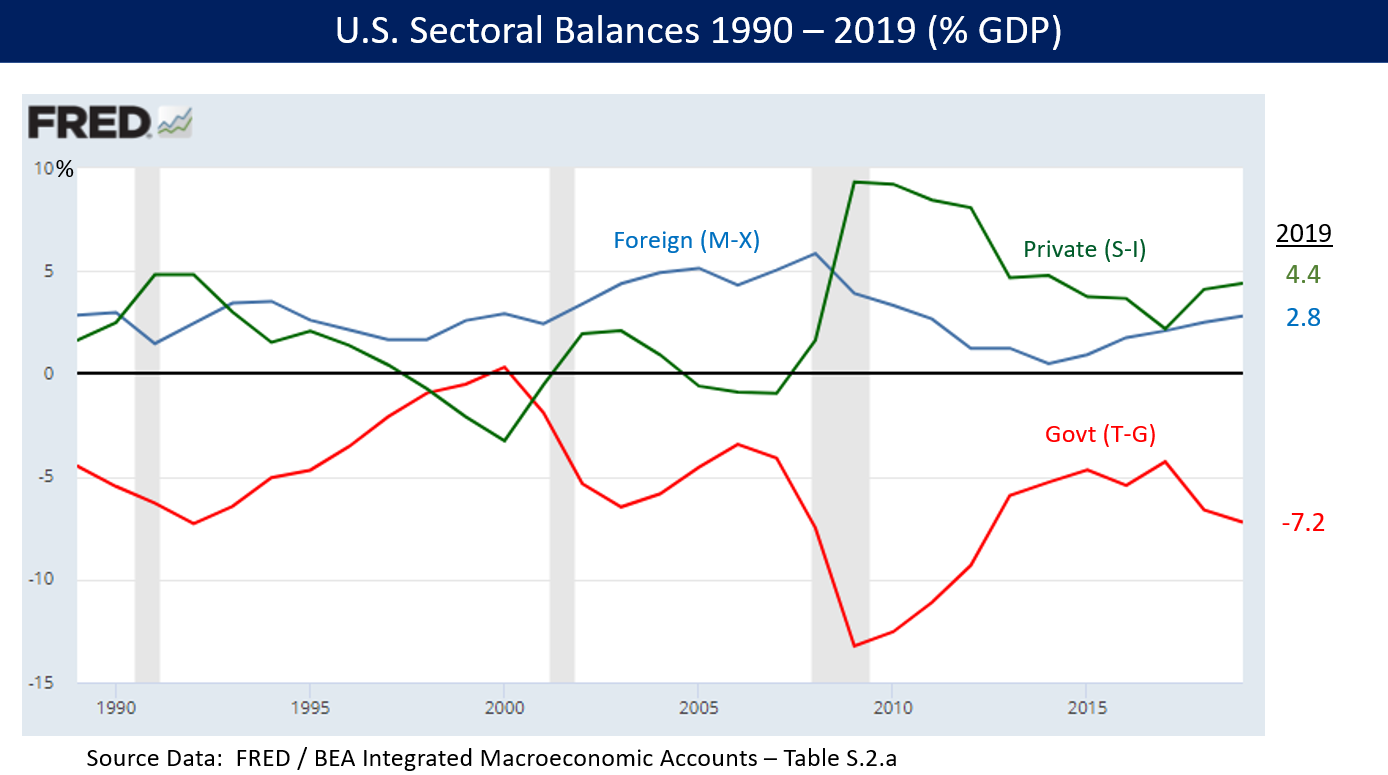
Sectoral financial balances in U.S. economy 1990–2017. By definition, the three balances must net to zero. During President Obama's tenure, an increase in the private sector surplus due to the Great Recession drove a corresponding government budget deficit.

One narrative for explaining the economic and budgetary performance during President Obama's tenure uses sectoral balances. By definition, a country running a trade deficit (capital surplus) and where private savings exceeds business investment (private sector surplus) must run a government budget deficit, as the three must net to zero. Both Martin Wolf and Paul Krugman explained that as the Great Recession hit, the saving (deleveraging) of the private sector significantly increased, while business investment declined in the face of reduced consumer spending. This created an enormous private sector surplus. Since the trade deficit did not change significantly, the offset was a large increase in the government budget deficit. The record drop in tax revenue and large increases in automatic stabilizer expenditures (such as unemployment compensation, food stamps, and disability payments) were the mechanism for much of the additional deficit and debt increases, even before new economic policies were implemented. The significant reduction in demand implied by the increase in the private sector surplus (i.e., consumers and businesses saving rather than spending or investing) created a severe recession.

Another way to look at President Obama's tenure is as a slow recovery from a combined financial crisis and recession. Research indicates such recoveries can be protracted, with lengthy periods of high unemployment and substandard economic growth. The U.S. economy steadily recovered as homeowners completed their deleveraging (debt reduction) and began to spend again, encouraging businesses to hire and invest. Supporting the recovery process were the stimulative monetary policies of the Federal Reserve, which maintained low interest rates and asset buying programs to encourage economic growth throughout President Obama's tenure.

== Views before election ==
=== Energy policy ===
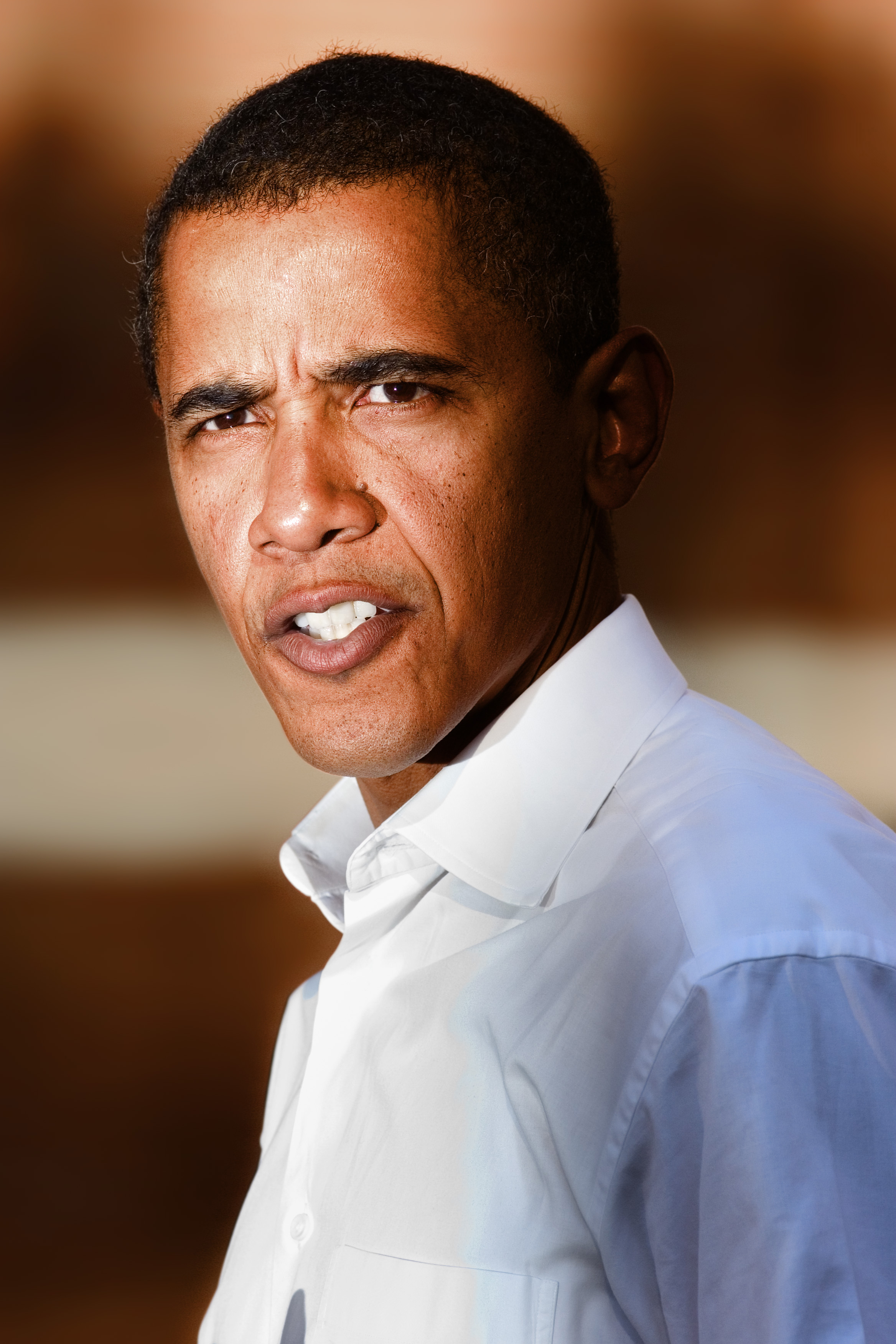
Barack Obama delivering a speech at the University of Southern California in support of California Proposition 87

In his New Energy For America plan, Obama proposed to reduce overall U.S. oil consumption by at least 35%, or 10 million barrels per day, by 2030 in order to offset imports from OPEC nations. And by 2011 the United States was said to be "awash with domestic oil and increasingly divorced and less reliant on foreign imports".

Obama voted in favor of the Energy Policy Act of 2005, which provided incentives (chiefly tax breaks) to reduce national consumption of energy and to encourage a wide range of alternative energy sources. It also resulted in a net tax increase on oil companies.

Obama and other senators introduced the BioFuels Security Act in 2006. "It's time for Congress to realize what farmers in America's heartland have known all along – that we have the capacity and ingenuity to decrease our dependence on foreign oil by growing our own fuel," Obama said. In a May 2006 letter to President George W. Bush, he joined four other midwest farming state senators in calling for the preservation of a $0.54-per-gallon tariff on imported ethanol.

In an interview with NBC's Tim Russert on May 4, 2008, Obama said, "...we've got a serious food problem around the world. We've got rising food prices here in the United States." "There's no doubt that biofuels may be contributing to it. And what I've said is, my top priority is making sure that people are able to get enough to eat. And if it turns out that we've got to make changes in our ethanol policy to help people get something to eat, then that's got to be the step we take."

On the issue of nuclear power, in 2005, Obama stated, "... as Congress considers policies to address air quality and the deleterious effects of carbon emissions on the global ecosystem, it is reasonable – and realistic – for nuclear power to remain on the table for consideration. Illinois has 11 nuclear power plants – the most of any State in the country – and nuclear power provides more than half of Illinois's electricity needs." Regarding McCain's plans for 45 new nuclear power plants, Obama said that it's not serious, it's not new, it's not the kind of energy policy that will give families the relief they need. Obama declared himself flatly opposed to building the Yucca Mountain nuclear waste repository in Nevada. Furthermore, he opposed new nuclear plants until the problems of nuclear waste storage, safety and cost can be addressed.

In 2006, in response to Illinois residents' concerns about unreported radioactive leaks by Exelon Corporation, Obama introduced a Senate bill to effect mandatory disclosure of such leaks. In 2008, The New York Times, which had endorsed Hillary Clinton, charged that, in revising his bill, Obama had "removed language mandating prompt reporting and simply offered guidance to regulators". In response, the Obama campaign cited a National Journal analysis of the revised bill, showing that "Obama's bill would require that any leak of radioactive materials exceeding the levels set by the Nuclear Regulatory Commission and the EPA be reported to state and local authorities, and to the NRC within 24 hours."

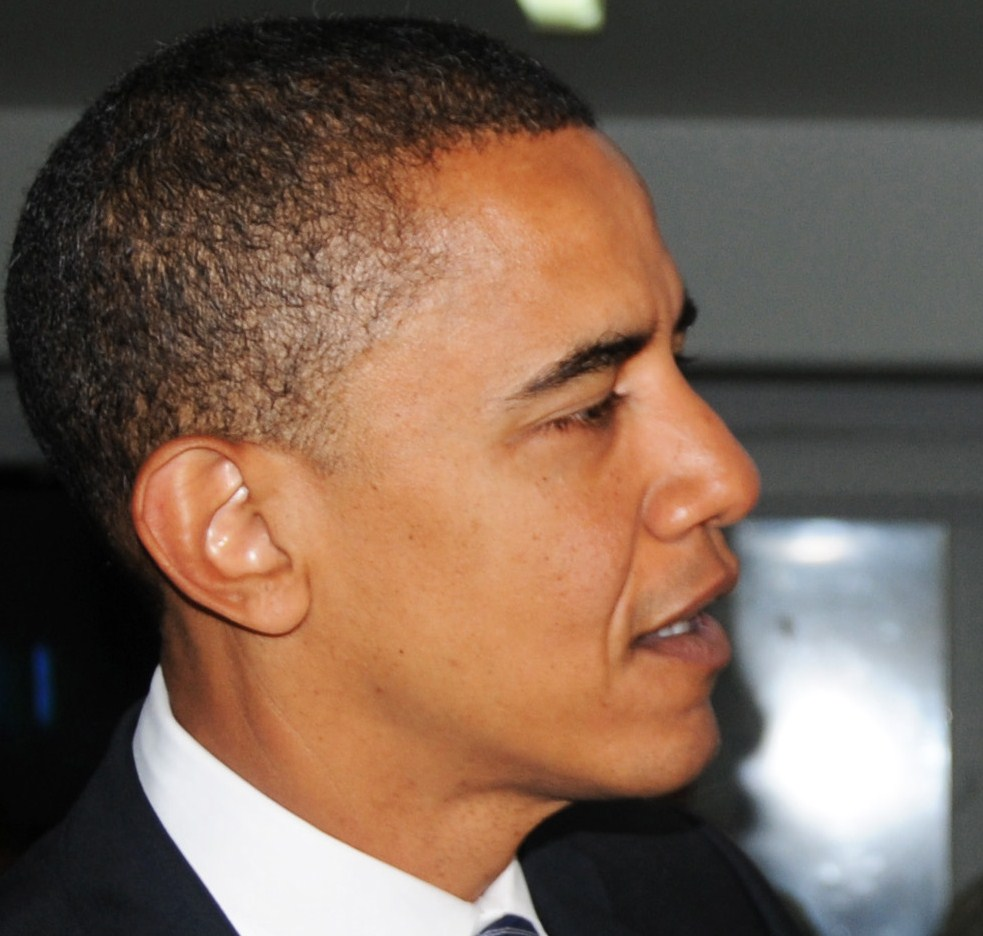
U.S. Senator Barack Obama

Obama and other senators introduced a bill in 2007 to promote the development of commercially viable plug-in hybrids and other electric-drive vehicles in order to shift away from petroleum fuels and "toward much cleaner – and cheaper – electricity for transportation". Similar legislation is now in effect in the Energy Independence and Security Act of 2007. Obama proposes that the U.S. Government invest in such developments using revenue generated from an auction-based cap-and-trade or emissions trading program to reduce greenhouse gas emissions.

Obama stresses innovation as a means to improve energy efficiency, calling for a 50% improvement by 2030. He has called for a 50 miles per US gallon (4.7 L/100 km; 60 mpg_{‑imp}) rule, proposing tax credits to automakers in order to ease the transition.

He opposes drilling in the Arctic National Wildlife Refuge.

On June 22, 2008, Obama proposed tightening regulations on oil speculators in an effort to ease record high prices of oil. "My plan fully closes the Enron loophole and restores common-sense regulation," Obama said.

=== Health care ===
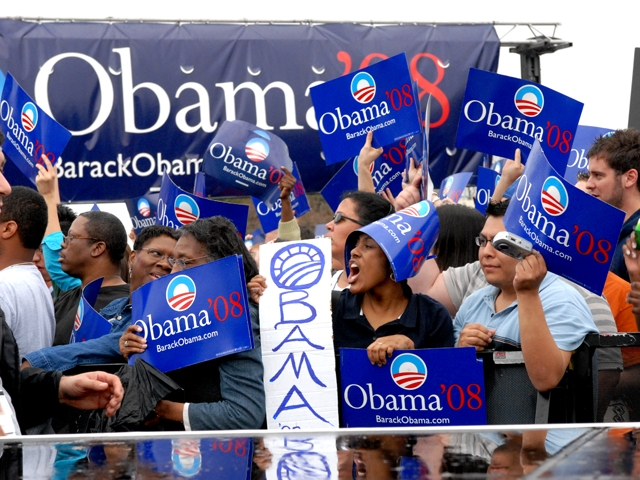
Obama supporters at a campaign rally in Austin, Texas, on February 23, 2007. President Obama said he supports universal health care and programs to increase access to education.

On January 24, 2007, Obama spoke about his position on health care at Families USA, a health care advocacy group. Obama said, "The time has come for universal health care in America [...] I am absolutely determined that by the end of the first term of the next president, we should have universal health care in this country." Obama went on to say that he believed that it was wrong that forty-seven million Americans are uninsured, noting that taxpayers already pay over $15 billion annually to care for the uninsured. Obama cites cost as the reason so many Americans are without health insurance. Obama's health care plan includes implementing guaranteed eligibility for affordable health care for all Americans, paid for by insurance reform, reducing costs, removing patent protection for pharmaceuticals, and required employer contributions. He would provide for mandatory health care insurance for children.

In July 2008 The New York Times reported that Senator Obama has promised to "bring down premiums by $2,500 for the typical family." His advisers have said that the $2,500 premium reduction includes, in addition to direct premium savings, the average family's share of the reduction in employer paid health insurance premiums and the reduction in the cost of government health programs such as Medicare and Medicaid.

The Associated Press reported in September 2008 that Senator Obama was proposing a National Health Insurance Exchange that would include both private insurance plans and a Medicare-like government run option. Coverage would be guaranteed regardless of health status, and premiums would not vary based on health status either. The campaign estimates the cost of the program at $60 billion annually. The plan requires that parents cover their children, but does not require adults to buy insurance.

According to an October 26, 2008, article in The New York Times, Obama is considering a new payroll tax on large and medium employers who do not already provide their employees with health insurance, and this tax would be used to pay for health care for uninsured people, but Obama has not cited the specific percentage of payroll that the tax would be, or how small a number of employees the employer would have to have in order to be exempt from the tax.

=== Homes, mortgages, mortgage crisis, and real estate industry ===
Obama voted for the $700 billion Emergency Economic Stabilization Act of 2008.

Obama introduced the Stop Fraud Act to increase penalties for mortgage fraud by mortgage brokers and real estate brokers and to provide more protections for low-income homebuyers.

In regards to capital gains on house sales, Obama says he favors increasing capital gains tax above the present 15% rate to 20% for families whose income is above $250,000.

=== Views related to income inequality ===
==== Corporate governance ====
On April 20, 2007, Obama introduced a bill in the Senate (Shareholder Vote on Executive Compensation Act – S. 1181) requiring public companies to give shareholders an annual nonbinding vote on executive compensation, popularly called "Say on pay". A companion bill introduced by Rep. Barney Frank passed the House the same day. Several corporations voluntarily have begun to give shareholders such a vote because of concerns about excessive CEO salaries.

==== Labor rights ====
Obama supported the Employee Free Choice Act, a bill that adds penalties for labor violations and which would circumvent the secret ballot requirement to organize a union. Obama promises to sign the EFCA into law. He is also a co-sponsor of the "Re-empowerment of Skilled and Professional Employees and Construction Tradesworkers" or RESPECT act (S. 969) that aims to overturn the National Labor Relations Board's "Kentucky River" 532 U.S. 706 (2001) decision that redefined many employees lacking the authority to hire, fire, or discipline, as "supervisors" who are not protected by federal labor laws.

==== Minimum wage ====
Obama favored the increase in the federal minimum wage from $5.15 an hour to $7.25, and he voted to end the filibuster against a bill to accomplish that. He favored raising it to $9.50 an hour by 2011, and then indexing it for inflation afterwards. In his State of the Union speech in 2012, he hinted at proposing legislation to raise minimum wage rate to $9.00/hr sometime during his next term. In January 2014 he signed an executive order raising the minimum wage for federal "workers who are performing services or constructing buildings" to $10.10/hr and began garnering support for a bill to enact this change nationally. The change made to the federal worker minimum wage applies only to new contracts or contracts having their terms changed and takes effect beginning in 2015.

In April 2014, the United States Senate debated the Minimum Wage Fairness Act (S. 1737; 113th Congress). The bill would amend the Fair Labor Standards Act of 1938 (FLSA) to increase the federal minimum wage for employees to $10.10 per hour over the course of a two-year period. The bill was strongly supported by President Barack Obama and many of the Democratic senators, but strongly opposed by Republicans in the Senate and House. Obama strongly supported increasing the minimum wage, giving speeches about it urging Congress to take action. Obama argued that "if you pay people well, there's more money in everybody's pockets, and everybody does better."

Ultimately, the federal minimum wage by the end of Obama's term was still at $7.25 an hour.

==== Equal pay ====
Obama favors the concept of equal pay (the abolition of wage differences between genders). He has supported legislation designed to improve the effectiveness of the Equal Pay Act of 1963. In 2007, the House of Representatives passed the Lilly Ledbetter Fair Pay Act, which, according to the National Federation of Independent Business, would have allowed "employees to file charges of pay discrimination within 180 days of the last received paycheck affected by the alleged discriminatory decision." The bill would have overturned the Supreme Court decision in Ledbetter v. Goodyear. There the Court dismissed a woman's discrimination claim because she had filed it more than 180 days after the first affected paycheck. The bill died in a 2008 Senate vote in which Obama and other Democrats could not break a Republican filibuster. In the 111th congress it was passed again, and Obama signed it on January 29, 2009. The first Trump administration ended the Lilly Ledbetter fair pay act.

==== Education ====
During an October 2004 debate, Obama stated that he opposed the mainstream view on education.

In a July 2007 address to the National Education Association, Obama supported merit pay for teachers, to be based on standards to be developed "with teachers". Obama also called for higher pay for teachers. Obama's plan is estimated to cost $18 billion annually and was originally planned to be partially funded by delaying NASA's Constellation program for five years but he has since reconsidered and stated that he will look for "an entirely different offset". "We owe it to our children to invest in early-childhood education; and recruit an army of new teachers and give them better pay and more support; and finally decide that, in this global economy, the chance to get a college education should not be a privilege for the few, but a birthright of every American." He also is against the teaching of intelligent design as science, but supports teaching theology.

Obama has proposed the American Opportunity Tax Credit, which would provide a refundable tax credit for education in exchange for community service.

Obama wants 5,000 failing schools to close, and then reopen with new principals and teachers.

=== Network neutrality and government use of information technology ===
In a June 2006 podcast, Obama expressed support for telecommunications legislation to protect network neutrality on the Internet, saying: "It is because the Internet is a neutral platform that I can put out this podcast and transmit it over the Internet without having to go through any corporate media middleman. I can say what I want without censorship or without having to pay a special charge. But the big telephone and cable companies want to change the Internet as we know it."

Obama reaffirmed his commitment to net neutrality at a meeting with Google employees in November 2007, at which he said, "once providers start to privilege some applications or web sites over others, then the smaller voices get squeezed out, and we all lose." At the same event, Obama pledged to appoint a chief technology officer to oversee the U.S. government's management of IT resources and promote wider access to government information and decision making.

In a February 2014 official blog post titled "We The People Response: Reaffirming the White House's Commitment to Net Neutrality", the Obama administration, via chief technology officer Todd Park, once again reaffirmed its commitment to net neutrality by stating, "Preserving an open Internet is vital not to just to the free flow of information, but also to promoting innovation and economic productivity. The Trump administration repealed net neutrality in 2017.

=== Taxation ===
Under Obama's plan, middle-class families would see their income taxes cut, with no family making less than $250,000 seeing an increase. In June 2008, Obama voted in favor of a budget that would raise the taxes on unmarried individuals with a taxable income of over $32,000 by pushing their tax bracket from 25% to 28%. Obama has proposed a tax plan which includes tax credits to lower the amount of taxes paid. It is argued that the typical middle-class family would receive over $1,000 in tax relief, with tax payments that are 20% lower than they faced under President Ronald Reagan. According to the Tax Policy Center, the Obama plan provides three times as much tax relief for middle-class families as the McCain plan. Obama's plan includes a temporary "Making Work Pay" program, which gives a tax credit at 6.2% of earned income up to $400 for single workers (making less than $75,000/yr), and an $800 for married couples (making less than $150,000/yr), expiring at the end of 2010; this is claimed on Schedule M of Form 1040. Families making more than $250,000 would pay either the same or lower income tax rates than they paid in the 1990s, leaving no family to pay higher income tax rates than they would have paid in the 1990s. For the wealthiest 2% of families, Obama plans to reverse a portion of the tax cuts they have received over the past eight years. Dividend rates would be 39 percent lower than what President George W. Bush proposed in his 2001 tax cut.

Obama's plan is to cut income taxes overall, which he states would reduce revenues to below the levels that prevailed under Ronald Reagan (less than 18.2 percent of GDP). Obama argues that his plan is a net tax cut, and that his tax relief for middle-class families is larger than the revenue raised by his tax changes for families over $250,000. Obama plans to pay for the tax changes while bringing down the budget deficit by cutting unnecessary spending.

Speaking in November 2006 to members of Wake Up Wal-Mart, a union-backed campaign group, Obama said: "You need to pay your workers enough that they can actually not only shop at Wal-Mart, but ultimately send their kids to college and save for retirement." His tax plan is projected to bring in an additional $700 billion in taxes over the next 10 years.

In The Audacity of Hope and the Blueprint for Change Obama advocates responding to the "precarious budget situation" by eliminating "tax credits that have outlived their usefulness", closing corporate tax loopholes, and restoring the PAYGO policy that prohibits increases in federal spending without a way to compensate for the lost revenue.

During an October 13, 2008 speech at Toledo, Ohio, Obama said that for the next two years, he favors a $3,000 tax credit to businesses for each new full-time employee whom they hire above the number in their current work force.

For people with incomes above $250,000, Obama wants to reduce their charitable tax deduction from 35 cents for each dollar donated to 28 cents for each dollar donated, to match the level of deductions for people making less than $250,000. In a press conference on March 24, 2009, Obama stated that he wanted to return to the rate that existed in the Reagan administration. "There's very little evidence that this has a significant impact on charitable giving," said Obama. "I'll tell you what has a significant impact on charitable giving, is a financial crisis and an economy that's contracting. And so the most important thing that I can do for charitable giving is to fix the economy, to get banks lending again, to get businesses opening their doors again, to get people back to work again." Thomas L. Hungerford of the Congressional Research Service has written that "allowing the tax cuts targeted to high income taxpayers to expire as scheduled could help reduce budget deficits in the short-term without stifling the economic recovery."

Obama said he wanted to "look at raising the capital gains tax for purposes of fairness."

=== Social Security ===
In response to a possible shortfall in Social Security funding, Obama has endorsed imposition of a new FICA tax on incomes above $250,000. Social Security has an income "cap" beyond which the payroll tax is not collected; in 2015 and 2016, the cap was $118,500. Obama opposed Bush's proposal for privatization of Social Security.

=== Lobbying and campaign finance reform ===
Obama has spoken out numerous times against the influence of lobbying in the United States. He also co-sponsored legislation that limits lobbyists' influence by mandating that lawmakers pay full charter fare when flying on lobbyists' corporate jets.

On January 24, 2007, in reference to his stated plan to take public financing should he procure the nomination, he said, "I think that for a time, the presidential public financing system works." On November 27, he said, "I will aggressively pursue an agreement with the Republican nominee to preserve a publicly financed general election," and on February 28, 2008, he wrote that he planned to "aggressively pursue" a publicly financed campaign, later promising to sit down with John McCain to ensure "a public system" of campaign financing is preserved. On June 19, 2008, he opted out of public campaign financing and declared, "I support a robust system of public financing of elections (...) but the public financing of presidential elections as it exists today is broken." Furthermore, he maintained that he would not take contributions from federal lobbyists and special interests during his 2008 presidential campaign.

According to his website, Obama would create an online database of lobbying reports, campaign finance filings and ethics records, and would create an independent watchdog agency to oversee congressional ethical violations.

=== Immigration ===
Obama supports a guest worker program, and voted in favor of the Bush administration backed Comprehensive Immigration Reform Act of 2007. Obama has said that he "will not support any bill that does not provide [an] earned path to citizenship for the undocumented population."

Obama has said that he does not believe that the 12 million illegal immigrants should be deported. He said "It's not going to happen. We're not going to go round them up ... We should give them a pathway to citizenship."

In September 2006, Obama voted for the Secure Fence Act, authorizing the construction of 700 miles (1,100 km) of fencing along the United States–Mexico border.

Obama has supported granting driver's licenses to illegal immigrants.

In June 2007, Obama voted against declaring English as the official language of the federal government.

In November 2007, Obama stated that, "We can … go a long way toward meeting industry's need for skilled workers with Americans. Until we have achieved that, I will support a temporary increase in the H-1B visa program as a stopgap measure until we can reform our immigration system comprehensively."

In July 2007, Obama said, "Find out how many senators appeared before an immigration rally last year. Who was talking the talk, and who walked the walk – because I walked…I didn't run away from the issue, and I didn't just talk about it in front of Latino audiences."

"I believe we must secure our borders, fix our broken immigration bureaucracy, and require the 12 million undocumented to get on a responsible path to citizenship. I will also increase the number of people we allow in the country legally to a level that unites families and meets the demand for jobs employers cannot fill" "I support comprehensive immigration reform that includes improving our visa programmes, including the H-1B programme, to attract some of the world's most talented people to America", Obama said in an interview with IANS in October 2008.

On 25 November 2013, Ju Hong, a 24-year-old South Korean immigrant without legal documentation, shouted at Obama to use his executive power to stop deportation of illegal immigrants. Obama said "If, in fact, I could solve all these problems without passing laws in Congress, then I would do so." "But we're also a nation of laws, that's part of our tradition," he continued. "And so the easy way out is to try to yell and pretend like I can do something by violating our laws. And what I'm proposing is the harder path, which is to use our democratic processes to achieve the same goal."

=== Affirmative action ===
In reference to state ballot initiatives on affirmative action, Obama's spokesperson Candice Toliver said that "Senator Obama believes in a country in which opportunity is available to all Americans, regardless of race, gender or economic status. That's why he opposes these ballot initiatives, which would roll back opportunity for millions of Americans and cripple efforts to break down historic barriers to the progress of qualified women and minorities."

Obama writes in his most recent book, The Audacity of Hope: "Affirmative action programs, when properly structured, can open up opportunities otherwise closed to qualified minorities without diminishing opportunities for white students." In July, Obama stated, "I am a strong supporter of affirmative action when properly structured so that it is not just a quota, but it is acknowledging and taking into account some of the hardships and difficulties that communities of color may have experienced, continue to experience, and it also speaks to the value of diversity in all walks of American life." He has indicated support for affirmative action based on class, not just race, (q.v. redistributive change) in comments where he said that his daughters should be treated by prospective colleges and employers as people that grew up with a privileged background. The Trump administration has reversed the Obama era affirmative action policies.

=== Trade ===
Barack Obama made critical statements about the North American Free Trade Agreement (NAFTA) during the Democratic primaries, calling the trade agreement "devastating" and "a big mistake". In February 2008, a Canadian diplomatic memo surfaced, which alleged that Obama's economic advisor Austan Goolsbee had met with Canadian consular officials in Chicago and told them to disregard Obama's campaign rhetoric regarding NAFTA, a charge the Obama campaign later denied (see Barack Obama presidential primary campaign, 2008#NAFTA controversy). Obama also noted that free trade comes with its own costs: he believes the displacement of Mexican farmers by more efficient American counterparts has led to increased immigration to the United States from that country.

=== Faith based programs ===
In July 2008, after winning the primary, Obama said that he wants to expand federal funding of faith-based programs and establish a "Council for Faith-Based and Neighborhood Partnerships". He specified that, under his plan, federal money given to places of worship could only be used on secular programs. In particular, he mentioned, on July 1 in Zanesville, Ohio, that "support for social services to the poor and the needy have consistently been underfunded". He went on to praise President Bush's efforts, but contended that the current administration's plan never managed to "rally the armies of compassion."

=== Government waste ===
On September 22, 2008, Obama said, "I am not a Democrat who believes that we can or should defend every government program just because it's there... We will fire government managers who aren't getting results, we will cut funding for programs that are wasting your money and we will use technology and lessons from the private sector to improve efficiency across every level of government... The only way we can do all this without leaving our children with an even larger debt is if Washington starts taking responsibility for every dime that it spends."

Early in the Obama administration, some became aware of a program that provided free cellphones and service to the poor, concluding it was a new Obama program and branded the phenomenon as "Obamaphones". This became an ongoing meme during the Obama presidency, supposedly representing how Obama was creating a welfare state. However, the cellphone program had begun in 2008, as an extension of the Universal Service Fund dating back to at least 1996, and is not funded with taxpayer money.

== See also ==
- Comparison of the 2008 United States presidential candidates
- List of Barack Obama 2008 presidential campaign endorsements
- Political positions of Joe Biden
- U.S. economic performance under Democratic and Republican presidents
