= Campaign rhetoric of Barack Obama =

The campaign rhetoric of Barack Obama is the rhetoric in the campaign speeches given by President of the United States, Barack Obama, between February 10, 2007, and November 5, 2008, for the 2008 presidential campaign. Obama became the 44th president after George W. Bush with running mate Joe Biden. In his campaign rhetoric, Obama used three main devices: motifs, American exceptionalism, and voicing.

== List of notable speeches ==
- July 27, 2004, Boston, MA: 2004 Democratic National Convention keynote address
- March 18, 2008, Philadelphia, PA: A More Perfect Union
- November 5, 2008, Chicago, IL: Barack Obama election victory speech, 2008

== Motifs ==
A motif is a rhetorical device that involves the repeated presence of a concept, which heightens its importance in a speech and draws attention to the idea. Obama's motifs became so recognizable that the main motifs, Change and Hope, became the themes for the 2008 presidential campaign of every candidate, from Senator Hillary Clinton and Senator John McCain.

=== Change ===
Change was Obama's fundamental motif in his campaign for Republican, Democratic, and undecided audiences. In addition to inspiring his Yes We Can campaign (2007) slogan, the ideology of change separated Obama from his opponents. During his campaign, change was the second most stated concept in Obama's speeches, falling behind the economy. Change also became a part of Obama's slogan, "Change we can believe in," which appeared on banners, podiums, and posters.

=== Hope ===
Hope supported the idea that change was possible and symbolized the hope that Obama could become the first African American president of the United States. Hope became another repeated topic and theme in the campaign, being the fourth most stated concept behind the economy, change, and security. Below is an example of hope as a motif from Obama's 2004 Democratic National Convention keynote address:

"Hope in the face of difficulty. Hope in the face of uncertainty. The audacity of hope!"

== American exceptionalism ==
American exceptionalism is a rhetorical device that elicits support from the audience and convinces listeners that the speaker can restore the United States to greatness. Using American exceptionalism promoted confidence in Obama, his campaign, and the national identity of the United States. American exceptionalism helped Obama establish a separation between the old administration and his new leadership.

Woodrow Wilson, Bill Clinton, and Ronald Reagan are other politicians known for their use of American exceptionalism to further the ideal that the United States is the hegemon of the world. Although related to patriotism, exceptionalism is a stronger belief that the United States is the exception to the rules of history.

=== Praise ===
Speakers can praise the United States and its greatness to draw pride from the audience. Below is an example of American exceptionalism from Obama on a campaign stop in Toledo, Ohio on October 13, 2008:

"I know these are difficult times. I know folks are worried. But I also know this - we can steer ourselves out of this crisis. Because we are the United States of America. We are the country that has faced down war and depression; great challenges and great threats. And at each and every moment, we have risen to meet these challenges - not as Democrats, not as Republicans, but as Americans. We still have the most talented, most productive workers of any country on Earth. We're still home to innovation and technology, colleges and universities that are the envy of the world. Some of the biggest ideas in history have come from our small businesses and our research facilities. It won't be easy, but there's no reason we can't make this century another American century."

This quote praises America's ability to rise against the odds. This gives them the hope and push that change can happen. Obama's use of exceptionalism became symbolic of a fight to restore and renew America back to its glory days and avoid the status quo.

=== Negation ===
American exceptionalism is also used in the form of negation, where the speaker describes what the United States is not. Negation exceptionalism promotes the greatness of the country by describing negative qualities the country does not embody. Obama used negation exceptionalism in a health care speech delivered in Newport News, Virginia on October 4, 2008:

"We are not a country that rewards hard work and perseverance with debt and worry. We've never been a country that lets major challenges go unsolved and unaddressed. And we are tired of watching as year after year, candidates offer up detailed health care plans with great fanfare and promise, only to see them crushed under the weight of Washington politics and drug and insurance lobbying once the campaign is over. That is not who we are. And that is not who we have to be."

This passage presents ideas that are contrary to the superiority and national autonomy of the United States of America, but by negating them, shows what the United States can hope to accomplish.

== Voicing ==
Voicing is using the voice of another within a speech to create proximity and credibility. Obama quoted famous Americans, such as Martin Luther King Jr., and personal stories from everyday Americans, which help the audience connect emotionally with the speech. Voicing is a powerful rhetorical device because the audience can engage in the speech by reacting through chants, cheers, and vocalizations Voicing changes the definitions of roles so that the speaker is not the only active participant.

In a January 26, 2008 speech in South Carolina, Obama told three stories of a woman struggling to make ends meet, a man who cannot find work, and a woman who is waiting for her son to return from Iraq. Obama was able to borrow the voices of these Americans in his speeches, making himself the speaker of and an audience member to these stories. Obama used pathos throughout this speech.

Other rhetorical devices Obama used in his campaign speeches were repetition, metaphor, personification, climax, and allusion.
