= Politics of resentment =

Form of politics

The politics of resentment, sometimes called grievance politics, describes strategies that convert perceived injustices into collective claims that can reorder party systems when globalization, demographic change, or state restructuring unsettle expectations, then channels them toward a concrete outgroup or elite. Researchers distinguish multiple channels through which actors translate anger into policy agendas, allowing analysts to compare movements across regions and election cycles. It is not confined to any one ideology or geography. It can be fused with populism, nationalism, cultural conservatism, or left protest. Scholars now treat it as an identifiable mode of political communication and organization with distinct psychological, sociological, and territorial drivers.

== Historical development ==
Political theorists trace the language of ressentiment to classical debates about moral injury and retaliation. Friedrich Nietzsche's genealogy of morality argued that lingering resentment stabilized counter-elite moralities in late antiquity, offering an early account of how wounded status claims become collective political projects. Max Scheler later expanded the concept to modern mass societies, describing ressentiment as a long-term psychic state that elites and counter-elites mobilize when hierarchies appear immovable.

Comparative historians identify recurring cycles of grievance-driven mobilization stretching from early modern Europe's urban guild protests to anti-colonial revolts and twentieth-century populisms. Recent scholarship links these legacies to contemporary nationalist and religious movements that frame perceived cultural humiliation as a call for democratic renovation.

=== Plague of Justinian ===
The Plague of Justinian (541-549 CE) generated significant grievance politics in the Byzantine Empire as the pandemic killed an estimated 25-50% of the population. The plague's impact was particularly severe among urban poor and rural peasants who lacked resources to flee infected areas, while wealthy elites could retreat to country estates. This disparity intensified existing resentment toward Constantinople's centralized authority. Local populations were outraged that imperial tax collectors continued demanding the full annona (grain tax) and chrysargyron (trade tax), even as agricultural production plummeted and commerce ground to a halt. Emperor Justinian's refusal to reduce the standard tax assessment on land, or suspend his costly building programs and military campaigns, sparked widespread anger. His 542 CE edict attempting to control wage inflation by capping laborers' pay at pre-plague levels, despite severe worker shortages, further inflamed tensions.

Religious grievances also emerged as different Christian factions interpreted the plague as divine punishment for their rivals' theological positions. Monophysite Christians in Egypt and Syria viewed the plague as judgment against Chalcedonian orthodoxy, while orthodox believers blamed religious dissent for bringing God's wrath. These grievance narratives contributed to weakening imperial authority and deepening sectarian divisions across the empire, demonstrating how black swan events act as a catalyst to activate and reshape existing patterns of social resentment.

=== Pre-Revolutionary France ===
In pre-revolutionary France, grievance politics emerged through institutionalized channels of complaint called cahiers de doléances (grievance notebooks), where the three estates documented their grievances against the monarchy and each other. The Third Estate's grievances centered on inequitable taxation, aristocratic privilege, and blocked social mobility, while the nobility expressed resentment over royal centralization and loss of traditional authority.

Urban intellectuals and professionals (bourgeoisie) developed sophisticated critiques of aristocratic privilege through Enlightenment discourse networks and salon culture. Their grievances focused on merit-based advancement, rational administration, and constitutional limits on royal power. Meanwhile, peasant grievances centered on seigneurial dues, ecclesiastical tithes, and tax burdens, expressed through both formal petitions and periodic revolts.

The convergence of these multi-layered resentments, intellectual, professional, and agrarian, created what historian François Furet called a "cascade of grievances" that delegitimized the old regime. When fiscal crisis forced the monarchy to convene the Estates General of 1789, these long-cultivated grievance narratives provided ready-made frames for revolutionary mobilization.

=== Contemporary United States ===
Field studies and survey experiments show that status threat and perceived distributive unfairness remain central to grievance politics in the United States. Researchers find that narratives of cultural displacement and partisan animus have reshaped party coalitions, motivating turnout and policy stances on trade, immigration, and social welfare.

First-party public opinion research reveals deep dissatisfaction with the U.S. political system, with only 4% saying it works very well and 63% expressing little to no confidence in its future. Trust in federal government stands at historic lows of 16%, while growing shares (28%) view both major parties unfavorably. This widespread disillusionment manifests in electoral dynamics, with 63% dissatisfied with emerging presidential candidates and only 26% rating the overall quality of political candidates positively, a 20 point decline since 2018. These sentiments fuel grievance-based appeals in campaign messaging and grassroots fundraising across the political spectrum.

== Grievance culture ==
Sociological work on moral cultures interprets contemporary grievance contests as strategic appeals to third parties, where aggrieved actors publicize offenses to recruit institutional allies. Campbell and Manning describe a transition toward a victimhood culture at the level of conflict tactics and moral judgment, building on Donald Black's general theory of conflict and moral time. This body of work analyzes how institutional complaint forums, microaggression discourse, and reputational sanctions reorganize conflict processing.

== Geographic manifestations ==
=== United States ===
In the U.S., politics of resentment has mixed roots. Cramer's rural consciousness captures place based narratives about unfairness, while status threat and identity protection explain why demographic and cultural change can feel like loss. Platform incentives and outrage media then amplify and coordinate these sentiments at scale.

=== United Kingdom ===
Post-crisis Britain saw the pairing of austerity era grievances with territorial resentments and anti-EU frames. Empirical work links import competition and deindustrialization to higher Leave shares, which were then narrated as taking back control from distant elites.

=== Central Europe ===
Studies of Hungary and Poland document strategic hijacking of victimhood by governing elites. Leaders invert victimizer and victim roles, portray dominant groups as besieged, and weaponize historical injury to justify illiberal measures, including culture war campaigns and pressure on independent institutions.

=== India ===
Work on Hindu nationalism shows long cultivation of narratives of Hindu injury and disrespect that legitimate majoritarian politics. Analysts argue that victimhood motifs, fused with development promises and identity consolidation, have been central to recent mobilization and statecraft.

=== Brazil and Philippines ===
Anti-corruption and anti-crime grievance frames powered Jair Bolsonaro in Brazil and Rodrigo Duterte in the Philippines. These frames converted anger at perceived impunity and disorder into mandates for punitive or illiberal policies, with communication strategies that personalized enemies and dramatized retribution.

== Types ==
=== Male ===
Male grievance politics interpret social change through male status threat, aggrieved entitlement, and perceived emasculation. Typical characteristics include narratives of lost authority in intimate, workplace, and public spheres, and retaliatory or restitutive claims about order and respect. Representative parties none, the pattern is documented across violent subcultures and appears in masculinist currents within varied movements. Research on mass public violence and masculinity reports recurrent grievance repertoires and entitlement themes.

=== Female ===
Female grievance politics denotes mobilization by women organized around perceived sex-based disadvantage or moral threat, often expressed either as feminist protection and dignity claims or as anti-feminist defense of family order. Characteristics include maternalist language, claims about safety and reproduction, and institutional campaigns around education and sexuality policy. Representative parties and movements include conservative women's networks and feminist advocacy coalitions within broader party systems. Research documents women-led conservative activism in the postwar United States and analyzes contemporary contestation between popular feminism and popular misogyny in media politics.

=== White ===
White grievance politics centers claims of status loss and perceived reverse discrimination among white populations, often in response to immigration, civil rights enforcement, or diversity policies. Characteristics include identity salience, zero-sum threat perception, and programmatic opposition to redistributive or multicultural policy frames. Representative parties include segments of the U.S. Republican Party and European right-populist parties where white or nativist identity is a core electoral pivot. Research in political behavior links white identity strength and status threat to partisan alignment and vote choice.

==== Reaction to demographic change ====
A subfield of white grievance research focuses on reactions to demographic change in the United States, especially projected shifts toward majority-minority populations. Characteristics include heightened perceived status threat and politicization of immigration and voting rules. Representative parties include U.S. and European right-populist actors that campaign on immigration restriction and cultural protection. Research documents how demographic projections and cohort replacement structure identity-centered voting and urban-suburban realignment.

=== Black ===
Black grievance politics aggregates claims about historic exclusion, unequal protection, and state violence, and is structured by group consciousness that political scientist Michael Dawson conceptualized as linked fate. Characteristics include protest cycles against police violence, institutional reform agendas, and coalition politics within mainstream parties. Representative parties and movements include the Movement for Black Lives, civil rights organizations, and participation within the U.S. Democratic Party coalition. Research shows how protest shifts elite agendas and how group-based identity links to policy preferences and participation.

=== Nationalist ===
Nationalist grievance politics fuses ethnocultural majority identity with anti-elite and anti-outsider frames. Characteristics include border fortification demands, welfare chauvinism, and delegitimation of pluralist institutions. Representative parties include Rassemblement National in France, Alternative for Germany, Lega in Italy, Fidesz in Hungary, and segments of Law and Justice in Poland. Research conceptualizes these formations as ethnonationalist populism that mobilizes collective resentment and documents value-conflict realignment across Western electorates.

=== Religious ===
Religious grievance politics frames secularization, moral deregulation, or perceived persecution as collective injury that warrants political restoration of religious authority. Characteristics include moral legislation programs, education control, and church-party linkages. Representative parties include Law and Justice in Poland, Fidesz in Hungary, and Turkey's Justice and Development Party in contexts where church or mosque networks intersect party strategy. Comparative research explains how and when churches and religious movements shape policy, and how state secularism regimes structure conflict and grievance translation into institutions.

=== Postcolonial ===
Postcolonial grievance politics articulates anti-imperial and anti-colonial claims about extraction, epistemic domination, and national dignity, and often maps those claims onto contemporary party projects. Characteristics include decolonization rhetoric, restitution demands, and sovereignty-centered economic policy. Representative parties and movements include Hindu nationalist projects in India and other formations in the global south that situate programmatic aims in colonial legacies. Foundational and contemporary research theorizes violence, state formation, and postcolony power as responses to colonial domination and its afterlives.

=== Sexuality and gender ===
Sexuality and gender grievance politics frames gender equality, LGBTQ rights, and sex education as threats to family and national order. Characteristics include anti-gender ideology narratives, campaigns against sexual minority rights, and linkage with nationalist or religious projects. Representative parties include Law and Justice in Poland, Fidesz in Hungary, and Vox in Spain where anti-gender frames are integrated into party agendas. Research maps the transnational diffusion of anti-gender mobilizations and their interactions with populist parties and church networks.

== See also ==
- Identity politics
- Moral panic
- Populism
- Ressentiment
- Siege mentality
- Victim mentality
- Civil war
- Pessimism porn
