= Camille Zubrinsky Charles =

American sociologist

Camille Z. Charles is an American sociologist. She serves as Walter H. and Leonore C. Annenberg Professor in the Social Sciences, Professor of Sociology, Africana Studies & Education and Director of the Center for Africana Studies at the University of Pennsylvania. She served as the first chair of Penn's Africana Studies Department, founded in 2012.

== Education ==
Charles graduated from California State University-Sacramento, then earned a master's degree and a Ph.D. in sociology from the University of California at Los Angeles.

== Works ==
- The Source of the River: The Social Origins of Freshmen at America's Selective Colleges and Universities with Douglas S. Massey, Garvey Lundy and Mary J. Fischer (Princeton University Press, 2003)
- Won't You Be My Neighbor? Race, Class and Residence in Los Angeles (Russell Sage, Fall 2006)
- Taming the River: Negotiating the Academic, Financial, and Social Currents in Selective Colleges and Universities with Mary J. Fischer, Margarita A. Mooney and Douglas S. Massey (Princeton University Press, 2009)
- "Race in the American Mind: From the Moynihan Report to the Obama Candidacy" with Lawrence Bobo
