= Jewish Council (disambiguation) =

Jewish Council usually refers to a Judenrat, the name for administrative bodies established in German-occupied Europe during World War II to represent Jews.

Jewish Council may also refer to:

- Jewish Council of Australia, an Australian organisation representing progressive Jewish voices
- Jewish Council for Education & Research, a defunct American political organisation (2008–2012)
- Jewish Council for Public Affairs, an American organisation based in New York that advocates for progressive and liberal policies
- Jewish Council for Racial Equality, former name of HIAS+JCORE, a British organisation which advocates for refugee and asylum seeker issues
- Jewish Council on Urban Affairs, an American organisation based in Chicago that advocates for racial and economic justice

== See also ==
- Jewish councils in Hungary
