= Ann Nixon Cooper =

American activist (1902–2009)

- Born: Ann Louise Nixon; January 9, 1902; Shelbyville, Tennessee, U.S.
- Died: December 21, 2009 (aged 107); Atlanta, Georgia, U.S.
- Occupation: Activist
- Known for: Invoked in President Barack Obama's 2008 victory speech

Ann Louise Nixon Cooper (January 9, 1902 – December 21, 2009) was an American centenarian best known for being invoked in United States President-elect Barack Obama's November 2008 election speech as someone who had witnessed "the struggle and the progress" of the past century, and as a representative of the change in status that African-Americans and women have achieved in America. Before that, she was a noted member of the Atlanta African-American community and an activist for civil rights.

== Biography ==
Cooper was born in Shelbyville, Tennessee, on January 9, 1902, and raised in Nashville. She moved to Atlanta, Georgia, in her early-twenties with her husband, Albert Berry Cooper, a dentist, and they had four children together. During that time, she served more than fifty years in public work on the board of Gate City Nursery Association and also helped found the Girls Club for African-American Youth. Because there were no integrated Boy Scout troops in 1930s Atlanta, she wrote to the Boy Scouts in New York for help in starting Troop 95, Atlanta's first Boy Scout troop for African-Americans. When her husband died, Martin Luther King Jr. sent Cooper a telegram; she also met with Coretta Scott King and saved photographs of the occasion. Cooper first registered to vote on September 1, 1941. Although she was friends with elite Black Atlantans like W. E. B. Du Bois, John Hope Franklin and Benjamin Mays, she did not exercise her right to vote for years, because of her status as a black woman in a segregated and sexist society.

During the 1970s, she served as a tutor to non-readers at Ebenezer Baptist Church. She also served on the Friends of the Library Board, serving at one time as vice president of the board. In 1980, she received a Community Service Award from Channel 11 for being one of the organizers of the black Cub Scouts and serving as the first den mother for three and a half years.

She was also awarded the Annie L. McPheeters Medallion for community service from the Auburn Avenue Research Library on African American Culture and History in 2002.

Her grandson is Lawrence D. Bobo, the W. E. B. Du Bois Professor of the Social Sciences and the Dean of Social Science at Harvard University.

== Age issue ==
When featured in Obama's 2008 speech, Cooper was 106 years old. Some news outlets erroneously reported her as "oldest voter" even though there were several older voters, including then-114-year-old Gertrude Baines, 113-year-old Beatrice Farve, 112-year-olds Maggie Renfro and George Francis, 110-year-olds Virginia Call and Onie Ponder, and 109-year-olds Nettie Whittington and Amanda Jones (all voted for Obama); and 112-year-olds Eunice Sanborn, Besse Cooper, and Walter Breuning (all indicated they likely voted for McCain) and 109-year-old Gertrude Noone (who voted for McCain).

Cooper died on December 21, 2009, three weeks before what would have been her 108th birthday.

Census research suggests she may have been a year younger than claimed; the 1910 U.S. census lists her as seven years old in April 1910. Given a January birthdate, this suggests that she was born in 1903.

== See also ==
- Virginia McLaurin
