= Du Bois Review =

- Discipline: Social science
- Language: English
- Edited by: Lawrence D. Bobo, Michael C. Dawson

Publication details
- History: 2004-present
- Publisher: Cambridge University Press
- Frequency: Biannually

Standard abbreviations
- ISO 4: Du Bois Rev.

Indexing
- ISSN: 1742-058X (print); 1742-0598 (web)
- LCCN: 2004235743

Links
- Journal homepage; Journal's page at publisher's website

The Du Bois Review: Social Science Research on Race is a peer-reviewed academic journal covering multidisciplinary and multicultural social science research and criticism about race. The journal was established in 2004 and is published by Cambridge University Press for the W. E. B. Du Bois Institute for African and African American Research at Harvard University. The journal covers a range of disciplines, including economics, political science, sociology, anthropology, law, communications, public policy, psychology, linguistics, and history.

== Structure and contents ==
Each issue of the Du Bois Review contains four major sections:

- The first is a "Statement from the Editors" that provides a commentary on the state and the study of race as well as an overview of the issue.
- The second section, "State of the Discipline", presents lead essays that synthetically critique broad areas of research regarding race.
- The third section, "State of the Art", offers three to five major research articles. These articles are peer reviewed and rival the quality of those published in the best journals in the social sciences.
- The fourth section, "State of the Discourse", comprises major review essays, each of which comments on two to four seminal books, controversies, and/or strands of research in the study of race. The essays exploring controversies present the various sides of critical debate within society as well as the scholarly study of race.

== Editors ==
The editors-in-chief are Lawrence D. Bobo (Harvard University) and Michael C. Dawson (University of Chicago).

== Abstracting and indexing ==
The journal is abstracted and/or indexed in: CSA Worldwide Political Science Abstracts, PAIS International, ProQuest Research Library, Sociological Abstracts, SocINDEX, and Scopus.
