= Lawrence D. Bobo =

American professor (born 1958)

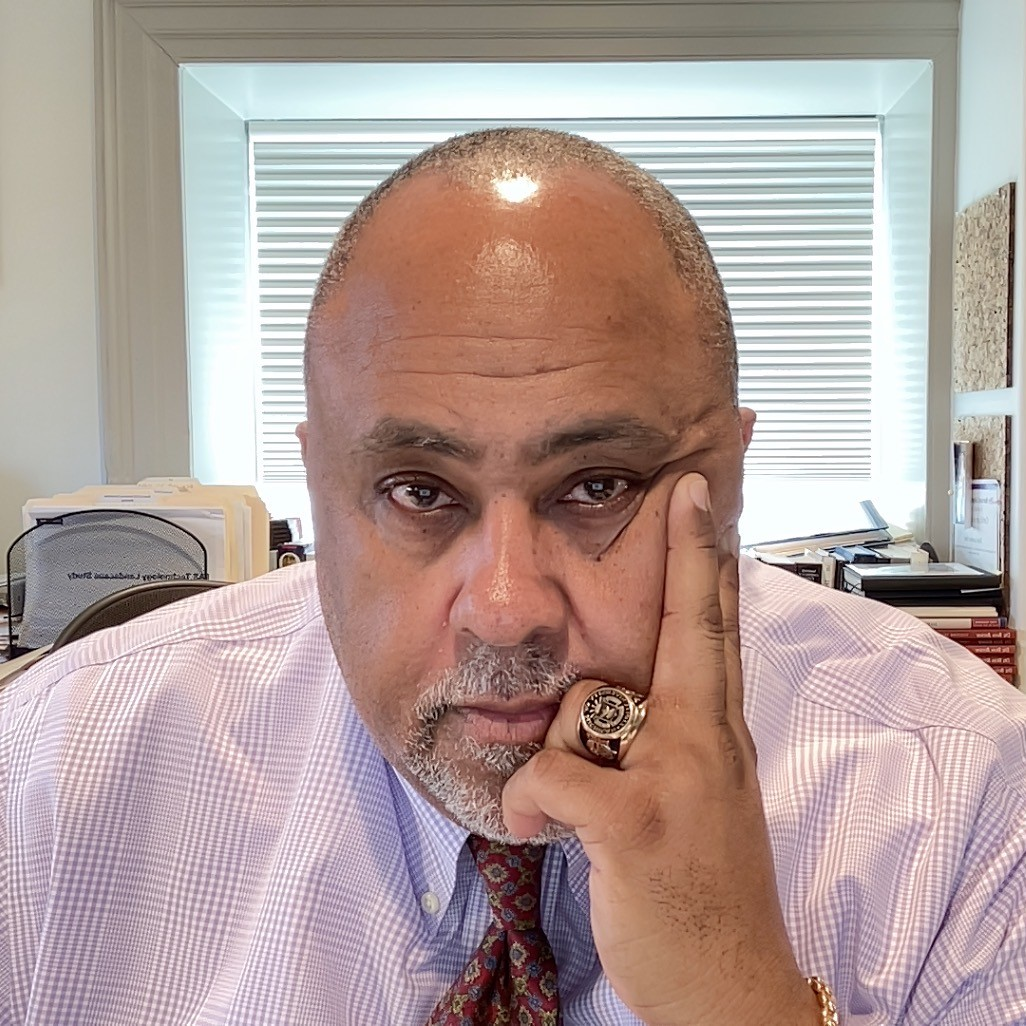
- Born: February 18, 1958 (age 68)
- Occupations: Professor; dean
- Title: W. E. B. Du Bois Professor of the Social Sciences

Academic background
- Education: Loyola Marymount University (B.A.); University of Michigan (M.A., Ph.D.)

Academic work
- Institutions: Harvard University; Stanford University; University of California, Los Angeles; University of Wisconsin, Madison
- Notable students: Camille Z. Charles

Lawrence D. Bobo is the W. E. B. Du Bois Professor of the Social Sciences at Harvard University. His research focuses on the intersection of social psychology, social inequality, politics, and race.

== Early life and education ==
Bobo, who is of African American heritage, is the second of three sons born to Joseph R. Bobo Sr., a graduate of Meharry Medical College and once the chief of minor trauma at USC County Medical Hospital in Los Angeles, California, and Joyce Cooper Bobo, a longtime teacher in the Los Angeles Unified School District.

His maternal grandmother was Ann Nixon Cooper, the 106-year-old Atlanta woman Barack Obama mentioned in his victory speech in Grant Park, Chicago, upon his election as president in 2008. Bobo wrote of his relationship with her in a blog post for The Root at the time of her death.

Bobo grew up in the San Fernando Valley, living in Pacoima when young and in Granada Hills in his teenage years, attending public schools in the Los Angeles Unified School District from kindergarten through high school. He graduated magna cum laude from Loyola Marymount University with his Bachelor of Arts degree in sociology in 1979. He received his Master of Arts degree in 1981 and Doctor of Philosophy degree in 1984, both in sociology, from the University of Michigan.

== Career ==
Bobo has held tenured appointments in the sociology departments at the University of Wisconsin, Madison (1989–1991), University of California, Los Angeles (1993–1997), Stanford University (2005–2007), and Harvard University (1997–2004, 2008–present).

He is a founding editor of the Du Bois Review, published by Cambridge University Press. He co-authored the book Racial Attitudes in America: Trends and Interpretations and is a senior editor of Prismatic Metropolis: Inequality in Los Angeles. His most recent book, Prejudice in Politics: Group Position, Public Opinion, and the Wisconsin Treaty Rights Dispute, was a finalist for the 2007 C. Wright Mills Award.

Bobo is an elected member of the National Academy of Sciences and a Fellow of the American Academy of Arts and Sciences and the American Association for the Advancement of Science. He is a Guggenheim Fellow, an Alphonse M. Fletcher Sr. Fellow, a Fellow of the Center for Advanced Study in the Behavioral Sciences, and a Russell Sage Foundation Visiting Scholar. As of 2024, he chairs the board of directors of the American Institutes for Research. From 2018 to 2025, Bobo chaired the division of social sciences within the Harvard Faculty of Arts and Sciences.

In June 2024, Bobo authored a Harvard Crimson op-ed arguing that Harvard should sanction faculty members who "excoriate University leadership, faculty, staff, or students with the intent to arouse external intervention into University business". His essay was widely criticized by faculty at Harvard and other universities, the Foundation for Individual Rights and Expression, and the Wall Street Journal editorial board. Ten members of the Council on Academic Freedom at Harvard responded to Bobo in another Crimson op-ed, calling his arguments "downright alarming" and "clear infringements on academic freedom".

== Personal life ==
Bobo was married to Marcyliena Morgan, the Founding Director of the Hiphop Archive and Research Institute in the Hutchins Center for African and African American Research at Harvard University, until her death in September 2025.

They lived in the Brattle District of Cambridge, Massachusetts, in a home originally designed by Lois Howe in 1898. Bobo and Morgan remodeled the home, contracting with architect Mary Ann Thompson and consulting on the kitchen design with chefs Jody Adams and Aaron Sanchez. The remodeled Victorian has received recognition and awards.

== Awards and honors ==
- Warren J. Mitofsky Award for Excellence in Public Opinion Research, The Roper Center, University of Connecticut (2021)
- Award for Exceptionally Distinguished Achievement, American Association for Public Opinion Research (2020)
- Phi Beta Kappa (Alumni Member), Omega Chapter of California, Loyola Marymount University (2020)
- Outstanding Book Award, American Association for Public Opinion Research (for Prejudice in Politics) (2018)
- W.E.B. Du Bois Fellow, American Association of Political and Social Science (2017)
- Charles Horton Cooley-George Herbert Mead Award for a Career of Distinguished Scholarship in Sociological Social Psychology, American Sociological Association (2012)
- Outstanding Book Award, American Association for Public Opinion Research (for Racial Attitudes in America) (2005)

== Selected bibliography ==
=== Books ===
- Bobo, Lawrence D.; Tuan, Mia (2006). Prejudice in Politics: Group Position, Public Opinion, and the Wisconsin Treaty Rights Dispute. Cambridge: Harvard University Press. ISBN 9780674013292.
- Bobo, Lawrence D. (ed.) (2003). Race, Racism, and Discrimination. Social Psychology Quarterly special issue 66(4).
- Bobo, Lawrence; O'Connor, Alice; Tilly, Chris (eds.) (2001). Urban Inequality: Evidence From Four Cities. New York: Russell Sage Foundation. ISBN 9780871546517.
- Bobo, Lawrence; Oliver, Melvin L.; Johnson, James H.; Valenzuela, Abel (eds.) (2000). Prismatic Metropolis: Inequality in Los Angeles. New York: Russell Sage Foundation. ISBN 9780871541307.
- Bobo, Lawrence D.; Sears, David O.; Sidanius, James (eds.) (2000). Racialized Politics: The Debate about Racism in America. Chicago: University of Chicago Press. ISBN 9780226744070.
- Bobo, Lawrence D. (ed.) (1997). Race, Public Opinion and Society. Public Opinion Quarterly special issue 61(1).
- Bobo, Lawrence D.; Krysan, Maria; Schuman, Howard; Steeh, Charlotte (1997). Racial Attitudes in America: Trends and Interpretations. Cambridge: Harvard University Press. ISBN 9780674745698.

=== Book chapters ===
- Bobo, Lawrence D.; Smith, Ryan A. (1994), "Antipoverty policy, affirmative action and racial attitudes", in Danziger, Sheldon H.; Sandefur, Gary D.; Weinberg, Daniel H. (eds.), Confronting poverty: prescriptions for change, New York Cambridge, Massachusetts: Russell Sage Foundation Harvard University Press, pp. 365–395, ISBN 9780674160811.
