= New Energy for America =

Plan for oil prices and renewable energy promoted by Barack Obama

New Energy For America

New Energy for America was a plan led by President Barack Obama and Vice President Joe Biden beginning in 2008 to invest in renewable energy sources, reduce reliance on foreign oil, address global warming issues, and create jobs for Americans. The main objective of the New Energy for America plan was to implement clean energy sources in the United States to switch from nonrenewable resources to renewable resources. The plan led by the Obama Administration aimed to implement short-term solutions to provide immediate relief from pain at the pump, and mid- to- long-term solutions to provide a New Energy for America plan. The goals of the clean energy plan hoped to: invest in renewable technologies that will boost domestic manufacturing and increase homegrown energy, invest in training for workers of clean technologies, strengthen the middle class, and help the economy.

== History ==
The term "New Energy for America" was first used on July 28, 2004, at an event in downtown Boston that gathered leaders from labor, government, business, and the environmental community to discuss how the "new energy" economy is critical for the future. This event raised awareness for the need for renewable energy and suggested that the new energy economy is about jobs, national security, public health, and the planet left behind for future generations.

The plan was presented by Barack Obama's presidential campaign in 2008.

President Barack Obama, in his inaugural address called for the expanded use of renewable energy to meet the twin challenges of energy security and climate change.

In 2009, the Obama Administration made an effort to allow homeowners to finance solar and energy improvements without cost upfront, also known as PACE (Property-Assessed Clean Energy); They collaborated with the Middle Class Task Force to create a Policy Framework for PACE Financing Programs.

Obama issued a pair of memoranda on January 26, 2009, to publish higher fuel economy standards for the model year 2011 cars and light trucks by the end of March and lower greenhouse gas emissions (to revisit a California waiver request that would allow that state to implement its own greenhouse gas emission rules for vehicles).

In June 2014, the Clean Power Plan was proposed by the Environmental Protection Agency (EPA) to the Obama Administration. The plan hoped to fight global warming and was approved by President Obama on August 3, 2015.

On July 19, 2016, the Obama Administration announced a partnership between the Clean Energy Savings For All Initiative and the Departments of Energy (DOE), Housing and Urban Development (HUD), Agriculture (USDA), Health and Human Services (HHS), Veteran's Affairs (V.A.), and the Environmental Protection Agency (EPA). This plan hoped to increase access to solar energy and promote energy efficiency in low-to-moderate income communities.

== Content ==
The plan aimed to:

- Help create five million new jobs by investing $150 billion over the next ten years to encourage private efforts to develop clean energy sources and technology.
- Save more oil than the United States currently imports from the Middle East and Venezuela combined within 10 years.
- Put 1 million plug-in hybrid cars on the road by 2015, with emphasis on cars built in the United States.
- Generate 10 percent of the United States' electricity through renewable sources (renewable electricity) by 2012 and 25 percent by 2025.
- Implement a cap-and-trade program to help reduce greenhouse gas emissions 80 percent by 2050.

=== Short-term solutions ===
The New Energy for America plan offered three short-term solutions. These solutions were meant to help Americans through the immediate crisis when energy prices were high.

- The first solution would be to provide emergency energy rebates. This would be achieved by requiring oil companies to take a share of their profits and provide relief worth $500 per individual and $1000 per couple to help families cope with the rising gas and electricity prices.
- The second solution would be to enact legislation to prevent oil companies from unfairly raising prices.
- The third solution would be to release oil from the Strategic Petroleum Reserve. Obama and Biden supported releasing oil from the reserve and replacing it with oil that would benefit Americans in the long term while lowering oil prices.

=== Mid- to long-term solutions ===
The New Energy for America plan offered six mid to long-term solutions. Taken together, these proposals would help resolve the issue of global climate change and ensure America became less dependent on foreign oil.

- Deal with climate change by implementing a cap-and-trade program to reduce greenhouse gas emissions, and developing a similar global program with the United Nations Framework Convention on Climate Change (UNFCCC).
- Investing in a secure energy future,
  - (1) by investing $150 billion over ten years to develop 5 million new green jobs,
  - (2) by creating a new “Green Vet Initiative” that would help military veterans enter the new energy economy,
  - (3) by converting manufacturing companies into centers that would help Americans learn skills related to producing new energy products, and
  - (4) by directing funds to federal workplace training programs that would be centered on green technology, advanced manufacturing, and weatherization training.
- Make cars, trucks, and SUVs fuel-efficient by increasing fuel economy standards by 4% every year. There would also be a greater number of fuel-efficient vehicles by giving domestic automakers $4 billion retooling tax credits and loan guarantees. Congress and auto companies would work to ensure that all new vehicles have FFV capability of running on clean alternative fuel and to establish a national Low Carbon Fuel Standard (LCFS) that would introduce low-carbon non-petroleum fuels.
- Promote domestic energy supply by making oil companies drill in open areas on land they already have access to - or make them sell to another company that will. America would also prioritize constructing the Alaska Gas Pipeline and getting more oil from existing oil fields within the US.
- Diversify America's energy sources by
  - (1) requiring 10% of electricity consumed in the US to come from clean energy sources by 2012,
  - (2) developing and commercializing clean coal technology, and
  - (3) securing nuclear power and making sure waste from reactor sites is contained.
- Reduce energy use and costs by
  - (1) implementing a program that would work to reduce electricity usage,
  - (2) providing more resources to the Department of Energy so they stop missing deadlines that have cost Americans millions of dollars,
  - (3) reducing federal energy consumption,
  - (4) requiring states to conduct proceedings that implement incentive changes and offer assistance to utility companies,
  - (5) investing in a Unified Smart Grid to better transmit and monitor energy, and lavishly funding LIHEAP so that it will give heating assistance to low-income families during the winter, and
  - (6) investing in repairing roads and bridges while encouraging public transportation.

== Implementation ==
Though the New Energy for America plan was never fully implemented as originally announced, many parts of the plan were implemented through various later-developed acts, plans, and executive orders throughout Barack Obama’s time as president.

=== The American Recovery and Reinvestment Act of 2009 ===
The first pieces of the New Energy for America plan put into action were done so through the American Recovery and Reinvestment Act of 2009, that was introduced to combat the effects of the Great Recession of 2008 and signed into law by President Obama. The policies implemented included $90 billion towards government investments, and tax incentives that promoted job creation and laid a solid foundation for clean energy. An additional $150 billion was leveraged in private and other non-federal capital for clean energy investments, resulting in more significant solar and wind power usage.

Although these plans have different names, parts of the Recovery Act sought to achieve the same goals as the New Energy for America plan. The U.S. Department of Energy invested the funds from the Recovery Act into six main categories, which included:

Increasing energy efficiency, by weatherizing and increasing energy usage efficiency in over 650,000 low-income family homes across the U.S.

Upgrading the transportation system, with money invested into American companies to stimulate the growth of the electric car industry, and increasing the number of electric vehicle charging stations in the U.S. from fewer than 500 to over 18,000 by 2012.

Over 20,000 projects renewable energy projects were funded through tax cuts or cash assistance for clean energy manufacturing and production led to a doubling of U.S. renewable energy by 2012.

Smart grid infrastructure was advanced, by investing in a modernized grid and building a safe and secure nationwide electrical system that allows access to renewable energy sources and uses smart meters for consumers to manage their energy use better.

Deeper innovative research, through funding high-risk, high reward key research through the ARPA-E program.

Cleaning up U.S. nuclear waste; the Office of Environmental Management used these funds to decrease the United States’ nuclear carbon footprint by 69% throughout the Recovery Act.

In September 2009, Barack Obama allowed the United States Environmental Protection Agency to move forward with rules that heavily regulate greenhouse gas emissions from hundreds of power plants and large industrial facilities.

=== Presidential Climate Action Plan ===
President Barack Obama adapted further climate goals from the original New Energy for America plan into the Presidential Climate Action Plan. The Climate Action Plan, last announced in June 2013, was a series of executive programs that included regulations to cut domestic carbon emissions, to prepare the U.S. for impending effects of climate change, and to work internationally to address climate change.

President Donald Trump repealed Obama's Climate Action Plan on his first day of office, asserting the plan was harmful to the economy.

President Joe Biden, rescinded the Trump plan on his first day of office, and restored the Presidential Climate Action Plan.

=== Recorded Impact ===
On June 29, 2017, the center-left think tank Center for American Progress released a study on the changes in U.S. energy usage climate impact between 2008 and 2016. The study found:

- Energy reliance on coal went down over 18%, changing the dominant source of U.S. electric supply from coal to natural gas.
- Renewable energy grew significantly Between 2008 and 2016, led by solar and wind power.
- There was significant job creation from improvements in energy efficiency and clean energy production.

== See also ==
- American Recovery and Reinvestment Plan
- Clean Air Act
- Corporate Average Fuel Economy (CAFE)
- Energy Independence and Security Act of 2007
- Energy Policy of the Obama Administration
- United States energy independence
- Infrastructure Investment and Jobs Act
- Inflation Reduction Act
