= Barack Obama 2008 presidential campaign =

American political campaign

Obama for America
- 2008 Obama–Biden campaign logo 2008 Obama presidential campaign logo
- Campaign: 2008 Democratic primaries 2008 U.S. presidential election
- Candidate: Barack Obama; U.S. Senator from Illinois (2005–2008); Joe Biden; U.S. Senator from Delaware (1973–2009)
- Affiliation: Democratic Party
- Status: Announced: February 10, 2007; Presumptive nominee: June 3, 2008; Official nominee: August 27, 2008; Won election: November 4, 2008; Certification: January 8, 2009; Inaugurated: January 20, 2009
- Headquarters: 233 North Michigan Avenue; Chicago, Illinois 60601
- Key people: David Plouffe (manager); Penny Pritzker (finance); David Axelrod (media); Michael Slaby (chief technology officer); Robert Gibbs (communications); Bill Burton (spokesman); Henry De Sio (chief operating officer); Claire McCaskill (co-chair); Tim Kaine (co-chair); Paul Hodes (co-chair)
- Receipts: US$670.7 million (November 24, 2008)
- Slogan
- Chant: Yes We Can; Fired up! Ready to go!

Website
- www.barackobama.com (Archived)

Barack Obama, then junior United States senator from Illinois, announced his candidacy for president of the United States on February 10, 2007, in Springfield, Illinois. After winning a majority of delegates in the Democratic primaries of 2008, on August 23, leading up to the convention, the campaign announced that Senator Joe Biden of Delaware would be the vice presidential nominee. At the 2008 Democratic National Convention on August 27, Barack Obama was formally selected as the Democratic Party nominee for president of the United States in 2008. He was the first African American in history to be nominated on a major party ticket. On November 4, 2008, Obama defeated the Republican nominee, Senator John McCain of Arizona, making him the president-elect and the first African American elected president.

Obama was the third sitting U.S. senator, after Warren G. Harding and John F. Kennedy, to be elected president. Upon the vote of the Electoral College on December 15, 2008, and the subsequent certification thereof by a Joint Session of the United States Congress on January 8, 2009, Barack Obama was elected as president and Joe Biden as vice president, with 365 of 538 electors. He also became the first president to not be born in the contiguous United States, as he was born in Hawaii.

Many pundits have considered Obama's 2008 campaign to be one of the greatest political underdog stories in U.S. history. The campaign is credited for shifting the status quo of the Democratic platform, especially on issues such as healthcare reform. Prior to 2007, Obama was largely unknown on a national level outside of his Senate constituency in Illinois. His primary victory over Hillary Clinton is considered one of the greatest political upsets of all time, as Clinton had an early lead in the polls and was expected to secure the nomination early on. In the general election, overwhelming backing by two-thirds of voters aged 18–29 and minority voters (66% of Hispanic voters and 95% of Black voters) were considered the most crucial demographic victories for Obama. Analysts also praised his campaign's effective use of the Internet in general and social media in particular, and considered their utilization of both a crucial factor in Obama's victory.

== End of the primaries ==
On June 3, 2008, after the Montana and South Dakota primaries, he secured enough delegates to clinch the nomination of the Democratic Party for President of the United States. His opponent in the general election, Republican John McCain, passed the delegate threshold to become the apparent nominee of his party on March 4. On June 7, Hillary Clinton, Obama's remaining opponent in the quest for the Democratic nomination, conceded defeat and urged her supporters to back Obama. After a June 26 dinner at which Obama encouraged his fundraisers to donate to Clinton's debt-saddled campaign, Obama and Clinton ran their first post-primary event together in Unity, New Hampshire, on June 27. Over the first two weeks of July, the campaign ran a heavier schedule of fundraising events, drawing from former donors to Clinton's campaign. Obama strategically had pictures made with financial experts Warren Buffett and Paul Volcker so the public would perceive him as having inside knowledge of Wall Street.

== Running mate ==
Obama's vice presidential running mate had been a subject of speculation since the end of the primaries. As of August 2008, some of the most popular choices for vice president included, but were not limited to, New York Senator Hillary Clinton, Delaware Senator Joe Biden, Indiana Senator Evan Bayh, Kansas Governor Kathleen Sebelius, Virginia Governor Tim Kaine, retired General and former Secretary of State Colin Powell, New Mexico Governor Bill Richardson, and retired General Wesley Clark.

On August 21, 2008, Obama announced that he had made a selection for his running mate, but would not reveal until August 23 who it was. Obama's campaign encouraged supporters to sign up for a text messaging system that would alert them the moment he announced his choice.

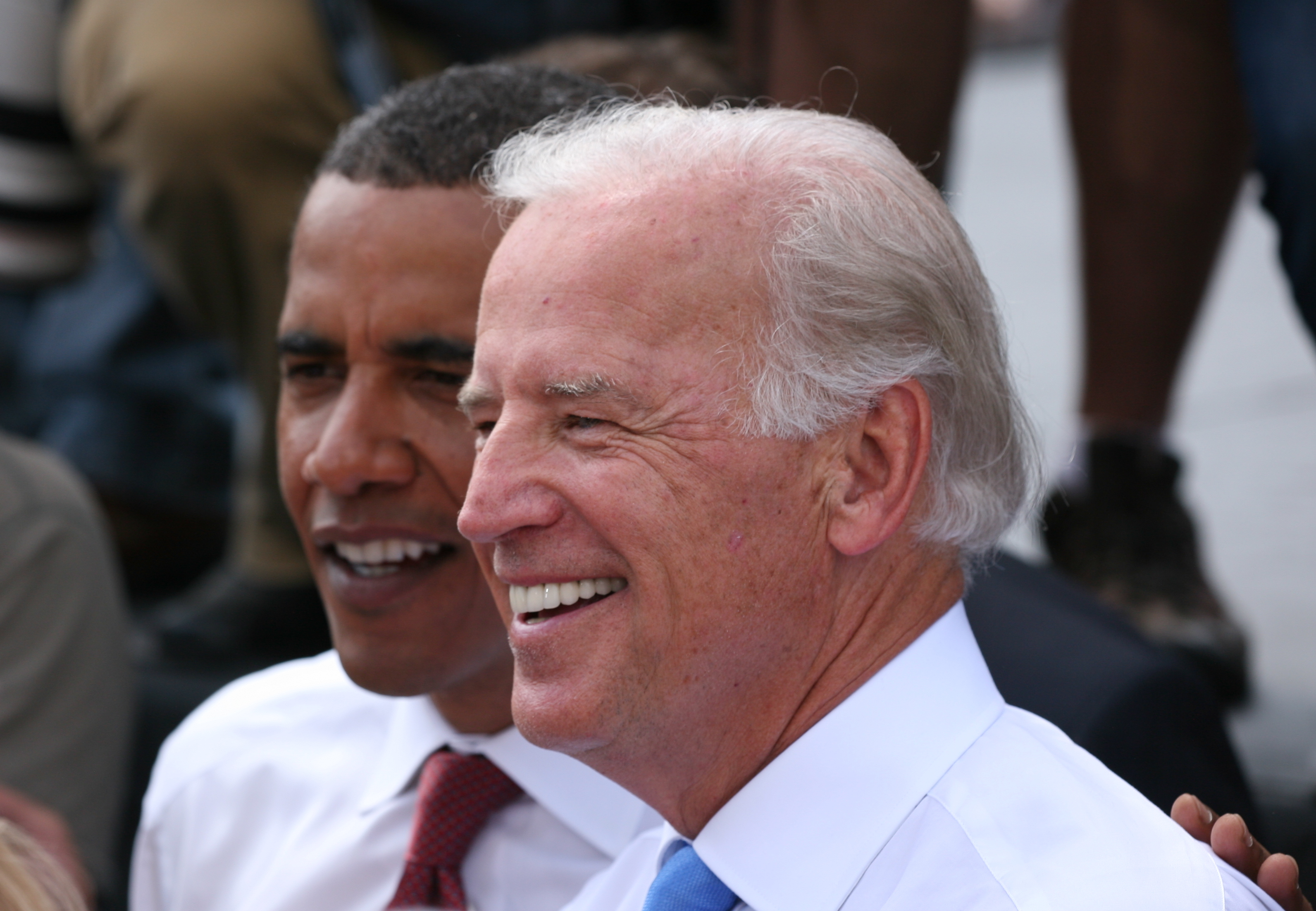
Joe Biden and Barack Obama after the presentation of Biden as the vice presidential running mate in Springfield, Illinois

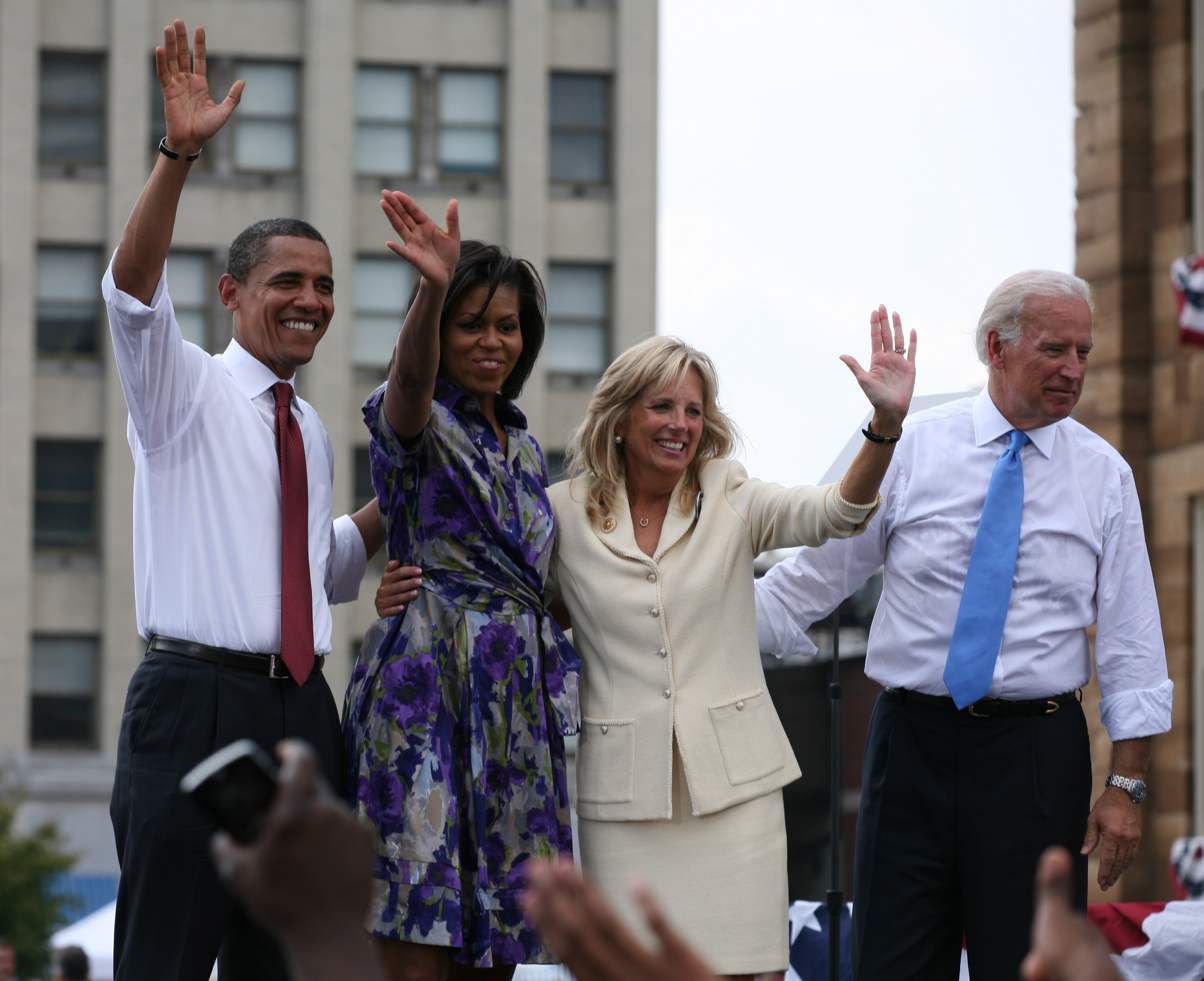
Barack Obama, Michelle Obama, Jill Biden and Joe Biden at the vice presidential announcement on August 23, 2008, in Springfield, Illinois

=== Biden's role in the campaign ===
Shortly after Biden withdrew from the presidential race, Obama privately told him he was interested in finding an important place for Biden in his administration. Biden declined Obama's first request to vet him for the vice-presidential slot, fearing the vice presidency would represent a loss in status and voice from his Senate position, but he later changed his mind. In early August, Obama and Biden met in secret to discuss the possibility, and developed a strong personal rapport. On August 23, 2008, Obama announced that Biden would be his running mate. The New York Times reported that the strategy behind the choice reflected a desire to fill out the ticket with someone with foreign policy and national security experience—and not to help the ticket win a swing state or to emphasize Obama's "change" message. Others pointed out Biden's appeal to middle-class and blue-collar voters, as well as his willingness to aggressively challenge Republican nominee John McCain in a way that Obama seemed uncomfortable doing at times. In accepting Obama's offer, Biden ruled out running for president again in 2016, but his comments in later years seemed to back off that stance, as he did not want to diminish his political power by appearing uninterested in advancement. Biden was officially nominated for vice president on August 27 by voice vote at the 2008 Democratic National Convention in Denver.

Biden's vice-presidential campaigning gained little media visibility, as far greater press attention was focused on the Republican running mate, Alaska Governor Sarah Palin. During one week in September 2008, for instance, the Pew Research Center's Project for Excellence in Journalism found that Biden was included in only five percent of coverage of the race, far less than the other three candidates on the tickets received. Biden nevertheless focused on campaigning in economically challenged areas of swing states and trying to win over blue-collar Democrats, especially those who had supported Hillary Clinton. Biden attacked McCain heavily despite a long-standing personal friendship. (Note: Biden admired McCain politically as well as personally. In May 2004, he had urged McCain to run as vice president with presumptive Democratic presidential nominee John Kerry, saying the cross-party ticket would help heal the "vicious rift" in U.S. politics.) He said, "That guy I used to know, he's gone. It literally saddens me." As the 2008 financial crisis reached a peak with the Bankruptcy of Lehman Brothers and the bailout of the banking industry became a major factor in the campaign, Biden voted in favor of the $700 billion Emergency Economic Stabilization Act of 2008, which went on to pass in the Senate 74–25.

On October 2, 2008, Biden participated in the vice-presidential debate with Palin at Washington University in St. Louis. Post-debate polls found that while Palin exceeded many voters' expectations, Biden had won the debate overall. During the campaign's final days, he focused on less populated, older, less well-off areas of battleground states, especially Florida, Ohio, and Pennsylvania, where polling indicated he was popular and where Obama had not campaigned or performed well in the Democratic primaries. He also campaigned in some normally Republican states, as well as in areas with large Catholic populations.

Under instructions from the campaign, Biden kept his speeches succinct and tried to avoid offhand remarks, such as one he made about Obama's being tested by a foreign power soon after taking office, which had attracted negative attention. Privately, Biden's remarks frustrated Obama. "How many times is Biden gonna say something stupid?" he asked. Obama campaign staffers referred to Biden blunders as "Joe bombs" and kept Biden uninformed about strategy discussions, which in turn irked Biden. Relations between the two campaigns became strained for a month, until Biden apologized on a call to Obama and the two built a stronger partnership. Publicly, Obama strategist David Axelrod said Biden's high popularity ratings had outweighed any unexpected comments. Nationally, Biden had a 60% favorability rating in a Pew Research Center poll, compared to Palin's 44%.

On November 4, 2008, Obama and Biden were elected with 53% of the popular vote and 365 electoral votes to McCain–Palin's 173.

At the same time Biden was running for vice president he was also running for reelection to the Senate, as permitted by Delaware law. On November 4, he was reelected to the Senate, defeating Republican Christine O'Donnell. Having won both races, Biden made a point of waiting to resign from the Senate until he was sworn in for his seventh term on January 6, 2009. He became the youngest senator ever to start a seventh full term, and said, "In all my life, the greatest honor bestowed upon me has been serving the people of Delaware as their United States senator." Biden cast his last Senate vote on January 15, supporting the release of the second $350 billion for the Troubled Asset Relief Program, and resigned from the Senate later that day. (Note: Delaware's Democratic governor, Ruth Ann Minner, announced on November 24, 2008, that she would appoint Biden's longtime senior adviser Ted Kaufman to succeed Biden in the Senate. Kaufman said he would serve only two years, until Delaware's special Senate election in 2010. Biden's son Beau ruled himself out of the 2008 selection process due to his impending tour in Iraq with the Delaware Army National Guard. He was a possible candidate for the 2010 special election, but in early 2010 said he would not run for the seat.) In an emotional farewell, Biden told the Senate: "Every good thing I have seen happen here, every bold step taken in the 36-plus years I have been here, came not from the application of pressure by interest groups, but through the maturation of personal relationships." Delaware Governor Ruth Ann Minner appointed longtime Biden adviser Ted Kaufman to fill Biden's vacated Senate seat.

== Major events ==
=== Middle Eastern and European tour ===
In July 2008 Obama traveled to Kuwait, Afghanistan, Iraq, Jordan, the West Bank, Israel, Germany, France, and Britain. During the course of this trip he met with assorted international leaders, including President Hamid Karzai of Afghanistan, Prime Minister Nouri al-Maliki of Iraq, King Abdullah II of Jordan, Palestinian President Mahmoud Abbas, Prime Minister of Israel Ehud Olmert, Chancellor Angela Merkel of Germany, President Nicolas Sarkozy of France, and Prime Minister Gordon Brown of the United Kingdom, as well as former British Prime Minister Tony Blair and Conservative opposition leader (and future Prime Minister) David Cameron.

On July 24, 2008, he gave a speech at the Victory Column in Berlin before a crowd of estimated 200,000 to 240,000 people.

=== Presidential debates ===
There were three presidential debates between Obama and McCain. No third-party candidates or Independent candidates were offered an invitation to join in any of the debates, as Obama and McCain were the only candidates on the ballot in all 50 states and the District of Columbia. The Commission on Presidential Debates proposed, and the candidates agreed, that two of three 90-minute debates would be in an informal, seated, talk show format, while the third would be in a town hall format that allowed both candidates to walk around.

- The first presidential debate was held on Friday, September 26, 2008, at the University of Mississippi, Oxford, Mississippi. This debate was held in a traditional debate format.
- The second presidential debate was held on Tuesday, October 7, 2008, at Belmont University, in Nashville, Tennessee. This debate was held in the town hall format.
- The third presidential debate was held on Wednesday, October 15, 2008, at Hofstra University, in Hempstead, New York. This debate was held in a seated, talk show format.

On June 4, John McCain proposed a series of ten joint town hall meetings with Obama, at which the two could engage each other. Obama first agreed in principle to the notion, but later rejected McCain's proposal, offering instead one town-hall event on the Independence Day holiday and four traditional debate-style joint appearances. Hank Paulson, President Bush's Treasury Secretary, said Obama's comprehension of the 2008 financial crisis compared to McCain's was as broad as "night and day". McCain's confidence vastly lowered when Obama questioned his ideas on the financial crisis in a meeting on September 25 at the White House with Bush and other congressmen. McCain did not have suggestions regarding what he would do to fix the economy, particularly Henry Paulson's $700 billion three-page bank recovery plan (TARP). Neither McCain nor Bush had read it. Obama's confidence escalated from that point. This was the turning point of the campaign. That stock market loss was subsequently exceeded by an even larger −7.0% plunge on September 29, 2008.

On September 24, 2008, after the onset of the 2008 financial crisis, McCain announced that he was suspending his campaign to return to Washington to help craft a $700 billion bailout package for the troubled financial industry, and he stated that he would not debate Obama until Congress passed the bailout bill. Despite this decision, McCain was portrayed as not playing a significant role in the negotiations for the first version of the bill, which fell short of passage in the House. He eventually decided to attend the first presidential debate on September 26, despite Congress' lack of immediate action on the bill. His ineffectiveness in the negotiations and his reversal in decision to attend the debates were seized upon to portray McCain as erratic in his response to the economy. Days later, a second version of the original bailout bill was passed by both the House and Senate, with Obama, his vice presidential running mate Joe Biden, and McCain all voting for the measure (Hillary Clinton would as well).

=== Saddleback Civil Forum ===
The Civil Forum on the Presidency was the venue of back-to-back interviews of U.S. presidential candidates John McCain and Barack Obama by pastor Rick Warren on August 16, 2008, at Saddleback Church in Lake Forest, California.

=== Victory speech ===
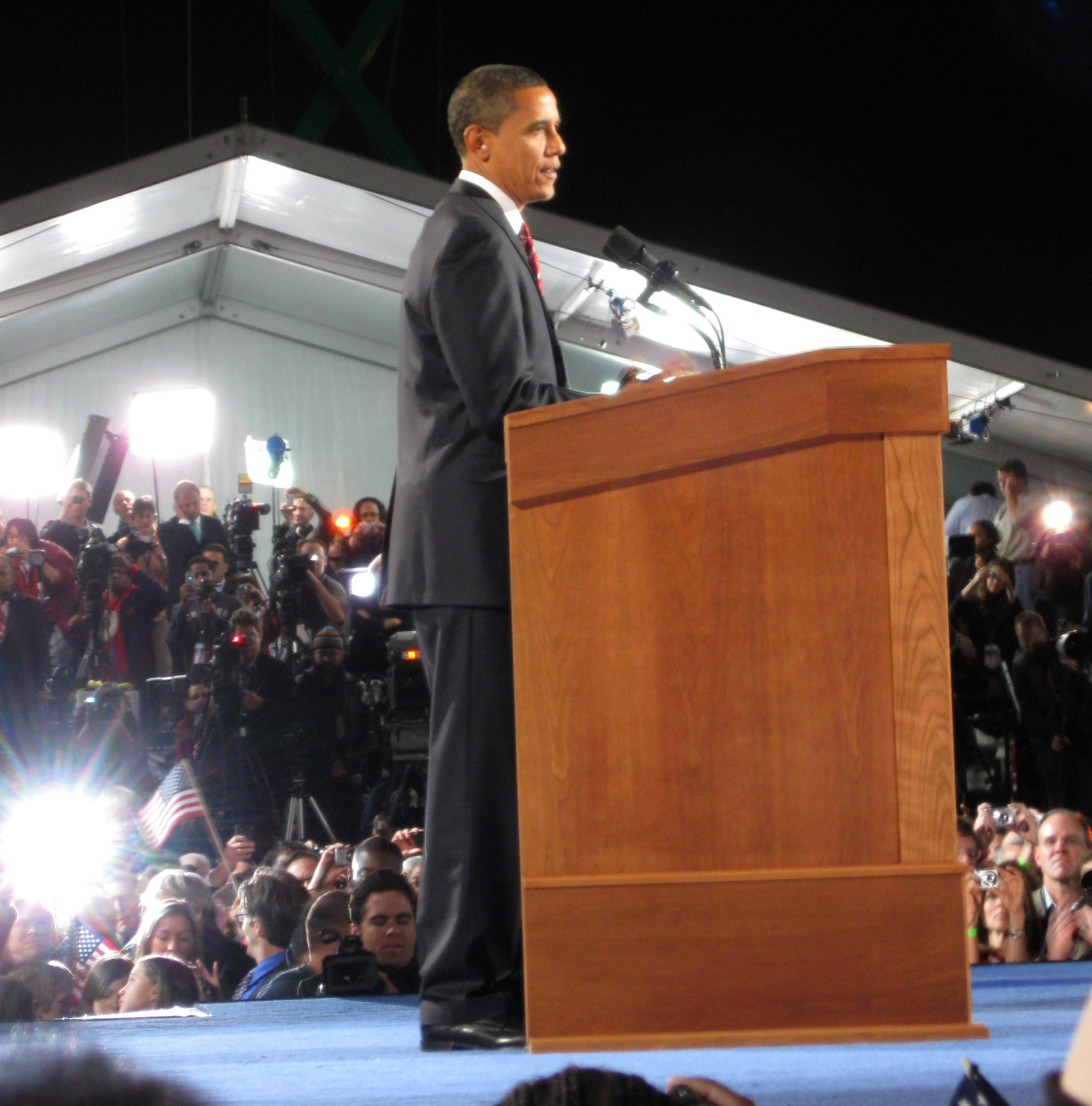
"If there is anyone out there who still doubts that America is a place where all things are possible, who still wonders if the dream of our founders is alive in our time, who still questions the power of our democracy, tonight is your answer." —Barack Obama, November 4, 2008

Following his victory, Obama gave his victory speech at Grant Park in his home city of Chicago on November 4, 2008, before an estimated crowd of 240,000. Viewed on television and the Internet by millions of people around the globe, Obama's speech focused on the major issues facing the United States and the world, all echoed through his campaign slogan of change. He also mentioned his grandmother, who had died two nights earlier.

== Fundraising ==
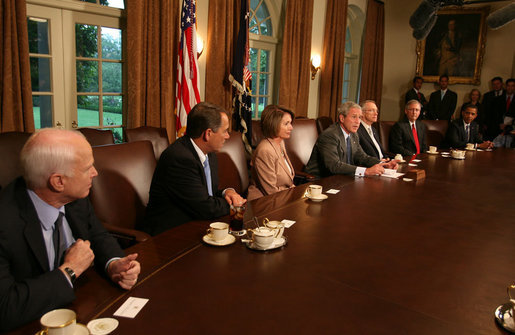
Obama (far right) participates in a bipartisan meeting with President Bush and Senator McCain, and House and Senate party leaders regarding the economy, September 25, 2008.

The Obama campaign's fundraising broke previous records for presidential primary and general campaigns, and has changed expectations for future presidential elections. The campaign avoided using public campaign funds, raising all of its money privately from individual donors. By the general election the campaign committee raised more than $650 million for itself, and coordinated with both the Democratic National Committee (DNC) and at least 18 state-level Democratic committees to create a joint-fundraising committee to raise and split tens of millions of dollars more.

Post-election fundraising continued for the separate transition administration, called the Obama-Biden Transition Project, and also the separate inaugural ceremonies and celebrations committee.

=== Chronology ===
According to reports filed with the Federal Election Commission, Obama's campaign raised more money in the first quarter of 2008 ($133,549,000) than it had raised in all of 2007 ($103,802,537). The campaign had a relatively small total of $21.9 million in May, but went on to raise $52 million in June, after Obama had secured the nomination.

On June 19, Obama was the first major-party presidential candidate to turn down public financing for a general election campaign since the system was created in the aftermath of Watergate. Obama was expected to raise $265 million between the time of the announcement and election day.

By rejecting the funds in favor of private donations, the campaign was in a position to outspend John McCain prior to the election. Had he signed on to the plan, the campaign would only have been able to spend $84.1 million between the party convention in August and the general election in November.

Obama explained his decision to opt out of the public financing system, saying, "public financing of presidential elections as it exists today is broken, and we face opponents who've become masters at gaming this broken system." Critics of the decision argued that the decision contradicted earlier statements that he would attempt to reach agreement with McCain to obtain public financing, and asserted that Obama's campaign was receiving as much support from unregulated 527 groups as McCain's.

On September 4, 2008, the Obama campaign announced they raised $10 million in the 24-hour period after Republican vice presidential nominee Sarah Palin's acceptance speech. The RNC reported raising $1 million in the same period.

On October 19, 2008, Obama's campaign announced a record fundraising total of $150 million for September 2008. This exceeded the campaign's single-month record ($66 million) for August 2008.

The campaign raised much of its cash in small donations over the internet, with about half of its intake coming in increments of less than $200. Both major party campaigns screened regularly for patterns of abuse and returned or rejected donations in excess of legal limits, from overseas, from untraceable addresses, or from fraudulent names. After some criticism of the Obama campaign on conservative blogs, the Republican National Committee asked the Federal Election Commission to investigate the Obama campaign's screening practices.

== Branding ==
=== Logo ===
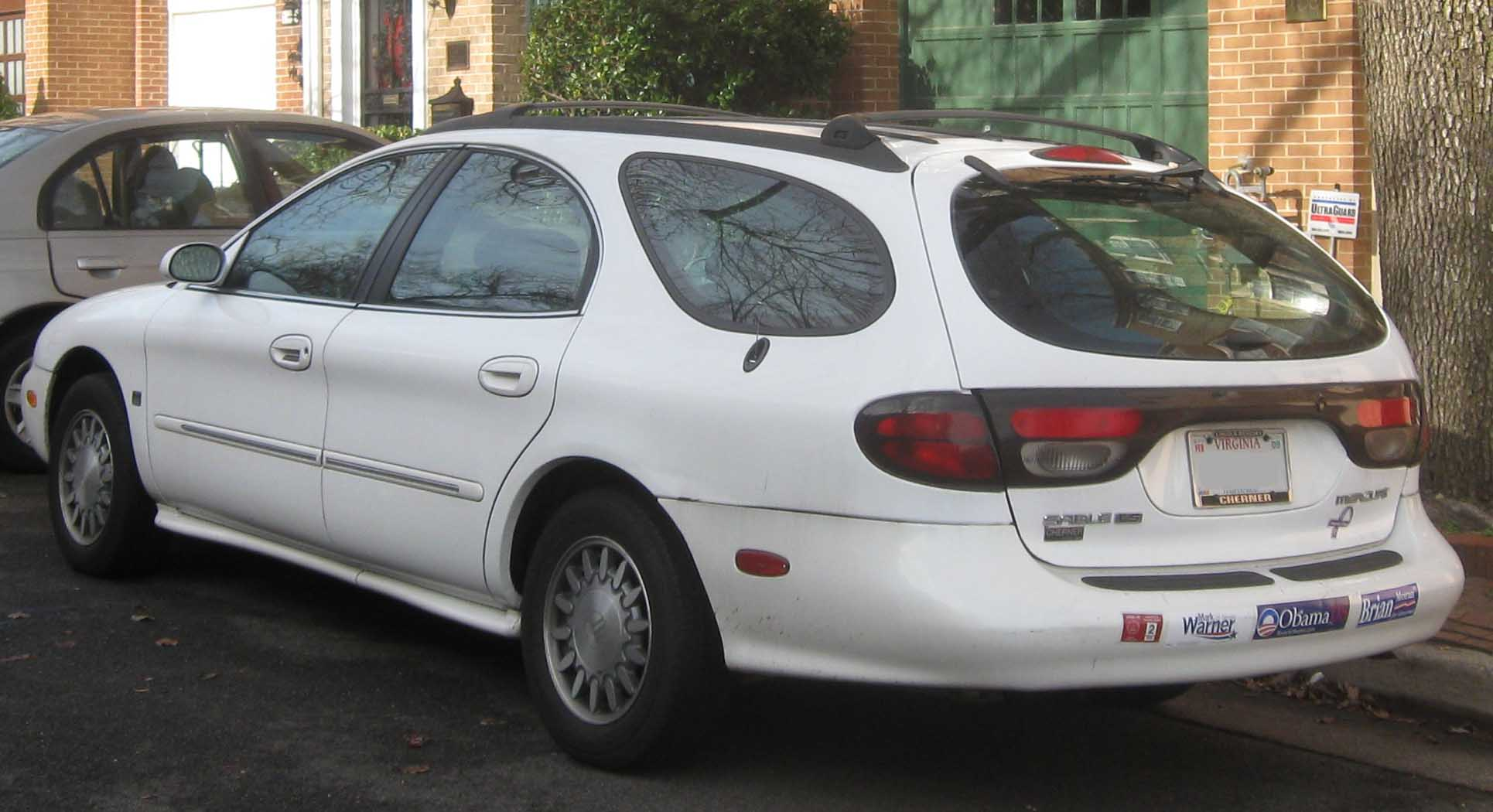
A 3rd Generation Mercury Sable station wagon with Barack Obama bumper sticker visible on rear bumper

Obama's campaign is notable for its extensive use of a logo. The logo, consisting of a circle, with the center suggesting a sun rising over fields in the colors of the American flag, was designed by a team at Chicago design firm Sender LLC. "We were looking at the "o" of his name and had the idea of a rising sun and a new day," according to Sol Sender, now a strategist at VSA Partners. "The sun rising over the horizon intended to evoked a new sense of hope."

=== Slogan ===
Obama's campaign used the slogan "Change we can believe in" and the chant "Yes We Can". The latter slogan is shared with the United Farm Workers and associated with its founder Dolores Huerta and is well known amongst Latinos in its Spanish form Sí se puede. The "Change we can believe in" has been used in parodies both during and since the campaign. John McCain attempted to criticize Obama by enumerating various controversial policy positions he allegedly took and proclaiming "that's not change we can believe in" alongside a banner proclaiming McCain as "a leader we can believe in". Since the campaign it has been used to parody campaigns against incumbents as being "change you can't believe in" such as by British blog LeftFootForward against David Cameron or by the Economist against the People's Democratic Party of Tajikistan.

=== Hope poster ===
The "hope" poster was an iconic image of Barack Obama designed by artist Shepard Fairey. It consisted of a stylized stencil portrait of Obama in solid red, white (actually beige) and (pastel and dark) blue. Either the words "progress", "hope", or "change" were under the image of Obama (in some versions other words were used). It was created and distributed widely—as a digital image, on posters and other paraphernalia—during the 2008 election season. Initially it was distributed independently but with the approval of the official Obama campaign. The image became one of the most widely recognized symbols of Obama's campaign message, spawning many variations and imitations, including some commissioned by the campaign itself. In January 2009, after Obama had won the election, Fairey's mixed-media stenciled portrait version of the image was acquired by the Smithsonian Institution for its National Portrait Gallery.

=== Typefaces ===
The signature campaign typeface was Gotham, typically using capital letters with occasional use of the script Snell Roundhand. Gotham was designed in 2000 by Jonathan Hoefler and Tobias Frere-Jones, originally for GQ magazine. Prior to Gotham, the campaign used the typeface Gill Sans in upper case and lower case. Another Hoefler and Frere-Jones font, Requiem, was used for the campaign logo.

=== Campaign songs ===
U2's "City of Blinding Lights" was often played in anticipation of Obama's speeches during campaign events. Bruce Springsteen's "The Rising" was also played heavily during his campaign rallies. Stevie Wonder's "Signed, Sealed, Delivered I'm Yours" was frequently played immediately after Obama's speeches. Barack Obama personally asked Joss Stone in August to write and record his presidential campaign song, reportedly due to the fact that she appeals across racial boundaries. Ben Harper's "Better Way" was also played at a few events throughout the campaign. Furthermore, Obama's candidacy inspired artists to create more unsolicited music and music videos than any other candidate in American political history. Examples include "Yes We Can" by will.i.am, of the band The Black Eyed Peas; "Make it to the Sun" by Ruwanga Samath and Maxwell D; "Barack Obama" by JFC; and "Unite the Nation" by the Greek-American hip hop group Misa/Misa.

== Technology ==
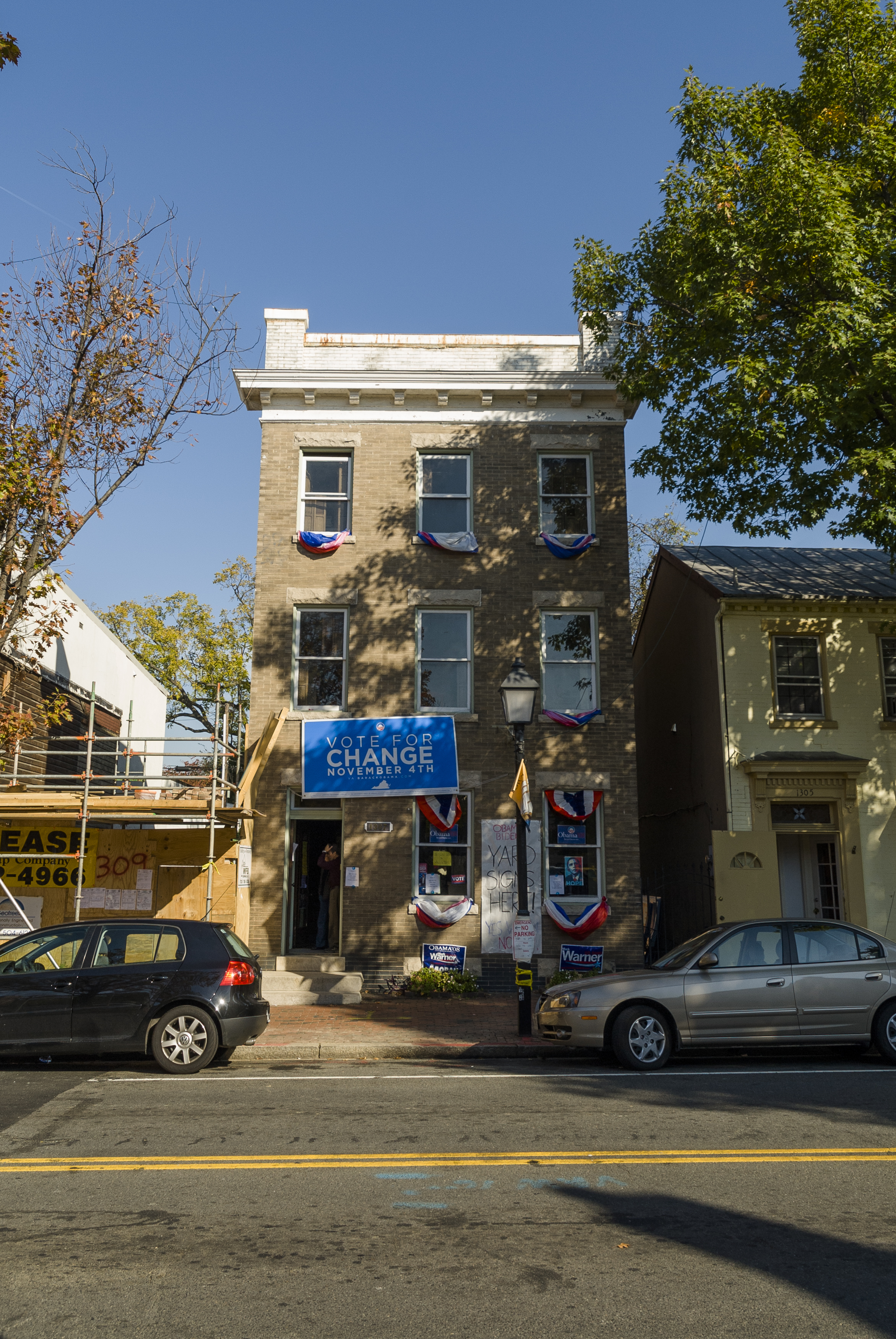
An "Obama 08" campaign office in Arlington, Virginia, photographed November 1, 2008

Obama was particularly noted for his use of the Internet to rally supporters and make his policies known. He is the first U.S. president to have effectively used the internet and social media for successful political outcomes.

"The integration of technology into the process of field organizing … is the success of the Obama campaign," says Sanford Dickert, who worked as John Kerry's chief technology officer for the 2004 campaign. "But the use of technology was not the end-all and be-all in this cycle. Technology has been a partner, an enabler for the Obama campaign, bringing the efficiencies of the internet into the real-world problems of organizing people in a distributed, trusted fashion."

Obama's campaign was further strengthened by his opponent John McCain's comparatively limited use of the Internet. McCain did not have the organization of Obama's campaign, nor did he spend a comparable amount of money on this portion of the campaign. Both opportune timing and usage of online campaigning gave Obama significant advantage over McCain.

=== Social media ===
Through forums and social websites such as MySpace, Facebook, and Twitter Obama built relationships with his supporters, and would-be supporters. He developed an upfront, personable and face-to-face quality that gave his supporters a sense of security and trust, which inspired them to rally others in their local communities. The supporters of Obama themselves formed a nationwide community.

All of his policies were made available online, and updates were sent to the subscribers of his political party via email and text message, ultimately making him the most technologically savvy candidate to date, increasing his popularity among young voters.

=== MyBo ===
In early 2007, the Obama campaign launched a social-networking site called my.barackobama.com, or MyBO for short, and recruited 24-year-old Facebook co-founder Chris Hughes to help develop the platform and their social networking strategy. MyBo became the hub of the campaign's online efforts to organize supporters.

The nationwide community provided useful and effective tools, such as the Neighbor-to-Neighbor tool, allowing supporters to reach a large number of people in a short time in their own community, which in turn led to campaign rallying for more Obama support. An unprecedented communication strategy was the "online call tool". Over one million calls were made from residential, personal laptops and desktops. Online communication led to Obama supporters engaging in social activities such as signmaking and door-to-door petitioning for Obama support, as well as simply discussing their opinions about policies and issues they supported along with Obama. As described by campaign adviser Steve Spinner, the campaign grew "from zero to 700 employees in a year and raised $200 million. That's a super-high-growth, fast-charging operation."

=== NationalField ===
In 2008, campaign staffers stationed in the state of Georgia, reinvented the process of reporting and aggregating nightly data and intelligence upward through the campaign apparatus—making the organizing work of vast Obama field infrastructure more immediately measurable. NationalField became an internal social network within the field organization, used to monitor the daily activities of the sprawling grassroots effort. It allowed staff to share what they were working on and benchmark themselves against other staffers. Unlike a standard social graph, where all users have access to all information, NationalField was based on a hierarchical social graph where the higher level you were in the organization, the broader your view of the information below you.

The platform closely reflected the team-building model of the Obama Campaign, often associated with organizer and Harvard professor Marshall Ganz in that it was an intensely structured a social network.

=== Voter Data ===
After trailing Republicans for many election cycles in their use of micro-targeting, the 2008 Obama campaign was the first Democratic presidential campaign to benefit from the existence of a national voter file. In 2007, DNC chairman Howard Dean centralized data collection and management by hiring the Voter Activation Network and creating the database Votebuilder. Votebuilder created a web-based interface for the database and permitted the Obama campaign to give neighborhood-level volunteers access to the registered voter list for their area of responsibility.

== Media campaign ==
In October 2008, Obama was voted Advertising Age magazine's "Marketer of the Year" by members of the Association of National Advertisers for the campaign, surpassing Apple and Zappos.com. In a post-election analysis of the campaign, the magazine lauded its "understanding of ground-level marketing strategies and tactics, everything from audience segmentation and database management to the creation and maintenance of online communities."

=== Online advertising ===
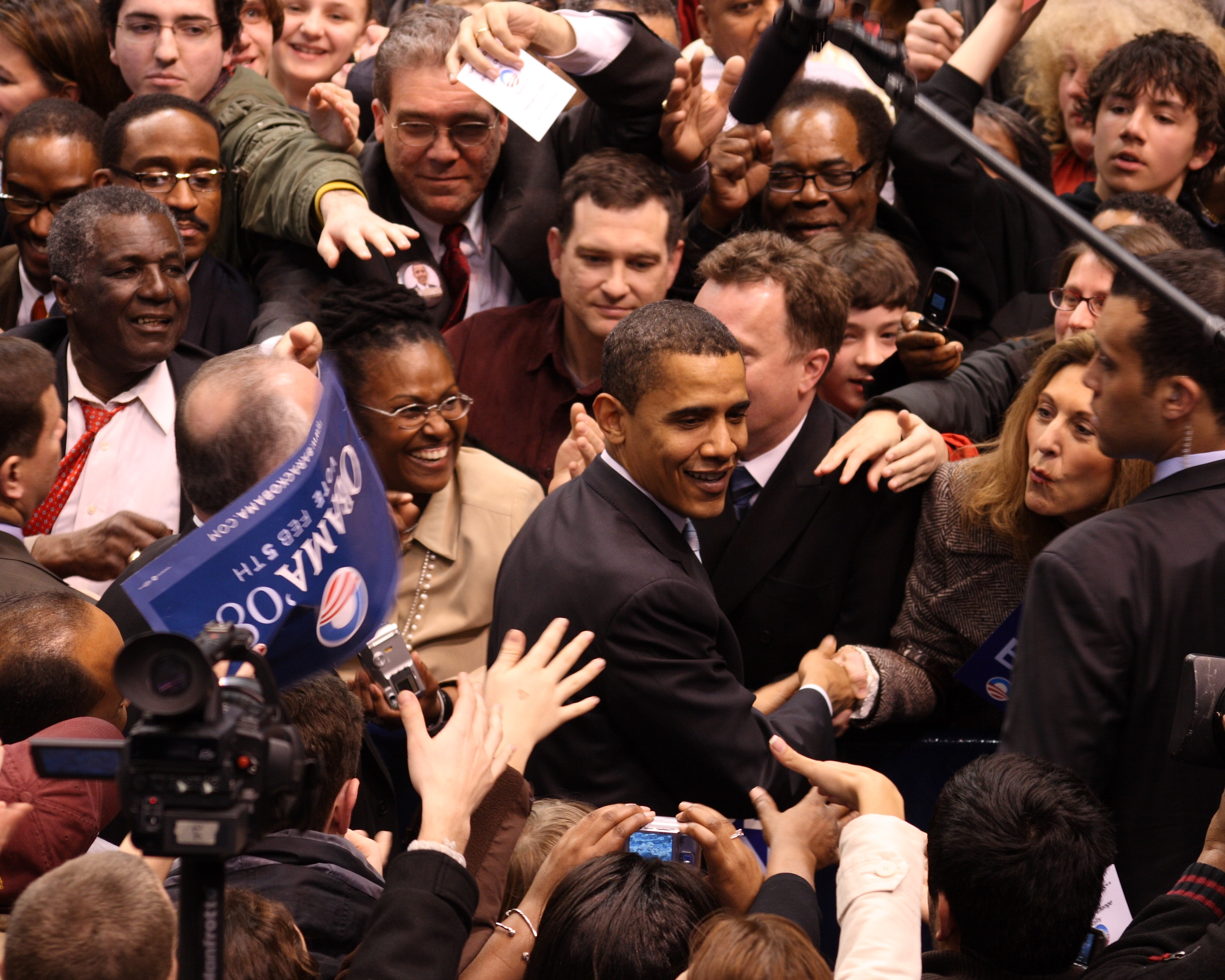
Obama shaking hands with supporters in 2008

The Obama web campaign used consumer marketing to target individuals with customized information to their predicted interests. Political communication to viewers was based on data collected about them. This data was collected by volunteers, surveys on the website and records of consumption habits. Website surveys took a short amount of time to fill out and the company used A/B testing to determine which forms converted most effectively, led by the team's Director of Analytics Dan Siroker. More detailed surveys were requested and received through email. Records of consumption habits helped the campaign make predictions about people based on statistical models. People received messages tailored close to their beliefs. Marketing based on consumer data also enabled effective grassroots organizing through the website. Data gathered from the website indicated who the most dedicated constituents were; the website tracked how often a person visited and when.

=== Television advertisements ===
Soon after becoming the presumptive nominee, Obama began a biographical commercial campaign emphasizing his patriotism. The advertisements ran in 18 states, including traditionally Republican Alaska and North Carolina. Between June 6 and July 26, Obama's campaign spent $27 million on advertisements, against McCain and Republican National Committee's combined total of $24.6 million.

In a September 15, 2008 interview with Good Morning America, Obama stated, "If we're going to ask questions about, you know, who has been promulgating negative ads that are completely unrelated to the issues at hand, I think I win that contest pretty handily." What he apparently meant was that McCain had put out more negative ads.

=== Infomercial ===
On October 29 at 8:00 pm EDT, the Obama campaign's 30-minute infomercial "American Stories, American Solutions" was simulcast on NBC, CBS, Fox, Univision, MSNBC, BET and TV One, focusing on a wide range of issues including health care and taxation. The infomercial then showed an Obama speech live from Florida. Fox asked for the second part of Game Five of the 2008 World Series to be delayed by 15 minutes in order to show the commercial, and that request was granted. ABC was the only major US network not to show the ad after being indecisive during the initial approach and the Obama campaign later declined the offer. The Obama ad got 30.1 million viewers across networks compared to ABC's Pushing Daisies which garnered 6.3 million viewers. Prior to this, the last presidential candidate to purchase a half-hour ad was H. Ross Perot, who ran as an independent candidate in 1992. The Obama campaign also bought a channel on Dish Network to screen Obama ads 24/7. Wyatt Andrews reported on a "Reality Check" on the CBS Evening News the next day with doubts over the factual accuracy of some of the promises Obama made in the advertisement, given the government's enormous financial deficit.

=== Other Initiatives ===
==== Fight the Smears ====
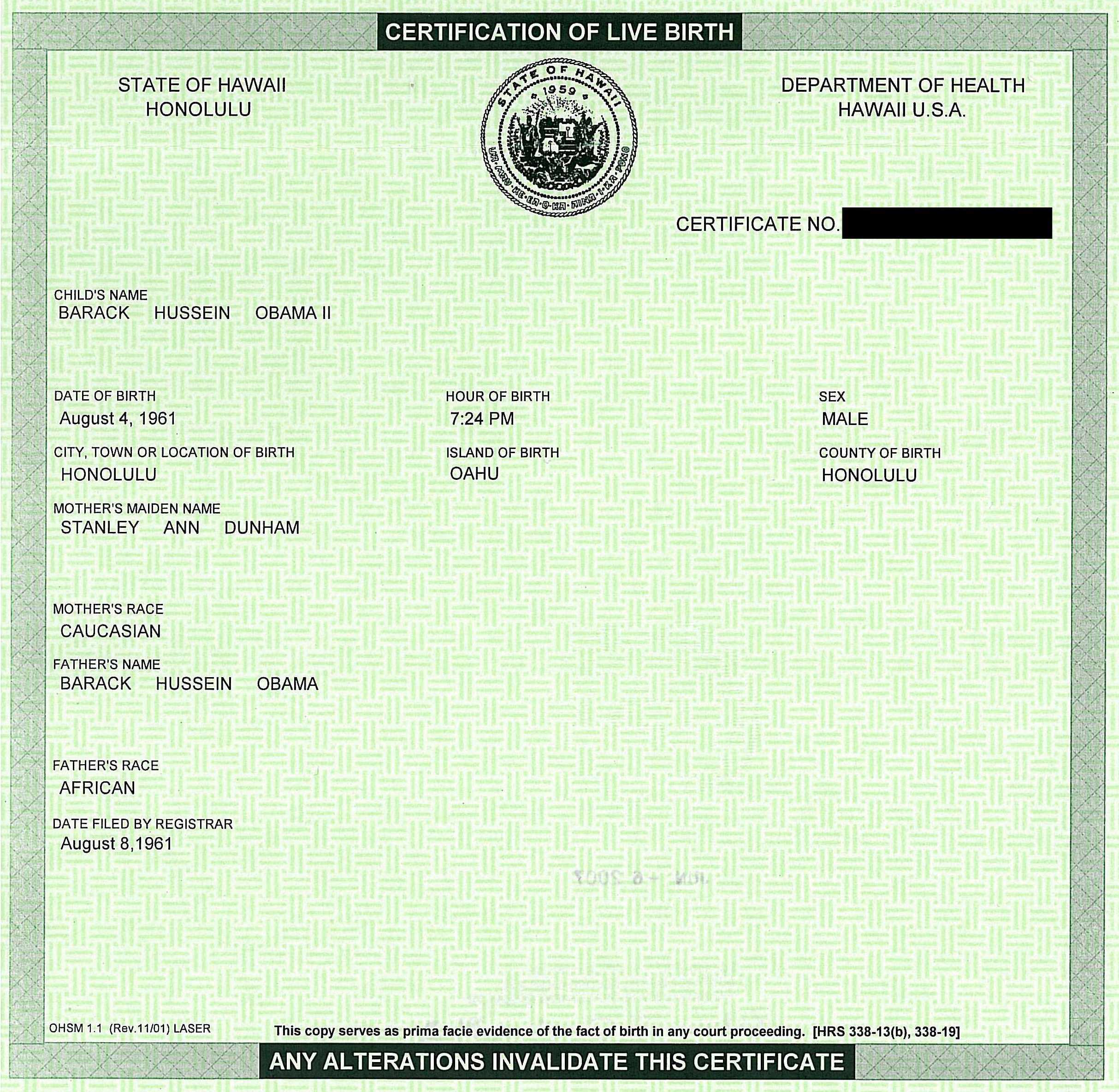
Obama's birth certificate

On June 12, 2008, the Obama campaign launched a website to counter what the campaign described as smears by his opponents. The site provided responses to issues brought up about the candidate, such as:

- Claims that he is not a natural-born citizen of the United States.
- Portrayals of his relationship with Bill Ayers.
- Claims that he is a Muslim and not a Christian.

==== Israel for Obama ====
Originally started by American-Israelis in late May, the "Israel for Obama" campaign aimed to refute the allegations made against Obama concerning Israel and the Jewish community. This was done by gaining endorsements from Israel. When he took a Middle East trip from Afghanistan to Iraq, Jordan and finally to Israel, they organized a small "Israel for Obama" rally for him.

Ira Forman, executive director of the National Jewish Democratic Council stated that "The Democratic operation in the Jewish community was more extensive than I've seen in 35 years," The chairman of the campaign in Israel, Yeshiyah Amariel, and others such as the Jewish Alliance for Change and the Jewish Council for Education & Research used YouTube to release video endorsements from officials and normal people in Israel for Obama and his positions (such as "Israelis for Obama" and "right man for the job.") In the closing weeks of the election the campaign used support from Israelis to fight the smears spread online by bloggers. Its success caused the polls of Jewish support for Obama to increase so that by the time of the Nov. 4 election, according to exit polls, 77% of the voting American Jewish community voted for Obama over the 23% that were for John McCain.

== Political positions ==
Obama has taken positions on many national, political, economic and social issues, either through public comments or his senatorial voting record. Since announcing his presidential campaign in February 2007, Obama emphasized withdrawing American troops from Iraq, increasing energy independence (that includes New Energy For America plan), decreasing the influence of lobbyists, and promoting universal health care as top national priorities.

== Opinion polling ==
Statewide opinion polling for the 2008 United States presidential election up to November 3, 2008: >10% Obama lead 4%–10% Obama lead 1%–4% Obama lead Tie 1%–4% McCain lead 4%–10% McCain lead >10% McCain lead

The day after Obama's acceptance speech at the Democratic National Convention, Obama's Republican opponent, Arizona Senator John McCain, announced his selection of Alaska Governor Sarah Palin as his running mate. Almost immediately, the Obama/Biden ticket plunged in the polls: in a Gallup poll of likely voters, the McCain/Palin ticket gained a 10-point lead. The erosion of support for the Obama/Biden ticket was especially pronounced among white women who had previously shown strong support for Hillary Clinton. However, Obama regained and maintained the national poll average after September 19.

A RealClearPolitics average of 14 national polls taken between October 29 and November 2 showed an average 7.3% lead for Obama over McCain. Obama's highest support in the polling average was 8.2% on October 14. Among individual polls tracked by RealClearPolitics, Obama's highest support was recorded in a Newsweek poll conducted between June 18 and June 19 and a Pew Research poll conducted between October 23 and October 26 showing a 15% lead.

Gallup conducted weekly polls of registered voters to measure support among the candidates. The final poll conducted between October 27 and November 2 showed 24% of pure Independents supporting Obama, trailing the 32% who favored McCain. Obama's Independent support peaked at 33% the week of October 6–12.

A RealClearPolitics average of four national polls measuring favorable/unfavorable opinions taken between October 28 and November 2 showed an average 55.5% favorable rating and 39.8% unfavorable rating. Obama's highest ratings in the polling average were 61.2% favorable and 32.5% unfavorable on July 8.

As of November 3, 2008, one day before the election, the RealClearPolitics electoral map excluding toss up states showed 278 electoral votes for Obama/Biden, an electoral majority, and 132 electoral votes for opponents McCain/Palin. Including toss up states, the Obama/Biden ticket led with 338 votes.

== Election day ==
Electoral college results of the 2008 presidential election; Obama won a majority of 365 votes

On November 4, 2008, Barack Obama became the first African American to be elected President of the United States, sparking many celebrations in the United States and around the world. He gained almost 53% of the popular vote and 365 electoral votes. The popular vote percentage was the best showing for any presidential candidate since George H. W. Bush in 1988. His 365 electoral votes was the best showing since Bill Clinton had 379 in 1996. He won Colorado, Florida, Indiana, Iowa, Nevada, New Mexico, North Carolina, Ohio, and Virginia, all states that were won by President George W. Bush in 2004. In addition, he became the first Democratic presidential candidate to win one of Nebraska's electoral votes since the state decided to split their electoral votes. He was the first presidential candidate to be elected president without winning Missouri since 1956. Though his record would be broken by both major party candidates 12 years later, Obama received more total votes than any presidential candidate in history up to that point, totaling well over 69 million votes. It would later be broken by Joe Biden in 2020.

63% of Americans who met the voting requirements voted, the highest percentage in fifty years. Obama won the moderate vote 60–39 and the independent vote 52–44.

Joe Biden also made history by becoming the first Roman Catholic to be elected vice president. In addition, he is the longest-serving senator to become vice president, having served in the United States Senate for the 36 years prior to the election. Biden also won reelection to the Senate, but served only briefly in the 111th Congress before resigning to take his place as vice president.

== Certification of the electoral votes ==
On January 8, 2009, the joint session of the U.S. Congress, chaired by Vice President Cheney as President of the Senate and Nancy Pelosi as Speaker of the House, announced and certified the votes of the Electoral College for the 2008 presidential election. From the electoral votes of the 50 states and the District of Columbia, Vice President Cheney declared 365 electoral votes for both Barack Obama of the state of Illinois and Joseph Biden of the state of Delaware and 173 electoral votes for both John McCain of the state of Arizona and Sarah Palin of the state of Alaska. Based on the results of the electoral vote count, Vice President Cheney declared officially that Obama was elected as President of the United States and Biden was elected as Vice President of the United States.

Over 25% of the electorate was of a race besides Caucasian, a first for America.

== See also ==
- 2008 Democratic Party presidential candidates
- 2008 Democratic Party presidential primaries
- List of Barack Obama 2008 presidential campaign endorsements
- Campaign rhetoric of Barack Obama
- First inauguration of Barack Obama
- Iowa Electronic Market
- Presidential transition of Barack Obama
- 2008 Democratic Party vice presidential candidate selection
- 2008 Democratic National Convention
- Barack Obama assassination plot in Denver and Tennessee
- John McCain 2008 presidential campaign
- Barack Obama 2008 presidential election victory speech
- Barack Obama 2012 presidential campaign
- List of African-American United States presidential and vice presidential candidates
