= Marcyliena Morgan =

American academic (1950–2025)

Marcyliena Hazel Morgan (May 8, 1950 – September 28, 2025) was an American linguistic anthropologist known for legitimizing the study of hiphop as an academic subject. She was the Ernest E. Monrad Professor of the Social Sciences, Professor in the Department of African and African American Studies at Harvard University, and the Executive Director of Harvard's Hiphop Archive, which she founded in 2002. It was the world's first hiphop archive.

== Early life and education ==
Morgan was born in Chicago, Illinois, on May 8, 1950. She was born to Henry Morgan, a telephone worker union organizer and Juliette Murray Morgan, a data center manager, and was the third of six daughters. She graduated from Englewood High School in 1968. She earned a B.A. in communications anthropology at the University of Illinois Chicago in 1972, an M.A. at the University of Illinois in 1973, an M.A. at the University of Essex, England in 1978, and a PhD in anthropological linguistics at the University of Pennsylvania in 1989.

== Career ==
A linguistic anthropologist whose work legitimized hip-hop as a topic of academic study, Morgan was the emerita Ernest E. Monrad Professor of the Social Sciences and Professor in the Department of African and African American Studies at Harvard University. She taught at Harvard for over twenty years, taking emerita status in 2024. She was the author of Language, Discourse and Power in African American Culture (Cambridge University Press, 2002) and The Real Hiphop - Battling for Knowledge, Power, and Respect in the LA Underground (Duke University Press, 2008).

In 2002, Morgan founded the Hiphop Archive at the W.E.B. Du Bois Institute for Afro-American Research at Harvard, and served as its Executive Director. A project Morgan first pitched to Henry Louis Gates Jr. in 1996, it became the world's first hiphop archive, and the creation of similar institutions followed at Cornell University, University of Massachusetts Boston, Georgia State University, and the College of William & Mary.

== Personal life and death ==
Morgan was married to fellow Harvard professor Lawrence Bobo. They lived in the Brattle District of Cambridge, Massachusetts, in a home originally designed by Lois Howe in 1898. Bobo and Morgan remodeled the home, contracting with architect Mary Ann Thompson and consulting on the kitchen design with chefs Jody Adams and Aaron Sanchez. The remodeled Victorian has received recognition and awards.

Morgan died in Boston on September 28, 2025, at the age of 75, from complications of Alzheimer's disease.

== Legacy ==
A scholarship at San Francisco State University is named for Morgan. In September 2025, Harvard’s Hiphop Archive was renamed to the Marcyliena H. Morgan Hip Hop Archive & Research Institute in her honor.

== Bibliography ==
- Language, Discourse and Power in African American Culture (Cambridge University Press, 2002)
- The Real Hiphop - Battling for Knowledge, Power, and Respect in the LA Underground (Duke University Press, 2008)
- Morgan, M. and Bennett, D. "Hip-Hop & the Global Imprint of a Black Cultural Form." Daedalus 140, no. 2 (2011): 176-196.
