= Gertrude Noone =

American supercentenarian and oldest American military veteran

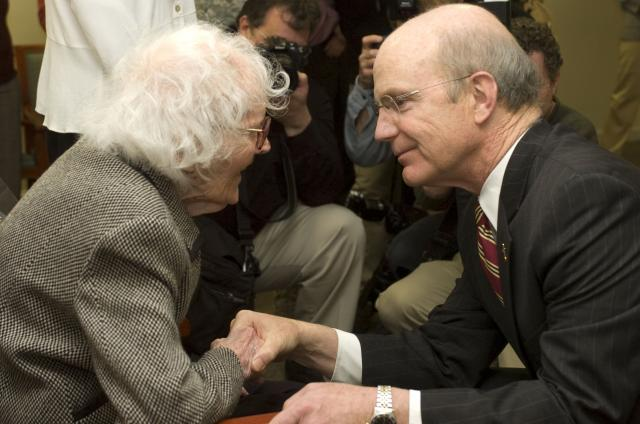
- Gertrude Noone at 110, greeted by Army Secretary Pete Geren
- Born: December 30, 1898; Ansonia, Connecticut, U.S.
- Died: September 10, 2009 (aged 110 years, 254 days); Milford, Connecticut, U.S.
- Burial place: Mount St. Peter's Cemetery, Derby, Connecticut, U.S.
- Military career
- Allegiance: United States
- Branch: United States Army (Women's Army Corps)
- Service years: 1943–1949
- Rank: Sergeant First Class
- Conflicts: World War II
- Other work: administrative assistant

Gertrude Evelyn Noone (December 30, 1898 – September 10, 2009) was an American supercentenarian and also the oldest American military veteran until she died in September 2009. At death, she was the oldest military veteran in the world, having served in World War II as a clerk in Fort Myer, an army base in Virginia.

== Biography ==
Gertrude Noone was born in Ansonia, Connecticut on December 30, 1898. She was the ninth of her family's ten children.

Noone, who never married, worked as an insurance policy clerk for The Travelers. She left her job to enlist in 1943 in the Women's Army Corps during World War II when she was 44 years old. While enlisted in the Corps, Noone became the chief clerk of the dispensary at Fort Myer, near Washington D.C. She rose within the Corps to the rank of sergeant first class by the time she left the United States Army in 1949.

She returned to the private sector, where she worked as an administrative assistant at a psychiatric hospital in Stamford, Connecticut, until her retirement in 1962.

The honorary title of oldest known living military veteran passed to Gertrude Noone on July 25, 2009, following the death of British World War I veteran Harry Patch.

Gertrude Noone died at the Carriage Green assisted living facility in Milford, Connecticut, on September 10, 2009, aged 110. She was buried with full military honors at Mount St. Peter's Cemetery in Derby, Connecticut.

== See also ==
- Longevity
- Supercentenarian
