= Michael Dawson (political scientist) =

American political scientist

Michael C. Dawson
- Education: University of California, Berkeley; Harvard University
- Awards: Hanes Walton Jr. Award; APSA; Fellow, AAAS
- Scientific career
- Fields: Political science; African-American studies
- Workplaces: University of Michigan; Harvard University; University of Chicago

Michael C. Dawson is an American political scientist, currently the John D. MacArthur professor of political science at the University of Chicago. He is also the founding director of the Center for the Study of Race, Politics and Culture there. He studies the political behavior, public opinion, and political ideology of African Americans, using both quantitative methods and political theory.

== Career ==
Dawson completed a BA at the University of California, Berkeley in 1982, and then received a PhD from Harvard University in 1986. Before working at the University of Chicago, Dawson also worked at The University of Michigan and Harvard University.

Dawson has written four books. His first book, Behind the Mule: Race and Class in African-American Politics, was published in 1994. In a review of the book, Hanes Walton Jr. called it a "pioneering and pathbreaking work". The book advances the argument that, because "race was the decisive factor in determining the opportunities and life chances available to virtually all African Americans" for much of American history up through the twentieth century, therefore it has historically been more efficient for African Americans to evaluate political alternatives based on what was best for the group that they were a member of rather than deciding what is the best for them individually. Walton reviewed this thesis as "unbelievably profound".

Dawson's most recent book is Blacks In and Out of the Left, published in 2013. The book is a history of African-American involvement in leftist radical movements in the twentieth century, which centers Black nationalism as a motivating force in American leftist politics. Dawson argues that Black nationalism has been omitted from dominant historical narratives about the recent history of the American left, and advocates for its inclusion in future leftist coalitions, citing certain coalitions of black and white radicals that existed before the Civil Rights Movement as a potential model.

Dawson has served in prominent academic service positions. He is the founder and co-editor of the Du Bois Review: Social Science Research on Race, a peer-reviewed academic journal published by the Cambridge University Press that features research on race and politics. He has also been the chair of the political science department at the University of Chicago.

Dawson has received several significant awards and honors. In 2006, Dawson was named a fellow of the American Academy of Arts and Sciences. In 2017, he received the Hanes Walton Award from the American Political Science Association, which is given to "a political scientist whose lifetime of distinguished scholarship has made significant contributions to our understanding of racial and ethnic politics and illuminates the conditions under which diversity and intergroup tolerance thrive in democratic societies".

Dawson has written extensively for media outlets like the Boston Review and The New York Times, and his work has been cited in works like The Washington Post and the Berkeley Daily Planet.

== Selected works ==
- Behind the Mule: Race and Class in African-American Politics (1994)
- Black Visions: The Roots of Contemporary African-American Political Ideologies (2001)
- Not In Our Lifetimes: The Future of Black Politics (2011)
- Blacks In and Out of the Left (2013)

== Selected awards ==
- Fellow, American Academy of Arts and Sciences (2006)
- Hanes Walton Jr. Award, American Political Science Association (2017)
