= Barack Obama 2008 presidential election victory speech =

Presidential election victory speech

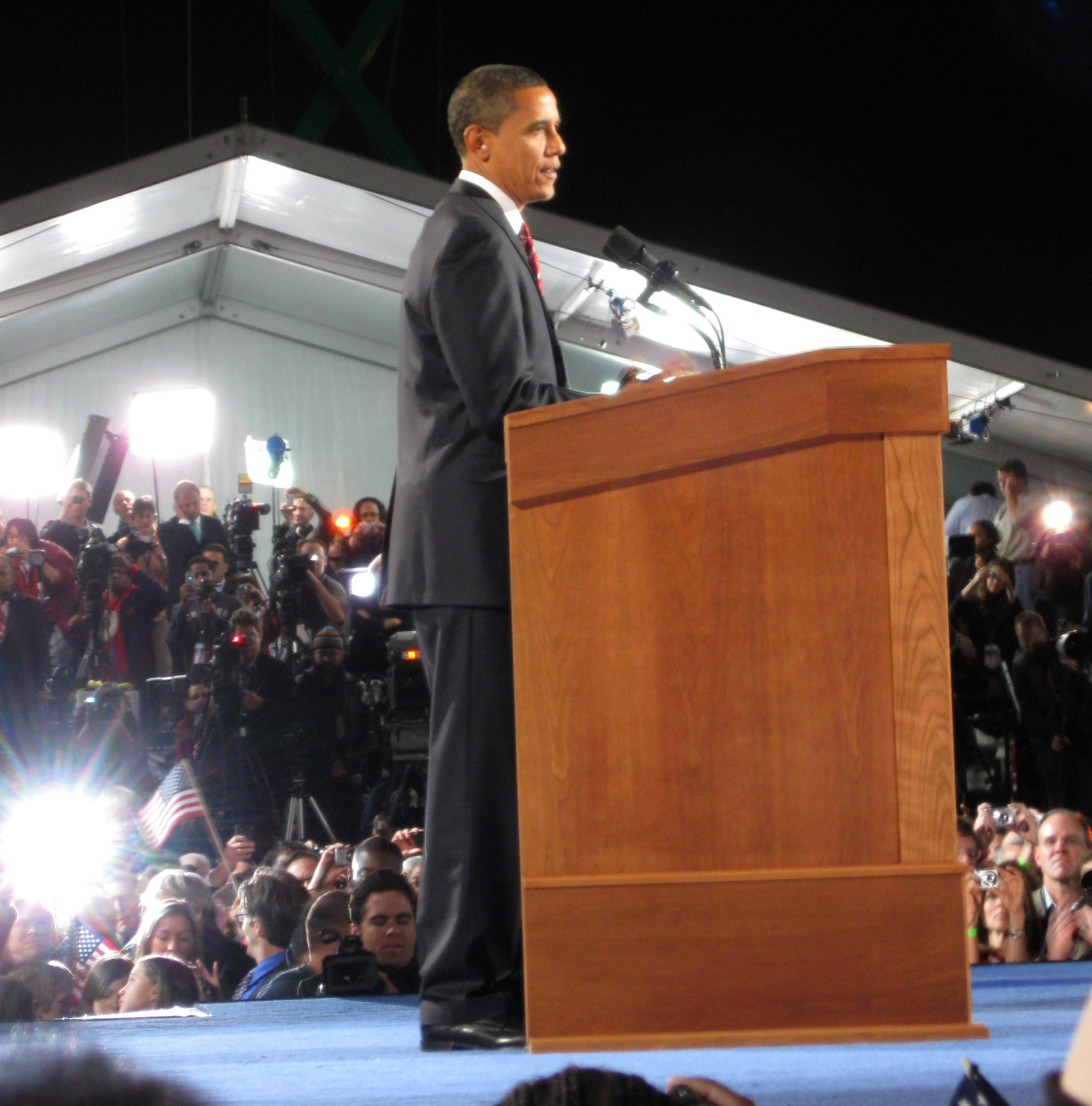
"If there is anyone out there who still doubts that America is a place where all things are possible, who still wonders if the dream of our founders is alive in our time, who still questions the power of our democracy, tonight is your answer." —Barack Obama, November 4, 2008

Following his victory in the 2008 United States presidential election, then-President-elect Barack Obama, who was 47 years old at the time, gave his victory speech at Grant Park in his home city of Chicago, on November 4, 2008, before an estimated crowd of 240,000. Viewed on television and the Internet by millions of people around the globe, Obama's speech focused on the major issues facing the United States and the world, all echoed through his campaign slogan of change. He also mentioned his maternal grandmother Madelyn Dunham, who had died just two nights earlier.

== References in the speech ==
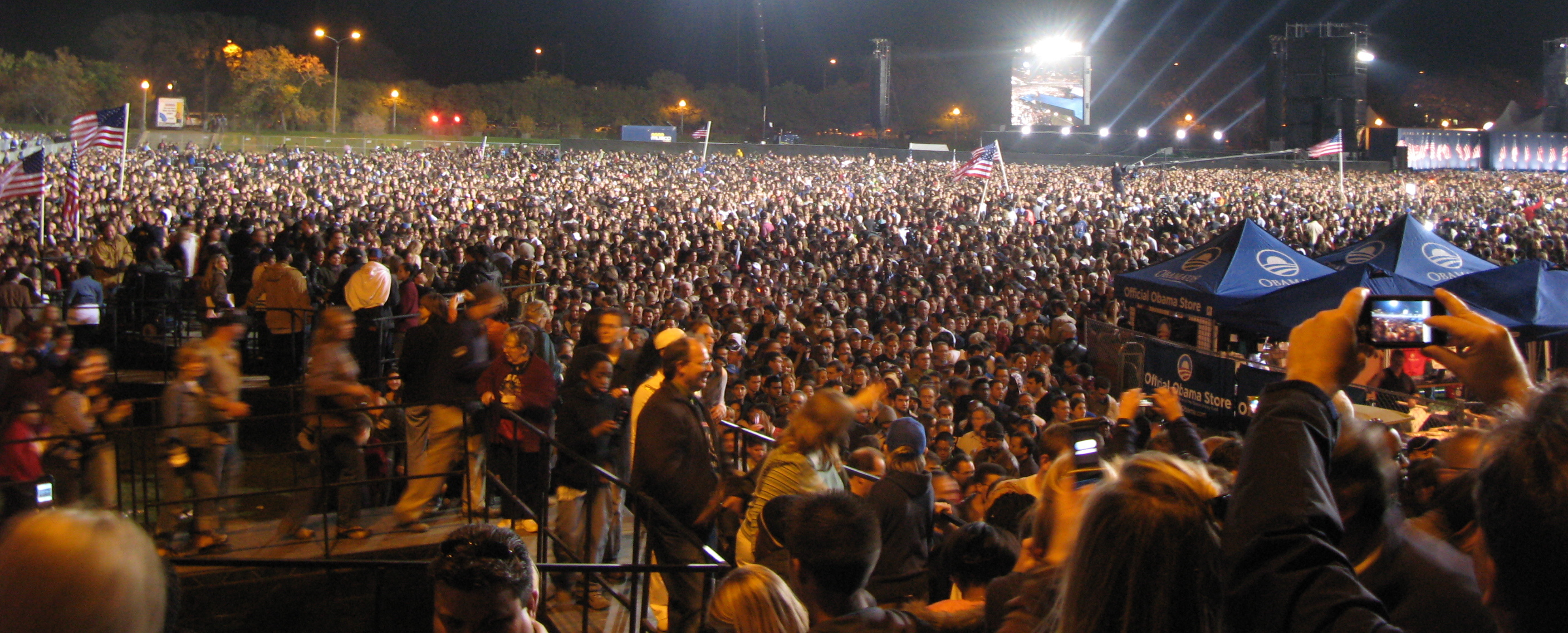
Crowd at Grant Park during Obama's speech

The speech heavily referenced the inaugural addresses of former presidents John F. Kennedy and Abraham Lincoln, and also referred to speeches of Martin Luther King Jr.

Echoing Martin Luther King's "I've Been to the Mountaintop" address, he declared, "But tonight, because of what we did on this day, in this election, at this defining moment, change has come to America" and "The road ahead will be long, our climb will be steep. We may not get there in one year, or even in one term—but America, I have never been more hopeful than I am tonight that we will get there." At another point in the speech he again referenced King when referring to the "arc of history", a phrase King used regularly, most notably after the Selma to Montgomery marches, saying "the arc of the moral universe is long, but it bends toward justice".

Obama directly quoted Abraham Lincoln's first inaugural address, by saying "As Lincoln said to a nation far more divided than ours, we are not enemies but friends. Though passion may have strained, it must not break our bonds of affection."

Obama also referred to Abraham Lincoln's Gettysburg Address by saying "... that more than two centuries later a government of the people, by the people, and for the people has not perished from the Earth".

Obama proclaimed, "It's been a long time coming, but ... change has come to America", an allusion to the Sam Cooke song "A Change Is Gonna Come".

Obama also made a reference to a prospective presidential pet for his daughters.

Sasha and Malia ... I love you both more than you can imagine. And you have earned the new puppy that's coming with us ... to the White House.

== Issues ==
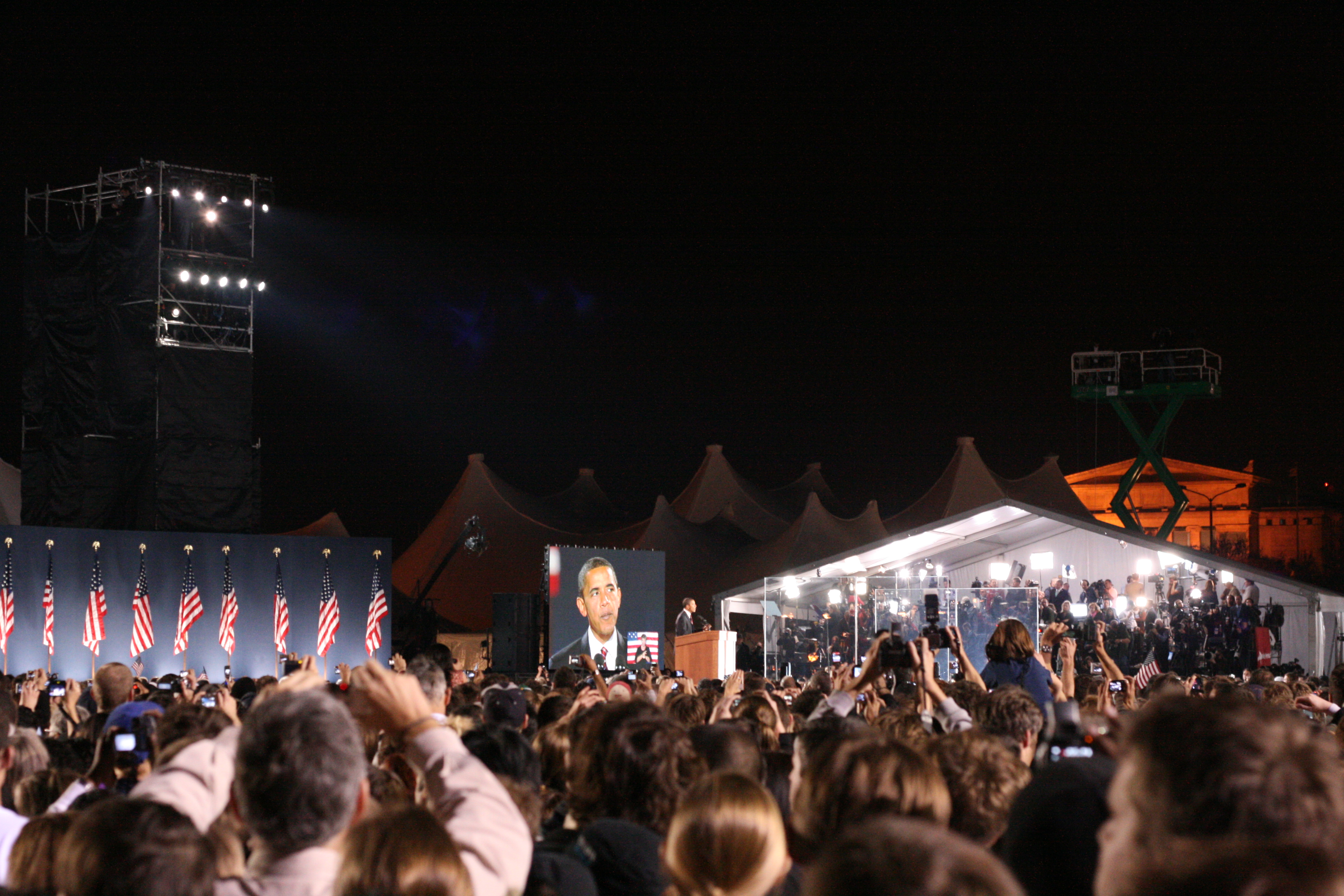
Supporters at Grant Park watch Obama delivering his speech

Obama spoke of the core issues facing the United States at the time, among them the 2008 financial crisis, and the Iraq War.

Even as we stand here tonight, we know there are brave Americans waking up in the deserts of Iraq and the mountains of Afghanistan to risk their lives for us. There are mothers and fathers who will lie awake after the children fall asleep and wonder how they'll make the mortgage or pay their doctors' bills or save enough for their child's college education.

On the 2008 financial crisis:

Let us remember that, if this financial crisis taught us anything, it's that we cannot have a thriving Wall Street while Main Street suffers.

A message to America's enemies and friends:

To those — to those who would tear the world down: We will defeat you. To those who seek peace and security: We support you. And to all those who have wondered if America's beacon still burns as bright: Tonight we proved once more that the true strength of our nation comes not from the might of our arms or the scale of our wealth, but from the enduring power of our ideals: democracy, liberty, opportunity and unyielding hope.

Forward-thinking challenges:

There's new energy to harness, new jobs to be created, new schools to build, and threats to meet, alliances to repair.

To our future as Americans:

This is our time, to put our people back to work and open doors of opportunity for our kids; to restore prosperity and promote the cause of peace; to reclaim the American dream and reaffirm that fundamental truth, that, out of many, we are one; that while we breathe, we hope. And where we are met with cynicism and doubts and those who tell us that we can't, we will respond with that timeless creed that sums up the spirit of a people: Yes, we can.

== Significance ==
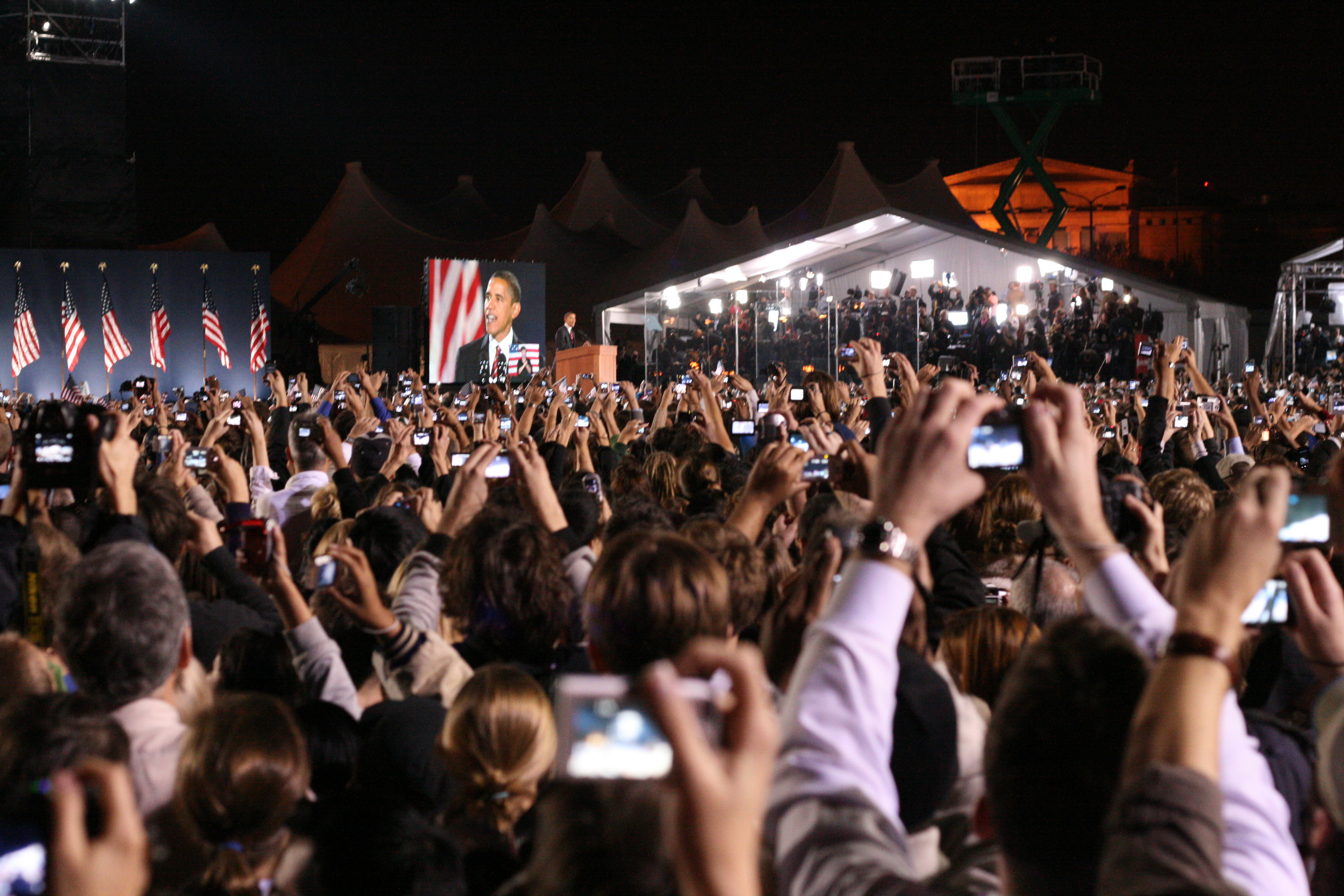
Supporters cheering as Obama delivers his speech in Grant Park

In his speech, Obama reflected on the hard times of the campaign and the "challenges that America would face ahead." TV coverage of the speech showed Jesse Jackson and Oprah Winfrey weeping in the crowd. Obama's speech also marked the first time a President-elect referred positively to gay Americans in an acceptance speech. Sam Perry experienced a brief moment of fame when Oprah Winfrey leaned on him while crying on his shoulder.

Grant Park was the location of many protests of the 1968 Democratic National Convention, which were significant for ending in violence, riots and police brutality. CNN declared, "History gave Grant Park another chance Tuesday as the scene of a peaceful and jubilant celebration of Barack Obama's presidential victory." Obama's speech has been praised as having "... the rare ability to cultivate the things that are common to all human beings, regardless of artificial and arbitrary distinctions."

== Ann Nixon Cooper ==
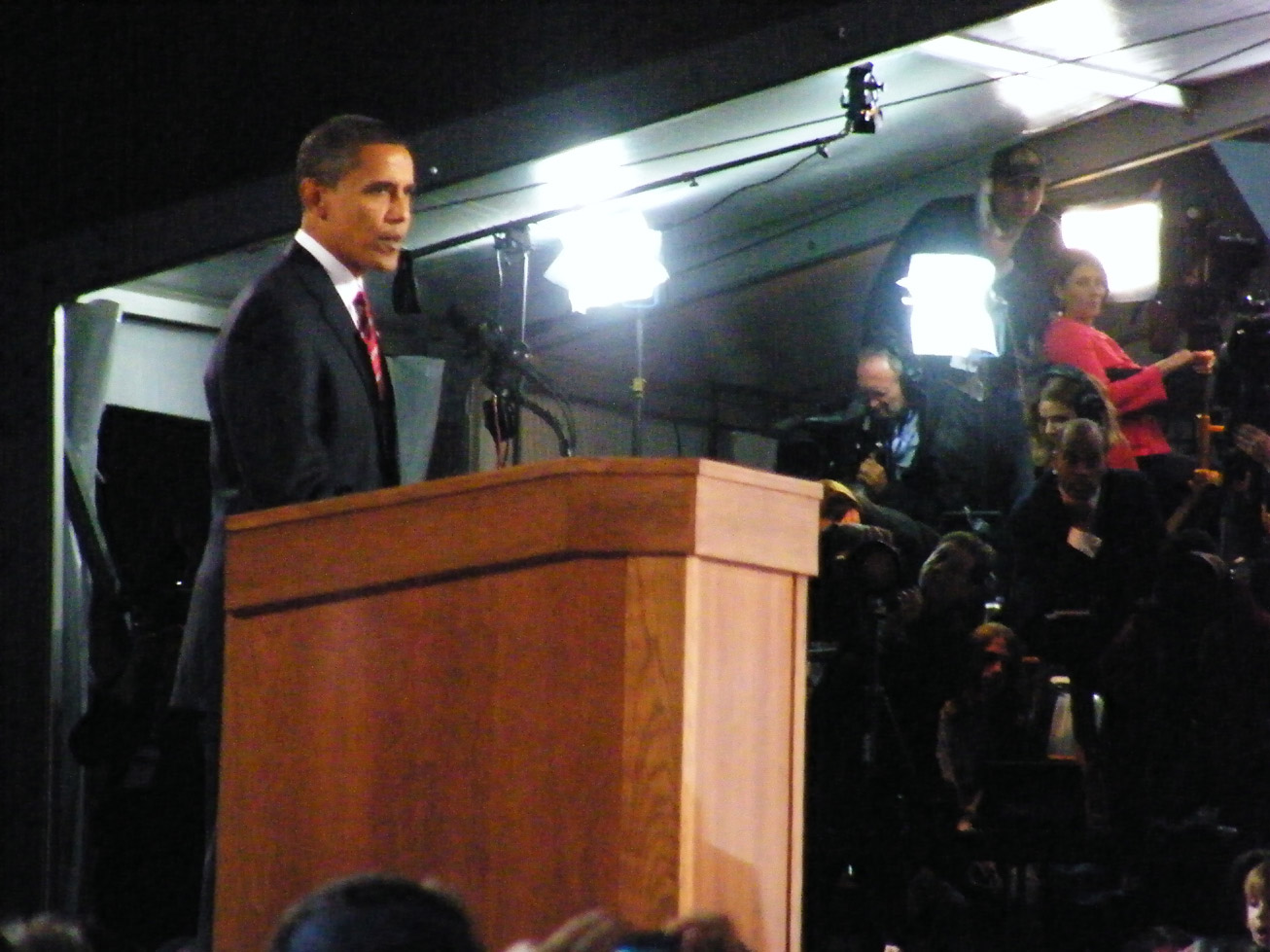
Obama delivers his speech

One of the primary references within Obama's speech was to Ann Nixon Cooper, a 106-year-old resident of Atlanta, Georgia.

She was born just a generation past slavery; a time when there were no cars on the road or planes in the sky, when someone like her couldn't vote for two reasons — because she was a woman and because of the color of her skin.

Obama also made reference to his popular campaign chant, "Yes We Can":

And tonight, I think about all that she's seen throughout her century in America — the heartache and the hope; the struggle and the progress; the times we were told that we can't; and the people who pressed on with that American creed: 'Yes, we can.'

== Security ==
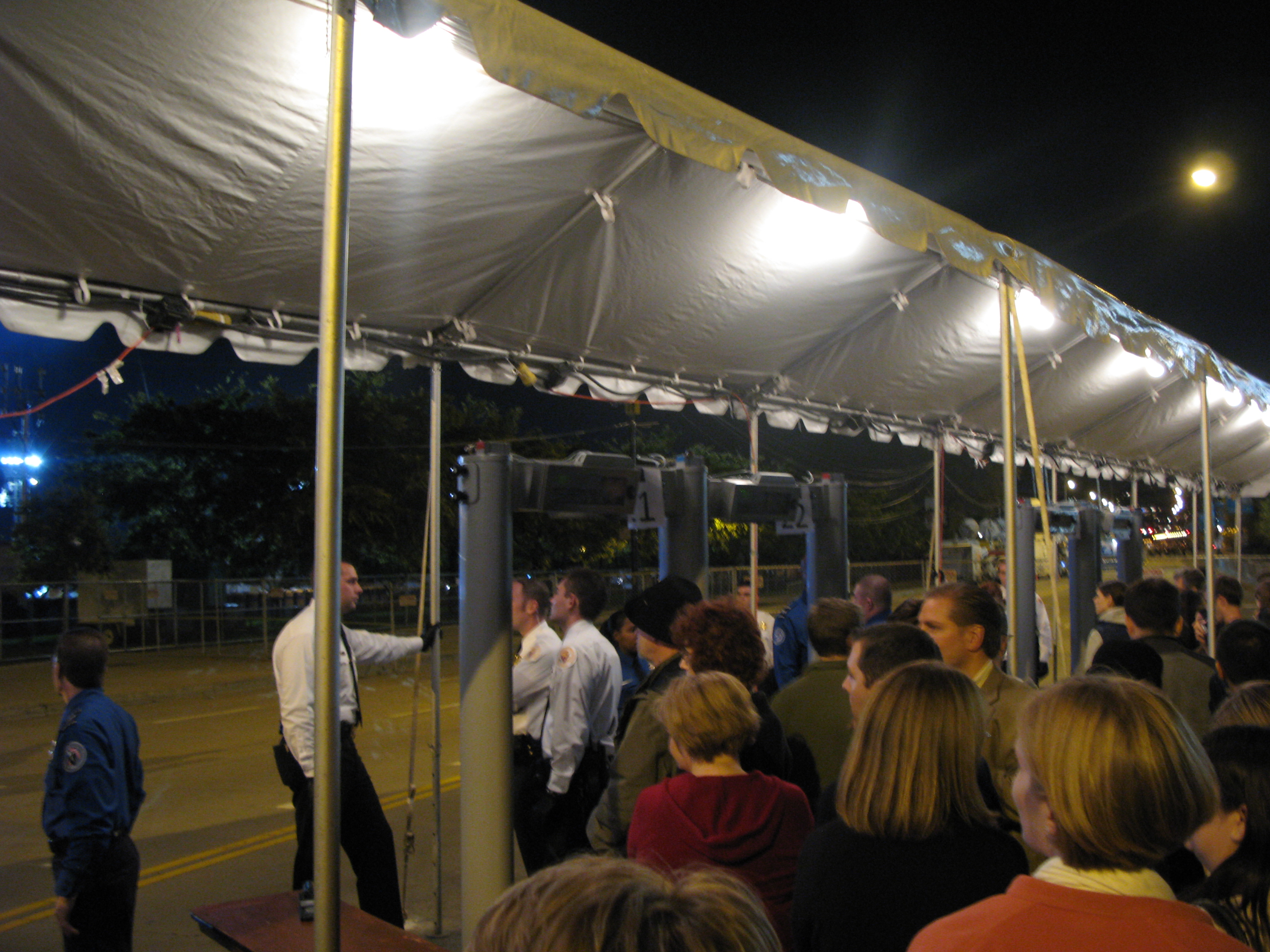
Security checkpoint along Columbus Drive

Due to the general high security threat involved, Obama delivered the speech protected by two pieces of bulletproof glass (2 inches (5.1 cm) thick, 10 feet (3.0 m) high, 15 feet (4.6 m) long) to each side of the lectern to deflect any shots from the skyscrapers overlooking Grant Park. A no-fly zone was also imposed over the area, with only police helicopters allowed in the air. The gathering involved the deployment of thousands of police, Army and Secret Service personnel. The event cost the Obama campaign an estimated $2 million. Even with the large threat at hand, no arrests were made related to the event.

== Music ==
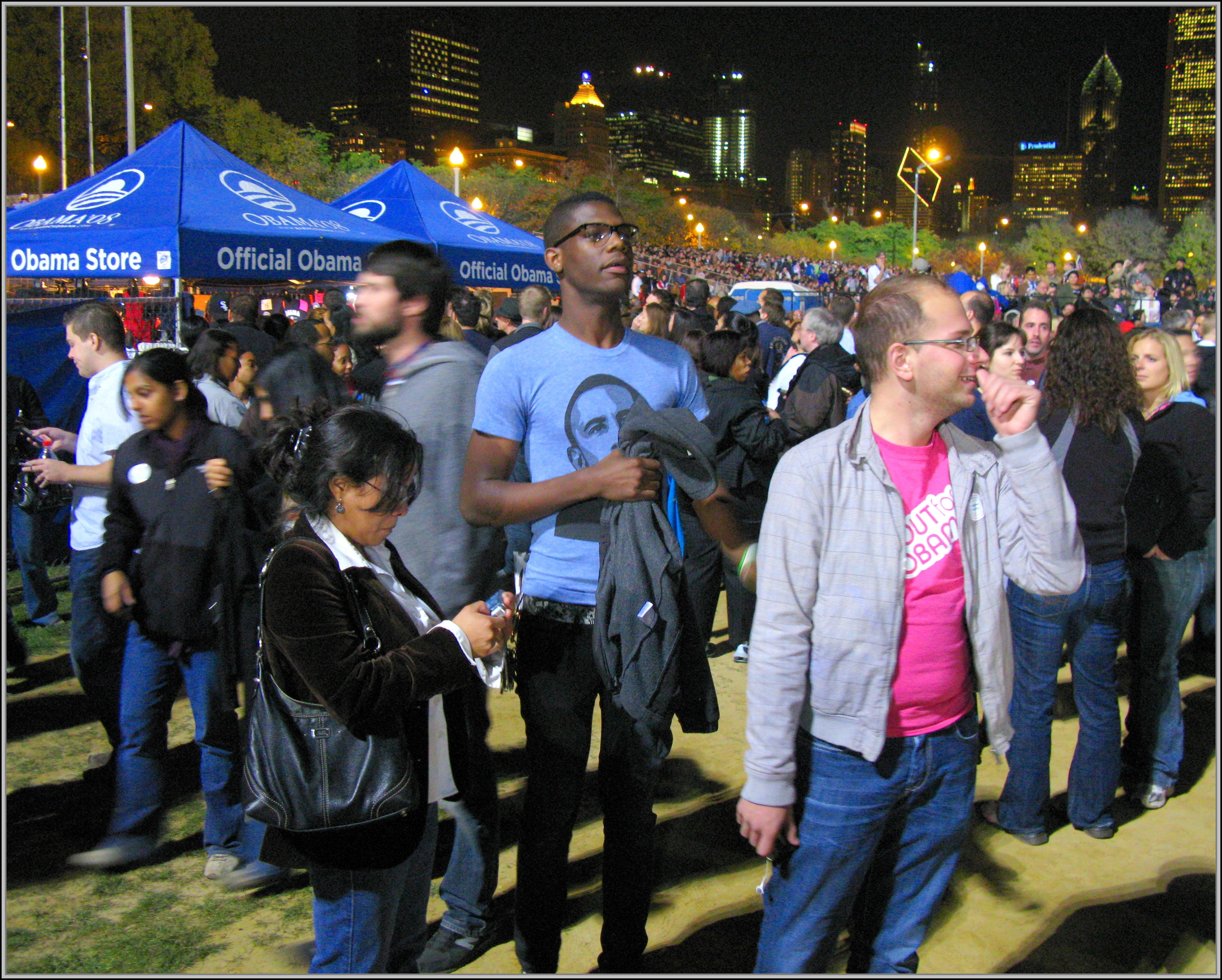
Supporters at Grant Park

Prior to Obama's emergence onto the stage, "Signed, Sealed, Delivered I'm Yours" by Stevie Wonder, "Only in America" by Brooks & Dunn, and "(Your Love Keeps Lifting Me) Higher and Higher" by Jackie Wilson were played. When Obama, Joe Biden, and their families appeared on stage following the speech, music from the films Remember the Titans, composed by Trevor Rabin, and The Patriot, composed by John Williams, was played. "The Rising" by Bruce Springsteen was also played following the speech (Springsteen had endorsed Obama).

== See also ==
- Barack Obama presidential campaign, 2008
