= Jewish Council for Education & Research =

The Jewish Council for Education & Research (JCER) was a federal "Super PAC" (independent expenditure-only political action committee). Founded in 2008, JCER's aim was "to develop and disseminate information to voters in the United States around issues of concern to the Jewish community". In particular, it campaigned in support of Barack Obama as President of the United States in the 2008 and 2012 US elections.

In 2008, it created a humorous video entitled "The Great Schlep", featuring comedian Sarah Silverman, calling on young people to encourage their grandparents in Florida to vote for Barack Obama as President of the United States in the coming election. The video went viral.

They endorsed Barack Obama for the 2012 election and believed that "his administration has made significant progress towards fulfilling the pledges he made during his campaign."
