= Identity politics =

Politics based on one's identity

Identity politics is politics based on a particular identity, such as ethnicity, race, nationality, religion, denomination, gender, sexual orientation, social background, political affiliation, caste, age, education, disability, opinion, intelligence, and social class. The term encompasses various often-populist political phenomena and rhetoric, such as governmental migration policies that regulate mobility and opportunity based on identities, left-wing agendas involving intersectional politics or class reductionism, and right-wing nationalist agendas of exclusion of national or ethnic "others".

The term identity politics dates to the late twentieth century, although it had precursors in the writings of individuals such as Mary Wollstonecraft and Frantz Fanon. Many contemporary advocates of identity politics take an intersectional perspective, which they argue accounts for a range of interacting systems of oppression that may affect a person's life and originate from their various identities. To these advocates, identity politics helps center the experiences of those they view as facing systemic oppression so that society can better understand the interplay of different forms of demographic-based oppression and ensure that no one group is disproportionately affected by political actions. Contemporary identity labels—such as people of specific race, ethnicity, sex, gender identity, sexual orientation, age—are not mutually exclusive but are, in many cases, compounded into one when describing hyper-specific groups. An example is that of African-American homosexual women, who can constitute a particular hyper-specific identity class.

Criticism of identity politics often comes from either the center-right or the far-left on the political spectrum. Many socialists, anarchists and Marxists have criticized identity politics for its divisive nature, claiming that it forms identities that can undermine their goals of proletariat unity and class struggle. On the other hand, many conservative think tanks and media outlets have criticized identity politics for other reasons, such as that it is inherently collectivist and prejudicial. Center-right critics of identity politics have seen it as particularist, in contrast to the universalism espoused by many liberal politics, or argue that it detracts attention from non-identity based structures of oppression and exploitation.

== Terminology ==
The Oxford English Dictionary traces the phrase "identity politics" to 1973.

Mark Mazower writes of the late 20th century: "In general, political activism increasingly revolved ... around issues of 'identity.' At some point in the 1970s this term was borrowed from social psychology and applied with abandon to societies, nations and groups."

During the late 1970s, increasing numbers of women—namely Jewish women, women of color, and lesbians—criticized the assumption of a common "woman's experience" irrespective of unique differences in race, ethnicity, class, sexuality, and culture. The term identity politics was (re-)coined by the Combahee River Collective in 1977. The collective group of women saw identity politics as an analysis that introduced opportunity for Black women to be actively involved in politics, while simultaneously acting as a tool to authenticate Black women's personal experiences. In the ensuing decades, the term has been employed in myriad cases with different connotations dependent on context. It subsequently gained currency with the emergence of social activism, manifesting in various dialogues within the feminist, American civil-rights, and LGBT movements, as well as within multiple nationalist and postcolonial organizations.

In academic usage, the term identity politics refers to a wide range of political activities and theoretical analyses rooted in experiences of injustice shared by different, often excluded social groups. In this context, identity politics aims to reclaim greater self-determination and political freedom for marginalized peoples through understanding particular paradigms and lifestyle factors, and challenging externally-imposed characterizations and limitations, instead of organizing solely around status quo belief-systems or traditional party-affiliations. Identity is used "as a tool to frame political claims, promote political ideologies, or stimulate and orient social and political action, usually in a larger context of inequality or injustice and with the aim of asserting group distinctiveness and belonging and gaining power and recognition."

== History ==
The term identity politics may have been used in political discourse since at least the 1970s. The first known written appearance of the term is found in the April 1977 statement of the Black feminist socialist group, Combahee River Collective, which was originally printed in 1979's Capitalist Patriarchy and the Case for Socialist Feminism, later in Home Girls: A Black Feminist Anthology, edited by Barbara Smith, a founding member of the Collective, who have been credited with coining the term. In their terminal statement, they said:

[A]s children we realized that we were different from boys and that we were treated different—for example, when we were told in the same breath to be quiet both for the sake of being 'ladylike' and to make us less objectionable in the eyes of white people. In the process of consciousness-raising, actually life-sharing, we began to recognize the commonality of our experiences and, from the sharing and growing consciousness, to build a politics that will change our lives and inevitably end our oppression....We realize that the only people who care enough about us to work consistently for our liberation are us. Our politics evolve from a healthy love for ourselves, our sisters and our community which allows us to continue our struggle and work. This focusing upon our own oppression is embodied in the concept of identity politics. We believe that the most profound and potentially most radical politics come directly out of our own identity, as opposed to working to end somebody else's oppression.

— Combahee River Collective, "The Combahee River Collective Statement"

Identity politics, as a mode of categorizing, are closely connected to the ascription that some social groups are oppressed (such as women, ethnic minorities, and sexual minorities); that is, the idea that individuals belonging to those groups are, by virtue of their identity, more vulnerable to forms of oppression such as cultural imperialism, violence, exploitation of labour, marginalization, or subjugation. Therefore, these lines of social difference can be seen as ways to gain empowerment or avenues through which to work towards a more equal society. In the United States, identity politics is usually ascribed to these oppressed minority groups who are fighting discrimination. In Canada and Spain, identity politics has been used to describe separatist movements; in Africa, Asia, and eastern Europe, it has described violent nationalist and ethnic conflicts. Overall, in Europe, identity politics are exclusionary and based on the idea that the silent majority needs to be protected from globalization and immigration.

During the 1980s, the politics of identity became very prominent and it was also linked to a new wave of social movement activism. Social movements have a significant influence on the law through statutory and constitutional evolution according to William Eskridge.

== By race or ethnicity ==
=== In the United States ===
Racial identity politics dominated American politics in the 19th century, during the Second Party System (1830s–1850s) as well as the Third Party System (1850s–1890s). Racial identity has been the central theme in Southern politics since slavery was abolished.

Similar patterns which have appeared in the 21st century are commonly referenced in popular culture, and are increasingly analyzed in media and social commentary as an interconnected part of politics and society. Both a majority and minority group phenomenon, racial identity politics can develop as a reaction to the historical legacy of race-based oppression of a people as well as a general group identity issue, as "racial identity politics utilizes racial consciousness or the group's collective memory and experiences as the essential framework for interpreting the actions and interests of all other social groups." This dynamic escalated as a significant segment of white Americans began to perceive social programs and wealth redistribution not as universal public goods, but as zero-sum transfers to Black Americans at their own expense. By reframing economic policy as a racialized grievance rather than a shared class interest, this perception undermined the potential for broad-based labor movements and redirected political energy toward identity-based conflict.

Carol M. Swain has argued that non-white ethnic pride and an "emphasis on racial identity politics" is fomenting the rise of white nationalism. Anthropologist Michael Messner has suggested that the Million Man March was an example of racial identity politics in the United States.

=== Arab identity politics ===
Arab identity politics concerns the form of identity-based politics which is derived from the racial or ethnocultural consciousness of the Arabs. In the regionalism of the Arab world and the Middle East, it has a particular meaning in relation to the national and cultural identities of the citizens of non-Arab countries, such as Turkey and Iran. In their 2010 Being Arab: Arabism and the Politics of Recognition, academics Christopher Wise and Paul James challenged the view that, in the post-Afghanistan and Iraq invasion era, Arab identity-driven politics were ending. Refuting the view that had "drawn many analysts to conclude that the era of Arab identity politics has passed", Wise and James examined its development as a viable alternative to Islamic fundamentalism in the Arab world.

According to Marc Lynch, the post-Arab Spring era has seen increasing Arab identity politics, which is "marked by state-state rivalries as well as state-society conflicts". Lynch believes this is creating a new Arab Cold War, no longer characterized by Sunni-Shia sectarian divides but by a reemergent Arab identity in the region. Najla Said has explored her lifelong experience with Arab identity politics in her book Looking for Palestine.

=== Asian-American identity politics ===
In the political realm of the United States, according to Jane Junn and Natalie Masuoka, the possibilities which exist for an Asian American vote are built upon the assumption that those Americans who are broadly categorized as Asians share a sense of racial identity, and this group consciousness has political consequences. However, the belief in the existence of a monolithic Asian American bloc has been challenged because populations are diverse in terms of national origin and language—no one group is predominant—and scholars suggest that these many diverse groups favor groups which share their distinctive national origin over any belief in the existence of a pan-ethnic racial identity. According to the 2000 Census, more than six national origin groups are classified collectively as Asian American, and these include: Chinese (23%), Filipino (18%), Asian Indian (17%), Vietnamese (11%), Korean (11%), and Japanese (8%), along with an "other Asian" category (12%). In addition, the definitions which are applied to racial categories in the United States are uniquely American constructs that Asian American immigrants may not adhere to upon entry to the United States. Junn and Masuoka find that in comparison to blacks, the Asian American identity is more latent, and racial group consciousness is more susceptible to the surrounding context.

=== Black and Black feminist identity politics ===
Black feminist identity politics are the identity-based politics derived from the lived experiences of struggles and oppression faced by Black women.

In 1977, the Combahee River Collective (CRC) argued that Black women struggled with facing their oppression due to the sexism present within the Civil Rights Movement and the racism present within second-wave feminism. The CRC coined the term "identity politics", and in their opinion, naming the unique struggle and oppression Black women faced, aided Black women in the U.S. within radical movements and at large. The term "identity politics", in the opinion of those within the CRC, gave Black women a tool, from which they could use to confront the oppression they were facing. The CRC also claimed to expand upon the prior feminist adage that "the personal is political", pointing to their own consciousness-raising sessions, centering of Black speech, and communal sharing of experiences of oppression as practices that expanded the phrase's scope. As mentioned earlier K. Crenshaw, claimed that the oppression of Black women is illustrated in two different directions: race and sex.

In 1988, Deborah K. King coined the term multiple jeopardy, theory that expands on how factors of oppression are all interconnected. King suggested that the identities of gender, class, and race each have an individual prejudicial connotation, which has an incremental effect on the inequity of which one experiences.

In 1991, Nancie Caraway explained from a white feminist perspective that the politics of Black women had to be comprehended by broader feminist movements in the understanding that the different forms of oppression that Black women face (via race and gender) are interconnected, presenting a compound of oppression (Intersectionality).

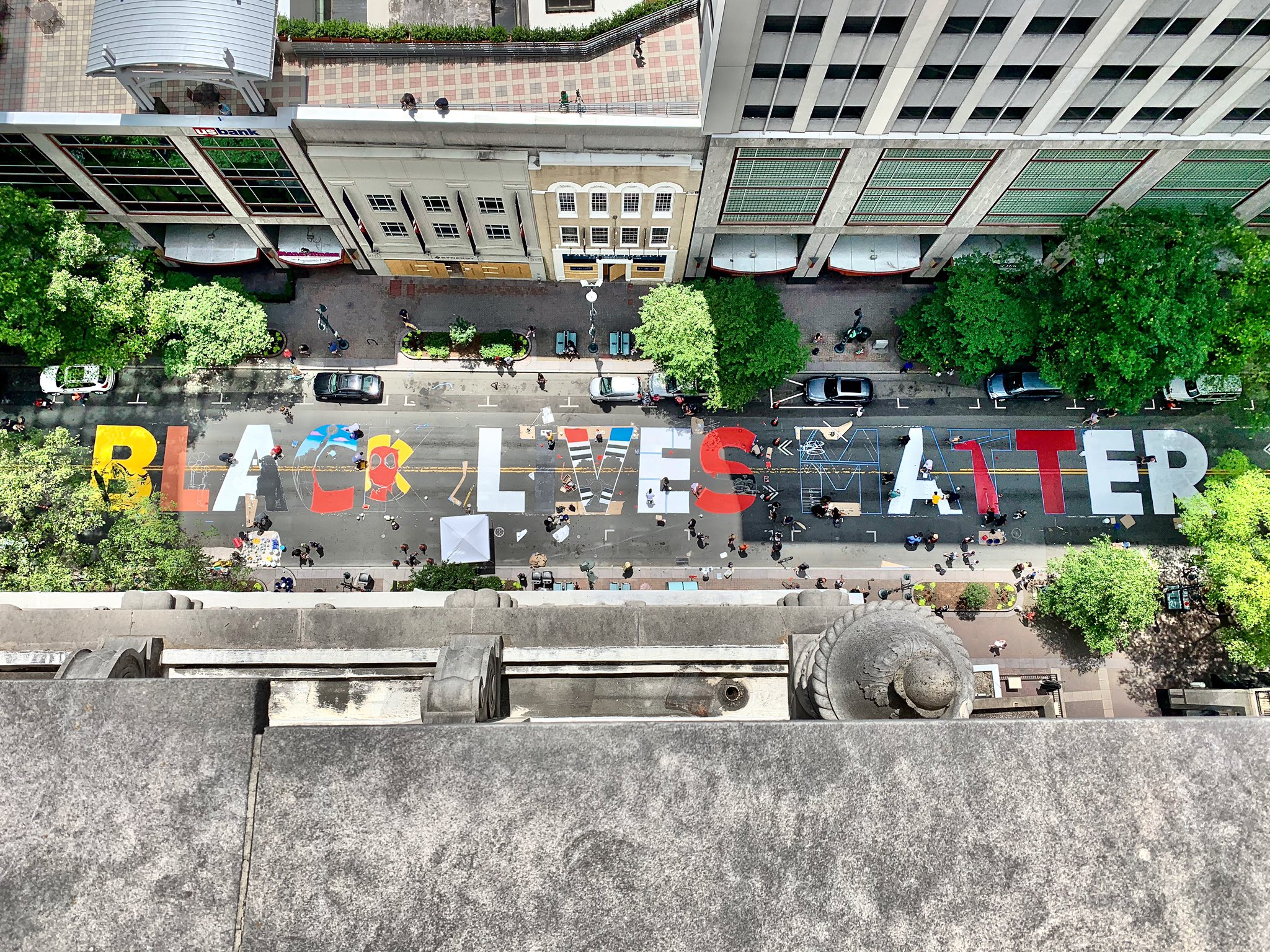
A "Black Lives Matter" mural being painted in Charlotte

A contemporary example of Black identity politics is #BlackLivesMatter which began with a hashtag. In 2013, Alicia Garza, Patrisse Cullors and Opal Tometi created the hashtag in response to the acquittal of George Zimmerman, the man who killed Trayvon Martin in 2012. Michael Brown and Eric Garner were killed by police in 2014, which propelled the #BlackLivesMatter movement forward, first nationally, and then globally. The intention of #BlackLivesMatter was to create more widespread awareness of the way law enforcement engages with the black community and individuals, including claims of excessive force and issues with accountability within law enforcement agencies. The hashtag and proceeding movement garnered a lot of attention from all sides of the political sphere. A counter movement formed the hashtag, #AllLivesMatter, in response to #BlackLivesMatter.

=== White identity politics ===
In 1998, political scientists Jeffrey Kaplan and Leonard Weinberg predicted that, by the late 20th-century, a "Euro-American radical right" would promote a trans-national white identity politics, which would invoke populist grievance narratives and encourage hostility against non-white peoples and multiculturalism. In the United States, mainstream news has identified Donald Trump's presidency as a signal of increasing and widespread utilization of white identity politics within the Republican Party and political landscape. Journalists Michael Scherer and David Smith have reported on its development since the mid-2010s.

Ron Brownstein believed that President Trump uses "White Identity Politics" to bolster his base and that this would ultimately limit his ability to reach out to non-White American voters for the 2020 United States presidential election. (though in exit poll results for the 2020 and 2024 presidential elections Trump improved his margin with non-white Americans) A four-year Reuters and Ipsos analysis concurred that "Trump's brand of white identity politics may be less effective in the 2020 election campaign." Alternatively, examining the same poll, David Smith has written that "Trump's embrace of white identity politics may work to his advantage" in 2020. During the Democratic primaries, presidential candidate Pete Buttigieg publicly warned that the president and his administration were using white identity politics, which he said was the most divisive form of identity politics. Columnist Reihan Salam writes that he is not convinced that Trump uses "white identity politics" given the fact that he still has significant support from liberal and moderate Republicans—who are more favorable toward immigration and the legalization of undocumented immigrants—but believes that it could become a bigger issue as whites become a minority and assert their rights like other minority groups. Salam also states that an increase in "white identity" politics is far from certain given the very high rates of intermarriage and the historical example of the once Anglo-Protestant cultural majority embracing a more inclusive white cultural majority which included Jews, Italians, Poles, Arabs, and Irish.

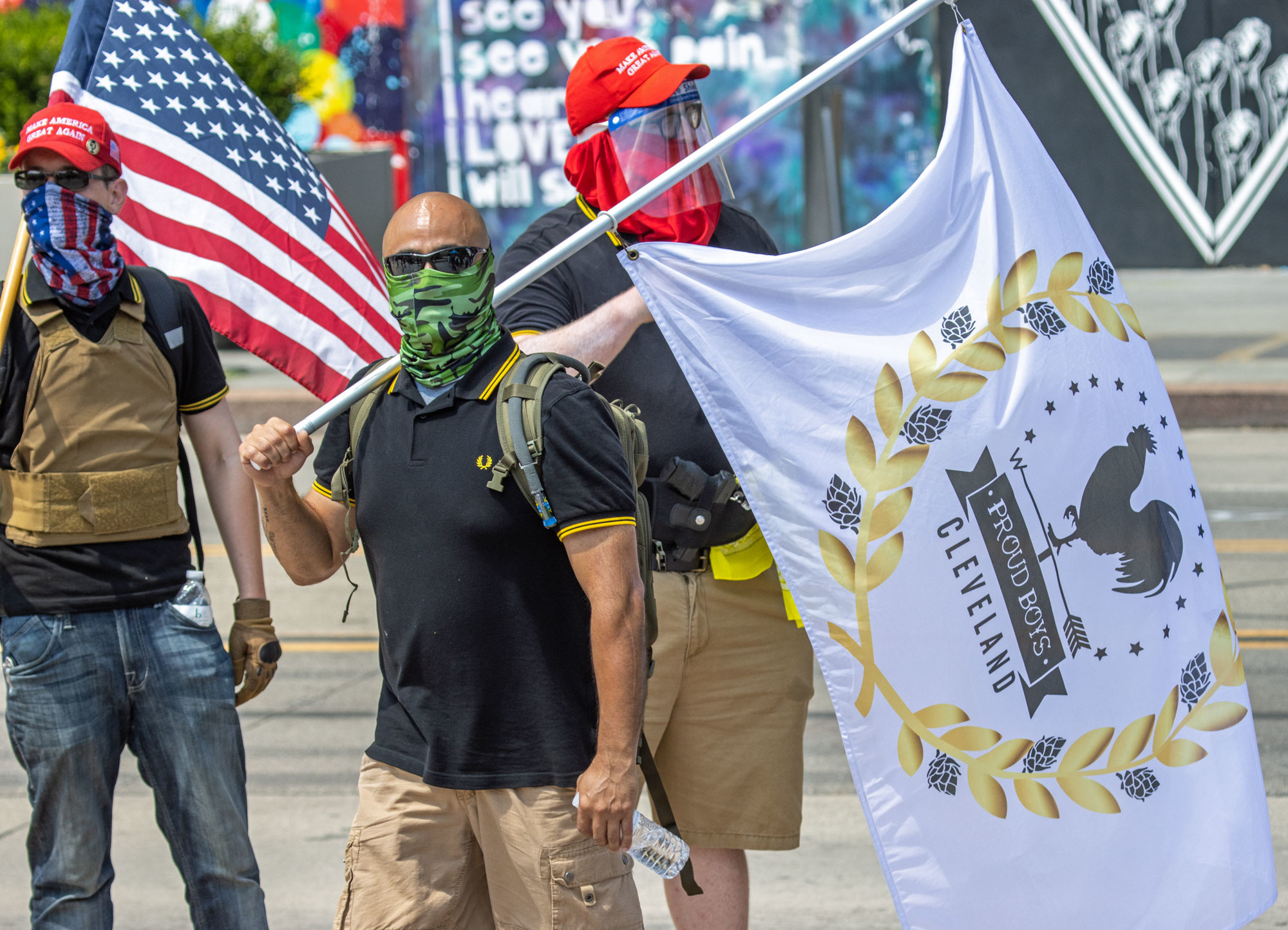
Proud Boys

A contemporary example of "White identity politics" is the right-wing group Proud Boys. Proud Boys was formed by Gavin McInnes in 2016. Members are males who identify as right-wing conservatives. They take part in political protests with the most infamous being January 6, 2021, at the U.S. Capitol, which became violent and led to the arrest of their leader, Henry "Enrique" Tarrio and many others. Proud Boys identify as supporters of Donald Trump for president and are outspoken supporters of Americans having unfettered access to firearms by way of the 2nd amendment of the US constitution, having expressed the belief that gun law reform is a "sinister authoritarian plot" to disarm law abiding citizens. According to an article published by Southern Poverty Law Group, Proud Boys members are regularly affiliated with white nationalist extremists and are known for sharing white nationalist content across social media platforms.

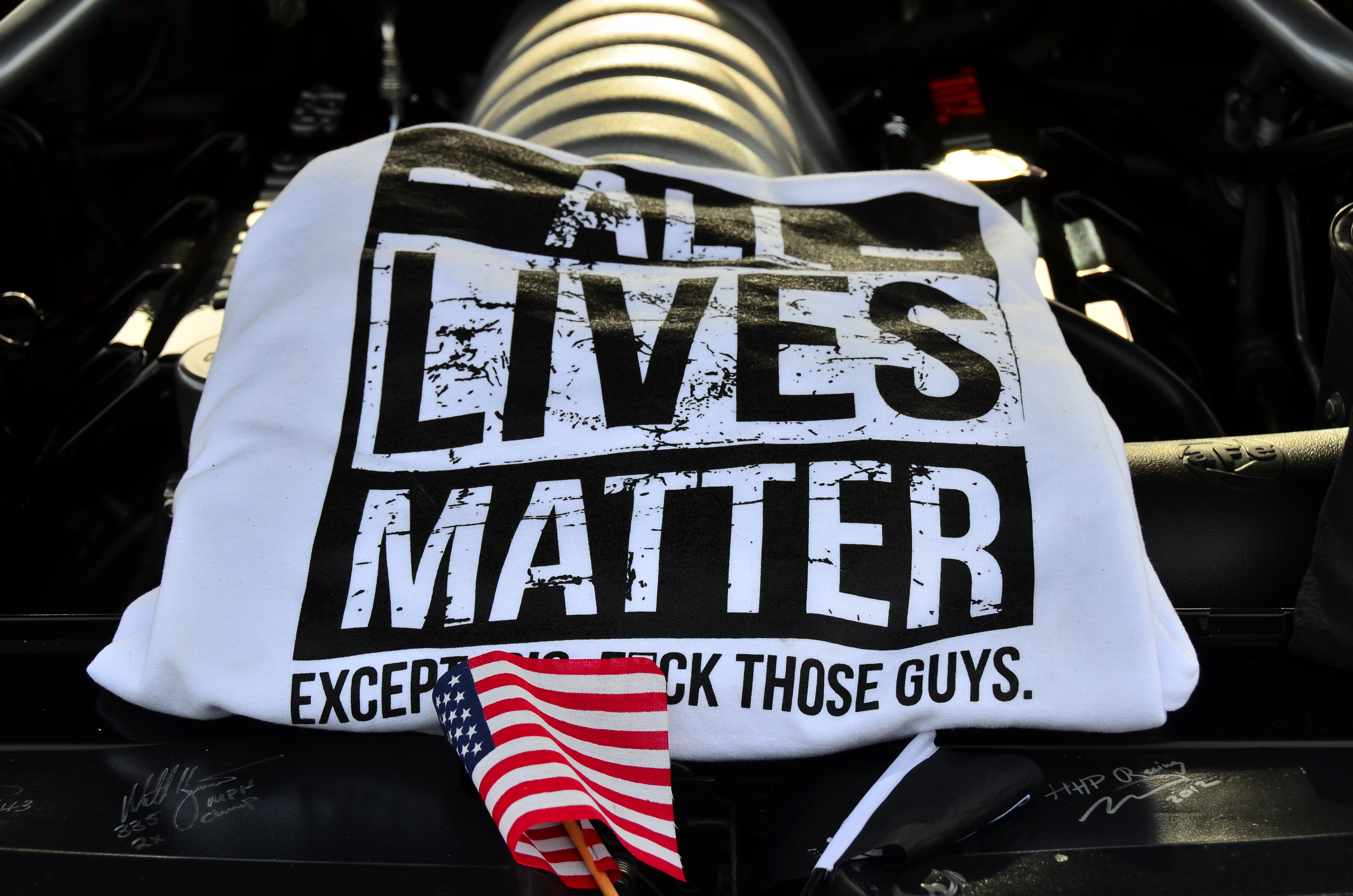
#AllLivesMatter

Another contemporary example is the hashtag movement #AllLivesMatter. #AllLivesMatter began as a counter narrative to #BlackLivesMatter. People who identify with this countermovement use this hashtag to represent what they call "anti-identity" identity politics, which is supposed to symbolize a movement against racial identities, but they've been criticized as being a white nationalist movement. Created, adopted and circulated beginning in 2016, #WhiteLivesMatter exalted themselves as an anti-racist movement, while identifying #BlackLivesMatter as the opposite.

Columnist Ross Douthat has argued that white identity politics have been important to American politics since the Richard Nixon-era of the Republican Party. Historian Nell Irvin Painter has analyzed Eric Kaufmann's thesis that the phenomenon of white identity politics is caused by immigration-derived racial diversity, which reduces the white majority, and an "anti-majority adversary culture". Writing in Vox, political commentator Ezra Klein believes that demographic change has fueled the emergence of white identity politics.

Viet Thanh Nguyen says that "to have no identity at all is the privilege of whiteness, which is the identity that pretends not to have an identity, that denies how it is tied to capitalism, to race, and to war".

=== Hispanic/Latino identity politics ===
According to Leonie Huddy, Lilliana Mason, and S. Nechama Horwitz, the majority of Latinos in the United States identity with the Democratic Party. Latinos' Democratic proclivities can be explained by: ideological policy preferences and an expressive identity based on the defense of Latino identity and status, with a strong support for the latter explanation hinged on an analysis of the 2012 Latino Immigrant National Election Study and American National Election Study focused on Latino immigrants and citizens respectively. When perceiving pervasive discrimination against Latinos and animosity from the Republican party, a strong partisanship preference further intensified, and in return, increased Latino political campaign engagement.

=== Indian politics ===
In India, caste, religion, tribe, ethnicity play a role in electoral politics, government jobs and affirmative actions, development projects.

=== Māori identity politics ===
Due to somewhat competing tribe-based versus pan-Māori concepts, there is both an internal and external utilization of Māori identity politics in New Zealand. Projected outwards, Māori identity politics has been a disrupting force in the politics of New Zealand and post-colonial conceptions of nationhood. Its development has also been explored as causing parallel ethnic identity developments in non-Māori populations. Academic Alison Jones, in her co-written Tuai: A Traveller in Two Worlds, suggests that a form of Māori identity politics, directly oppositional to Pākehā (white New Zealanders), has helped provide a "basis for internal collaboration and a politics of strength".

A 2009, Ministry of Social Development journal identified Māori identity politics, and societal reactions to it, as the most prominent factor behind significant changes in self-identification from the 2006 New Zealand census.

== By religion ==
=== Muslim identity politics ===
Since the 1970s, the interaction of religion and politics has been associated with the rise of Islamist movements in the Middle East. Salwa Ismail posits that the Muslim identity is related to social dimensions such as gender, class, and lifestyles (Intersectionality), thus, different Muslims occupy different social positions in relation to the processes of globalization. Not all uniformly engage in the construction of Muslim identity, and they do not all apply to a monolithic Muslim identity.

The construction of British Muslim identity politics is marked with Islamophobia; Jonathan Brit suggests that political hostility toward the Muslim "other" and the reification of an overarching identity that obscures and denies cross-cutting collective identities or existential individuality are charges made against an assertive Muslim identity politics in Britain. In addition, Brit argues, because Muslim identity politics is seen as internally/externally divisive and therefore counterproductive, as well as the result of manipulation by religious conservatives and local/national politicians, the progressive policies of the anti-racist left have been outflanked. Brit sees the segmentation that divided British Muslims amongst themselves and with the anti-racist alliance in Britain as a consequence of patriarchal, conservative mosque-centered leadership.

A Le Monde/IFOP poll in January 2011 conducted in France and Germany found that a majority felt Muslims are "scattered improperly"; an analyst for IFOP said the results indicated something "beyond linking immigration with security or immigration with unemployment, to linking Islam with a threat to identity".

== By gender ==
Gender identity politics is an approach that views politics, both in practice and as an academic discipline, as having a gendered nature and that gender is an identity that influences how people think. Politics has become increasingly gender political as formal structures and informal 'rules of the game' have become gendered. How institutions affect men and women differently are starting to be analysed in more depth as gender will affect institutional innovation.

=== Women's identity politics ===
A key element of studying electoral behavior in all democracies is political partisanship. In 1996, Eric Plutzer and John F. Zipp examined the election of 1992 election, also commonly referred to as "Year of the Woman", where a then-record- breaking fourteen women ran for governor or U.S. senator, four of whom were successfully elected into office. In analyzing the possibility that male and female voters react differently to the opportunity to cast a vote for a woman, the study provided lent support to the idea that women tend to vote for women and men tend to vote against them. For example, among Republican voters in California, Barbara Boxer ran 10 points behind Bill Clinton among men and about even among women, while Dianne Feinstein ran about 6 points among men but 11 points ahead among women. This gender effect was further amplified for Democratic female candidates who were rated as feminist. These results demonstrate that gender identity has and can function as a cue for voting behavior.

Scholars of social movements and democratic theorists disagree on whether identity politics weaken women's social movements and undermine their influence on public policy or have reverse effects. S. Laurel Weldon argues that when marginalized groups organize around an intersectional social location, knowledge about the social group is generated, feelings of affiliation between group members are strengthened, and the movement's agenda becomes more representative. Specifically for the United States, Weldon suggests that organizing women by race strengthens these movements and improves government responsiveness to both violence against women of color and women in general.

== By sexual orientation ==
=== LGBT ===
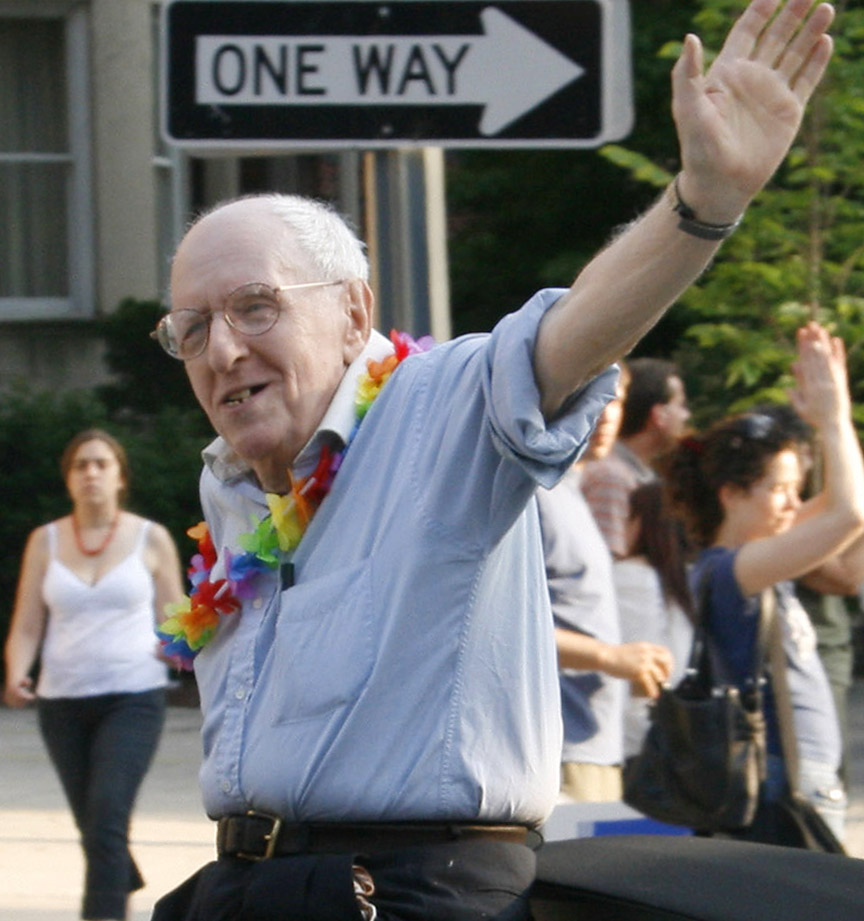
Frank Kameny

By the early-1960s, lesbian, gay, bisexual, and transgender people in the United States were forming more visible communities, and this was reflected in the political strategies of American homophile groups. Frank Kameny, an American astronomer and gay rights activist, had co-founded the Mattachine Society of Washington in 1961. While the society did not take much political activism to the streets at first, Kameny and several members attended the 1963 March on Washington, where having seen the methods used by Black civil rights activists, they then applied them to the homophile movement. Kameny had also been inspired by the black power movements slogan "Black is Beautiful", coining his own term "Gay is Good".

The gay liberation movement of the late-1960s urged lesbians and gay men to engage in radical direct action, and to counter societal shame with gay pride. In the feminist spirit of the personal being political, the most basic form of activism was an emphasis on coming out to family, friends and colleagues, and living life as an openly lesbian or gay person.

By the mid-1970s, an "ethnic model of identity" had surpassed the popularity of both the homophile movement and gay liberation. Proponents operated through a sexual minority framework and advocated either reformism or separatism (notably lesbian separatism).

While the 1970s were the peak of "gay liberation" in New York City and other urban areas in the United States, "gay liberation" was the term still used instead of "gay pride" in more oppressive areas into the mid-1980s, with some organizations opting for the more inclusive "lesbian and gay liberation". Women and transgender activists had lobbied for more inclusive names from the beginning of the movement, but the initialism LGBT, or "queer" as a counterculture shorthand for LGBT, did not gain much acceptance as an umbrella term until much later in the 1980s, and in some areas not until the '90s or even '00s. During this period in the United States, identity politics were largely seen in these communities in the definitions espoused by writers such as self-identified, "black, dyke, feminist, poet, mother" Audre Lorde's view, that lived experience matters, defines us, and is the only thing that grants authority to speak on these topics; that, "If I didn't define myself for myself, I would be crunched into other people's fantasies for me and eaten alive."

== Debates and criticism ==
The term identity politics has been applied retroactively to varying movements that long predate its coinage. Historian Arthur Schlesinger Jr. discussed identity politics extensively in his 1991 book The Disuniting of America. Schlesinger, a strong supporter of liberal conceptions of civil rights, argues that a liberal democracy requires a common basis for culture and society to function. Rather than seeing civil society as already fractured along lines of power and powerlessness (according to race, ethnicity, sexuality, etc.), Schlesinger suggests that basing politics on group marginalization is itself what fractures the civil polity, and that identity politics therefore works against creating real opportunities for ending marginalization. Schlesinger believes that "movements for civil rights should aim toward full acceptance and integration of marginalized groups into the mainstream culture, rather than … perpetuating that marginalization through affirmations of difference."

Similarly in the United Kingdom, author Owen Jones argues that identity politics often marginalize the working class, saying:

In the 1950s and 1960s, left-wing intellectuals who were both inspired and informed by a powerful labour movement wrote hundreds of books and articles on working-class issues. Such work would help shape the views of politicians at the very top of the Labour Party. Today, progressive intellectuals are far more interested in issues of identity. ... Of course, the struggles for the emancipation of women, gays, and ethnic minorities are exceptionally important causes. New Labour has co-opted them, passing genuinely progressive legislation on gay equality and women's rights, for example. But it is an agenda that has happily co-existed with the sidelining of the working class in politics, allowing New Labour to protect its radical flank while pressing ahead with Thatcherite policies.

— Owen Jones, Chavs: The Demonization of the Working Class

Some supporters of identity politics take stances based on Gayatri Chakravorty Spivak's work (namely, "Can the Subaltern Speak?") and have described some forms of identity politics as strategic essentialism, a form which has sought to work with hegemonic discourses to reform the understanding of "universal" goals. Others point out the erroneous logic and the ultimate dangers of reproducing strong identitarian divisions inherent in essentialism. For queer theorist Paul B. Preciado, "movements for the emancipation of subaltern minorities (racial, gender and sexual, etc.) ended up crystallizing into identity politics. Without having dismantled the regimes of racial, sexual or gender oppression, identity politics have ended up renaturalizing and even intensifying the differences."

Anies Baswedan, who has been doing identity politics in Indonesia since 2017, referred to it as unavoidable because every candidate competing in a political contest will always have an identity as their nature. During his 2024 Presidential Candidate, he added that identity politics is a form of support and conveying the aspirations of society that should not be met with concern.

=== "Divide and rule" critique ===
Critics argue that groups based on a particular shared identity (e.g. race, or gender identity) can divert energy and attention from more fundamental issues, similar to the history of divide and rule strategies.

In response to the formulations of the Combahee River Collective that necessitated the organization of women around intersectional identities to bring about broader social change, socialist and radical feminists insisted that, instead, activism would require support for addressing more "basic" forms of oppression. Other feminists also mirrored this sentiment, implying that a politics of issues should supersede a politics of identity. Political scientist Sidney Tarrow also asserts that identity politics can produce insular, sectarian, and divisive movements incapable of expanding membership, broadening appeals, and negotiating with prospective allies. In other words, separate organization undermines movement identity, distracts activists from important issues, and prevents the creation of a common agenda.

=== Classical liberal critique ===
According to Jonathan Haidt, those who criticize identity politics from the right see it as inherently collectivist and prejudicial, in contradiction to the ideals of classical liberalism.

Jordan Peterson has criticized identity politics and argues that it is practiced on both sides of the political divide: "[t]he left plays them on behalf of the oppressed, let's say, and the right tends to play them on behalf of nationalism and ethnic pride". He considers both equally dangerous, saying that what should be emphasized, instead, is individual focus and personal responsibility.

=== Socialist critique ===
Those who criticize identity politics from the left, such as Marxists and Marxist–Leninists, see identity politics as a version of bourgeois nationalism, i.e. as a divide and conquer strategy by the ruling classes to divide people by nationality, race, ethnicity, religion, etc. so as to distract the working class from uniting for the purpose of class struggle and proletarian revolution.

Sociologist Charles Derber asserts that the American left is "largely an identity-politics party" and that it "offers no broad critique of the political economy of capitalism. It focuses on reforms for blacks and women and so forth. But it doesn't offer a contextual analysis within capitalism." Both he and David North of the Socialist Equality Party posit that these fragmented and isolated identity movements which permeate the left have allowed for a far-right resurgence. Cornel West asserted that discourse on racial, gender and sexual orientation identity was "crucial" and "indispensable", but emphasized that it "must be connected to a moral integrity and deep political solidarity that hones in on a financialized form of predatory capitalism. A capitalism that is killing the planet, poor people, working people here and abroad." Historian Gary Gerstle writes that identity politics and multiculturalism thrived in the neoliberal era precisely because these movements did not threaten capital accumulation, and over the same period "pressure on capitalist elites and their supporters to compromise with the working class was vanishing." The ideological space to oppose capitalism shrank with the fall of communism, forcing the left to "redefine their radicalism in alternative terms".

Nancy Fraser argues that political mobilization based on identitarian affirmation leads to surface redistribution—that is, a redistribution within existing structures and relations of production that does not challenge the status quo. Instead, identitarian deconstruction, rather than affirmation, is more conducive to leftist goals of economic redistribution. Marxist academics such as Kurzwelly, Pérez, and Spiegel, writing for Dialectical Anthropology, argue that because the term identity politics is defined differently based on a given author's or activist's ideological position, it is analytically imprecise. The same authors argue in another article that identity politics often leads to reproduction and reification of essentialist notions of identity, which they view as inherently erroneous.

Critiques of identity politics have also been expressed by writers such as Eric Hobsbawm, Todd Gitlin, Adolph Reed, Michael Tomasky, Richard Rorty, Michael Parenti, Jodi Dean, Sean Wilentz, Gabriel Rockhill and philosopher Slavoj Žižek. Hobsbawm, as a Marxist, criticized nationalisms and the principle of national self-determination adopted in many countries after 1919, since in his view national governments are often merely an expression of a ruling class or power, and their proliferation was a source of the wars of the 20th century. Hence, Hobsbawm argues that identity politics, such as queer nationalism, Islamism, Cornish nationalism or Ulster loyalism are just other versions of bourgeois nationalism. The view that identity politics (rooted in challenging racism, sexism, and the like) obscures class inequality is widespread in the United States and other Western nations. This framing ignores how class-based politics are identity politics themselves, according to Jeff Sparrow. Marc James Léger has noted that the cross-class alliances that are proposed by identity movements have ideological affinity with not only nationalism but the political right and that moreover, the micro-political emphasis on difference and lifestyle associates identity politics with the petty-bourgeois concerns of the professional-managerial class.

Kurzwelly noted a potential argument in favor of identity politics and strategic essentialism that even though race is not real, the perception of it as real and the resulting racism may necessitate using those categories to correct such injustices. However, he raised four main points of critique. Firstly, it perpetuates the incorrect essentialist presumptions it challenges and risks unintended consequences. Secondly, it assumes that identity is necessarily the main cause of their oppression, which is not always accurate even if they are correlated. Thirdly, it may force people to adopt an identity they do not want, such as when "gender-specific legislation in Argentina forced gender-non-conforming persons to choose between seeking justice and expressing their identity." Fourthly, it "stands in an uneasy tension with a politics that prioritises redistribution of means of production and seeks sustained change in economic relations". Kurzwelly instead advocated for "a shift from justice based on fixed categories to justice based on processes".

=== Intersectional critique ===
In her journal article Mapping the Margins: Intersectionality, Identity Politics and Violence against Women of Color, Kimberlé Crenshaw treats identity politics as a process that brings people together based on a shared aspect of their identity. Crenshaw applauds identity politics for bringing African Americans (and other non-white people), gays and lesbians, and other oppressed groups together in community and progress. But she critiques it because "it frequently conflates or ignores intragroup differences." Crenshaw argues that for Black women, at least two aspects of their identity are the subject of oppression: their race and their sex. Thus, although identity politics are useful, we must be aware of the role of intersectionality. Nira Yuval-Davis supports Crenshaw's critiques in Intersectionality and Feminist Politics and explains that "Identities are individual and collective narratives that answer the question 'who am/are I/we?"

In Mapping the Margins, Crenshaw illustrates her point using the Clarence Thomas/Anita Hill controversy. Anita Hill accused US Supreme Court Justice nominee Clarence Thomas of sexual harassment; Thomas would be the second African American judge on the Supreme Court. Crenshaw argues that Hill was then deemed anti-Black in the movement against racism, and although she came forward on the feminist issue of sexual harassment, she was excluded because when considering feminism, it is the narrative of white middle-class women that prevails. Crenshaw concludes that acknowledging intersecting categories when groups unite on the basis of identity politics is better than ignoring categories altogether.

=== Queer critique ===
In postmodernist analyses, labels are a form of regulation, and any activism based on them increases their regulatory power over subordinate groups. Consequently, "identity politics appears to be narrow, political, state-centered activism that fails to adequately address the cultural bases of power." This view responds to the emergence of queer politics in the late 1980s, exemplified by the group Queer Nation. Scholars have identified queer politics as the opposite of identity politics, aiming to unite diverse marginalized groups and transcend traditional categories.

The foundationalist reasoning of identity politics tends to assume that an identity must first be in place in order for political interests to be elaborated and, subsequently, political action to be taken. My argument is that there need not be a "doer behind the deed," but that the "doer" is variably constructed in and through the deed.

— Judith Butler, Gender Trouble

Writers in the field of queer theory have at times argued that queer, despite generations of specific use to describe a "non-heterosexual" sexual orientation, no longer needs to refer to any specific sexual orientation at all; that it is now only about "disrupting the mainstream", with author David M. Halperin arguing that straight people may now also self-identify as "queer". However, many LGBT people believe that "queer heterosexuality" is an oxymoron and offensive form of cultural appropriation which not only robs gays and lesbians of their identities, but makes invisible and irrelevant the actual, lived experience of oppression that causes them to be marginalized in the first place. "It desexualizes identity, when the issue is precisely about a sexual identity."

Criticism of identity politics also appears in contemporary queer activism. The insurrectionary anarchist network Bash Back!, for example, understood identity politics as being fundamentally reformist and based on a fallacy of coherent communities.

== Representation in modern democracies ==
One of the major challenges in providing quality representation within all modern democracies comes from the many different ways in conceptualizing representation. Hanna Fenichel Pitkin, in her seminal study The Concept of Representation, identifies four forms: descriptive, substantive, formalistic, and symbolic representation.

=== Formalistic representation ===
Formalistic representation focuses on the formal procedures of institutions and has two dimensions: authorization and accountability. Authorization looks at the means by which a representative obtains their position in office. Accountability centers around the ability of constituents to punish representatives for failing to act according to their wishes or the responsiveness of the representative to the constituents.

=== Symbolic representation ===
Symbolic representation involves constituents' perception of their representatives, including the represented's feelings of being fairly and effectively represented. Work on symbolic representation by scholars of race and ethnic politics indicate that marginalized group's presence cues the legitimacy of both outcomes and procedure. A study by Nancy Scherer and Brett Curry was concerned with the question if racial diversity on the federal bench impact citizens' views of the U.S. courts. They found that African-Americans had more trust in the legitimacy of the federal courts as the proportion of African-American judges rose. Another study by Matthew Hayes and Matthew V. Hibbing evaluated that when the level of black representation was below proportional levels, perceptions of fairness and satisfaction decreased (e.g. symbolic representation).

=== Descriptive representation ===
Descriptive representation refers to whether officeholders resemble those being represented. It is concerned only with who a representative is, such as their race, ethnicity, gender, sexual identity, etc.

=== Substantive representation ===
Substantive representation is defined as having one's policy views expressed by an elected representative, independent of whether the representatives resemble their constituents and their social and demographic identities. There have been studies that examined the substantive benefits of minority groups's representation. In a series of experiments by Amanda Clayton, Diana Z. O'Brien, and Jennifer M. Piscopo, these researchers controlled both the makeup of the decision-making body and the outcome reached. Across all decision outcomes and issue topics, women's equal presence legitimized the decision-making process for respondents. Moreover, gender balance helped improve perceptions of substantive legitimacy when the decision-making body reached an anti-feminist decision. This effect was more pronounced among men, who tend to hold less certain views on women's rights

== See also ==
- Anti-gender movement
- Chauvinism
- Consciousness raising
- Culture war
- Diversity, equity, and inclusion
- Diversity (politics)
- Global majority
- Grievance studies affair
- Kyriarchy
- Legitimating ideology
- Machismo
- Nationalism and sports
- Othering
- Political consciousness
- Politics of resentment
- Recognition justice
- Single-issue politics
- Votebank
