= Social breakdown thesis =

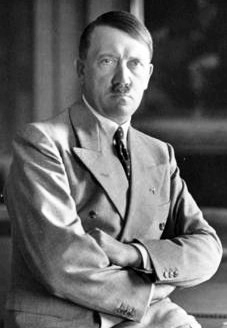
Social breakdown thesis was initially considered an explanation for the rise of Adolf Hitler (pictured) in Germany but fell out of favour following greater empirical research.

The social breakdown thesis (also known as the anomie–social breakdown thesis) is a theory that posits that individuals that are socially isolated — living in atomized, socially disintegrated societies — are particularly likely to support right-wing populist parties.

According to social breakdown theory, when traditional social structures based on class and religion are breaking down, individuals lack a sense of belonging and are attracted to ethnic nationalist parties because, according to psychological research, it leads to an increased sense of self-esteem and efficacy.

== Support ==
Some studies have shown that support for the French Front National and the German Die Republikaner correlates positively with a high urban level of social isolation and low religious and trade union ties. A Dutch study has linked social isolation and support for the far-right.

== Criticism ==
Social breakdown thesis was at one time a popular theory to explain the rise of Nazism during the interwar years in Weimar Germany but fell out of favour after greater empirical research. Jens Rydgren argues that social breakdown theory has little empirical support within the academic literature on this topic. The academics Fella and Ruzza argue that a blanket social breakdown thesis is an insufficient explanation for the rise of far-right parties given the different voting profiles of European far-right parties.

== See also ==
- Ethnic competition thesis
- Linked fate
- Modernisation losers thesis
- Relative deprivation thesis
