= Group consciousness =

Group consciousness may refer to:

- Collective consciousness, the set of shared beliefs, ideas and moral attitudes which operate as a unifying force within society.
- Group consciousness (political science)
- Vijnanakaya, one of the seven Sarvāstivāda Abhidharma Buddhist scriptures.
