= Modernisation losers thesis =

Theory about far-right support

The modernization losers thesis, or modernization losers theory, is a theory associated with the academic Hans-Georg Betz that posits that individuals support far-right political parties because they wish to undo changes associated with modernization.

The modernization losers theory has been seen as a combination of two theories (a) the relative deprivation theory and (b) the social breakdown theory. Betz suggests that the move from an industrial to post-industrial economy is one aspect of this 'modernization'. The academic Jens Rydgren describes the thesis as 'one of the central tenets in the literature on the new radical right-wing parties'.

== See also ==
- Ethnic competition thesis
- Linked fate
