= Entitativity =

Concept in social psychology

In social psychology, entitativity is the degree to which a group is perceived as a cohesive, unified entity. It describes how much a collection of individuals is seen as a group and bonded by common attributes, such as shared goals or traits. Perceived entitativity occurs when people view an aggregate of individuals as a single entity, attributing to them common characteristics or a collective purpose. Thus, a group is seen as a genuine group when its members' behaviors are seen as stemming from shared goals or traits.

Research shows that people consistently distinguish between different types of groups based on perceived entitativity. Intimacy groups, such as family and friends, are generally considered the most entitative. Task groups, like committees, come next, followed by social categories (e.g., gender, race). Finally, loose associations—such as people who like classical music or those waiting in line at a bank—are seen as the least entitative.

Entitativity plays a key role in shaping how individuals perceive and evaluate social groups and their members. People tend to make more polarized judgments and have stronger emotional responses towards highly entitative groups, which impacts in-group and out-group dynamics. Individuals are more likely to rely on stereotypes when assessing group members, as well as recall more information about highly entitative groups. For in-groups, greater entitativity can enhance group members' sense of group identification and positivity towards the group.

== Definition ==
The term entitativity was introduced by Donald T. Campbell in 1958 to refer to the perception of a group as a cohesive, unified entity. In other words, entitativity is how groupy a collection of individuals is. Campbell defined entitativity as "the degree of having the nature of an entity," which distinguishes a true group from a mere collection of individuals. He introduced the term to explain why some groups, such as families or teams, are perceived as real groups, whereas others, like people waiting in line, are seen as loose aggregates. He proposed that entitativity could be empirically measured. Over time, scholars have expanded on Campbell's definition, proposing that entitativity arises from individuals' perceptions of meaningful connections within a group, based on the attributes and relationships they observe. According to these definitions, entitativity is not an inherent property of a group but a psychological perception that determines whether a collection of individuals is seen as a cohesive social unit.

Brewer et al. argue that entitativity can be understood as the perception that group members share a common origin, which implies that their similarities in attitudes or behavior stem from a shared source. They further argue that this common origin can come from two main factors: essence and agency. Essence refers to inherent, fixed traits that group members are believed to share as part of their identity. Agency, on the other hand, relates to the shared goals and collective action of group members, where the group is seen as unified by its common purpose. Brewer et al. theorize that both essence and agency contribute to perceptions of group entitativity, meaning a group can be viewed as entitative due to shared traits, collective purpose, or both.

== Relationship with homogeneity ==
Homogeneity refers to the similarity among group members, whereas entitativity refers to the perception that a group forms a cohesive, unified entity. Homogeneity is one of several cues that can lead to perceptions of entitativity, but it is not always sufficient on its own. For example, a group of students simply wearing the same color shirt may not be sufficient for others to view them as part of the same group. However, when visual similarity (like matching shirts) is combined with other factors, such as shared identity cues like personality traits or academic disciplines, the perception of an entitative group becomes stronger.

The role of homogeneity in fostering entitativity varies across different group types. In social categories, such as race or gender, homogeneity is often a significant factor in perceptions of groupness. However, in intimacy groups or task-oriented groups, high entitativity can be perceived even in the absence of strong homogeneity, due to factors such as shared goals or close interpersonal connections.

Experimental research further demonstrates that entitativity and homogeneity can operate independently. Researchers have found that manipulating cues of entitativity alters entitativity perceptions without necessarily changing similarity judgments, while altering similarity can increase perceptions of homogeneity without increasing entitativity. This empirical evidence indicates that while homogeneity and entitativity are related constructs, they have distinct influences on how groups are perceived.

== Relationship with essentialism ==
Essentialism and entitativity are related but distinct concepts. Essentialism refers to the belief that members of a particular social category share a fixed, underlying nature or essence, a belief that some scholars have considered a cognitive bias. Essentialism therefore incorporates beliefs of both entitativity and naturalness. The entitativity component refers to the perception that group members are fundamentally alike due to some shared traits, allowing for inferences about their common characteristics to be drawn. In contrast, the naturalness component suggests that these shared traits are inherent and unchangeable.

Entitativity, however, is the perception of a group as a unified entity, which is theorized to come from two main sources: a belief in essence-based similarities or from group members' shared goals and collective actions. Therefore, while essentialism and entitativity share common ground as constructs, they diverge in important ways. Essentialism includes the perception of entitativity, but also emphasizes the fixed, unchangeable nature of the group's traits. Entitativity, meanwhile, arises from perceived essence-based similarities along with perceived agency that stems from collective purpose. This means that each construct incorporates elements of the other: essentialism involves entitativity and naturalness, while entitativity involves both essence and agency. Thus, the two concepts overlap but are not the same. Entitativity reflects people's understanding of the social relationships and interdependence among group members, while essentialism emphasizes the belief in the group's permanence and inalterability.

Empirical evidence highlights the distinction between the two constructs. Groups can vary in their levels of perceived essentiality and entitativity. Groups can be perceived as high in entitativity without being essentialized, such as task groups with collective goals but no assumed fixed traits. Conversely, some social categories, like gender or ethnicity, may be strongly essentialized but perceived as less entitative if cohesion or interdependence is low. Moreover, perceived entitativity and essentialism also predict different social outcomes. Entitativity tends to shape perceptions based on group cohesion and shared goals, such as perceptions of collective intentionality and responsibility, while essentialism tends to predicts outcome tied to perceived permanence and inherent group traits, such as stereotype endorsement. Thus, entitativity and essentialism are distinct both in their content structure and in their predictive effects.

== Factors that enhance entitativity ==
Perceptions of entitativity can be shaped by various antecedents—elements or conditions that precede and contribute to the perception of entitativity. Lickel et al. categorize these antecedents into three main types. First, individual traits or cultural values may affect entitativity perceptions. Second, contextual influences, like whether groups are in competition, can shape how entitative a group appears in specific situations. Finally, certain characteristics of a group such as its structure or level of homogeneity, can serve as cues for perceptions of entitativity. These group features, without any need for comparison to another group, can influence how entitative a group appears to observers. Among these three types of antecedents to entitativity, the group features have received the most attention.

=== Group features ===
When Campbell introduced the concept of entitativity, he proposed that people rely on specific perceptual cues to intuitively determine which collections of individuals form a cohesive group and which do not. For example, a crowd of spectators at a football game may initially appear as a disorganized collection of individuals, but when they shout the same cheers or show synchronized emotions, this display of similarity and unity increases their perceived entitativity. Campbell identified four key qualities of groups can that help individuals make these intuitive judgments of groupness.

Groups where individuals are more proximal are proposed to be perceived as more entitative.

The first cue is proximity: Campbell proposed that the closer together individuals are within a space, the more likely they are to be seen as part of the same group. Proximity acts as a visual cue, as people naturally assume that elements close to each other have some form of association or shared purpose. For instance, pedestrians standing together at a bus stop may be perceived as a group because they are positioned closely within the same area.

Secondly, Campbell proposed that similarity serves another cue to entitativity. Individuals who share visual, behavioral, or other similarities are more readily perceived as members of the same group. This similarity can be in terms of clothing, appearance, or other observable traits. For example, sports fans dressed in the same team colors are often assumed to share common goals or loyalties, giving them an increased sense of entitativity through visual uniformity.

Groups where individuals share visual similarity are perceived as more entitative.

Third, Campbell defined perceptions of common fate as arising when individuals or elements move in the same direction or exhibit coordinated behavior over time, making them more likely to be viewed as part of a single group. This cue of common fate suggests a shared objective or coordinated purpose among members. For example, a marching band moving in sync signals collective unity and purpose to observers.

Finally, Campbell describes pregnance (or Pragnanz), good continuity, and good figure as cues to entitativity. These concepts draw on principles of Gestalt psychology, which suggests that people naturally group elements that form a recognizable shape, line, or pattern, associating them as components of a larger organization. Campbell states that perception that elements that align within a coherent spatial organization, pattern, or structure are seen as part of the same unit. For instance, people positioned in a circle or line are more likely to be perceived as a unified group than those scattered randomly.

More recent research has empirically identified specific group characteristics that serve as antecedents to perceptions of entitativity. In one influential article, Lickel et al. (2000) found that of the features proposed by Campbell, interaction among group members, perceptions of shared goals, shared outcomes, and member similarity were all positively correlated with perceptions of entitativity. In contrast, group size, duration, and permeability (the ease of entering and leaving the group) showed little to no relationship with entitativity after accounting for these other factors, suggesting that they play a more limited role in shaping perceptions of group cohesion. Notably, these findings were consistent across both U.S. and Polish participant samples, underscoring the generalizability of these findings.

Moreover, while how much interaction is occurring among members significantly influences how much a group is perceived to be a cohesive unit, it is not only the quantity of interaction that matters, but also the quality or style of interactions. For instance, groups that are described as interacting with a more intimate relational style, such as communal sharing, are perceived to be more entitative compared to groups that interact with a market pricing relational style.

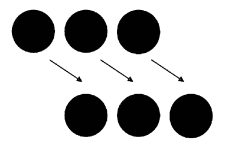
A collection of individuals moving in sync can increase perceptions of entitativity.

Visible, coordinated actions can also serve as cues for perceiving shared purpose and unity, further enhancing the perception of group entitativity. Research has found that when animated characters demonstrated coordinated movements, participants inferred common goals and perceived the group as more cohesive, which led to higher entitativity ratings. This finding extends beyond animated characters to human interactions: when people are seen as moving in synchronized rhythms—such as waving in unison—they are perceived as having greater rapport and entitativity.

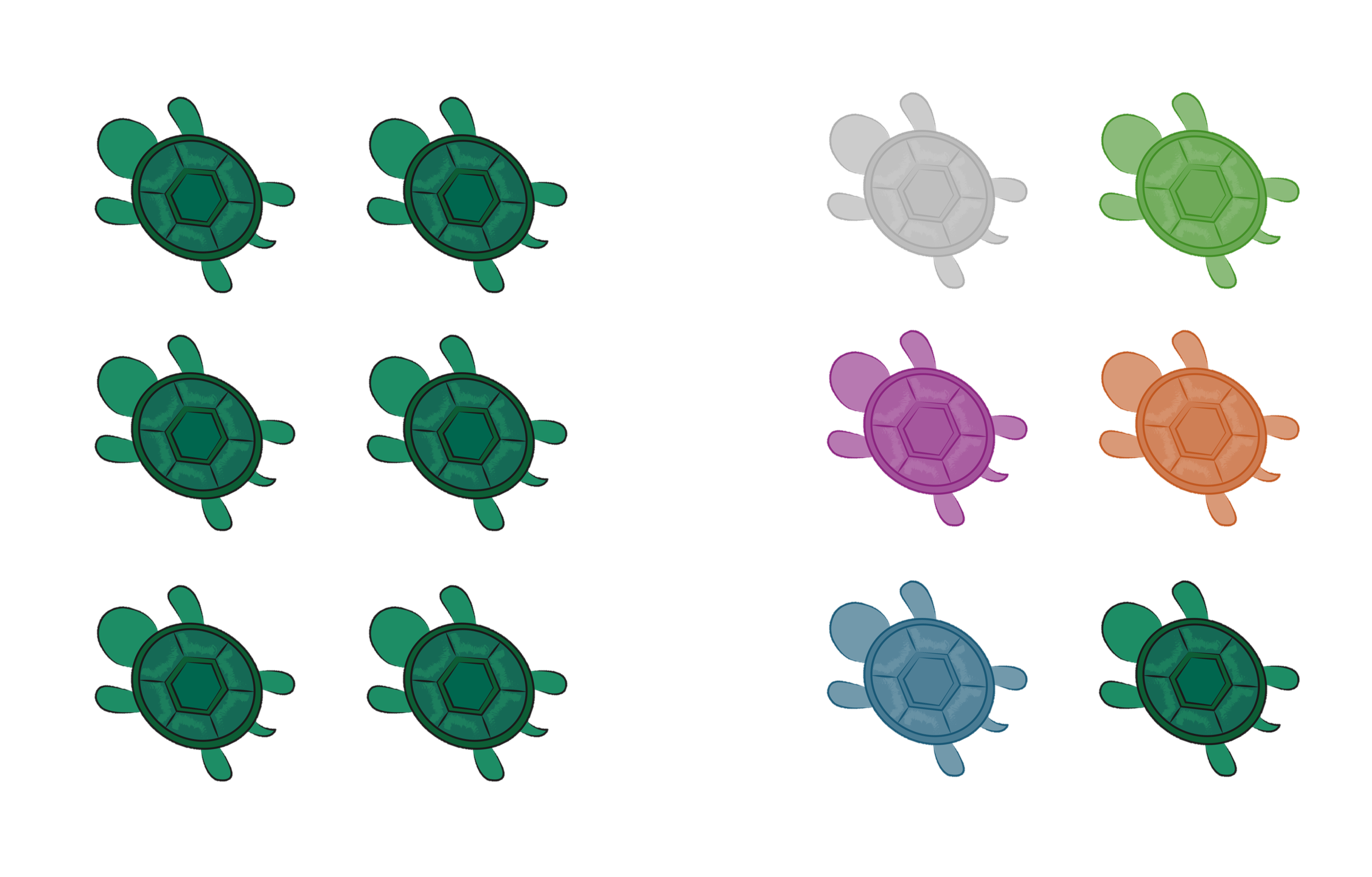
Group members that share similar physical appearances, such as color, are perceived to have more entitativity.

Empirical research also suggests that physical and psychological similarity among group members, whether in appearance, background, or personality traits, increases perceptions of group cohesion or entitativity. For example, groups with members who share physical traits such as skin color—often seen as essential characteristics—are perceived as more entitative. This pattern extends to groups with shared social backgrounds and similar personality traits, all of which contribute to a stronger impression of entitativity. These findings indicate that when group members exhibit commonalities in physical or psychological attributes, they are more likely to be seen as forming a cohesive, meaningful unit.

Building on the work of Lickel et al. (2000), subsequent research has focused primarily on interactivity and similarity as key antecedents of entitativity. For example, researchers have developed measures that assess entitativity alongside related factors like interactivity, similarity of goals, and shared characteristics to advance the study of entitativity.

=== Individual and cultural differences ===
Research has also found that individual differences, such as cognitive needs and motivations, can influence how people perceive entitativity. Certain traits, like a high need or motivation to construct and organize knowledge about the world make some individuals more likely to see groups as entitative. These differences impact how readily individuals apply categorical thinking, view groups as having stable, shared characteristics, and process social information as a whole rather than in separate parts.

The need for closure is an example of an individual difference theorized to influence the tendency to perceive entitativity. Need for closure refers to the desire for clear, definitive answers and a strong aversion to ambiguity. Individuals with high need for closure value order and structure, preferring predictable, stable knowledge that is unchallenged by exceptions. For such individuals, ambiguous or disorderly situations are uncomfortable and even distressing, as they seek to make judgments that minimize uncertainty. Research suggests that a high need for closure leads people to view groups as more entitative because it encourages them to rely on broad generalizations when making social judgments. This inductive use of social categories allows individuals with a strong need for closure to quickly categorize and make sense of groups. High need for closure can also promote beliefs in essentialism, leading to a stronger perception of groups as having core, unchanging traits.

Certainty orientation is another individual difference that can shape perceptions of entitativity. Certainty orientation refers to an individual's motivation to seek clarity and predictability, which can lead them to prefer organized, cohesive social structures. Certainty-oriented individuals are particularly motivated to avoid ambiguity and may be more inclined to see social groups as having clear boundaries and cohesion, which helps them manage uncertainty by perceiving social environments as predictable and organized. This motivation leads to a heightened perception of group entitativity.

Lay theories—individuals' implicit beliefs about human behavior, traits, and social structures—can also shape perceptions of entitativity by influencing assumptions about member similarity and group stability. Drawing on implicit theory, research suggests that individuals who hold entity theories, believing personalities are fixed and unchanging, are more inclined to view group members as homogenous and similar. In contrast, incremental theorists, who see personalities as malleable and dynamic, are less likely to perceive groups as unchanging. This tendency means that entity theorists may be more prone to attribute stable, shared traits to group members, which strengthens their perceptions of the group as a unified and entitative whole.

Cultural factors may also play a role in shaping perceptions of entitativity, as culture influences how individuals view and prioritize groups. In collectivist cultures, where personal interdependence and group harmony are central, groups are seen as integral to identity and social organization. This contrasts with individualistic cultures, which emphasize personal autonomy and individual goals. Consequently, for individuals in collectivist cultures, this orientation toward the collective can increase attentiveness to cues of groupness, such as similarity and common goals, making them more likely to attribute entitativity to groups, even in minimal group settings. Individuals from collectivist cultures may thus be more inclined to perceive social groups as more cohesive and unified, compared to individuals from individualistic cultures who may be more likely to perceive groups as collections of individuals rather than unified entities.

=== Context ===
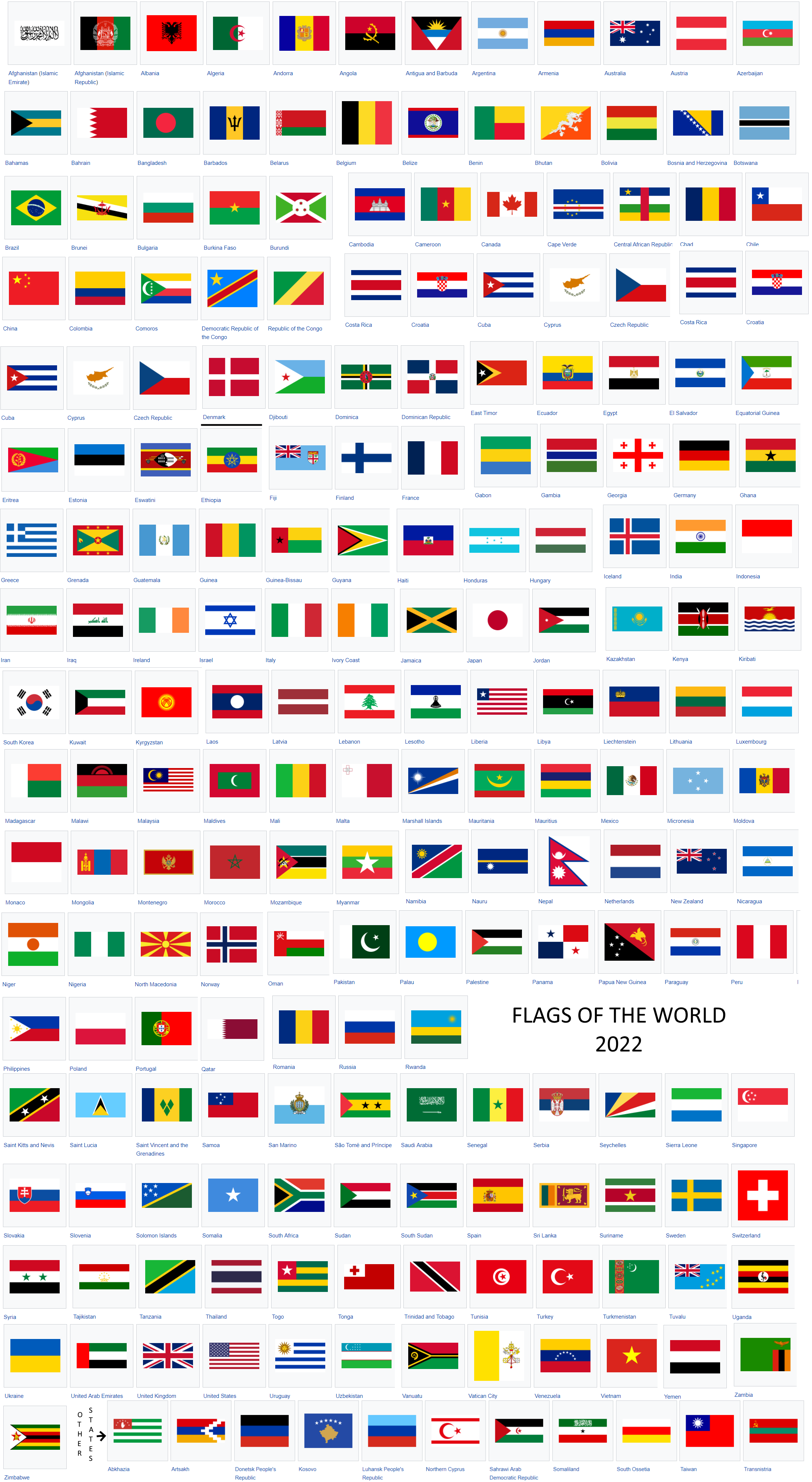
Symbols, such as flags, can increase entitativity perceptions of a group.

Context can also shape perceptions of entitativity, with certain situational factors making groups appear more unified or cohesive. For instance, in competitive contexts where groups are in direct conflict or rivalry, individuals are more likely to perceive high entitativity in opposing groups. This effect is thought to stem from the interdependence created by competition, where the actions of one group directly influence the status or outcomes of the other group. In these settings, the perceiver recognizes that their own actions, or those of their in-group, impact the out-group, heightening the sense that each group is a cohesive entity with shared goals and a unified purpose. Thus, competitive or interdependent contexts can amplify the perception of group unity and foster a sense of entitativity that may not be as strong in more neutral or cooperative scenarios.

Symbols, such as flags or logos, can also serve as cues to entitativity by making groups appear more cohesive and unified, even in the absence of other unifying features. Research shows that simply having a symbol enhances perceptions of a group's entitativity, effectiveness, and even threat potential, as symbols increase perceived cohesiveness and allow group members to project unity and strength.

== Outcomes ==
People naturally and consistently judge groups on their level of entitativity, distinguishing between group types based on how cohesive and unified they appear. These perceptions of entitativity have significant consequences for how people interpret and respond to groups. Individuals' assumptions about how members within different types of groups are interconnected and relate to one another guide how they make inferences and interpret information about group dynamics and predict members' behavior. As a result, entitativity shapes judgments, expectations, and even behaviors toward group members, influencing social interactions, stereotyping, and intergroup attitudes.

=== Group outcomes ===
==== Stereotyping ====
A key outcome of perceived entitativity, especially when it is based on shared essence (inherent, fixed traits), is the stereotyping of group members. Stereotypes represent a person's knowledge, beliefs, and expectations about a social group, leading to the generalization, and even overgeneralization, of a set of traits or beliefs to all members within a group. Perceived entitativity serves as a precondition for stereotyping, as it leads people to see a group as cohesive and its members as highly similar. When people perceive a group as entitative, they are more inclined to see the group as homogenous, meaning its members are viewed as sharing similar traits and characteristics. This perceived homogeneity facilitates the formation of stereotypes by encouraging the perception that individual group members are interchangeable, with limited uniqueness in traits or abilities. For instance, upon observing a single behavior in one group member, people may infer that behavior as a defining trait of the entire group, thus promoting generalized judgments about group members as a whole.

When people view a group as highly entitative, they are more likely to infer traits based on the actions of one group member and then apply those traits to the entire group. This process, known as spontaneous trait transference, reinforces the perception of group members as interchangeable. When a group is perceived as high in entitativity, trait inferences about one member's behavior are more likely to be transferred to others in the group.

==== Judgments and perceptions ====
Perceived entitativity significantly influences how individuals form judgments about groups, often leading to more polarized and extreme evaluations. When a group is perceived as highly entitative—that is, cohesive and unified—individuals tend to make more polarized judgments, categorizing the group in starkly positive or negative terms. This polarization effect has been consistently documented across studies on group perception and applies to various judgments, including perceptions of warmth and competence. For instance, groups perceived as highly entitative may be judged as either very warm or very cold and as having a high degree of competence, depending on the context and cues provided. When a group is perceived as threatening, high entitativity can intensify negative perceptions, as people are more likely to focus on potential threats posed by the group, which heightens prejudice, stereotyping, and group-based biases. The polarization effect can also manifest in positive judgments, such as judgments of intelligence.

Moreover, perceived entitativity can influence the way individuals perceive group members' behavior. Research has shown that when groups are perceived as having high entitativity, individuals tend to make more dispositional inferences about group members' behavior, attributing actions to the group's inherent qualities rather than situational factors, an instance of the fundamental attribution error. For more entitative groups, social perceivers are more likely to overestimate the role of group characteristics in shaping individual behavior while disregarding external influences.

Another significant outcome of perceiving a group as entitative is the reduced attribution of mind to individual group members. Mind attribution involves perceiving a target as possessing mental states such as beliefs, desires, and emotions. Empirical research has found that people are less likely to attribute mental states to members of entitative groups compared to individuals. This effect is especially pronounced when the group is perceived as unified, as individuals are more likely to view them as a homogenous collective rather than as distinct persons with individual thoughts and feelings. This reduction in mind attribution leads to a dehumanizing effect, as group members are seen more as interchangeable representatives of the group than as unique individuals. The perception of a group as entitative, in this sense, not only influences how people evaluate group members' behaviors but also shapes the degree to which they are seen as fully autonomous, sentient beings with personal experiences and emotions.

Entitativity also influences how information about groups is processed. For high-entitativity groups, initial information is often used as a basis for forming an overall impression, and later information is integrated into this existing mental representation. This contrasts with how information about low-entitativity groups is processed, where individual behaviors are often stored separately until an overall judgment of the group is required. Consequently, individuals are more likely to recall information about highly entitative groups more readily and make quicker, more extreme judgments whether positive or negative.

==== Prejudice and collective blame ====
Perceived entitativity can contribute to increased prejudice against certain groups, as well as to collective blame toward a group for the actions of a few of its members. The relationship between entitativity and prejudice is robust and has been supported across various contexts, including racism, prejudice towards homosexuality, and negative attitudes towards mental disorders. Further, a meta-analysis of prior research revealed that perceptions of out-group entitativity significantly predicted prejudice. Notably, this relationship was especially strong when entitativity was conceptualized in terms of an essence or shared identity, as opposed to merely a group's agency or capacity for coordinated action. This essence-based entitativity reflects the perception of an out-group as fundamentally different and uniform, which can amplify negative attitudes toward the group as a whole.

Research suggests that individuals also perceive prejudice as more justified when it seems rooted in the collective interests or defense of an entitative group. People are more accepting of prejudice against racial, national, or religious groups when they view it as a rational response to protect a group's shared interests, especially when the group is highly entitative. This suggests that entitativity can act as a legitimizing factor for expressing prejudices, as it allows individuals to frame biases as protective rather than as inherently unfair or harmful.

Beyond prejudice, entitativity also affects how blame is assigned collectively, often leading to collective punishment or blame for the misdeeds of individual group members. In highly entitative groups, members are perceived as similar and interchangeable, making it easier to view the actions of a few as reflective of the group as a whole. High entitativity therefore increases support for punishing an entire group rather than just individual wrongdoers, even when collective punishment is generally seen as unjust. A case study following the Columbine High School shootings illustrates how entitativity can lead to collective blame in real-world contexts. Researchers found that the perception of entitativity predicted the extent to which various groups, such as the shooters' associated peer group, the Trenchcoat Mafia, and their parents, were collectively blamed for the tragedy. Those groups perceived as more entitative were more likely to be held collectively responsible, even if these groups were not directly involved in the incident.

==== In-group and out-group bias ====
Perceived entitativity can amplify biases toward both in-groups and out-groups, shaping how individuals view and react to different social groups. Within in-groups, entitativity can enhance feelings of unity and identification, leading to increased in-group favoritism. This bias is not necessarily rooted in comparison with out-groups, but can arise from the very perception of the in-group as a unified entity. When people perceive their in-group as highly entitative, a heightened perception of unity strengthens identification with the group and boosts positivity and solidarity within it. People are more likely to extend positive sentiments and favoritism toward fellow group members, reinforcing a sense of collective security and efficacy when they perceive their in-group as more entitative.

Out-group bias, in contrast, is influenced by how entitativity shapes judgments of responsibility. Research shows that individuals' pre-existing attitudes toward a religious out-group shape their perceptions of that group's entitativity, which in turn impacts judgments of collective responsibility. When individuals hold negative attitudes toward an out-group, they tend to view the group as more entitative following a negative action by a single group member, leading them to hold the entire group collectively responsible for the behavior. Conversely, when people view an out-group more favorably, they may perceive the group as lower in entitativity after a member's negative action, limiting the spread of blame.

=== Individual well-being ===
Entitativity in social groups can have a substantial impact on its members' individual well-being, particularly by fulfilling core psychological needs. The more entitative a group is, the more likely that it is able to satisfy members' affiliative, achievement, and identity needs. Intimate groups, like close friendships, are better at fulfilling affiliative needs, while task-oriented groups fulfill achievement needs, and social category groups satisfy identity needs. This enhances personal well-being by allowing individuals to feel that their group membership meets key psychological motivations, which are linked to a sense of connectedness, accomplishment, and belonging.

Additionally, entitativity provides a buffer against self-uncertainty and existential anxiety. Research indicates that individuals facing self-doubt or uncertainty are more likely to seek identification with high-entitativity groups, as these groups offer a clearer set of norms, values, and behaviors that can guide self-definition. Similarly, high-entitativity groups can alleviate existential fears, such as those brought on by thoughts of mortality. Strong identification with an entitative group allows individuals to feel part of something lasting, offering psychological security against the anxiety of physical impermanence. In this way, entitative groups not only fulfill core needs but also support individual well-being by promoting a stable and cohesive identity, ultimately providing psychological resilience in the face of uncertainty and existential concerns.

=== Behavioral and managerial impacts ===
Perceived entitativity can shape a variety of applied and managerial outcomes. This perception often influences both consumer and public judgments about groups, affecting behavioral responses and organizational perceptions in ways that can be beneficial or costly.

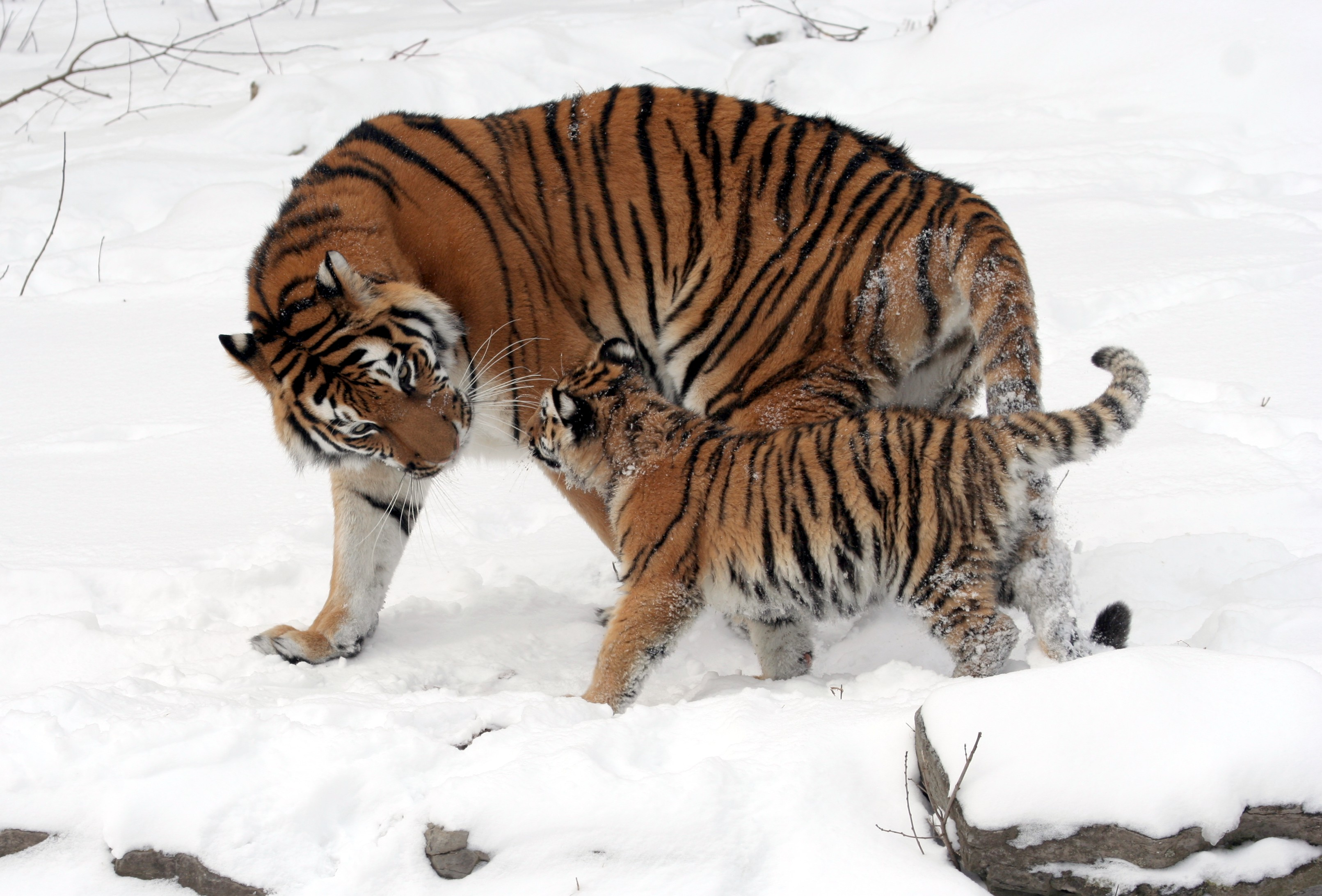
People are more likely to donate to support endangered animals when they are depicted with greater entitativity.

Entitativity has been found to play a significant role in donor behavior. Research shows that people tend to donate more when recipients are perceived as a cohesive group rather than as disconnected individuals. For example, donations are higher when children in need are presented as part of a family or when endangered animals are depicted as moving together, enhancing feelings of concern and empathy. However, this intensified response can also work negatively; victims perceived as sharing negative traits may receive harsher judgments if perceived as entitative, which can reduce willingness to help.

In a sales context, perceived entitativity among customer-facing team members can influence customer satisfaction. When sales teams present a unified image, through for example, matching attire or synchronized behaviors, customers often perceive higher service quality, particularly in structured product categories. However, for creative products, high sales team entitativity can reduce customer satisfaction by implying a lack of individual flair, which customers seek for creative products.

Perceived entitativity can also impact an organization's reputation in multiple ways. Entitative organizations can be more attractive to the public, who often associate unity with competence. However, they also face greater scrutiny and collective blame in the event of an employee committing a wrongdoing, as the public is more likely to attribute individual transgressions to the organization as a whole, potentially undermining trust.

== Measurement ==
Entitativity is a perception-based construct that reflects the extent to which people view a collection of individuals as a cohesive, unified entity rather than as a mere aggregate. Measures of entitativity thus often ask respondents to assess how "group-like" a target group appears, capturing a sense of cohesion and unity.

The seminal approach by Lickel et al. (2000) used a single general item asking perceivers whether a target group "qualified as a group", laying the groundwork for measuring by focusing on the overall group perception rather than specific attributes. Researchers have since also used similar single-item measures of entitativity.

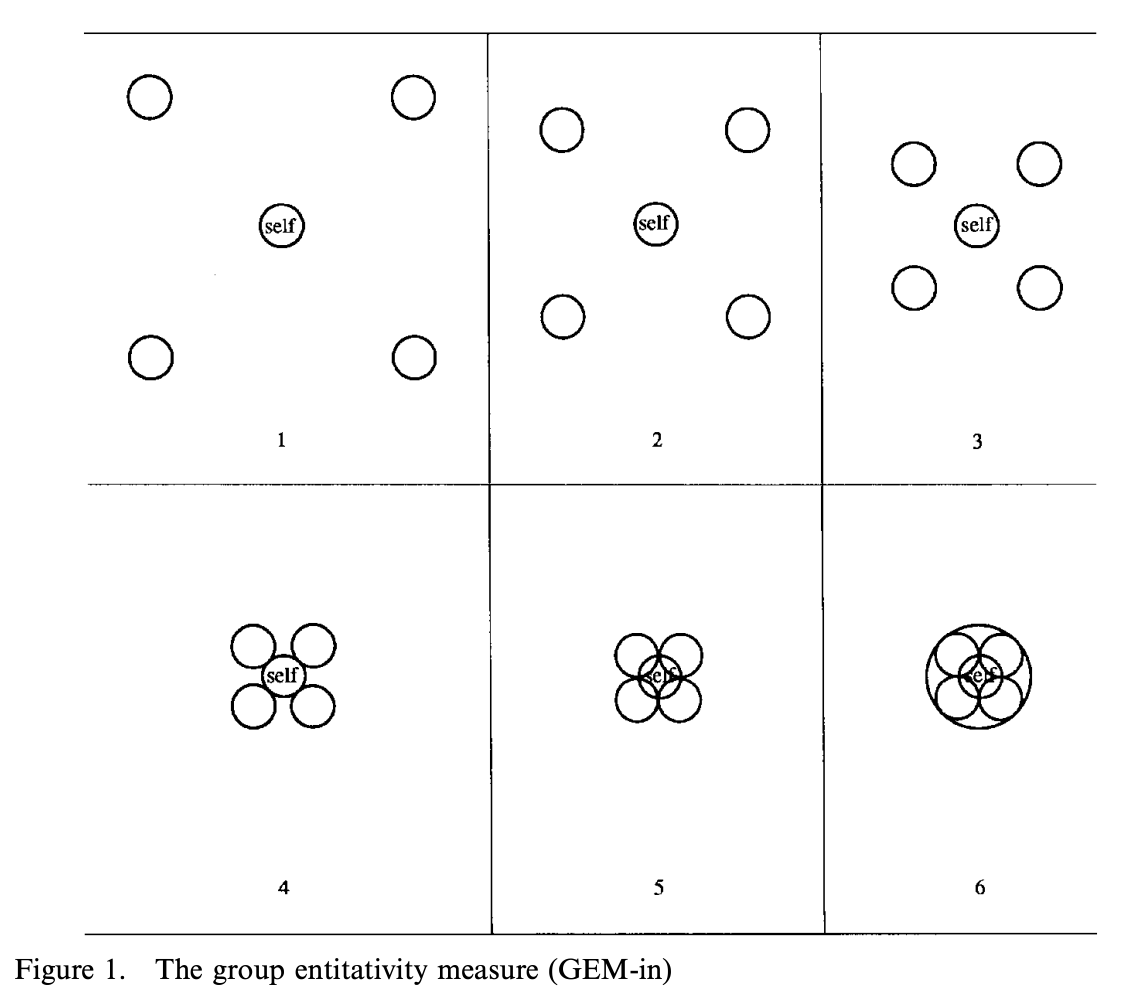
The pictorial measure of entitativity from Gaertner & Schopler (1998)

Some others have taken a different approach, using pictorial representations of overlapping circles to measure perceived entitativity. This measure, however, has not been widely adopted in entitativity research as the measure is potentially confounded with centrality or identification with the group.

Further research has sought to develop multi-item scales and also distinguish measures of entitativity from measures of essentiality. For instance, Denson et al. (2006) developed a scale to measure entitativity alongside essentiality, and constructed six items to capture entitativity:

- Interaction, the extent to which people in the group interact with each other
- Behavioral influence, the degree to which individuals in the group can influence each other
- Norms, the degree to which the group has formal and informal rules
- Interpersonal bonds, the extent to which there are strong interpersonal bonds within the group
- Shared knowledge, the degree to which members share information
- Common goals, the extent to which people in the group have common goals

Similarly, Haslam et al. (2000) used a factor analytic approach to identify four items to capture entitativity:

- Uniformity, the perception that group members are very similar to each other
- Informativeness, that knowing someone belongs to the group allows many judgments about them
- Inherence, the perception that the group has an underlying reality or sameness
- Exclusivity, the sense that belonging excludes one from other categories."

While the items from these two studies are used to assess entitativity, the items tend to measure antecedents to the perception of entitativity rather than the construct itself.

More recent research from Blanchard et al. (2020) introduced a measure of entitativity that distinguishes entitativity from its antecedents. Their scale includes three items that directly capture perceived entitativity:

- "The (target group) are a unit."
- "The (target group) feel like a group to me."
- "The (target group) are a group."

These items are specific to the perception of entitativity as a sense of unity, while related antecedents such as similarity, interactivity, common goals, boundaries, and history of interactions are measured separately. This distinction clarifies that while factors like similarity and shared goals contribute to perceptions of entitativity, they do not constitute entitativity itself.

== Non-human entitativity ==
While entitativity has traditionally been applied to human social groups, recent research has extended the concept to various non-human contexts, such as robots, products, and even geographical areas. These studies explore how the perception of entitativity within these non-human categories can influence human attitudes, behaviors, and decision-making processes.

Research has demonstrated that perceptions of entitativity in robots can affect human attitudes towards and interactions with these robots, depending on the context. For example, in a threatening scenario, a group of entitative robots can be perceived as more threatening than a single robot, and more threatening a group of robots that are less entitative. In a cohesive context however, perceptions of robot group cohesiveness or entitativity can increase humans' positive perceptions and willingness to interact with robots, which can enhance human-robot engagement.

The concept of entitativity has also been applied to consumer products, revealing how the presentation of items in groups can influence consumer perceptions and behaviors. For example, presenting multiple identical product units together enhances the perception of product entitativity. Furthermore, consumers are more likely to believe in the functionality of a product when it is part of an entitative group, as they perceived the products as more homogeneous and united in purpose. Similarly, brand names can influence perceptions of brand entitativity. Research finds that brands with plural names (e.g., Dunkin' Donuts) are viewed more favorably by consumers than those with singular names (e.g., Dunkin' Donut), driven by the perception of the brand as a cohesive entity. This effect, however, was less pronounced for premium brands, suggesting that consumers' expectations of unity may vary depending on the brand's market positioning. For digital services and online products, entitativity can shape trust and adoption behaviors. For instance, perceived entitativity between web payment and mobile payment services influences how trust transfers from one platform to the other. When users perceive a strong relationship between web and mobile payment services, they are more likely to transfer their cognitive and emotional trust from web payments to mobile payments, fostering greater confidence in using the mobile platform.

The idea of entitativity extends to geographical spaces as well, where the perceived entitativity of neighborhoods can influence impressions of the people living there. Neighborhoods with cohesive physical and social characteristics are perceived as more entitative, leading people to make more extreme and confident judgments of their residents, such as judgments of how intelligent the residents are. Therefore, the physical and social attributes of a place can shape perceived entitativity of a neighborhood and how people view individuals associated with that place, influencing social categorization and stereotype formation.

== Criticism and limitations ==
Entitativity, as a construct, has faced criticism for its lack of precise definition, leading to ambiguity in its conceptual clarity and measurement. Campbell's original definition of entitativity as simply "the degree of being entitative. The degree of having the nature of an entity, of having real existence" was foundational, but focused on identifying antecedents rather than providing construct clarity.

There has also been a lack of clarity about whether any of the antecedents to entitativity are necessary or sufficient conditions. For instance, can a group be considered entitative based solely on high levels of similarity, even in the absence of interaction or shared goals? Or does interaction alone suffice to create a sense of groupness? Such questions highlight that it remains unclear which—if any—antecedents are essential or definitive. Consequently, measures of entitativity may capture related attributes or precursors rather than the construct itself, leading to potential confusion between entitativity and its antecedents. This lack of clarity complicates the construct's application across studies and contexts, leaving its core definition vulnerable to sometimes inconsistent interpretations.

== See also ==
- Agency, the capacity of individuals or groups to act independently and make their own free choices
- Attribution, the process by which individuals explain the causes of behavior and events
- Deindividuation, a psychological state in which individuals lose their self-awareness in a group
- Essentialism, the belief that certain categories have an underlying essence that defines their identity
- Gestalt Psychology, a theory emphasizing that humans perceive objects and groups as whole forms rather than as the sum of their parts
- Group cohesiveness, the level of perceived unity within a social group
- Group consciousness (political science), sociopolitical phenomenon where individuals become aware of how their shared group identification impacts them and then pursue shared interests
- Holon (philosophy), a concept describing entities that are both a whole in themselves and part of a larger system
- Homogeneity, the quality of being uniform or similar in nature
- In-group Favoritism, the tendency to prefer and prioritize the needs of one's own group over others
- Intergroup Relations, the interactions, attitudes, and behaviors that occur between different social groups
- Linked fate, sociopolitical phenomenon where individuals who perceive their fates to be intertwined with others in a group pursue the group's interests
- Netscape Communications Corp. v. Konrad, a 2002 American court decision that described when two organizations should be regarded as the same legal entity
- Problem of universals, a debate about the reality of categories
- Reification (fallacy), a fallacy of ambiguity when an abstraction is treated as if it were a physical entity
- Social Categorization, the process of classifying people into groups based on shared characteristics
- Solidarity, awareness of shared interests, objectives, and sympathies creating a psychological sense of unity of groups or classes
- Stereotype, a generalized belief or assumption about a group of people
