= Legitimating ideology =

A legitimating ideology, a term used by sociologists C. Wright Mills and others, refers generally to any ideology which is used to legitimate the actions or policies of states.

The legitimating ideology employed may or may not have an apparent connection to the substance or form of the actions or policies being legitimated by the ideology. It is primarily a term used when making a critical analysis of religious institutions, and corporate and state actions and policies.

== See also ==
- Identity politics
- Self-sufficiency
- Social integration
