= All Lives Matter =

Counterslogan to Black Lives Matter

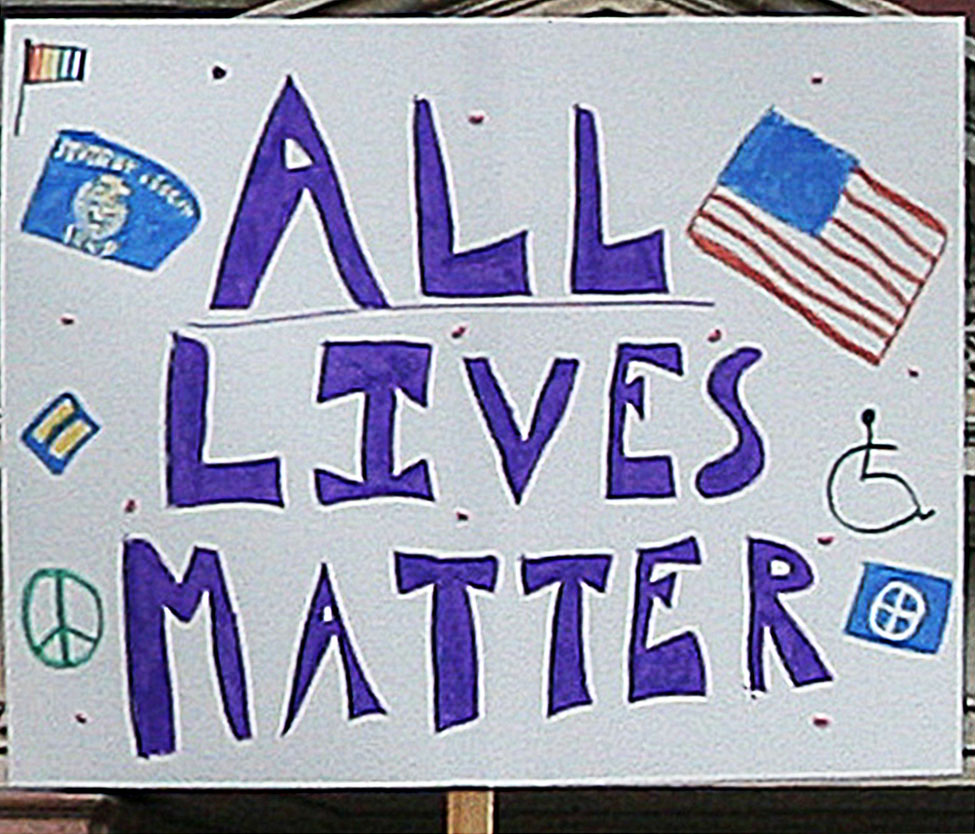
"All Lives Matter" sign at a rally in Portland, Oregon, on June 4, 2017

All Lives Matter is a slogan that emerged as a negative response to the Black Lives Matter (BLM) movement, initially popularized on social media following the police killings of Michael Brown and Eric Garner in 2014. The phrase has been widely criticized as denying that police violence and discrimination disproportionately affect Black Americans, or that it misinterprets "Black Lives Matter" as not a recognition of that disproportionate treatment but as meaning other lives mean less. The slogan received increased attention when used by several high-profile Republican politicians during the 2016 US presidential election, as well as some Democrats who were criticized for it.

== History ==
The All Lives Matter movement was created as a negative response to the Black Lives Matter movement. The use of the All Lives Matter slogan on Twitter following the killings of Michael Brown and Eric Garner began in 2014 and was used to deny recognition of racial violence against African Americans, and spread as a conservative rejection of the Black Live Matter movement's acknowledgement of police brutality and ethnic violence. Some supporters of the Black Lives Matter movement adopted the All Lives Matter slogan to shift debate away from semantics, while others avoided the term entirely.

The All Lives Matter slogan gained prominence in national American politics during the 2016 United States presidential election. In June 2015, Democratic presidential candidate Hillary Clinton faced backlash after using the phrase "all lives matter" at an African-American church in Missouri during her presidential campaign. Martin O'Malley, another 2016 Democratic presidential candidate, was booed when he said: "White lives matter. All lives matter." Several Republican candidates supported the All Lives Matter movement in the 2016 presidential election. Donald Trump said "All lives matter" at one of his rallies, and claimed that "Black Lives Matter" is a divisive and racist term. United States Republican Senator Tim Scott has used the term when calling for racial equality and unity. Ben Carson, former Secretary of Housing and Urban Development under Donald Trump, is a proponent of All Lives Matter, as is Senator Rand Paul, who has claimed that Black Lives Matter "focused on the wrong targets". Paul stated that "I think they should change their name maybe—if they were All Lives Matter, or Innocent Lives Matter." Other Republican supporters include Mike Pence and Rudy Giuliani.

On February 24, 2016, Mark Zuckerberg, CEO of Facebook, sent out a company-wide internal memo to employees formally rebuking employees who had crossed out handwritten "Black Lives Matter" phrases on the company walls and had written "All Lives Matter" in their place. The memo was then leaked by several employees. As Zuckerberg had previously condemned this practice at previous company meetings, and other similar requests had been issued by other leaders at Facebook, Zuckerberg wrote in the memo that he would now consider this overwriting practice not only disrespectful, but "malicious as well". According to Zuckerberg's memo, "Black Lives Matter doesn't mean other lives don't – it's simply asking that the black community also achieves the justice they deserve." The memo also said that the act of crossing something out in itself, "means silencing speech, or that one person's speech is more important than another's."

In July 2016, American football player Richard Sherman supported the All Lives Matter message, saying "I stand by what I said that All Lives Matter and that we are human beings." He wanted African Americans to be "treated like human beings" and did not want innocent police officers being killed. On October 2, 2016, a fan at a Chicago Bears NFL game ran onto the field during a television timeout during the 4th quarter dressed in a gorilla costume, wearing a shirt that read "All Lives Matter" on the front.

At a performance during the 2016 MLB All-Star Game in July 2016, Remigio Pereira, a member of The Tenors, held up an "All Lives Matter" sign and altered some lyrics to the anthem "O Canada". Pereira sang, "We're all brothers and sisters. All lives matter to the great," instead of the lines, "With glowing hearts we see thee rise, The True North strong and free." Even after criticism (and later removal from the group), he defended his statement, tweeting "I speak for the human race and the lives of all sentient beings. Love, peace, and harmony for ALL has always been my life's purpose."

Activists from Black Lives Matter and All Lives Matter made headlines in July 2016 when they embraced during a run-in in Dallas, stating: "We're all brothers and sisters."

American rapper XXXTentacion came under criticism in September 2017 when he supported the movement in the music video for his hit song "Look at Me!". The video depicted him – a black male – hanging a white child. After criticism, he said the goal of it was to show that "[Y]ou can't justify the fact that I murdered a child. ... I'm trying to show that murder is murder," in similar fashion to his song "Riot", which criticized many rioters associated with the Black Lives Matter movement.

On June 11, 2020, Australian senator and One Nation leader Pauline Hanson put forward a bid to pass an "all lives matter" motion, but lost the vote by 51 to 2. In July 2020, Cisco Systems fired "a handful" of employees for comments made during a mandatory company meeting which featured Darren Walker and Bryan Stevenson speaking about diversity. Some of the comments defended the phrase "All Lives Matter". On September 11, 2020, the phrase "All Buildings Matter" became a trending topic on Twitter. The phrase was popularized by comedian Michael Che as a parody of "All Lives Matter", in reference to the September 11th attacks.

== Motivation and beliefs ==
The motivations of the All Lives Matter movement are disputed and may vary between individuals. According to a study published in the British Journal of Social Psychology, measures of racial prejudice and racist sentiments against Black people are correlated with support for All Lives Matter. This racism may be explicitly acknowledged, or it may be implicit racism that is not apparent to those expressing it. Some advocates of All Lives Matter instead support racial color blindness as a means to equality, favoring terms they argue are more inclusive like All Lives Matter over those that emphasize a particular demographic. Support for the All Lives Matter movement is also correlated with stricter definitions of discrimination; individuals that believe discrimination must be intentional are more likely to support All Lives Matter. Support for Black Lives Matter and All Lives Matter have not been shown to be mutually exclusive, and some individuals may support or oppose both movements.

== Criticisms ==
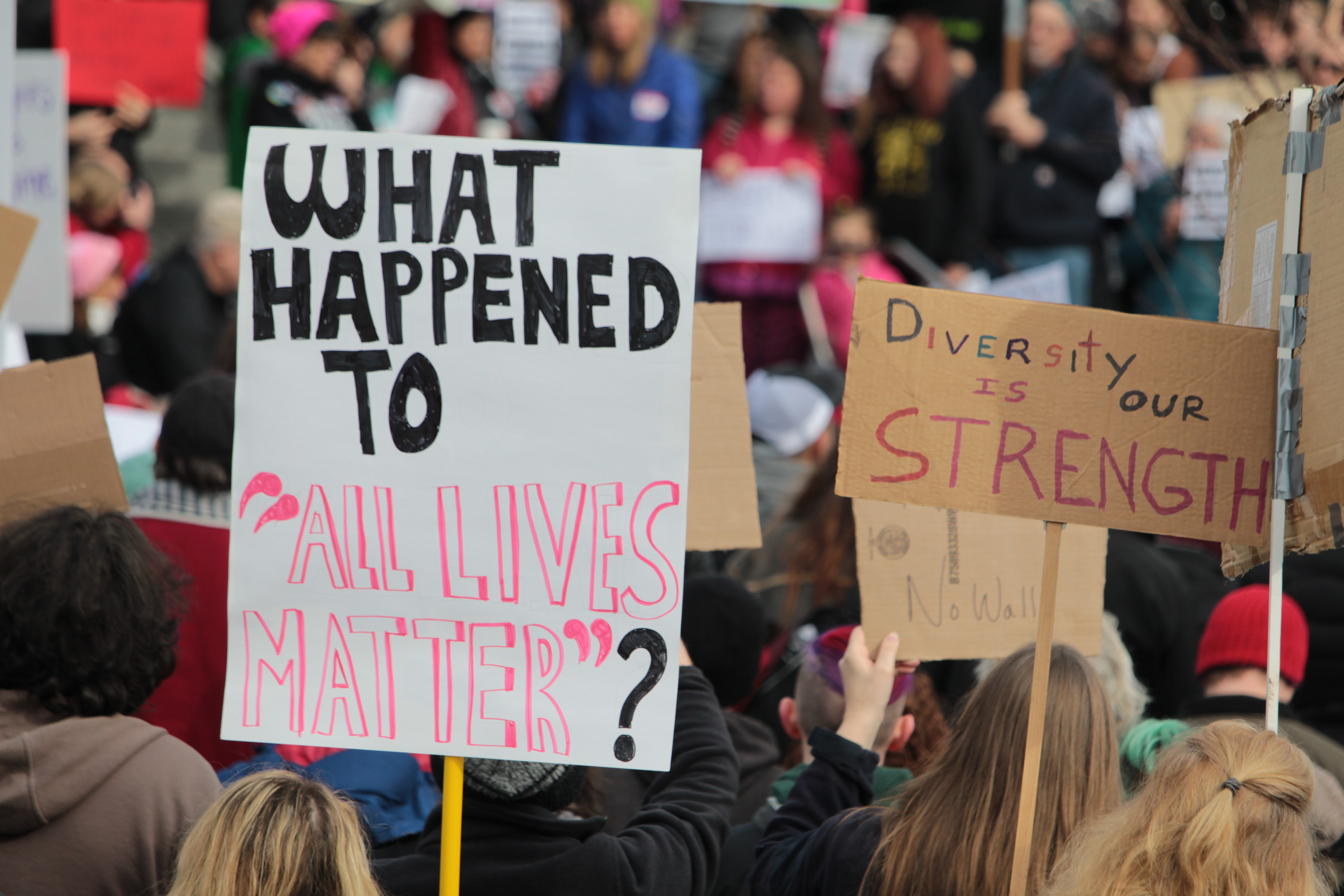
"What happened to 'All Lives Matter'?", a sign at a protest against Donald Trump

External image
- "All Houses Matter", Chainsawsuit, Kris Straub, July 7, 2016. Cartoonist uses a house fire to illustrate why critics see "All Lives Matter" as problematic.

According to professor of critical race theory, David Theo Goldberg, "All Lives Matter" reflects a view of "racial dismissal, ignoring, and denial". Philosopher Chris Lebron describes "All Lives Matter" as a "disingenuous retort" that misunderstands the problem raised by Black Lives Matter proponents. On Real Time with Bill Maher, Bill Maher expressed support for use of the "Black Lives Matter" phrase, stating that "'All Lives Matter' implies that all lives are equally at risk, and they're not".

Founders of the Black Lives Matter movement have responded to criticism of the movement's exclusivity, saying, "#BlackLivesMatter doesn't mean your life isn't important – it means that Black lives, which are seen without value within white supremacy, are important to your liberation." Black Lives Matter movement co-founder Alicia Garza argues that "all lives matter" rhetoric has negative effects for racial justice: "When we deploy 'All Lives Matter' as to correct an intervention specifically created to address anti-blackness, we lose the ways in which the state apparatus has built a program of genocide and repression mostly on the backs of Black people—beginning with the theft of millions of people for free labor—and then adapted it to control, murder, and profit off of other communities of color and immigrant communities. . . When you drop 'Black' from the equation of whose lives matter, and then fail to acknowledge it came from somewhere, you further a legacy of erasing Black lives and Black contributions from our movement legacy." In a video interview with Laura Flanders, Garza said that "changing Black Lives Matter to All Lives Matter is a demonstration of how we don't actually understand structural racism in this country".

President Barack Obama spoke to the debate between Black Lives Matter and All Lives Matter. Obama said, "I think that the reason that the organizers used the phrase Black Lives Matter was not because they were suggesting that no one else's lives matter ... rather what they were suggesting was there is a specific problem that is happening in the African-American community that's not happening in other communities." He also said "that is a legitimate issue that we've got to address."

In July 2016, USA Today concluded from the thoughts of Columbia University sociology professor Carla Shedd, that the phrase All Lives Matter could "be interpreted as racist". It also cited professor Joe Feagin, who said that white people use the phrase "All Lives Matter" to ignore the Black Lives Matter movement, which he described as "already about liberty and justice for all." USA Today reported that some celebrities who had tweeted using the hashtag #AllLivesMatter, including Jennifer Lopez and Fetty Wap, had deleted the tweets and apologized. Wap stated that he did not fully understand the hashtag. It also mentioned cartoonist Kris Straub, who tweeted a cartoon titled "All Houses Matter", showing a house fire, to illustrate what he saw as the problem with the term.

Andrew D. Chapman, a philosopher at the University of Colorado Boulder, has provided a criticism of "All Lives Matter" from the perspective of philosophy of language. According to Chapman, while both "Black Lives Matter" and "All Lives Matter" are true (and, in fact, the latter entails the former), the focus by proponents of the slogan "All Lives Matter" on mere truth or falsity of the slogan is either deceptively narrow or disingenuous. Linguistic meaning has a substantial pragmatic component, and the context of usage of a word or phrase cannot be ignored. Chapman concludes that, "all lives matter is being said as a challenge to the claim that black lives matter, as a way of pushing back against and drowning out the voices of those saying that black lives matter, as a way of...forcing listeners to choose whether it is all lives that matter or merely black lives (which, of course, is not what 'Black Lives Matter' means)."

== See also ==
- Blue Lives Matter
- Reverse racism
