= Ethnic competition thesis =

The ethnic competition thesis, also known as ethnic competition theory or ethnic competition hypothesis, is an academic theory that posits that individuals support far-right political parties because they wish to reduce competition from immigrants over scarce resources such as jobs, housing, mating opportunities and welfare benefits. According to the theory, support for the far right should be higher in areas if there are more immigrants and more lower-educated and lower-skilled voters who would face competition from them (because of the relative ease of onboarding in low-skilled jobs, even for a non-integrated foreigner).

Several studies have found support for ethnic competition thesis. A 2011 study by Jens Rydgren and Patrick Ruth found some support for the theory in that support for the far-right Sweden Democrats party was higher in areas where there were a higher number of immigrants. Another study by Abbondanza and Bailo, published in 2018, found similar support for this thesis with the Lega Nord in Northern Italy as a case study. However, other studies have questioned the link between the number of refugees, number of asylum seekers, or proportion of noncitizens and people born abroad and the success of the far right.

== See also ==
- Modernisation losers thesis
- Opposition to immigration
- Linked fate
