= Group consciousness (political science) =

Phenomenon of group members advocating shared interests

Group consciousness in political science refers to the phenomenon in which members within a social identity group become aware of how their group identification impacts their position in society, and therefore come together to pursue collective action to advocate for their shared interests. Group consciousness requires two necessary preconditions: group membership, and group identification. Group membership is the 'objective' belonging within the group, while identification refers to the subjective psychological importance of the group to the member. Group consciousness has been studied, for example, among women, Hispanic and Latino Americans, and Muslim Americans.

== The intent behind group consciousness ==
Group consciousness is not automatically assumed to exist with any organization of people. However, group consciousness often stems from the existence of group agents. These organizations bring people together through common purposes and intentions that they act upon. Some examples of group agents include courts, corporations, NGOs, and other collectives of individuals. Group consciousness requires unity through the group's belief in a set of "ideological beliefs about one's group's social standing." Groups also take on the view that to improve their social standing and best reach their goals, the best policy is to pursue collective action.

Beyond formal organizations like corporations and nonprofits, group consciousness is often linked to socially stratified groups, including class, gender, race, etc. When discussing racial consciousness specifically, group consciousness emerges from the notion that people's identities are inseparable from their race. As a result, minority groups, particularly oppressed minority groups, band together to find a source of communal support. In America specifically, African-Americans specifically have been historically treated as part of a racial group, instead of recognized for their individual identities. Researchers have therefore connected this idea of "linked fate," meaning the viewpoint that one's fate is "inextricably linked to the fate of their racial group" to a heightened sense of group consciousness.

== Current debate regarding group consciousness qualifications ==
One key point of contention within the philosophy is whether or not the “consciousness” of a group can be phenomenal, meaning experiential, or if it is purely a sense of awareness. The argument has been made that entire states can be “phenomenally conscious,” meaning they can subjectively experience perceptions and sensations as one entity. In his paper “If Materialism is True, the United States is Probably Conscious,” philosopher Eric Schwitzgebel argues that the United States experiences a consciousness that overrides individual citizens. Schwitzgebel posits that through using materialist philosophy, it may be argued that the United States has the characteristics also present in what materialists consider to be “conscious beings.” In this case, we can take materialism to mean the belief that solely matter, rather than the mind or ideas, can be treated as real objects. In the context of group consciousness, this refers to the controversial debate over whether a group can function as its own being, or if group consciousness is primarily a metaphor. Schwitzgebel believes in the former. He states that the US is self-preserving, goal-oriented, and can respond intelligently to threats and opportunities. The US functions as an individual entity. Thus, the United States can be said to have a concrete identity through Schwitzgebel's interpretation of group consciousness.

However, philosophers like Christian List also posit that group agents are not necessarily phenomenally conscious. Within his paper, "What Is It Like to Be a Group Agent?" he argues that there is an important distinction that must be made between consciousness as awareness and as experience. List posits that group agents are able to have consciousness as awareness. A group agent may share beliefs and act on then, but it is the individuals in this group, who are aware of their shared identity, who are performing the action. Group consciousness thus doesn't mean that a group can act as a true collective singular; it only facilitates collective action.

== Group consciousness within feminism ==
Feminist consciousness is defined as "politicized gender identification," which is when women link their gender identity and the societal issues that arise alongside it with a set of political beliefs. Based on research regarding women's rights activism, personality and life experiences can be seen as factors that lead to feminist consciousness. For instance, women who are more politically engaged tend to embrace feminism and feminist activism than women who are not. In addition, women with intersectional identities, meaning women who identify with more than one marginalized female identity, are also more likely to be very aware of their group membership and thus develop group consciousness. For example, lesbians experience discrimination on the basis of sexual orientation and gender; they are therefore more likely to be aware of their oppression and seek solace in group solidarity. Viewing feminism as a case study for group consciousness demonstrates how even within collective action entities, there are outside factors that influence the extent to which members are willing to participate.

== See also ==
- Entitativity
- Group cohesiveness, the level of perceived unity within a social group
- Linked fate, sociopolitical phenomenon where individuals who perceive their fates to be intertwined with others in a group pursue the group's interests
- Solidarity, awareness of shared interests, objectives, and sympathies creating a psychological sense of unity of groups or classes
