= Linked fate =

Sociopolitical phenomenon

Linked fate is a concept in political science coined by Michael Dawson in 1994, defined as the degree to which an individual believes that what happens to their own racial group will affect their own well-being and life chances. Linked fate describes the mechanism by which group consciousness leads to political cohesion among members of a social identity group. Based on the black utility heuristic and originating in African-American studies, Dawson describes how individuals who perceived their fates as individuals to be highly linked to those of other in-group members were posited to be more conscious of the group's interests as whole when making political decisions (such as voting). Grounded in the social identity theory and self-categorization theory, linked fate relies on the assumption that African Americans' shared experiences and subjugations result in the formation of their concept of self by contrasting their status in the racial hierarchy to Whites and recognizing that being Black shapes their experiences across multiple social boundaries. Furthermore, predictors of linked fate vary outside of the black-white paradigm where notions of linked fate have been observed among Asian Americans, Hispanic Americans and Muslim Americans.

== Background ==
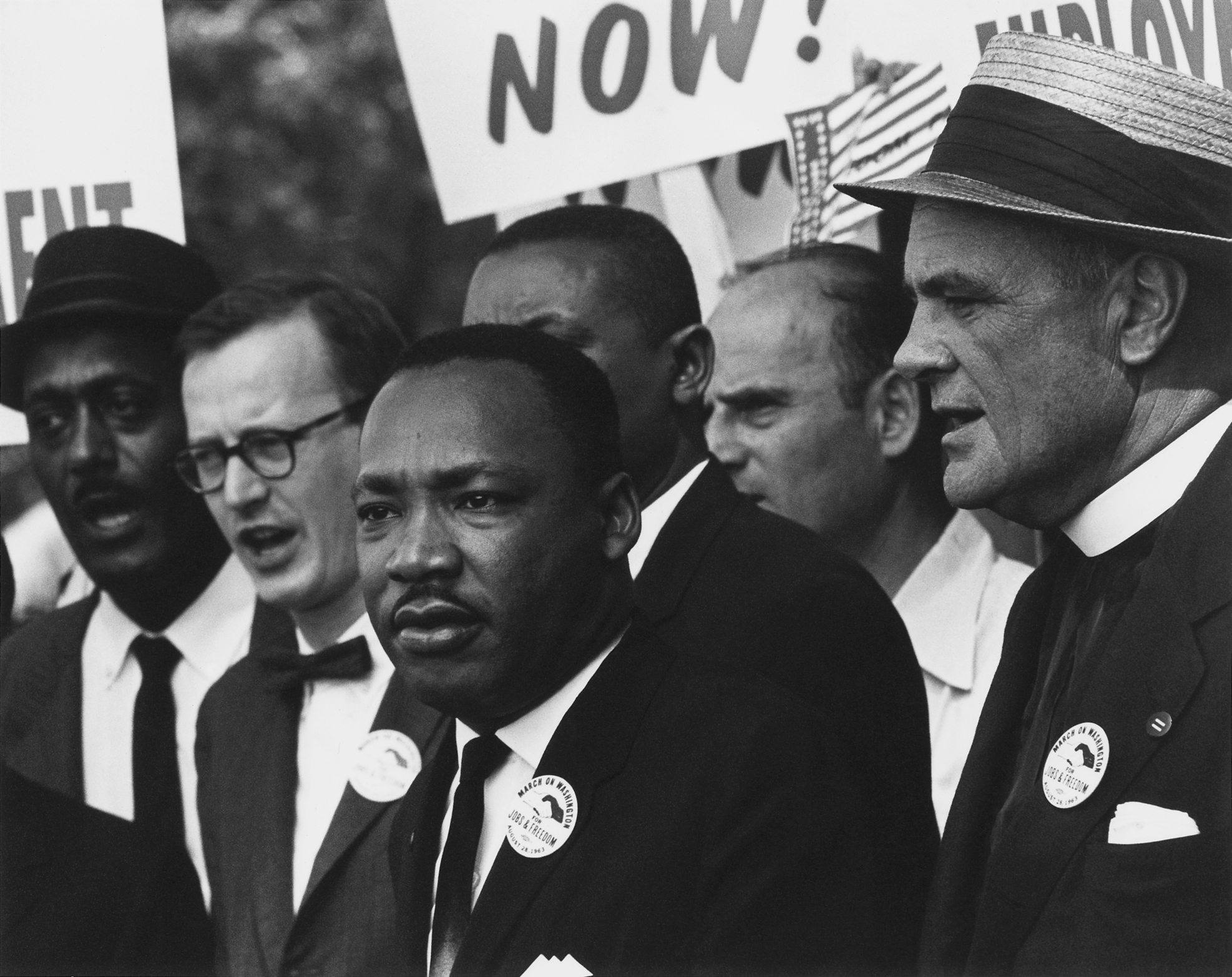
Civil Rights March

After the Civil Rights Movement in the 1960s, the political, social, and economic structures in America underwent significant changes, where African Americans had new opportunities for social and economic mobility. With the shifting race relations during this period, scholars argued that Blacks' life chances no longer relied on their relation with Whites but rather on their economic positioning. It was believed that before the civil rights era, Blacks were oppressed through the continuous and systemic efforts made by Whites to maintain racial segregation. However, in the late 20th century, these traditional barriers weakened with the social and economic changes, and therefore, Blacks now faced new barriers of class subordination.

Original class-based theories held that racial and ethnic groups should have differing political attitudes, the more economically polarized the group is. With the rise of the Black middle class, there was an expectation that those of the Black middle class would adopt more conservative views while those of the lower class would adopt more liberal views. However, despite differences in class structures, African Americans were still relatively unified. Seeing that the individual interests of middle-class Blacks aligned with Black group interests, Dawson argues that group interests serve as a proxy for individual interests and develops the concept of linked fate. Linked fate rests on the idea that the historical experiences of subjugation shared among Blacks have made race more salient than class and, in turn, affect their political attitudes. Therefore, race remains the decisive factor in political behavior even with the changes in class structures.

== Black linked fate ==
With African Americans being historically marginalized, they have often had to depend on their community to advocate for their needs and obtain political representation. According to Dawson's theory, regardless of within-group diversity, Blacks will exhibit strong linked fate that leads to significant political cohesion. This has been used to explain African Americans' strong attachment to the Democratic Party. Linked fate has also been used to explain the mobilization of African American voters and the overwhelming support for Black Democrats.

However, the application of linked fate had led to concerns over the generalization of Black American interests, giving rise to studies focusing on the intersection of race, gender, sexuality, and how these identities affect both mobilizing power and group-based issue importance. For Black women in particular, their racial identity more powerfully predicts political attitudes in comparison to their gender identity, except, most notably, in cases where the racial interests of Black people directly conflict with gender interests of women. Seeing how Black men identify more strongly and differently with their race compared to Black women because of their different lived experiences demonstrates the importance of recognizing these intragroup differences, particularly in their political participation.

== Linked fate among other ethnic groups ==
Rapid growth among Latinos across the U.S.

Following success in explaining African American political choices through linked fate, scholars in Asian American and Latino politics showed that pan-ethnic linked fate is associated with unified policy stances and greater political participation. With the exponential growth of other racial minority groups like Asian Americans and Latinos in the U.S., the way in which their linked fate shapes their political behavior has been proven to be relevant in political science research. Their rapid growth has had important political implications as they are increasingly reshaping politics. However, the shared historical experiences that helped African Americans build a sense of linked fate may not function in the same way for other racial groups like Asian Americans, Arab Americans, and Latinos.

Among Asian Americans, perceptions of linked fate vary widely across national-origin groups, yet they still have a sense of linked fate with other Asian Americans. Compared to Asian Americans, Latinos are more likely to express a sense of linked fate, but less likely than African Americans. Shared experiences like immigration and acculturation among these groups do not necessarily lead to a shared perception of shared fate. This is because each community is heterogeneous, and individuals within each community perceive their group differently. Socioeconomic status, for instance, does encourage panethnic identity for each group. However, for Latinos, education was a primary factor, while income was the main factor for Asian Americans in their sense of shared fate. Furthermore, different measures of racial discrimination predict pan-ethnic consciousness for each group, however, the cues that trigger specific heuristic processes are seen to vary among these groups.

== See also ==
- Entitativity, the perception of a social unit as a group
- Ethnic competition thesis
- Group cohesiveness, the level of perceived unity within a social group
- Group consciousness (political science), sociopolitical phenomenon where individuals become aware of how their shared group identification impacts them and then pursue shared interests
- Relative deprivation thesis
- Solidarity, awareness of shared interests, objectives, and sympathies creating a psychological sense of unity of groups or classes
